= Georgian monarchs family tree of Bagrationi dynasty of Imereti =

Georgian monarchs family tree of Bagrationi dynasty of Imereti

BAGRATIONI of united Georgia
Constantine I King of Georgia r.1405/1407–1412
Alexander I 1386–1445/1446; King of Georgia r. 1412–1442	George; Co-king of Georgia r.1408–1412
Demetrius c. 1413–1453; Co-King of Georgia r.1433–1446	George VIII; 1417–1476; King of Georgia r. 1446–1465; King of Kakheti r. 1465–1476	Bagrat VI c. 1439–1478; King of Imereti r.1463–1478 King of Georgia r.1465–1478
BAGRATIONI of Kartli	BAGRATIONI of Kakheti
Alexander II; King of Georgia r.1478 King of Imereti r.1483–1510
David fl.1510–1524	Vakhtang fl.1512–1548	Bagrat III; King of Imereti b.1495-d.1565 King of Imereti r.1510–1565	Giorgi fl.1511–1545	Demetre fl.1511
George II d.1585 King of Imereti r.1565–1585	Prince; Constantine d.1587	Teimuraz fl.1514–1583	Vakhtang fl.1520–fl.1565	Tamar d.1556	Luarsab I King of Kartli r.1527-1556 or 1534-1558
Levan b.1573–d.1590 King of Imereti r.1585–1590	Rostom b.1561–d.1605 King of Imereti r.1590–1605	George III d.1639 King of Imereti r.1605–1639	Bagrat; Anti-king of Imereti r.1590
Alexander III b.1609–d.1660 King of Imereti r.1639–1660	Rostom fl.1619–1639	Mamuka d.1654	Beri; Svimeon; Archbp. of Gelati fl. 1639	Khvaramze fl.1619–1626
Bagrat IV b.1620–d.1681 King of Imereti; 1660–61 1663–68; 1669–78 1679–81	Klimenti fl.1651	Tinatin fl.1661–1680
Alexander IV d.1695 King of Imereti; 1683-90 1691-95	Giorgi	Darejan d.after1726	Mariam d. c.1726	Tinatin b.1678–d.1760
Simon d.1701 King of Imereti r.1698–1701	George VI d.1720 King of Imereti; 1707–11 1712–13; 1713–16 1719–20
Mamuka fl.1719–1769 King of Imereti r.1746–1749	Rostom fl. 1746	Alexander V b.≈1703–d.1752 King of Imereti; 1720–41 1741–46; 1749–1752	George VII b.1718–d.1778 King of Imereti r.1741
Giorgi fl.1768	Teimuraz d.≈1768 King of Imereti r.1766–1768	Solomon I b.1735–d.1784 King of Imereti; 1752–66 1768–82	Joseph b.1739–d.1776 Catholicos of Abkhazia; 1769–1776	Prince; Bagrat b.1741-d.1800	Prince Archil d.1775	David II b.1756–d.1795 King of Imereti; 1784–89 1790–91
Darejan; 1756–1827	Alexander b.1760–d.1780	Prince David b. 1781	Prince Simon b.1771	Solomon II b.1772–d.1815 King of Imereti r.1789–1810	Constantine b.1789–d.1844
Ivane; Abashidze d.1822	Prince Rostom b.1791
Simon b.1812	Mzekhatun b.1814	Irine b.1816	Ephrosine b.1818	Anastasia b.1820
Olga b.1843	Rostom; Imeretinsky b.1845	Mariam b.1848
Grigol; Imeretinsky b.1885-d.1937
Irakli; Bagrationi b.1925–d.2013
David; Bagrationi b.1948
Irakli; Bagrationi b.1982

== Bibliography ==
- Rayfield, Donald (2013). Edge of Empires: A History of Georgia. Reaktion Books. ISBN 9781780230702.
- Toumanoff, Cyril (1990). The dynasties of Christian Caucasus from Antiquity to the 19th century: Genealogical and chronological tables. Rome.
