= Prince Alexander of Imereti (1760–1780) =

- Born: 1760
- Died: October 1780 (aged 19–20)
- Spouse: Princess Salome of Georgia (m. 1777) Daughter of Evgeni Abashidze (m. 1778; div. 1778) Darejan Tsulukidze (m. 1779)
- Issue: Prince George (ill.)
- Dynasty: Bagrationi
- Father: Solomon I of Imereti
- Mother: Mariam Dadiani
- Religion: Georgian Orthodox Church (Catholicate of Abkhazia)

Alexander (Georgian: ალექსანდრე, romanized: aleksandre; 1760 – October 1780) was a Georgian royal prince (batonishvili) of the Bagrationi dynasty of the Kingdom of Imereti. He was the son and heir of King Solomon I of Imereti. His life was marked by political unrest, including his involvement in a noble conspiracy against his father in 1778. He died in October 1780 at the age of 20.

== Biography ==
Alexander was born in 1760 as the son of Solomon I of Imereti and his second wife, Queen Mariam Dadiani, daughter of Otia Dadiani, Prince of Mingrelia. He was a grandson of King Alexander V of Imereti and the brother of Princesses Darejan and Mariam. He is first mentioned on 8 September of that year in a charter issued by his father and appears continuously in various sources until his death.

According to Johann Anton Güldenstädt, Alexander was "a dark-complexioned, tall, handsome young man" with "a very lively, kind, and affectionate expression." Solomon entrusted his son's upbringing to his "most loyal" nobleman, Prince Giorgi Tsulukidze, who accompanied the prince wherever he went.

Alexander's personal life was marked by turmoil. As a young man, he fell deeply in love with Mariam Zhghenti. Captivated by her beauty, he wished to marry her, and together they had an illegitimate son, George. Solomon I forcibly separated the couple; unable to endure the separation, Mariam died. Alexander's first lawful wife was a daughter of Prince George (the future King George XII), son of King Heraclius II of Georgia. They were married in Tbilisi on 3 January 1777. Alexander did not bring his bride to Imereti; instead, he arrived in Kutaisi on 19 January, already married. While his lawful wife was still alive, either later that year or at the beginning of 1778, he married a daughter of Evgeni Abashidze.

In April 1778, Alexander joined a noble conspiracy against his father. Its principal instigators were sakhltukhutsesi David Abashidze and Tamaz Meskhi; the conspirators also included Alexander's father-in-law, Evgeni Abashidze. The immediate pretext for the conspiracy was Solomon's marriage to Gulkan Tsulukidze shortly after Queen Mariam's death in 1778. Thereafter, Alexander reportedly became hostile toward his father due to his "stepmother's lesser birth."

Following the conspiracy's defeat later that year, Alexander fled Imereti and sought refuge with King Heraclius II, who received him favorably and treated him with honor. Heraclius reconciled Alexander with Solomon and sent him back to Imereti. Having fallen under the influence of the rebellious nobles, Alexander was punished by the king and compelled to divorce the daughter of Evgeni Abashidze, one of the uprising's participants. In 1779, Solomon arranged Alexander's third marriage to Darejan, daughter of his loyal nobleman Beri Tsulukidze. Solomon's third wife, Gulkan, was also Beri Tsulukidze's sister.

For "dismissing his wife and contracting an unlawful marriage," Alexander was excommunicated by the Church. He died shortly afterward in October 1780. Solomon I wished for his son to be buried with appropriate honors inside the church, but the clergy refused because the prince had been excommunicated. Instead, Alexander was buried outside the church at Gelati, with only a single priest leading the funeral procession.

== Family ==
Prince Alexander was married three times. His first marriage, on 3 January 1777, was to Salome, daughter of King George XII. His second marriage, in 1778, was to an unnamed daughter of Prince Evgeni Abashidze, and his third was to Darejan, daughter of Prince Beri Tsulukidze. Alexander had no legitimate children but had an illegitimate son with Mariam Zhghenti:

- Prince George (1778–1807), who became a pretender to the throne. He was later arrested, imprisoned, and eventually escaped to the Russian Empire, becoming the ancestor of the Bagration-Imeretinsky branch of the family.

== Ancestry ==
Ancestors of Prince Alexander of Imereti (1760–1780)

16. Alexander IV of Imereti
8. George VI of Imereti
17. A concubine
4. Alexander V of Imereti
9. Rodam of Kartli
2. Solomon I of Imereti
20. George V of Imereti (Abashidze)
Levan Abashidze
5. Tamar Abashidze
1. Alexander
24. George IV Dadiani
12. Bezhan Dadiani
25. Sevdia Mikeladze
6. Otia Dadiani
13. Tamar Gelovani
3. Mariam Dadiani
28. Papuna II of Racha
14. Shoshita III of Racha
29. Daughter of Bezhan Lordkipanidze
7. Gulkan of Racha
30. Alexander IV of Imereti
15. Mariam of Imereti
31. Mariam (daughter of Giorgi-Malakia Abashidze)

== Bibliography ==
- Soselia, Olgha (1990). ნარკვევები ფეოდალური ხანის დასავლეთ საქართველოს სოციალურ-პოლიტიკური ისტორიიდან. წიგნი III: სათავადოები (in Georgian). Tbilisi: Metsniereba. ISBN 5-520-00728-4.
- Brosset, Marie-Félicité (1857). Histoire moderne de la Géorgie [Modern History of Georgia] (in French). Saint Petersburg: Imperial Academy of Sciences.
