= Mamia IV Gurieli =

Prince of Guria
- Reign: 1726–1756
- Predecessor: George IV Gurieli
- Successor: George V Gurieli
- Reign: 1758–1765
- Predecessor: George V Gurieli
- Successor: George V Gurieli
- Reign: 1771–1776
- Predecessor: George V Gurieli
- Successor: George V Gurieli
- Died: 1784
- Spouse: 1); Princess Rodam of Imereti (m. 1732; died 1770): 2) Princess Tavdgiridze
- Issue: George; Tamar
- House: Gurieli
- Father: George IV Gurieli
- Mother: Mariam Sharvashidze
- Religion: Georgian Orthodox Church (Catholicate of Abkhazia)

Mamia IV Gurieli (Georgian: მამია IV გურიელი; died 1778 or 1784), of the western Georgian House of Gurieli, was Prince of Guria from 1726 to 1756 and again from 1758 to 1765 and from 1771 to 1776. Intermissions of his rule was the result of Mamia's rivalry with his younger brother, Giorgi V Gurieli, and complex political situation in the region, including the Ottoman encroachments and efforts by the kings of Imereti to bring western Georgian polities under their supreme authority.

== Early rule ==
Mamia was the eldest son of George IV Gurieli, Prince of Guria, by his wife, Elene née Shervashidze-Eristavi. He was born before 1717, the year when George divorced Elene in order to marry Khvaramze, daughter of Bezhan Dadiani of Mingrelia. Mamia succeeded on the death of his father in 1726. In 1732, he forged an alliance with King Alexander V of Imereti, marrying the king's daughter Rodam, and rendered support to Alexander against the coalition of western Georgian nobles led by Otia Dadiani, Prince of Mingrelia, Grigol, Duke of Racha, and Zurab Abashidze, who intended to place Alexander's brother Mamuka on the throne of Imereti. Alexander and Mamia won the bloody encounter at Chikhori.

== Deposition and comeback ==
Mamia's relations with Alexander's son and successor, Solomon I, was initially hostile. His involvement in an ultimately unsuccessful coup against Solomon in 1752 cost him the throne of Guria: Solomon returned with Ottoman support in 1756 and deposed Mamia in favor of his younger brother, George V Gurieli. Mamia fled to the mountains of Racha and eventually crossed into eastern Georgia to solicit support from the resurgent king Heraclius II of Georgia. Through Heraclius's intercession, Mamia garnered favor with the Ottoman pasha of Akhaltsikhe and was restored in Guria in 1758. He reconciled with Solomon and took part in his struggle against the Ottoman encroachments and slave-trading. In 1765, the pasha of Akhaltsikhe overthrew Mamia and replaced him with his more amenable brother, George V Gurieli.

During the Russo-Turkish War of 1768–1774, Solomon invaded Guria, defeated an Ottoman force marching from Batumi to Imereti, and restored Mamia in his principality. The relations between the two rulers quickly soured as Solomon sought to assert his supremacy in all of western Georgia. In 1775, he twice raided Guria. Mamia's brother and rival George exploited the instability and forced Mamia into retirement to a monastery. Mamia died in 1784 (or 1778 according to Cyril Toumanoff).

== Family ==
Mamia was married twice, first to Princess Rodam of Imereti, and then to a noblewoman Tavdgiridze. He had three children:

- Darejan (died 1813), married to Prince Mkheidze;
- George;
- Tamar.

Mamia IV Gurieli House of Gurieli
Regnal titles
Preceded by Giorgi IV Gurieli	Prince of Guria; 1726–1756	Succeeded by Giorgi V Gurieli
Preceded by Giorgi V Gurieli	Prince of Guria; 1758–1765	Succeeded by Giorgi V Gurieli
Preceded by Giorgi V Gurieli	Prince of Guria; 1771–1776	Succeeded by Giorgi V Gurieli
