= Kaikhosro IV Gurieli =

Prince of Guria
- Reign: 1797–1809
- Predecessor: Vakhtang III Gurieli
- Successor: Mamia V Gurieli
- Died: 1829
- Spouse: 1) Makidjaspi Nakashidze; 2) Elisabed Eristavi-Sharvashidze
- Issue: Malakia; Despine; Dimitri; Pelagia
- House: Gurieli
- Father: George V Gurieli
- Mother: Mariam Bagrationi
- Religion: Georgian Orthodox Church

Kaikhosro IV Gurieli (Georgian: ქაიხოსრო IV გურიელი; died 1829) was a member of the House of Gurieli, a ruling dynasty of the Principality of Guria in western Georgia, which he de facto ruled as regent for his underage nephew Mamia V Gurieli from 1797 to 1809. An energetic and learned man, he presided over a series of measures which brought relative order and stability to Guria. Kaikhosro remained influential even after conceding ruling powers to Mamia V in 1809. Despite rapprochement with the Russian Empire, Kaikhosro was suspicious of the Russian intentions. While Mamia remained loyal to Russia, Kaikhosro became involved in an uprising against the Russian hegemony in western Georgia in 1820. After the rebels' defeat, Kaikhosro had to flee to the Ottoman territory, where he died in 1829.

== Early career ==
Kaikhosro Gurieli was the third son of George V Gurieli, Prince-regnant of Guria. As a young man, he was educated at the Georgian Orthodox Gelati Monastery near Kutaisi, the capital of the Kingdom of Imereti. The choice of a career in the clergy for Kaikhosro was aimed at having him become the Bishop of Shemokmedi, a principal diocese in Guria. He had command of several languages and was able to read old authors in Greek and Latin.

On the death of his brother, Prince-regnant Simon III Gurieli, in 1792, the government of Guria was taken over by another brother, Vakhtang III Gurieli, on account of Simon's son and heir Mamia being underage. Simon's widow Marine accused Vakhtang of persecution of her family and sought protection from Kaikhosro, who unfrocked himself and returned to Guria in 1797. That same year, Kaikhosro deposed and expelled Vakhtang, making Mamia prince-regnant and himself a regent, a position he nominally shared with the dowager-princess Marine.

== Regency ==
Once in power, Kaikhosro Gurieli embarked on an energetic campaign to stabilize the impoverished principality, troubled by internal dissensions, Ottoman encroachments, abductions and slave-trade. He summoned joint lay and church councils, threatened slave traders with death, and persecuted the recalcitrant nobles, accused of being pro-Ottoman or involved in slave-trading. Kaikhosro had the notoriously unruly Davit Asatiani murdered—sending this nobleman's foster-father to lure him out so that he could be shot dead—and stormed Asatiani's castle of Askana. The castle of Lanchkhuti, defiantly defended by Zabuedil Zhordania, fell next. Kaikhosro's dispossessed brother Vakhtang, returning from his exile, was likewise prevented from regaining his estates.

Kaikhosro Gurieli sought to solidify his authority and achievements by placing Guria under protection of the expanding Russian Empire, but he was against conceding Guria's self-rule. In 1804, King Solomon II of Imereti was compelled to accept the Russian "treaty of protection", which, inter alia, recognized Guria as an Imeretian subject, thus making it an indirect Russian dependency. The Gurieli government had to accept the provision, but pushed for the efforts to conclude a separate treaty with Russia bypassing Imereti. This was effected after Russia annexed Imereti by force of arms in 1810. By that time, Kaikhosro had relinquished his powers to his nephew Mamia, but still wielded significant influence on the politics of Guria. He tried to dissuade Mamia from signing two articles in the treaty with Russia stipulating that Gurian subjects were to be tried by the Imperial Russian law and deprived the government of Guria of the privilege to tax transit trade. On the occasion of finalizing the Russo–Gurian treaty in 1811, Kaikhosro Gurieli was granted by the Russian government the rank of podpolkovnik (lieutenant-colonel), but "this wily man" continued to be treated with caution and suspicion.

== 1820 rebellion ==
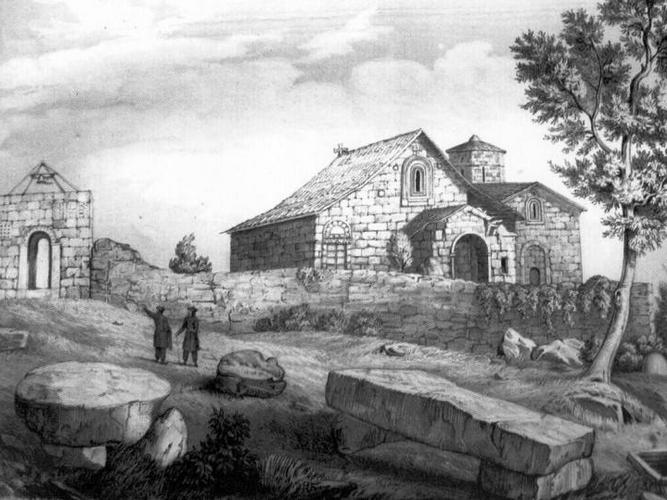
The Shemokmedi Monastery and ruined Gurieli castle in the 1830s.

In 1820, Kaikhosro offered shelter to the fugitive Imeretian prince Ivane Abashidze, Mamia Gurieli's brother-in-law, who had led a rebel faction against the Russian suppression of Imereti's church institutions. In March 1820, a Russian force moved into Guria to capture Abashidze; Mamia cooperated with the Russians, but Kaikhosro refused to surrender the refugee. The Russian commander, Colonel Puzyrevsky, was killed by a Gurian on the road to Kaikhosro's castle at Shemokmedi when the officer lashed out with his whip; his troops retreated. The Russian commander-in-chief in the Caucasus, General Yermolov, pronounced Kaikhosro a traitor and held him personally responsible for Puzyrevsky's death. Guria rose up, but the rebels were overwhelmed by General Velyaminov's artillery. The castle of Shemokmedi, dubbed by the Russian officials "an abode of brigandage", was captured and razed to the ground in an act of revenge in July 1820. Kaikhosro fled to the Ottoman possessions. He settled in Kobuleti and refused to return to Guria even after the Russian authorities amnestied him in 1822. He kept correspondence with Mamia and died in exile in 1829.

== Family ==
Malakia, son of Kaikhosro IV Gurieli.

Kaikhosro Gurieli was married twice. His first wife was Makidjaspi, daughter of Prince Rostom Nakashidze; the second was Elisabed, daughter of Prince Kaikhosro Eristavi-Shervashidze. After Kaikhosro's death in exile, his family were granted permission by the Russian government to return in 1831 and received some estates in Guria in 1835. His sons were subsequently enlisted in the Imperial Russian Army.

- Prince Malakia (1818–1858), podporuchik of the Russian army in 1850. He was married to Princess Tamar Tsulukidze and had issue.
- Princess Despine (1820–1885). She was married to Prince Tariel Bagration-Davydov, grandson of King David II of Imereti.
- Prince Dimitri (1822–1882), major-general of the Russian army (1875) and participant of the Crimean and Turkish wars. His mansion survives in the town of Ozurgeti.
- Princess Pelagia (born 1823), lady-in-waiting. She was married to Prince Nestor Tsereteli.
