= George V Gurieli =

Prince of Guria
- 1st reign: 1756–1758
- Predecessor: Mamia IV Gurieli
- Successor: Mamia IV Gurieli
- 2nd reign: 1765–1771
- Predecessor: Mamia IV Gurieli
- Successor: Mamia IV Gurieli
- 3rd reign: 1776–1788
- Predecessor: Mamia IV Gurieli
- Successor: Simon III Gurieli
- Died: 1788
- Spouse: Mariam Bagrationi
- Issue Among others: Simon III Gurieli; Vakhtang III Gurieli; Kaikhosro IV Gurieli
- House: Gurieli
- Father: George IV Gurieli
- Religion: Georgian Orthodox Church (Catholicate of Abkhazia)

George V Gurieli (Georgian: გიორგი V გურიელი, romanized: giorgi V gurieli; died 1788), of the western Georgian House of Gurieli, was Prince of Guria from 1756 to 1758 and again from 1765 to 1771 and from 1776 to 1788.

== Biography ==
George was a son of George IV Gurieli and a younger brother of Mamia IV Gurieli. He was installed by King Solomon I of Imereti as Prince-regnant of Guria, in 1756, in place of Mamia, who had been involved in a revolt against Solomon four years earlier. Mamia was able to convince King Heraclius II of Georgia and the Ottoman Childir Eyalet to help him recover the throne and George was deposed in his favor. In 1765, Hasan Pasha of Akhaltsikhe, responding to Mamia's involvement in Solomon's anti-Ottoman endeavors, restored George in Guria. George then joined the Imeretian pretender Prince Teimuraz and duke of Racha in an Ottoman-sponsored revolt against Solomon, but they suffered defeat at Chkhari in 1768.

In 1770, Solomon took advantage of the ongoing Russo-Turkish War (1768–1774), crossed into Guria, where he defeated an Ottoman force marching from Batumi to Imereti, and, in 1771, deposed George in Mamia's favor. It was not until 1776 that George, exploiting the increasingly deteriorating relations between Solomon and Mamia, staged a coup against his brother and once again seized power in Guria. He then reconciled with Solomon and joined his expedition against the Ottoman-controlled Lower Guria and Adjara, once belonging to the Gurieli in 1784. The campaign ended in disaster for the Georgian rulers in March 1784, resulting in Guria's permanent loss of the Kobuleti area to the Ottoman Empire. Later that year, following Solomon's death, George Gurieli supported David II's bid for the crown of Imereti and fought the Ottoman-supported pretender, Prince Kaikhosro Abashidze. George ruled Guria for more years until 1788, when he, already seasoned and weary of political instability in his principality, abdicated in favor of his eldest son, Simon III Gurieli.

== Family ==
George V Gurieli was married to Princess Mariam Bagrationi. They had the following children:

- Simon III Gurieli (died 1792), Prince of Guria (r. 1788–1792);
- Vakhtang III Gurieli (died 1814 or 1825), Prince of Guria (r. 1792–1797);
- Kaikhosro IV Gurieli (died 1829), Prince of Guria (r. 1797–1809);
- Mamia, who died young;
- Levan, who married Princess Elisabed Anchabadze;
- David (died c. 1833), who married Princess Elene, daughter of Grigol Dadiani. In the 1820s, he opposed Russian hegemony over Guria and died in exile in the Ottoman Empire. David's two sons, Grigol (1819–1892) and Levan (1824–1888), served as generals in the Russian army, and he is the ancestor of the extant line of the House of Gurieli.
- Agata (fl. 1837), who married first Prince Alexander Machutadze and secondly Prince David Mikeladze;
- Elene, who married Prince Maksime Tavdgiridze (Suleiman-Beg).

== Bibliography ==
- Chkhataraishvili, Kveli (1959). გურიის სამთავრო : პოლიტიკური და სოციალურ-ეკონომიური ისტორიის ნარკვევი (in Georgian).

George V Gurieli House of Gurieli
Regnal titles
Preceded by Mamia IV Gurieli	Prince of Guria; 1756–1758	Succeeded by Mamia IV Gurieli
Preceded by Mamia IV Gurieli	Prince of Guria; 1765–1771	Succeeded by Mamia IV Gurieli
Preceded by Mamia IV Gurieli	Prince of Guria; 1776–1788	Succeeded by Simon III Gurieli
