= Vakhtang III Gurieli =

Prince of Guria
- Reign: 1792–1797
- Predecessor: Simon III Gurieli
- Successor: Kaikhosro IV Gurieli
- Died: 1814 (or 1825)
- Spouse: Mariam Orbeliani (m. 1798)
- Issue Among others: David
- House: Gurieli
- Father: George V Gurieli
- Mother: Mariam Bagrationi
- Religion: Georgian Orthodox Church (Catholicate of Abkhazia)

Vakhtang III Gurieli (Georgian: ვახტანგ II გურიელი; died 1814 or 1825), of the House of Gurieli, was Prince of Guria, in western Georgia, from 1792 to 1797. He succeeded on the death of his elder brother Simon III Gurieli and was deposed by a younger brother Kaikhosro IV Gurieli. Vakhtang's subsequent efforts to regain power were futile.

== Biography ==
Vakhtang Gurieli was the second son of George V Gurieli, Prince of Guria, who abdicated in favor of his eldest son Simon III Gurieli due to his old age and political instability in the principality in 1788. On his accession, Simon appeased Vakhtang's ambitions by granting him a fiefdom on the right bank of the Supsa River, with 500 households of serfs and vassal nobles. Vakhtang then proceeded to seize the land holdings of the Jumati Monastery and defied his brother's authority. On Simon's death in 1792, Vakhtang took advantage of minority of the late Gurieli's heir Mamia and seized the government of Guria, securing recognition by King Solomon II of Imereti and the nobility of Guria.

Vakhtang tried to deprive his nephew Mamia of the right of succession; Marine, the princess-dowager, accused him of persecution of her family. Marine and Mamia found protection under Simon's another brother, Kaikhosro, who exploited Vakhtang's vacillating position in the 1794 Imeretian civil war between Solomon II and David II and his subsequent rapprochement with the Ottoman Empire and deposed him in 1797. Mamia was installed as prince-regnant, with Kaikhosro and Marine sharing regency. Vakhtang was imprisoned, but soon released and forced into exile to the Imeretian court. He, however, soon lost the favor of Solomon II of Imereti and moved to the Ottoman provincial capital of Akhaltsikhe, where he was imprisoned, in 1804, by Selim, pasha of Akhaltsikhe, at Kaikhosro's request. In 1805, he was ransomed by his younger brother Davit through the intervention of Solomon II of Imereti, who preferred more amenable Vakhtang on the throne of Guria. Vakhtang as well as his rival brother Kaikhosro and nephew Mamia sought Russian support against each other. Vakhtang's claims to principate were rejected, but through the intercession of Prince Pavel Tsitsianov, the Russian commander in Georgia, he was permitted to return to Guria, where he was restored in his erstwhile estates.

== Family ==
Vakhtang Gurieli married, in 1798, Princess Mariam (died 1841), daughter of Prince Dimitri-Zaal Orbeliani. He had two sons and two daughters:

- Prince David (1802–1856), podporuchik of the Russian army in 1850. He was married to Princess Ekaterine, daughter of Didi-Niko Dadiani, one of their sons, Mamia Gurieli (1836–1891), being a poet of some note;
- Prince Constantine, died in childhood;
- An unnamed daughter, who married to Prince Tavdgiridze;
- An unnamed daughter, who married to Prince David Mikeladze.

Vakhtang III Gurieli House of Gurieli
Regnal titles
Preceded by Simon III Gurieli	Prince of Guria; 1792–1797	Succeeded by Kaikhosro IV Gurieli
