= Battle of Rukhi =

1779 armed conflict in Caucasia

Battle of Rukh
Date	1779
Location	Rukh, Principality of Mingrelia
Result	Georgian victory

Belligerents
Kingdom of Imereti Principality of Guria; Principality of Mingrelia	Ottoman Empire: Principality of Abkhazia; Crimean Khanate

Commanders and leaders
Solomon I Katsia II Dadiani; Giorgi V Gurieli	Kelesh Ahmed-Bey Sharvashidze

The Battle of Rukh (Georgian: რუხის ბრძოლა) was fought in 1779 between the combined armies of the Kingdom of Imereti, and the Principalities of Mingrelia and Guria against the Ottoman Empire.

== Background ==
In November 1774, Solomon I sent Davit Kvinikhidze as ambassador to Russia, who brought with him an official request to Empress Catherine II to turn Imereti into a Russian protectorate. But by this time the Treaty of Küçük Kaynarca (July 10–21, 1774) had already been concluded, the results of which Solomon learned from a letter sent by Catherine. According to Article 23 of this treaty, Russia recognized the right of the Ottoman Empire to Western Georgia under certain conditions - recognized fortresses in Imereti captured by Russian artillery as inviolate. The Turks had no more rights to slaves from Imereti, and had to pardon any Imeretian who had attacked them. Nor could Ottomans infringe the rights of Christians.

== Battle ==
In 1779, in order to remove an ally from Solomon I, on the instructions of the Ottoman government, a large army consisting of Abkhazians and North-West Caucasian raiders (Jiks, Ossetians, Circassians, Balkars and Crimean Tatars) invaded the Principality of Mingrelia. Katsia II Dadiani appealed to the king of Imereti for help. Solomon helped Dadiani with the army of Imereti and Guria, quickly moved to Mingrelia and together with Dadiani won a decisive victory in the battle at Rukhi Castle. The victory at Rukhi stopped the expansion of the Turks in Georgia from the North-west for a long time. Katsia then intervened in Abkhazia, helping Zurab Shervashidze briefly oust Kelesh Bey from Sukhumi.

== Sources ==
- Rayfield, Donald (2012). Edge of Empires, a History of Georgia. London: Reaktion Books. ISBN 978-1-78023-070-2.
- Beradze, T (1980). "კაცია II დადიანი [Katsia II Dadiani]". ქართული საბჭოთა ენციკლოპედია, ტ. 5 [Georgian Soviet Encyclopedia, Vol. 5] (in Georgian). Tbilisi: Metsniereba. p. 444.
