= Alexander Imeretinsky =

Russian Governor-General of Warsaw

Alexander Bagration-Imeretinsky
- ალექსანდრე კონსტანტინეს ძე ბაგრატიონ-იმერეტინსკი
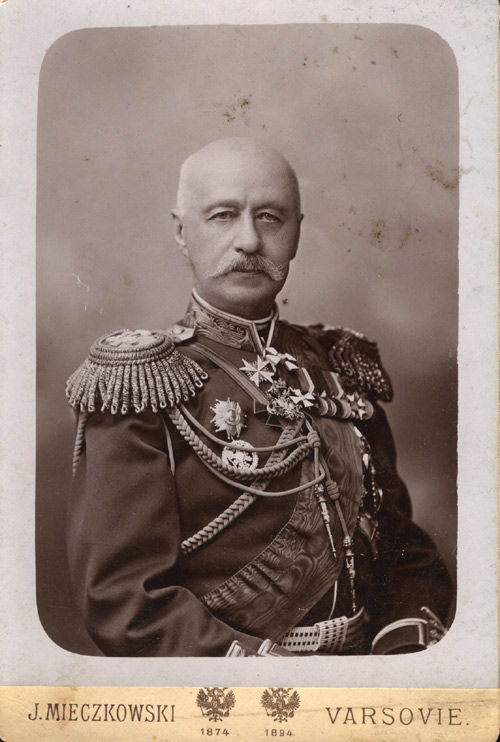
- Imeretinsky as full general, before 1900
- Born: 24 September 1837; Moscow
- Died: 17 November 1900 (aged 63)
- Parent(s): Prince Constantine; Ekaterina Strakhova

Governor-General of Warsaw (Viceroy)
- Preceded by: Count Paul Shuvalov
- Succeeded by: Michail Ivanovich Chertkov
- Military career
- Spouse: Countess Anna Mordvinova
- Allegiance: Russian Empire
- Rank: Adjutant general in the rank of General of the Infantry
- Unit: Tiflis Grenadier Regiment
- Commands: 6th Army Corps; Russian army in Warsaw; Russian army in Turkey; Warsaw Military District; Petersburg Military District; Governor-general of Warsaw
- Awards: Weapons: Gold Sword for Bravery

Alexander Konstantinovich Bagration-Imeretinsky (Georgian: ალექსანდრე კონსტანტინეს ძე ბაგრატიონ-იმერეტინსკი (Aleksandre Konstantines dze Bagration-Imeretinski), Russian: Алекса́ндр Константи́нович Имере́тинский, Polish: Aleksandr Imeretyński) (24 September 1837 - 17 November 1900) was a Georgian royal prince (batonishvili) and a General of the Russian Imperial Army. A hero of the Russo-Turkish War of 1877, he served as Governor-General of Warsaw in Poland, where he was known for his liberal policies that ultimately led to his replacement by the Russian authorities. As a general he has also been described as calm, morally balanced, and relatively humble in the success of his duties.

== Family ==
Alexander Imeretinsky was born in Moscow Gubernia on 24 September 1837 to a Georgian royal family of Imeretinsky, a sub branch of the Bagrationi dynasty. His father, Prince Constantine of Imereti was a head of the royal house of the former Kingdom of Imereti (annexed by Russia in 1810) and a Major General in Russian army. Imeretinsky graduated from Page Corps in Saint Petersburg.

== Imperial Russian service ==
In 1855 Imeretinsky served in a mounted Imperial Guard pioneer squadron. From 1856 to 1859 he took part in the Caucasian War against Chechens and Dagestanis with a Georgian Grenadier Regiment, during which he was promoted to lieutenant colonel upon request on January 31, 1857. He then studied at the Nicholas General Staff Academy (1859–1863). He took part in suppressing the Polish January Uprising in 1863, earning the Captaincy for Distinguished Service on July 4 of that year, and in 1876 became chief of staff of the Russian Army in Warsaw. Consequently, Imteretinsky was appointed commander of the Warsaw Military District in 1869.

During the Russo-Turkish War (1877–1878) he led the Second Infantry Division in the Battle of Lovcha together with Mikhail Skobelev, and participated in the Siege of Plevna. After the storming of Plevna he was promoted to Lieutenant General and earned the Order of St. George 4th Class on August 22. In 1879 he became the chief of the Petersburg Military District. From 1881 to 1886 he acted as Military Procurator-in-Chief of Russia and was responsible among other things, for the investigation and persecution of the organizers of the murder of Emperor Alexander II of Russia (1881). In 1882 Imeretinsky became a member of State Council of Imperial Russia.

=== Governor-General of Warsaw ===
In 1897 he replaced Pavel Andreyevich Shuvalov as the Governor-general of Warsaw. He was a supporter of Polish-Russian cooperation, and thought that Poles would voluntarily integrate themselves into the Russian Empire if given the choice and fair treatment. For that reason he removed some restrictive laws, such as one that forbade use of the Polish language in schools, and dismissed the unpopular overseer of education system, Alexander Apuchtin. With the influence of Emperor Nicholas II, other restrictive laws on Catholicism and the Polish press were also softened. Imeretinsky also gave permission to erect a monument to Adam Mickiewicz, the great Polish poet.

He was criticized for his liberal stance by certain Russian and Polish factions. After the Polish Socialist Party published an article critical of Imeretinsky's liberal policy in 1898, it gained much notoriety, and Imeretinsky was dismissed in 1900, dying on 17 November that year.

== Awards ==
- Order of St. Anna, 2nd class (1866) and 1st class (1875)
- Order of St. Vladimir, 3rd class (1871), 2nd class (1879) and 1st class (1896)
- Order of St. Stanislaus, 1st class (1873)
- Golden Sword for Bravery (1877)
- Order of St. George, 4th class (1877) and 3rd class (1877)
- Order of the White Eagle (1882)
- Order of St. Alexander Nevsky (1885)
- Grand Cross (1st Class) Mahavarabhorn, Order of the White Elephant of Siam (1897)
- Captaincy for Distinguished Service (1863)
