= Princess Rodam of Imereti =

Rodam

Princess consort of Guria
- Tenure: 1732–1756; 1758–1765
- Died: 1770
- Spouse: Mamia IV Gurieli (m. 1732)
- Dynasty: Bagrationi
- Father: Alexander V of Imereti
- Mother: Mariam Dadiani
- Religion: Georgian Orthodox Church

Rodam (Georgian: როდამ; died 1770) was a Georgian royal princess (batonishvili) of the Bagrationi dynasty of Imereti and the wife of Mamia IV Gurieli, Prince of Guria. She was the daughter of King Alexander V of Imereti and the sister of King Solomon I of Imereti.

== Biography ==
Rodam was the daughter of King Alexander V of Imereti and his first wife, Mariam, daughter of Bezhan Dadiani, Prince of Mingrelia. She was the sister of King Solomon I of Imereti.

In 1732, Rodam married Mamia IV Gurieli, Prince of Guria. Her father, Alexander V, gave her the Sajavakho region as a dowry. The couple had no children.

Rodam is mentioned in a deed of donation dated 10 February 1760. In 1769, while suffering from an illness, she donated the brothers Iob and Nicholas Tuskia, together with their wives, children, serfs, and servants, to the Virgin Mary of Bichvinta in the hope of recovering from her illness. The subsequent course of her illness is unknown. She died in 1770. Mamia IV Gurieli subsequently married a woman from the Tavdgiridze family.

== Bibliography ==
- Soselia, Olgha (1990). ნარკვევები ფეოდალური ხანის დასავლეთ საქართველოს სოციალურ-პოლიტიკური ისტორიიდან. წიგნი III: სათავადოები (in Georgian). Tbilisi: Metsniereba. ISBN 5-520-00728-4.
