= Simon Imeretinsky =

Simon Imeretinsky may refer to:

- Simon Imeretinsky (born 1771), Georgian royal prince
- Simon Imeretinsky (born 1812), Georgian royal prince
