= General Bagration =

General Bagration may refer to:

- Dmitry Bagration (1863–1919), Imperial Russian Army lieutenant general
- Ivan Vakhushtovich Bagration (1725–1781), Imperial Russian Army lieutenant general
- Kiril Bagration (1749–1828), Imperial Russian Army major general
- Pyotr Romanovich Bagration (1818–1876), Imperial Russian Army lieutenant general
- Pyotr Bagration (1765–1812), Imperial Russian Army general of the infantry
- Roman Bagration (1778–1834), Imperial Russian Army lieutenant general

== See also ==
- Alexander Bagration-Imeretinsky (1796–1862), Imperial Russian Army general of the cavalry
- Dmitry Bagration-Imeretinsky (1799–1845), Imperial Russian Army major general
