= Ana Orbeliani =

Queen of Imereti (1784–1789, 1790–1791)

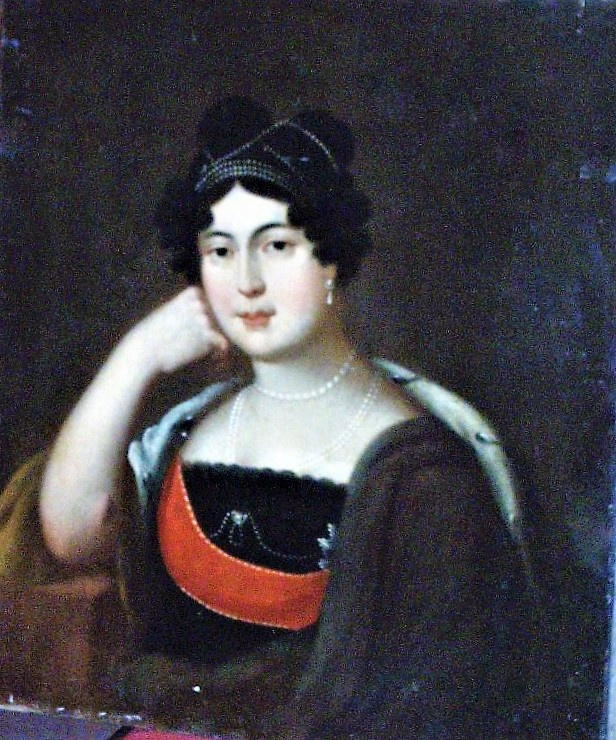

Queen consort of Imereti
- Tenure: 1784–1788
- Born: 17 July 1765; Kingdom of Kartli-Kakheti
- Died: 4 June 1832 (aged 66); Moscow
- Burial: Donskoy Monastery
- Spouse: David II of Imereti (m. 1781; died 1795)
- Issue: Prince Constantine
- House: Orbeliani (by birth); Bagrationi (by marriage)
- Father: Prince Mamuka Orbeliani
- Mother: Princess Maria Kvenipneveli
- Religion: Georgian Orthodox Church

Ana Orbeliani (Georgian: ანა ორბელიანი; 17 July 1765 – 4 June 1832) was a queen consort of the western Georgian kingdom of Imereti as the wife of King David II (r. 1784–1789). After David's deposition and death in exile in 1795, Ana tried to secure succession for her son Constantine during the reign of Solomon II, who had supplanted her husband. In her efforts, Ana relied on the Russian Empire, which eventually annexed Imereti in 1810. Ana spent the rest of her life in Russia, where she was known as tsaritsa Anna Matveyevna Imeretinskaya (Russian: Анна Матвеевна Имеретинская).

== Early life and marriage ==
Ana was born into the House of Orbeliani, one of the leading princely houses (tavadi) of the Kingdom of Kartli-Kakheti (eastern Georgia). Her father was Prince Mamuka (Makarius) Jambakurian Orbeliani, a sisterly nephew of Heraclius II of Georgia. Her mother Princess Mariam (Maria), came of the house of Kvenipneveli, hereditary Dukes of the Ksani. After her father's death in 1770 Ana and her brothers were reared at the court of Heraclius in Tbilisi. Around 1781, Ana was married off to the Imeretian prince David, who had found shelter in Tbilisi after being part of a plot against his cousin, Solomon I of Imereti. Later, David returned to Imereti, bringing his wife with him. He seized the throne of Imereti in a power struggle in 1784, but was eventually toppled down by Solomon II, Heraclius II's maternal grandson. David went in exile, giving Solomon his wife Ana and his heir Constantine as hostages.

== Misfortunes ==
Following David's last futile attempt at coming back and his death in exile in 1795, Constantine was incarcerated by Solomon, while Ana was subjected to continuous harassment. She was still able to rebury her husband's remains from Akhaltsikhe to a familial burial ground at the Jruchi cathedral. Ana applied for protection to Heraclius, who granted her a hereditary estate in the Khepiniskhevi valley, at the border with Imereti, in 1798. After the death of Heraclius in 1798, Ana's vicissitudes continued. Prince Gogia Abashidze encroached on her lands, while Solomon II pressured her to move to Kutaisi. To this end, he sent troops to Ana's estate in March 1802. The queen's men resisted, giving her a means to escape, through forests, to Surami, where she was rescued by the Russian troops under Captain Bartyenyev. She repaired to Saint Petersburg to solicit the help of Tsar Alexander I of Russia to secure the release of her son and then to guarantee him succession to the childless king Solomon.

== In Russia ==
Under the Russian pressure, Solomon finally released Constantine in 1803 and, as part of his agreement with Russia, made the young prince his heir apparent in 1804. The Russian state confirmed this arrangement and, further, allowed Ana to retain the title of Queen (tsaritsa) for her lifetime on 12 September 1804. She had also been decorated with the Order of Saint Catherine, Grand Cross. But the mother and the son now faced relocation to Russia proper envisaged by the Tsar. That same year, Constantine protested and escaped to Imereti, where he reconciled with Solomon and remained loyal to him until the Russian army finally conquered Imereti in March 1810.

The Russians were suspicious of Ana's involvement in Constantine's defection. On 28 May 1809, she had to agree to relocate for resettlement from Tiflis to St. Petersburg, where she lived, on a modest state pension, with her daughter-in-law and grandson. She maintained contacts with the local Georgian men of culture and had several manuscripts copied. Ana vainly sought to reclaim her and Constantine’s estates in Imereti or be monetarily compensated for her loss and to have the right to return to Imereti.

In 1811, she organized a small chapel of the Nativity of Jesus in a rented house near St. Vladimir's Cathedral, which functioned until after her death. She died in Moscow in 1832 and was buried at the Donskoy Monastery.

== Ancestry ==
Ancestors of Ana Orbeliani

16. Prince Tamaz Orbeliani
8. Prince Mamuka Orbeliani
17. Princess Khampervan N.
4. Prince Dimitri Orbeliani
2. Prince Mamuka Orbeliani
20. Heraclius I of Kakheti
10. Teimuraz II
21. Princess Anna Cholokashvili
5. Princess Anna of Kakheti
22. Vakhtang VI
11. Tamar of Kartli
23. Rusudan of Circassia
1. Princess Ana Orbeliani
6. Prince Giorgi Kvenipneveli
3. Princess Maria Kvenipneveli
