= Alexander Bagration-Imeretinsky (1796–1862) =

Georgian prince (1796–1862)

General, nobleman Alexander Bagration-Imeretinsky
- Born: 1796
- Died: 1862 (aged 65–66)
- Military career
- Allegiance: Russian Empire
- Branch: Imperial Russian Army
- Service years: 1811–1862
- Rank: Adjutant general in the rank of General of the cavalry
- Unit: Uhlans of the Imperial Guard
- Commands: Light cavalry division
- Conflicts: French invasion of Russia; Decembrist revolt Russo-Turkish War (1828–1829)
- Awards: Weapons: Gold Sword for Bravery

Alexander Bagration-Imeretinsky (Georgian: ალექსანდრე ბაგრატიონ-იმერეტინსკი, Alek'sandre Bagration-Imeretinski; Russian: Александр Георгиевич Багратион-Имеретинский, Aleksandr Georgyevich Bagration-Imeretinsky; 1796 — 5 February 1862) was a Georgian royal prince of the Bagrationi dynasty of Imereti and a general in Imperial Russian service.

Prince Alexander was a son of Prince George of Imereti, grandson of King Solomon I of Imereti, by his wife, Princess Darejan, of the Eristavi of Racha. From July to September 1810, the young prince Alexander fought under the Russian general Simonovich against his relative, King Solomon II of Imereti, who had held Alexander's father captive for nine years. Alexander's services were duly rewarded; The Russian government granted a pension to his mother and allowed him and his brother, Dimitri, to enlist in the Page Corps. In 1811, Prince Alexander received a commission as a cornet of the Imperial Guard's Uhlans. He fought against Napoleon's Grande Armée in 1812, the Decembrist revolutionaries in 1825, and Ottomans in 1828. His promotions were those to the rank of colonel in 1827, major-general in 1835, lieutenant-general in 1844, adjutant-general in 1852, and general of cavalry in 1860. In 1855, he was a commander of the reserve light cavalry division. He was awarded Order of St. George and a gold sword. Alexander Bagration-Imeretinsky died in St. Petersburg and was buried in the Alexander Nevsky Lavra.
