= Prince George of Imereti =

- Born: 1778
- Died: 20 November 1807 (aged 28–29); Saint Petersburg, Russian Empire
- Spouse: Darejan Eristavi-Sharvashidze
- Issue: Prince Alexander; Prince Dmitry
- Dynasty: Bagrationi
- Father: Prince Alexander of Imereti
- Mother: Mariam Zhghenti
- Religion: Georgian Orthodox Church (Catholicate of Abkhazia)

George (Georgian: გიორგი, romanized: giorgi; 1778 – 20 November 1807) was a Georgian prince of the Bagrationi house of Imereti and claimant to the crown of Imereti. He was the ancestor of the Bagration-Imeretinsky royal family of the Russian Empire.

== Biography ==
George was a illegitimate and the only son of Prince Alexander, son of Solomon I of Imereti. Alexander had led an abortive revolt against Solomon in 1778, but then reconciled with him. He died before his father and Solomon's death in 1784 left the issue of Imeretian succession open to rivaling claims. George was designed as heir apparent at Solomon's death, but was prevented from being crowned by Solomon's cousin David II, who was in turn overthrown by Solomon's nephew Solomon II. The latter arrested George as a pretender to the throne and imprisoned him at the Mukhuri castle in 1795. George was able to escape on 15 October 1806 and fled to the Russian Empire where he spent his last years, writing memoirs of his life. He died of smallpox at Saint Petersburg and was buried there, at the St. Alexander Nevsky Convent.

== Family ==
George was married to Darejan (1780–1816), daughter of Rostom Eristavi-Shervashidze. Following the Russian conquest of the Kingdom of Imereti in 1810, Darejan and her sons were deported to Russia proper. They had two sons, both of whom became generals in the Russian Army:

- Prince Alexander (1796–1862);
- Prince Dmitry (1799–1845).
