= Princess Helen of Georgia =

Princess Helen
- Born: 1753
- Died: 17 June 1786 (aged 32–33)
- Spouse: Prince Archil of Imereti (m. 1770; died 1784) Zakaria Andronikashvili (m. 1785)
- Issue: From 1st marriage: Solomon II of Imereti; Princess Barbare; Princess Mariam; From 2nd marriage: Princess Khoreshan
- Dynasty: Bagrationi
- Father: Heraclius II of Georgia
- Mother: Darejan Dadiani
- Religion: Georgian Orthodox Church

Helen (Georgian: ელენე, romanized: elene; 1753 – 17 June 1786) was a Georgian princess royal (batonishvili), a daughter of Heraclius II of Georgia. She was the mother of Solomon II of Imereti, the last king to have reigned in the Georgian polities.

== Biography ==
Helen was born in 1753 as the eldest child of Heraclius II and his third wife Darejan Dadiani. The young princess had a love affair with Prince Zakaria Andronikashvili (1740–1802), a respected soldier, who was 13 years older. Opposing the union, King Heraclius forced Andronikashvili into retirement to the Russian Empire and in 1770 married Helen off to Archil, a younger brother of King Solomon I of Imereti. Archil died on 6 October 1775, leaving one son and two daughters behind. Heraclius, watching his daughter plunging in depression, allowed her to wed, in 1785, the love of her youth, Zakaria Andronikashvili. Helen died on 17 June 1786 soon after she gave birth to a daughter, Khoreshan.

== Children and descendants ==
Helen had three children of her first marriage to Prince Archil of Imereti, one son and two daughters. Their son, David (born 1772), went on to become king of Imereti under the name of Solomon II with the help of his grandfather Heraclius II and stepfather Prince Andronikashvili in 1789. The elder daughter, Barbare (born 1771), would marry Prince David Tsulukidze and end her days in exile in Russia after the Russian conquest of Imereti in 1810. The younger daughter, Mariam (Maia; 1775–1861), was married twice, first to Prince Levan Dadiani (1774–1847) and then to Prince Malkhaz Andronikashvili (1773–1822), becoming mother of General Ivane Andronikashvili of the Crimean War fame.

Helen's daughter of the second marriage, Khoreshan (1786–1833), married in 1800 Prince Zurab (Dimitri) Orbeliani (1766–1827). This union produced five children, among them the poet and general Grigol Orbeliani (1804–1883), General Ilia Orbeliani (1815–1853), Colonel Zakaria Orbeliani (1806–1847) and Ephemia (1801–1849), mother of the popular Romanticist poet Nikoloz Baratashvili (1817–1845).

== Ancestry ==
Ancestors of Princess Helen of Georgia

16. Prince David of Kakheti
8. Heraclius I of Kakheti
17. Elene Diasamidze
4. Teimuraz II
18. Shermazan Cholokashvili
9. Ana Cholokashvili
2. Heraclius II of Georgia
20. Prince Levan of Kartli
10. Vakhtang VI
21. Tuta Guriel
5. Tamar of Kartli
22. Kelchiko of Kabarda
11. Rusudan of Circassia
1. Elene
24. George IV Dadiani
12. Bezhan Dadiani
25. Sevdia Mikeladze
6. Katsia-Giorgi Dadiani
26. Gelovani
13. Tamar Gelovani
3. Darejan Dadiani
