= Prince Rostom of Imereti =

Rostom
- Prince of Imereti
- Born: 1791
- Died: c. 1840 (aged 48–49)
- Spouse: Elisabed Mkheidze
- Issue: Simon (born 1812); Mzekhatun (born 1814); Irine (born 1816); Ephrosine (born 1818); Anastasia (Pakhua) (born 1820)
- Father: Prince Simon of Imereti
- Occupation: Soldier

Rostom (Georgian: როსტომი) (1791 – c. 1840) was a Georgian royal prince (batonishvili) of the royal Bagrationi dynasty of Imereti.

Rostom was a son of Prince Simon, a natural son of Prince Bagrat. He was, thus, a great-grandson of King Alexander V of Imereti. In 1819, Rostom, aged 20, joined his cousins, David and Vakhtang, in a revolt against the Russian Empire, which had absorbed Imereti in 1810. The revolt spread to Guria and Mingrelia, but was squashed by the Russian troops under General Velyaminov by July 1820. The remaining rebels retreated to the mountains of Racha, where they were finally defeated. Prince David died on the battlefield and Vakhtang fled to the Ottoman Empire. Rostom was captured and, together with his family, sent in exile to Russia proper, where he was enlisted as a private in the Sumsky Hussar Regiment.

Rostom was married to Elisabed Mkheidze (1794–1862) and had 5 children with her.

Rostom is sometimes confused with his namesake Imeretian prince, who was a natural son of David II of Imereti and ancestor of the Imeretian family of Bagration-Davydov.
