= Prince Bagrat of Imereti (1741–1800) =

Georgian royal (1741–1800)

- Born: 1741
- Died: 1800 (aged 58–59)
- Spouse: Mariam Eristavi-Sharvashidze
- Issue: Prince Simon (ill.); Prince David
- Dynasty: Bagrationi
- Father: Alexander V of Imereti
- Mother: Tamar Abashidze
- Religion: Georgian Orthodox Church (Catholicate of Abkhazia)

Bagrat (Georgian: ბაგრატი, romanized: bagrat'i; 1741–1800) was a Georgian royal prince (batonishvili) of the Bagrationi dynasty of Imereti. He was the common ancestor of all male-line descendants of the kings of Imereti, surviving into the 21st century.

== Biography ==
Prince Bagrat was a younger of King Alexander V of Imereti by his wife, Tamar Abashidze. He was, thus, a younger brother of King Solomon I of Imereti and an uncle of Solomon II, the last reigning monarch of Imereti. Prince Bagrat was married to Mariam (1741–1820), daughter of Prince George, Eristavi of Guria. He had two children:

- Prince Simon (born 1771), a natural son, forefather of the noble (aznauri) family of Bagration, which is the only branch of the Imeretian Bagrationi still surviving in Georgia in a male line.
- Prince David (1781-1820), a son by Princess Mariam. He was the ancestor of the Princes Bagration, which became extinct in male line in 1937.
