= Simon III =

Simon III may refer to:

- Simon III, Count of Saarbrücken (c. 1180–1243)
- Simon III, Lord of Lippe (c. 1340–1410)
- Simon III of Isenburg-Kempenich (ruled 1367–1420)
- Simon III Gurieli (died 1792), Georgian Prince of Guria 1788–1792
