= Battle of Chkheri =

1774 Battle between the Kingdom of Imereti and the Ottoman Empire

- Part of Russo-Turkish War (1768–1774)
Date	February 6, 1774
Location	Chkherimel river valley 42°0′3.3″N 43°13′41.9″E
Result	Georgian victory

Belligerents
Kingdom of Imereti; Kingdom of Kartli-Kakheti	Ottoman Empire

Commanders and leaders
Solomon I	(Ottoman Empire) Suleyman Pasha

Strength
Unknown; 2,000	4,000

Casualties and losses
50 killed 100 wounded	2,400 killed 600 captured

The Battle of Chkheri took place between the Kingdom of Imereti and the Ottoman Empire during the Russo-Turkish War (1768–1774), on February 6, 1774.

== Background ==
In 1773, Solomon I and Heraclius II signed an alliance treaty against the Ottomans. In the same year, the kings together with 11 thousand cavalry marched in Javakheti, captured Akhalkalaki, reached Kars and Ardahan. The Pasha of Childir Eyalet could not resist, they would have released Samtskhe, they would have abolished the Pasha of Childir Eyalet, but Solomon get seriously injury and this campaign was stopped because of that.

== Battle ==
In response to the Javakheti campaign, The Pasha of Childir Eyalet sent a 4,000-strong army to sack Imereti. At the same time, Pasha of Childir Eyalet appealed to Katsia II Dadiani and the eristavi of the Abkhazians against Solomon. According to the agreement with the eristavi of Samegrelo, they had to attack Imereti from two sides. The Abashidzes, the owners of Vakhani Castle, betrayed Solomon I and gave way to the enemy. Katsia II Dadiani also arrived at the border of Imereti. Solomon asked Heraclius II for help, Heraclius did not hesitate and sent 2,000 men to his rescue, forcing Katsia II Dadian to turn back. The Ottomans realized that they had fallen into a snare and began to retreat, but King Solomon cut off the retreat, led them to the Chkherimel river and defeated them on February 6, 1774. Rajab, a leader of Avars, who raided many times Kartli-Kakheti, will be captured, whom King Solomon sent to Heraclius as a gift.

== Aftermath ==
The victory in the Battle of Chkheri was of great importance, this was another defeat of Childir Eyalet and the Ottoman Empire in Imereti, and the sending of Heraclius II's auxiliary detachment and his correct action to neutralize Katsia II Dadiani played a major role in this victory. 3,000 men from the Ottoman Empire were killed or captured, only 50 Georgians were killed and 100 wounded.
