= Apukhtin =

Apukhtin (Russian: Апу́хтин) is a Russian surname and may refer to:

- Aleksey Apukhtin (1840–1893), Russian poet, writer and critic
- German Apukhtin (1936–2003), Soviet footballer
- Alexander Apukthin (1822–1903), superintendent of Congress Poland in the late 19th century
- Yuri Apukhtin (born 1948), Ukrainian politician, self-proclaimed governor of Kharkiv People's Republic
