= Prince David of Imereti =

Prince David
- Born: 1781
- Died: 1 September 1820 (aged 38–39)
- Spouse: Darejan of Racha
- Issue: Ivane; Mariam; Teimuraz; Nikoloz; Ekaterina; Beri
- Dynasty: Bagrationi
- Father: Prince Bagrat of Imereti (1741–1800)
- Mother: Mariam Eristavi-Sharvashidze
- Religion: Georgian Orthodox Church (Catholicate of Abkhazia)

David (Georgian: დავითი, romanized: daviti′; 1781 – 1 September 1820) was a Georgian royal prince (batonishvili) of the Bagrationi dynasty of Imereti. He was killed in a rebellion against the Russian rule in Imereti. He was the ancestor of the now-extinct line of Princes and Serene Princes Bagration.

== Biography ==
Prince David was a son of Prince Bagrat of Imereti by his wife Mariam, née Eristavi of Guria. He was, thus, a grandson of King Alexander V of Imereti, a nephew of King Solomon I, and a cousin of King Solomon II. By the time of the Russian conquest of Imereti in 1810, he lived in his family estate in Argveti. The Russian commander-in-chief in the Caucasus, General Tormasov, ordered to remove from Imereti all members of the royal family, who might have had "pernicious influence on the people". General Simonovich, a Russian commander in Imereti, interceded and asked Tormasov to allow Prince David to remain in homeland on account of his being "mentally retarded and not having any influence on the people". Tormasov refused with contempt and ordered that David be deported to Tbilisi, noting that "the Imeretian people are even more retarded and, out of their insanity, can follow anyone."

In June 1819, the people of Imereti rose in rebellion against the Russian encroachment on the local church. The uprising then spread to Guria and Mingrelia. Prince David became on the leaders of the movement in which the clerics, nobles, and peasants were involved. By July 1820, the Russian army under General Velyaminov was able to contain the revolt in Imereti; David and some other rebels withdrew into the mountains of Racha, where suffered a major defeat at the castle of Kvara. David was killed in the fighting; "the tsarevich David, son of Bagrat, one of the evilest brigands, is killed", the Russian commander-in-chief in the Caucasus, Aleksey Yermolov, reported to the Chief of General Staff Pyotr Volkonsky on 8 October 1820.

== Family and descendants ==
Prince David was married to Darejan, daughter of Vakhtang, Duke of Racha. Their children were:

- Prince Ivane (1810–1869), who married Elisabeth, daughter of Prince Bezhan Tsereteli, with issue;
- Princess Mariam (born 1812), who married Ivane (born 1806), son of Prince Anton Eristavi (Racha);
- Prince Teimuraz (born 1816);
- Prince Nikoloz (1818–1820);
- Princess Ekaterine (1819–1890), who married Nikoloz (1817–1914), son of Prince Grigol Eristavi-Sharvashidze;
- Prince Beri (fl. 1820).

David's descendants, in the persons of his two sons, Ivane and Teimuraz, were confirmed by the Governing Senate in the dignity of Princes Bagration (Князья Багратион) on 6 December 1850, with the addition of the style "Serene Highness" (Светлейший князь) to Ivane's son Alexander on 15 June 1881. This line became extinct with the execution of Alexander's son David in the Soviet Union in 1937 and the death of David's daughter Nino, Professor at Georgian Technical University, in Tbilisi in 2008.
