= Joseph, Catholicos of Abkhazia =

Catholicos Joseph
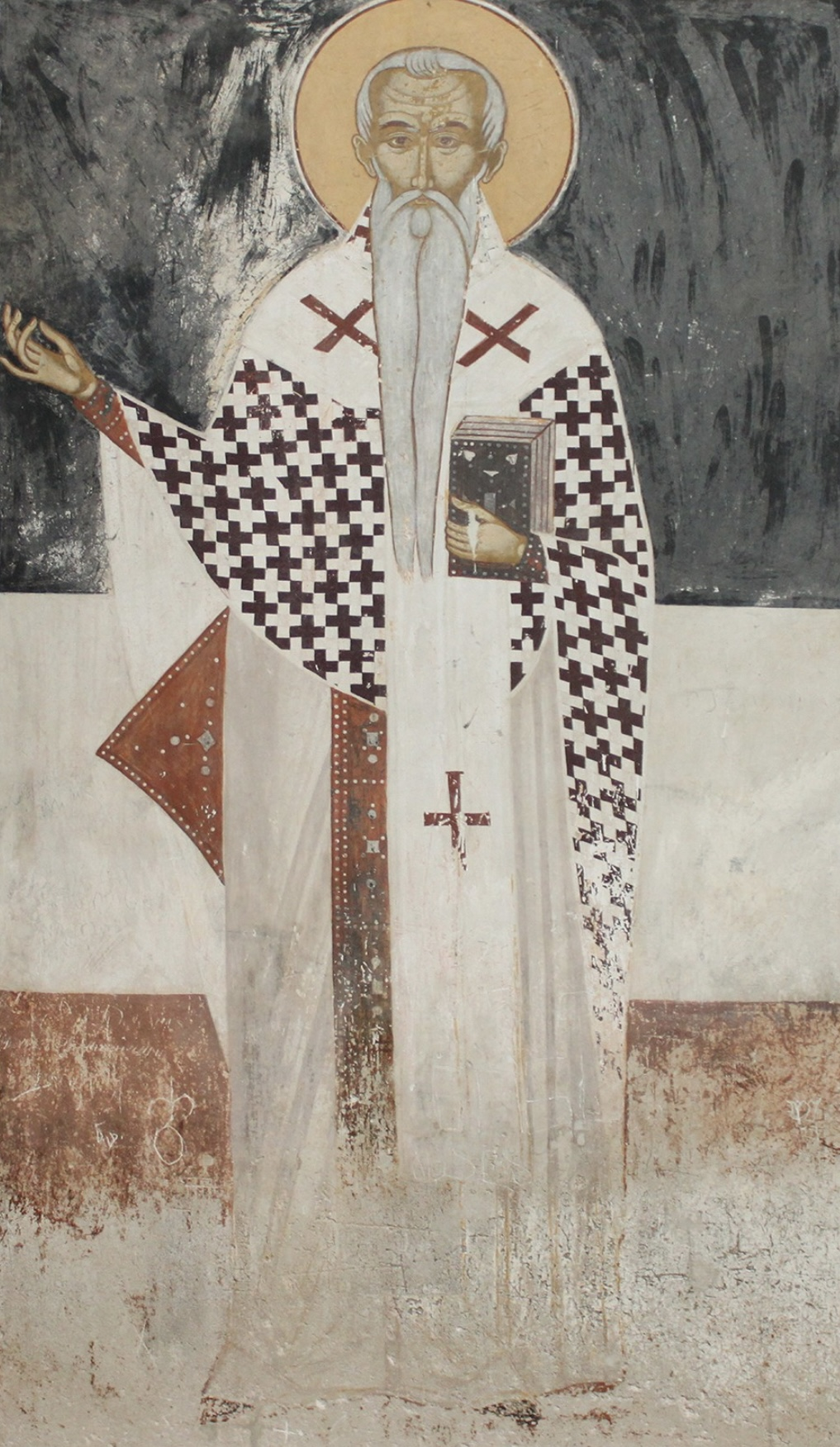

Catholicos of Abkhazia
- Tenure: 1769–1776
- Born: 1739
- Died: 1776 (aged 36–37)
- Burial: Gelati Monastery
- Dynasty: Bagrationi
- Father: Alexander V of Imereti
- Mother: Tamar Abashidze
- Religion: Georgian Orthodox Church (Catholicate of Abkhazia)
- Khelrtva

Joseph or Ioseb (Georgian: იოსები, romanized: iosebi; 1739 – 13 May 1776) was a Georgian Orthodox hierarch, Metropolitan bishop of Gelati (1760–1769), and Catholicos of Abkhazia (1769–1776). He was a younger son of King Alexander V of Imereti, of the Bagrationi dynasty. He was a major supporter of his brother, Solomon I of Imereti, in his efforts to consolidate royal authority.

== Career ==
Joseph was born in the family of Alexander V of Imereti and his wife, Tamar Abashidze. He pursued a clerical career, mostly at the major cathedral of Gelati near Imereti's capital of Kutaisi, and rose through ranks from a protoiereus to a bishop. In 1766, he was a chief negotiator on behalf of his brother, King Solomon I, who had been driven out of his capital in an Ottoman-supported coup in favor of his cousin, Teimuraz of Imereti. To help Solomon recover his crown, Joseph, went to Tbilisi, to King Heraclius II of Georgia, and then, accompanied by Heraclius's envoy, traveled to Constantinople for the negotiations with the Ottoman government. In the meantime, Solomon was able to defeat Teimuraz and focused on his recalcitrant subject Rostom, Duke of Racha. Rostom dispatched his brother Besarion, Catholicos of Abkhazia and, hence, the head of an Orthodox church in western Georgia, to the Ottoman pasha in Akhaltsikhe to ask aid against Solomon. In a countermove, Solomon dispatched Joseph with the promise of peace in exchange for the arrest of Catholicos Besarion. Solomon’s diplomacy won and Besarion was cast in prison in Akhaltsikhe, but he escaped to the Principality of Mingrelia and declared himself "catholicos" of the local Orthodox church. In his place, Solomon appointed Joseph, then aged 30. He was crowned at Gelati in March 1769.

In May 1769, Solomon sent Joseph to Racha to make peace with Rostom. The catholicos swore at the Barakoni Church that his brother king guaranteed security. Rostom agreed eagerly, but he was betrayed by Solomon, who had him captured during a banquet and had his eyes burned out. The duchy of Racha was abolished and its lands confiscated; some were granted to Joseph. In the years that followed, Joseph pushed for efforts to persuade the Mingrelian government to abolish the rival catholicate established by Rostom's fugitive brother Besarion. The negotiations were fruitless, but, after Besarion's death in 1773, no attempt was ever made to install a catholicos in Mingrelia.

Catholicos Joseph spared no effort to aggrandize his cathedral at Gelati. A new wall was constructed around it; several new estates, serf households, precious liturgical items, and a collection of manuscripts, including the 13th-century Vani Gospels, were donated to it. Donations were also sent to the Bichvinta Cathedral, an erstwhile seat of the catholicoi of Abkhazia. Joseph died in 1776, at the age of 37. He was buried at the Gelati monastery.
