= Teimuraz I (disambiguation) =

Teimuraz I was King of the Kakheti with intermissions from 1605 to 1648 and also of Kartli from 1625 to 1633.

Teimuraz I may also refer to:

- Teimuraz I, Prince of Mukhrani, Prince of Mukhrani from 1580 to 1625 and regent of the Kartli from 1623 to 1625.
- Teimuraz of Imereti, King of Imereti from 1766 to 1768.
