= Prince Vakhtang of Imereti (died 1850) =

Vakhtang (Georgian: ვახტანგ; died December 1850) was a member of the Imeretian branch of the Georgian Bagrationi dynasty, a grandson of King David II of Imereti. He was one of the leaders of the 1819–1820 rebellion against the Russian Empire and ended his days in exile in the Ottoman Empire.

== Family background ==
Vakhtang was a son of Prince Rostom, a natural son of King David II of Imereti, by Mariam Mikeladze. Rostom's status of a prince royal was recognized by the Russian Empire after extension of its protectorate over the Kingdom of Imereti in 1804. Vakhtang had a younger brother, Tariel, and probably a sister, Atato. The brothers were also known by the surname Bagration-Davydov, although, in the Russian Empire, the title of Princes Bagration-Davydov was officially confirmed in 1849 to another, Kakhetian line of the Bagrationi dynasty — Bagration-Davitishvili. The homonymy has led to some confusion in the genealogical literature as some scholars such as Cyril Toumanoff erred in making Solomon Bagration-Davydov—a son of Prince Rostom Bagration-Davitashvili—a son of Rostom, a natural son of King David II of Imereti.

== Rebellion ==
Vakhtang's involvement in politics first became visible in 1819, nine years after the Russians deposed his relative, King Solomon II and annexed Imereti. That year, what initially began as a protest against the Russian government's encroachment on the church in Imereti, escalated into a full-scale rebellion, involving nobles and peasants alike. Vakhtang, joined by other Imeretian royals such as Prince David and Prince Rostom, became one of the leaders of the movement, which quickly spread into neighboring Guria and Mingrelia. The Russian authorities declared him outlaw and ordered his family be placed under arrest. By July 1820, General Velyaminov succeeded in restoring most of Imereti to the Russian rule. The rebel princes withdrew into the mountains of Racha, where their forces were finally defeated. Prince David was killed in battle; Rostom was captured and deported to Russia's interior; Vakhtang fled to the Ottoman Empire, bringing with him his younger brother, Tariel. His mother, wife Dona Lordkipanidze, and daughter Anastasia, were seized by the Russian military and sent to Tbilisi.

== Exile ==
Fleeing from Imereti, Vakhtang and Tariel arrived in Akhaltsikhe and eventually settled in Trebizond, the city where Solomon II, the last king of Imereti, ended his days in exile. They lived on a pension granted by the Ottoman government. The Georgian historian Manana Khomeriki found a draft document in the Ottoman archives in Istanbul, produced after the death of Solomon II in 1815. The document is a sultan's firman confirming a new vassal ruler in Imereti, but the name field is left blank, apparently due to the lack of a suitable candidate at that time. Another Ottoman document, from c. 1821, mentions Vakhtang as khan of Imereti. Khomeriki conjectures that the Ottomans, vying with Russia for influence in western Caucasus, recognized the exiled Imeretian prince as a legitimate ruler of his country.

During his exile, Vakhtang was in correspondence with anti-Russian opposition and sought allies in both Turkey and Iran. His brother Tariel (died 1840) appears to have been in the Ottoman military as a high-ranking officer. In his last years, Vakhtang attempted to negotiate with the Russian authorities his safe return to Imereti, but he died, in December 1850, in the small town of Pulathane (now Akçaabat, Turkey). His only daughter, Anastasia, lived in Georgia. His alleged descendants in Turkey, the Haydar-Beys, are poorly documented.
