= Prince Constantine of Imereti (1789–1844) =

Georgian prince (1789–1844)

Prince Constantine
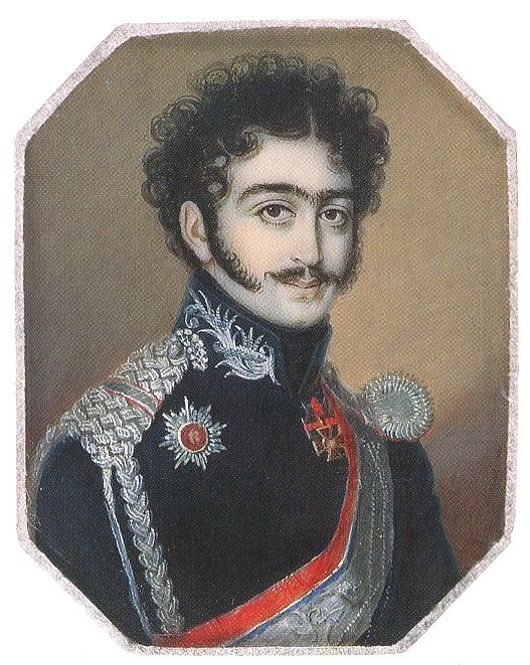
- Prince Constantine in military uniform, a painting from 1840s
- Born: 4 July 1789
- Died: 3 May 1844 (aged 54); Moscow, Russian Empire
- Burial: Donskoy Monastery
- Spouse: Anastasia Abashidze; Ana-Maria-Teresa Lopes da Silva; Ekaterina Strakhova
- Issue: Princess Nino; Prince David; Prince George; Prince Constantine; Prince Nicholas; Prince Alexander
- Dynasty: Bagrationi
- Father: David II of Imereti
- Mother: Ana Orbeliani
- Religion: Georgian Orthodox Church

Constantine (Georgian: კონსტანტინე, romanized: k'onst'ant'ine; Russian: Константин Давидович Имеретинский, Konstantin Davidovich Imeretinsky; 4 July 1789 – 3 May 1844) was a Georgian royal prince (batonishvili), belonging to the Imereti branch of the Bagrationi dynasty. A son of King David II of Imereti, Constantine was recognized as heir apparent by Solomon II, who had supplanted his father. Constantine's succession to the throne of Imereti was precluded by the Russian annexation of that country in 1810. Constantine subsequently entered the Russian Imperial military service, where he rose to the rank of Major-General.

== Early life and captivity ==
Prince Constantine was a son of King David II of Imereti and Princess Ana Orbeliani. At the age of three, he was surrendered by his father as a hostage to Solomon II, who had won a power struggle and dethroned David in 1791. When David attempted to reclaim the throne in 1792, Solomon had Constantine incarcerated in the castle of Mukhuri. When David II died in exile in the Ottoman pashalik of Akhaltsikhe in 1795, Constantine found himself in a conflicting situation; he became the only heir to the throne, as the nearest legitimate blood-relative of his childless captor, Solomon II.

In March 1802, David's widow Queen Ana, being harassed by Solomon, escaped from Imereti and applied to Emperor Alexander I of Russia to secure the release of his son. The Russian diplomat Aleksandr Sokolov (ru) arrived in Imereti for negotiations, but Solomon was adamant as he was fearful that the Russians would uphold the more amenable Constantine's claim to the throne. After long threats and bribery from the Russian commander in the Caucasus, Pavel Tsitsianov, Solomon agreed to release Constantine on the condition that he did not long reside in Tbilisi, the capital of Russia's Georgian possessions, and leave for Russia proper as soon as possible. Queen Ana also agreed to this compromise and Constantine was escorted to Tbilisi on 30 May 1803. In April 1804, Solomon was forced to accept the Russian suzerainty in the Convention of Elaznauri and, in one of its provisions, recognized Constantine as his heir apparent.

== Escape and revolt ==
Prince Constantine resided at Tbilisi under the Russian supervision until June 1804 when, anxious that the Russian authorities considered resettling him in Russia proper, he took advantage of Tsitsianov's departure for the Erivan campaign and escaped to Imereti. There he took shelter at the estate of his brother-in-law, Prince Davit Agiashvili. Solomon reconciled with Constantine and granted him several castles and villages such as Chkhari and Tsirkvali for his princely estate (sabatonishvilo). A group of Russian soldiers sent after him failed to overtake him; neither threats nor persuasion could force Constantine to return to Tbilisi. Solomon, likewise, repeatedly turned down requests from the Russian government to surrender him.

As Solomon's relations with Russia progressively deteriorated, Tsar Alexander ordered that Solomon be deposed and, together with his heir Constantine, deported from Imereti. In February 1810, the Russian army moved on to conquer Imereti. Constantine was with Solomon, encouraging him to resist until the king finally decided to capitulate in March 1810. In April 1810, Constantine also surrendered and, unable to obtain a permission to live as a private person in his estate, was ordered to move to Russia. On 31 July, he left Tbilisi for Saint Petersburg.

== Life in Russia ==
In 1812, by the Tsar's decree, Prince Constantine was enlisted in the Life Guard Cossack Regiment as a Rittmeister and promoted to being a Flügeladjutant to Tsar Alexander I. He was transferred to the Life Guard Hussar Regiment in 1813. He took part in the war against Napoleonic France from 1812 to 1814. In 1817, Constantine became major-general and appointed as a commander of the 1st Brigade of the 1st Hussar Division. He was awarded the Russian orders of St. Vladimir, 4th Class, St. Anna, 1st Class, and of St. George, 4th Class. Prince Constantine retired from the military service in 1838. He died in Moscow in 1844 and was buried at the Donskoy Monastery.

== Family ==
Constantine was married three times. His first marriage was to Anastasia (19 August 1796 – 15 September 1821), daughter of Prince George Abashidze. They had three children:

- Princess Nino (1807–1847), who married Ivane Andronikashvili;
- Prince David;
- Prince George (29 April 1809 – 1 September 1819).

His second marriage was to Ana-Maria-Teresa, daughter of Denis Lopes da Silva, on 9 September 1822. They had two sons:

- Prince Constantine (Konstantin) (15 June 1827 – 27 December 1885);
- Prince Nicholas (12 December 1830 – 24 October 1894).

His third marriage was to Ekaterina (died 22 October 1875), daughter of Sergei Strakhova. They had one son:

- Prince Alexander (1837–1900), a prominent general of the Imperial Russian Army who served as Governor-General of Warsaw.

Constantine was allowed to retain the title of tsarevich ("prince royal"), his children were equated to the Russian princely nobility (knyaz) in 1812. They and their descendants bore the title and surname of Princes and Princesses Imeretinsky (იმერეტინსკი, Имеретинский), with the qualification of "Serene Highness" (Светлейший князь) added to their style as ruled by the State Council of the Russian Empire on 20 June 1865. This line had become extinct in male line by 1978.
