= Dzirijumati =

Dzirijumati ძირიჯუმათი
- Village
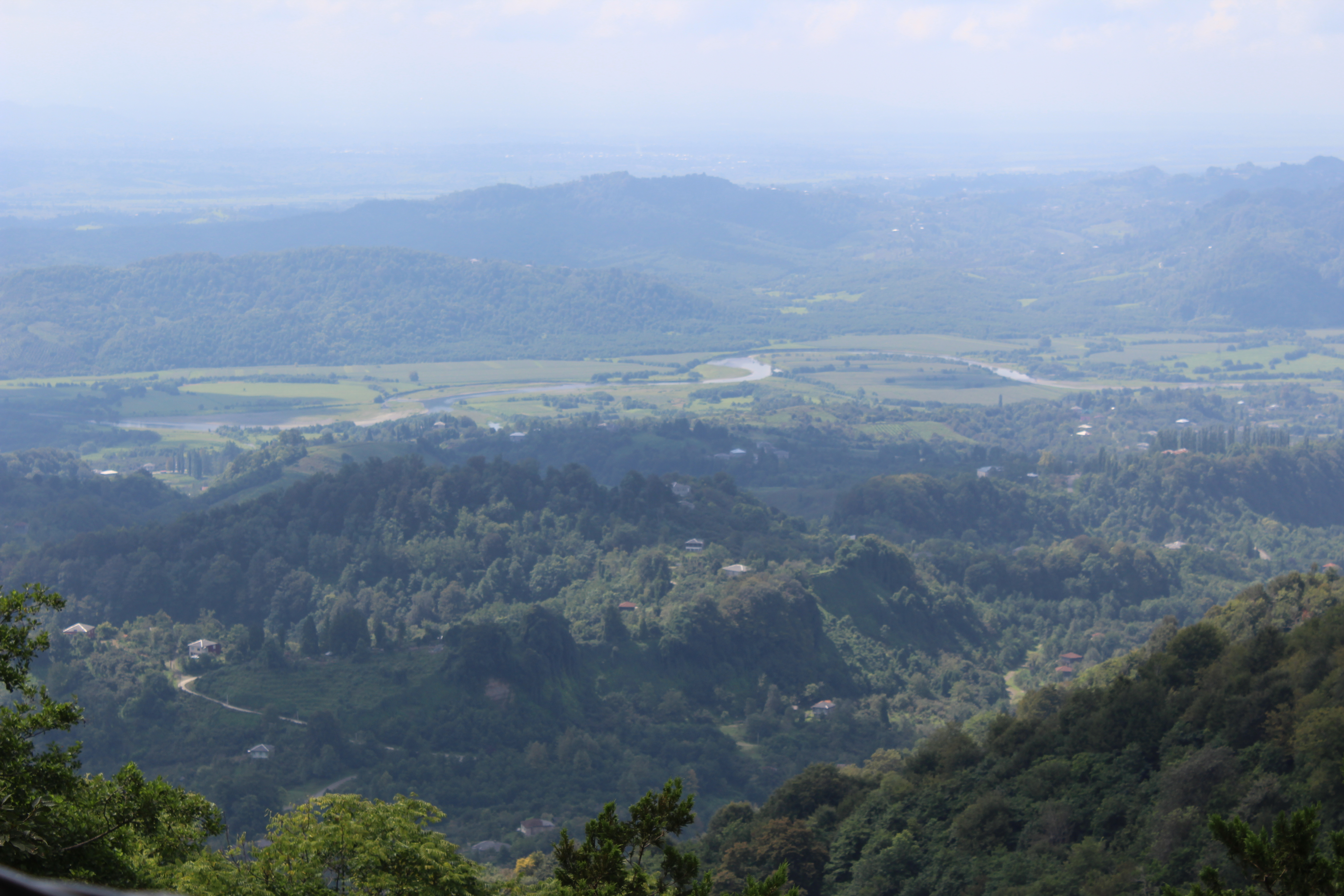

- Location within Georgia Location within Guria
- Coordinates: 42°01′08″N 41°58′50″E
- Country: Georgia
- Mkhare: Guria
- Municipality: Ozurgeti
- Elevation: 100 m (330 ft)

Population (2014)
  - Total: 189
- Time zone: UTC+4 (Georgian Time)

Dzirijumati (Georgian: ძირიჯუმათი) is a village in the Ozurgeti Municipality of Guria in western Georgia. Within the village is the Jumati monastery.
