= Mamuka of Imereti =

King of Imereti

Mamuka

King of Imereti
- Reign: 1746–1749
- Predecessor: Alexander V
- Successor: Alexander V
- Born: Before 1715
- Died: After 1769
- Spouse: Darejan Dadiani (m. 1732)
- Issue: Teimuraz of Imereti; Prince George
- Dynasty: Bagrationi
- Father: George VI of Imereti
- Mother: Rodam of Kartli
- Religion: Georgian Orthodox Church (Catholicate of Abkhazia)

Mamuka (Georgian: მამუკა; fl. 1715–1769) was a member of the Bagrationi dynasty of Imereti, a kingdom in western Georgia. He was installed as a rival king to his elder brother, Alexander V of Imereti from 1746 until being deposed in 1749.

== Biography ==
Mamuka was a son of George VI of Imereti by his first wife, Rodam, daughter of King George XI of Kartli. He twice tried to seize the crown of Imereti from his brother, Alexander V. In December 1732, Otia Dadiani, Prince of Mingrelia and Mamuka's brother-in-law, in alliance with the Imeretian noblemen, Zurab Abashidze and Grigol, Duke of Racha, attempted to bring down Alexander in favor of Mamuka. They blockaded the Imeretian capital Kutaisi, but did not dare to attack the citadel for fear of reaction from the Ottoman Empire and withdrew. They soon returned to the offensive and again marched against the king. Alexander, supported by Mamia IV Gurieli, won a victory at the battle of Chikhori, capturing Dadiani, but under the Ottoman pressure, the king had to restore him to Mingrelia and concede the districts of Sachilao and Samikelao in governorship to his alienated brother Mamuka. Later, Mamuka was able to dispossess the Chijavadze family of the Sebeka fortress and other estates.

In 1741, Mamuka followed Alexander in his exile to Kartli, when the throne of Imereti was seized by their younger half-brother George VII in an Ottoman-sponsored coup. Mamuka soon fled the turmoil in Kartli back to Imereti and Alexander was also able to resume his reign the same year. In 1746, his nobles were again in revolt and put Mamuka on the throne of Imereti. In 1749, with the help of the Ottoman pasha of Childir, Alexander recovered the throne. He died in 1752, leaving his throne to his 17-year-old son Solomon I.

Mamuka was member of the party opposed to his nephew's accession. After Solomon was able to secure the throne, Mamuka fled to Akhaltsikhe and was inveigled by its pasha as his agent. They continued to stir unrest in Imereti, but Solomon decisively defeated the Ottomans and their Imeretian allies at the battle of Khresili in 1757. In 1766, they finally succeeded to put Mamuka's son Teimuraz on the throne of Imereti, but Solomon staged a comeback in 1768. Teimuraz, together with his brother, was imprisoned and never seen again.

== Family ==
Mamuka married in 1732 Darejan Dadiani, daughter of Bezhan Dadiani, Prince of Mingrelia. He had two sons:

- Teimuraz of Imereti, King of Imereti (r. 1766–1768);
- Prince George (fl. 1768).

== Notes ==
Preceded by Alexander V	King of Imereti; 1746–1749	Succeeded by Alexander V
