= Lortkipanidze (surname) =

Lortkipanidze or Lordkipanidze (Georgian: ლორთქიფანიძე) is a Georgian surname associated with the noble family Lortkipanidze. Notable persons with that name include:

- Alexandre Lordkipanidze (born 1988), Georgian poet, playwright and novelist
- Archil Lortkipanidze (born 1970), Georgian fencer
- David Lordkipanidze (born 1964), Georgian anthropologist and archaeologist
- Gocha Lordkipanidze (born 1964, Georgian lawyer and ICC judge
- Grigol Lordkipanidze (1881–1937), Georgian politician and author
- Konstantine Lortkipanidze (1905–1986), Georgian translator, writer and screenwriter.
- Mariam Lortkipanidze (1922–2018), Soviet and Georgian historian
- Otar Lordkipanidze (1930–2002), Georgian archaeologist
- Vazha Lortkipanidze (born 1949), Georgian politician
