= Prince Archil of Imereti =

- Died: 6 October 1775
- Spouse: Princess Helen of Georgia (m. 1772)
- Issue: Princess Barbare; Solomon II of Imereti; Princess Mariam; Prince Mamuka (ill.)
- Father: Alexander V of Imereti
- Mother: Tamar Abashidze
- Religion: Georgian Orthodox Church (Catholicate of Abkhazia)

Archil (Georgian: არჩილი, romanized: archili; died 6 October 1775) was a Georgian royal prince (batonishvili) of the Bagrationi dynasty of Imereti.

== Biography ==
Prince Archil was a younger son of King Alexander V of Imereti by his wife, Tamar Abashidze and a brother of King Solomon I of Imereti. From 1769 to 1770, he commanded an Imeretian force against the Mingrelians around Khoni and, in July 1775, raided Atskuri in the Pashalik of Akhaltsikhe. Archil died at Kaskhi in 1775.

== Family ==
In 1772 Archil married Princess Helen of Georgia, a daughter of King Heraclius II of Georgia. The marriage was political, forced upon Helen, who was in love with Prince Zakaria Andronikashvili. Archil and Helen had three children.

- Princess Barbare (1771–1815), who was married to Prince David Tsulukidze;
- Solomon II of Imereti (born David) (1772–1815), the last King of Imereti (r. 1789–1810);
- Princess Mariam (1775–1854). She married, first, in 1795, Prince Melkisedek (Malkhaz) Andronikashvili (1773–1822) and had a son, Ivane, the future general in the Russian service. Mariam's second husband was Prince Leon Aleksandrovich Dadiani (1774–1847); they had no children.

Archil also had an illegitimate son:

- Prince Mamuka (fl. 1796–1840). He took part in an Imeretian revolt against the Russian rule in 1819 and then fled to Turkey. His children were: Mariam (born 1805), Alexander (fl. 1835), Archil (fl. 1815–1851), and Tekle (born 1817).
