= Strahov (disambiguation) =

Strahov is a district of Prague, Czech Republic.

Strahov may also refer to other places in the Czech Republic:

- Strahov Monastery in Prague
- Strahov Stadium in Prague
- Strahov, a village and part of Horní Kozolupy in the Plzeň Region

== See also ==
- Strakhov, a surname
