= Strakhov =

Strakhov (Russian: Страхов, from страх meaning fear) is a Russian masculine surname, its feminine counterpart is Strakhova. It may refer to

- Alexei Strakhov (born 1975), Ukrainian ice hockey player
- Daniil Strakhov (born 1976), Russian actor
- Gennady Strakhov (1944–2020), Russian wrestler
- Irina Strakhova (born 1959), Russian race walker
- Nikolai Mikhailovich Strakhov (1900–1978), Soviet geologist
- Nikolay Strakhov (1828–1896), Russian philosopher, publicist and literary critic
- Roman Strakhov (born 1995), Russian football midfielder
- Valeriya Strakhova (born 1995), Ukrainian tennis player
- Vyacheslav Strakhov (born 1950), Russian diver

== See also ==
- Strahov (disambiguation)
