= Ivane Abashidze =

Georgian aristocrat and rebel

- Native name: Georgian: ივანე აბაშიძე
- Died: December 12, 1822; Ottoman Empire
- Noble family: Abashidze
- Spouse: Princess Elisabed of Guria
- Father: Prince Kaikhosro Abashidze
- Mother: Princess Darejan of Imereti

Ivane Abashidze (Georgian: ივანე აბაშიძე; died 12 December 1822) was a Georgian nobleman of the Abashidze family and a claimant to the throne of Imereti during the revolt against the Russian rule in 1820. He was murdered in exile in the Ottoman Empire.

== Family background ==
Ivane Abashidze came from one of the leading noble Georgian families, which had once attained, in the person of Giorgi–Malakia Abashidze, to the crown of the western Georgian kingdom of Imereti from 1702 to 1707. His father was Prince Kaikhosro Abashidze (died 1810) and his mother was Princess Darejan (1756–1827), a daughter of King Solomon I of Imereti, whom Kaikhosro wed in 1768.

== Political career ==
Ivane Abashidze's involvement in politics was associated with the anti-Russian revolt in Imereti from 1819 to 1820. Imereti had been absorbed by Russia in 1810 and the former kingdom had been in a renewed rebellion by 1819. In 1820, Ivane—hitherto a "loyal" Russian subject—was nominated, by virtue of being Solomon I's grandson, as a king of Imereti by one of the rebel noble parties, dominated by the Abashidze clan. Overwhelmed by the Russian troops, Abashidze fled to Kaikhosro Gurieli, an uncle of his wife, in the Principality of Guria, whose many nobles also joined the Imeretian rebellion. The Russian colonel Puzirevsky, sent in Guria to enforce the surrender of the fugitive pretender, was killed. Abashidze and the Gurians then carried operations into Imereti and finally entrenched themselves in the Khani gorge. In July 1820, the Russians under General Velyaminov occupied the gorge and then overran Guria. Ivane Abashidze's family were rounded up, but he escaped capture by the Russians and fled to the Ottoman territory. His mother, Darejan, was arrested and deported to Russia. She would outlive her son and die in Moscow in 1827. In the meantime, the loyal prince-regnant of Guria, Mamia V Gurieli, successfully negotiated the return of Ivane's Gurian wife and his children from the road to their exile in Russia.

Ivane Abashidze was murdered near the Ottoman-controlled town of Akhaltsikhe, in 1822, allegedly at the instigation of Prince Vakhtang, a scion of the Imeretian royals, also an anti-Russian rebel and pretender to the throne of Imereti.

== Marriage and descendants ==
Ivane Abashidze was married to Princess Elisabed, a daughter of Simon III Gurieli, Prince of Guria. They had two sons, Kaikhosro and Giorgi, and a daughter, Ekaterine. Ekaterine eventually married Prince Rostom Tsereteli and became the mother of the popular Georgian writer Akaki Tsereteli.
