= Simon III Gurieli =

Georgian nobleman

Prince of Guria
- Reign: 1788–1792
- Predecessor: George V Gurieli
- Successor: Vakhtang III Gurieli
- Died: 1792
- Spouse: Marine Tsereteli
- Issue: Kesaria; Elisabed; Mamia V Gurieli; Unnamed daughter
- House: Gurieli
- Father: George V Gurieli
- Mother: Mariam Bagrationi
- Religion: Georgian Orthodox Church (Catholicate of Abkhazia)

Simon III Gurieli (also Svimon; Georgian: სიმონ [სვიმონ] III გურიელი, died 1792), of the western Georgian House of Gurieli, was Prince of Guria from 1788/89 to 1792.

== Biography ==
Simon Gurieli was the eldest son of George V Gurieli, Prince of Guria, who abdicated in Simon's favor due to his old age and political instability in the principality. Shortly after he acceded to the princely throne, Simon repaired to the Ottoman provincial capital of Akhaltsikhe for negotiations with the local pasha Isaq to ease Turkish pressure on Guria. On his way back, Simon's entourage was ambushed by the Muslim Georgian clansmen of Adjara, and the prince was taken captive by the Adjarian chieftain Selim Bey Khimshiashvili, who released Simon after the latter agreed to marry off his 5-year-old daughter Kesaria to Selim's son Abdi Bey.

In a civil war in the neighboring Kingdom of Imereti, whose monarchs claimed suzerainty over Guria, Simon supported David II, but he then made common cause with the eventual winner Solomon II. In 1790, the king of Imereti as well as princes-regnant of Guria and Mingrelia signed a treaty of alliance with Heraclius II, ruler of the eastern Georgian kingdom of Kartli-Kakheti, in which Heraclius was recognized as chief and doyen of the Georgian potentates. When Simon died in 1792, his younger brother Vakhtang took advantage of Simon's heir Mamia who was still underage, and seized the government of Guria.

== Family ==
Simon was married to Princess Marine (died 4 March 1814), daughter of the influential Imeretian nobleman, Prince Kaikhosro Tsereteli. He had three daughters and one son:

- Princess Kesaria (1785–1861), who married the Muslim Georgian nobleman Abdi-Bey Khimshiashvili (died 1859), son of Selim Khimshiashvili;
- Princess Elisabed (also known as Lisa; born 1786), who married Prince Ivane Abashidze;
- Mamia V Gurieli (1789–1826), Prince of Guria (r. 1797–1809);
- A daughter, who married Tariel Dadiani, Prince of Mingrelia.

Simon III Gurieli House of Gurieli
Regnal titles
| Preceded by George V Gurieli | Prince of Guria; 1788–1792 | Succeeded by Vakhtang III Gurieli |
