= Tsulukidze =

Tsulukidze (Georgian: წულუკიძე) is a Georgian surname.

People with the surname Tsulukidze include:

- the Tsulukidze family, a noble family in Georgia
  - Alexander Tsulukidze, revolutionary
  - Giorgi Tsulukidze, general
  - Varden Tsulukidze, military commander
