= Jumati Monastery =

- ჯუმათის მონასტერი
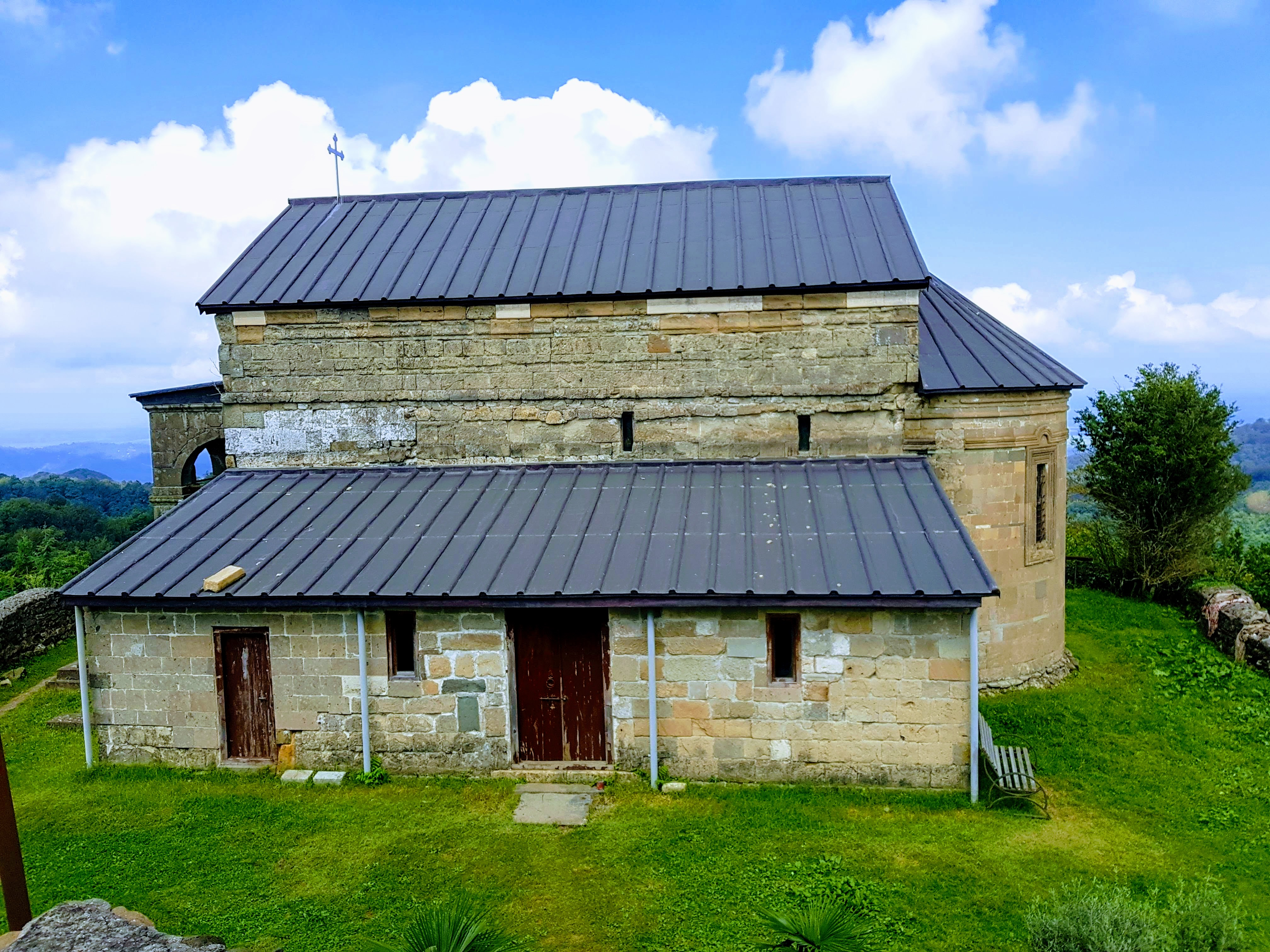

- Location within Guria Location within Georgia

Religion
- Affiliation: Georgian Orthodox Church

Location
- Location: Ozurgeti Municipality, Guria, Georgia
- Coordinates: 42°00′49″N 41°58′02″E

The Jumati Monastery (Georgian: ჯუმათის მონასტერი, romanized: jumatis monast'eri) is a Georgian Orthodox medieval monastery, in the Guria region, Ozurgeti, Georgia. It is located at the village of Dzirijumati, in the Supsa valley, 14 kilometers from the city of Ozurgeti. It currently belongs to the diocese of Shemokmedi.

== History ==
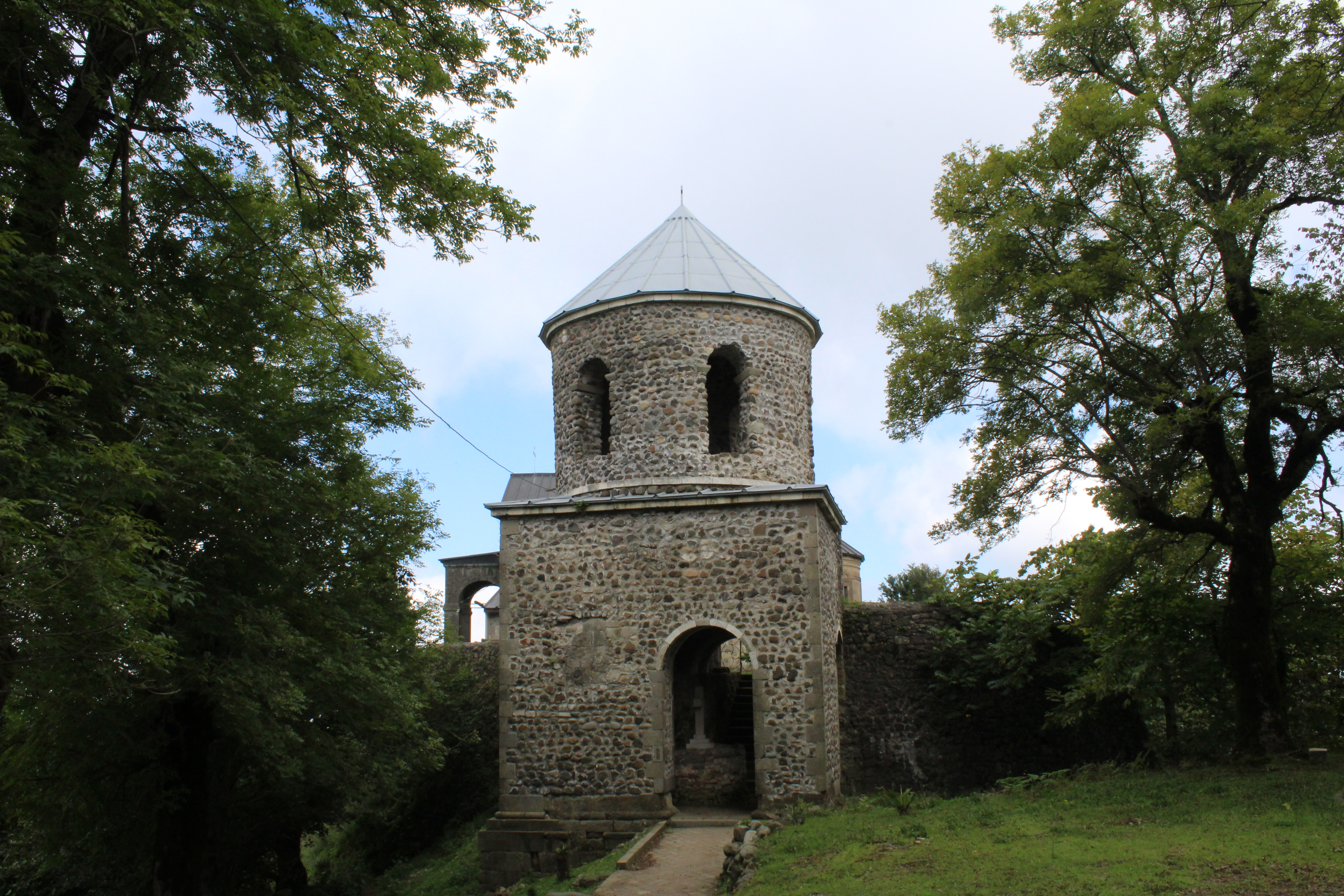
Jumati Monastery bell tower

The monastery consists of a church dedicated to the Archangels Michael and Gabriel, a bell tower, a wall, and other monastic buildings. Its period of construction is unknown. Georgian scientist Dimitri Bakradse believes that the monastery was founded and built before the Shemokmedi Monastery. The fresco painting dates from the XVI-XVIII centuries. In 1847, the church was renovated and in 1904, the bell tower was built. It has a square layout, six windows and was built in stone. It is partially destroyed.

Jumati Monastery was not only a religious center, but also an important cultural center of the Guria region. It was known for several relics preserved there, such as particularly valuable icons and historical documents. These relics and documents often had a secular meaning. By 1924, almost none of the relics were in Jumati. Particularly important was a golden icon of Saint George, from the 11th-12th century and which was lost in 1921 during a robbery. There are only two fragments preserved in the Hermitage Museum currently.

== Literature ==
- Dimitri Bakradse: Archaeological trip in Gurien and Adschara Batumi 1987 (დიმიტრი ბაქრაძე, არქეოლოგიური მოგზაურობა გურიასა და, ბათუმი, 1987)
