= Giorgi Tsulukidze =

Prince Giorgi Tsulukidze (Georgian: გიორგი წულუკიძე, Russian: Георгий Давидович Цулукидзе) (April 23, 1860 – May 19, 1923) was a Georgian military officer and anti-Soviet resistance leader.

Born of a noble family, Tsulukidze was educated at Elisavetgrad military pro-gymnasium and Tiflis infantry junkers' school. From 1876, he served in the Imperial Russian army. During World War I, he was promoted to the rank of major-general in 1915 and commanded a brigade in the 5th rifle division, then, in the years 1916–1917, the 174th Infantry Division and finally the 67th Infantry Division. On January 7, 1916, Giorgi Tsulukidze was awarded the Order of St. George (Fourth Degree). He then served in the military of a newly independent Democratic Republic of Georgia after whose fall to the Soviets (1921) he was involved in an underground independence movement. Tsulukidze was arrested by Cheka along with his associates and shot at the outskirts of Tbilisi on May 19, 1923.
