= Nikolai Mikhailovich Strakhov =

Soviet geologist

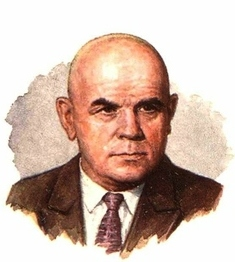
- Born: April 15, 1900; Bolkhov
- Died: July 13, 1978 (aged 78)

Nikolai Mikhailovich Strakhov (Николай Михайлович Страхов; 15 April 1900 – 13 July 1978) was a Soviet geologist who specialized in lithology and lithogenesis of ocean sediment. His book Principles of Lithogenesis (translated into English, 1967) was a landmark text. He also founded the journal Lithology and Mineral Resources.

Strakhov was born in Bolkhov, Orel, to school teacher Mikhail Vasilievich and Alexandra Denisovna. He worked as a teacher in Orel and Selsk for the Red Army during the revolution and from 1919 he taught at a school in Bolkhov. After the death of his mother in 1920, he left Bolkhov and joined Moscow University in 1923 and studied geology. He was particularly influenced by the teachings of A.D. Arkhangelskii. He taught geology for about seven years and wrote a book on historic geology and its problems in 1932 which went into further editions. Along with Arkhangelskii he conducted research and wrote on the geology of the Black Sea, a subject he also researched for his MSc in 1928. He joined the Geological Institute of the USSR Academy of Sciences in 1934. A hip injury reduced his mobility from 1937 and this forced him to work standing at a table from the 1950s. In the 1970s, antibiotic-caused neuritis of the auditory nerve led to near deafness and he only communicated by writing.

Strakhov received the Order of the Red Banner of Labor in 1945.

Strakhov married Alexandra Vasilievna Romachikova (d. 1959) and they had two sons. He then married N.A. Popova in 1962 but this was dissolved in 1964. He married Lidiya in 1972 but she died in 1975.
