= Kobaladze =

Kobaladze (in Georgian კობალაძე) is a Georgian surname. Notable people with the surname include:

- George Kobaladze (born 1976), Georgian-Canadian weightlifter
- Koba Kobaladze (born 1969), major-general of the Georgian army
