= Alexandre Lordkipanidze =

Georgian poet, playwright and novelist

- Lordkipanidze in 2020
- Born: October 12, 1988 (age 37); Tbilisi, Georgia
- Occupations: Poet, Playwright, Novelist
- Writing career
- Pen name: Alexandre Che
- Literary movement: Postmodernism, Poetry

Alexandre Lordkipanidze (Georgian: ალექსანდრე ლორთქიფანიძე) (born October 12, 1988) is a Georgian poet, playwright and novelist.

== Biography ==
Alexandre Lordkipanidze was born in 1988. In 2009, he graduated from Shota Rustaveli Theatre and Film University. In 2011, he received the Master’s Degree from the same university.

Lordkipanidze is one of the founders of poetry group Pink Bus. The group released their first and only poetry collection of the same name in 2007.

== Bibliography ==
In 2013, he published his first poetry collection, called Transparent. In 2014, Lordkipanidze wrote script for Georgian film Lost in Escapade.

In 2016, Lordkipanidze's play called 'The Island' was staged in Rustaveli Theatre in Tbilisi and in Ilia Chavchavadze State Drama Theatre in Batumi.

In 2017, Lordkipanidze wrote a children's book, named 'Lullaby for Lilly'.

In 2018, Lordkipanidze was nominated for Tsinandali Literature Award and won award in Poetry for 'The Reddish and Blackish'. In 2019, Lordkipanidze won Georgia's leading literary contest Saba for Play of the Year.

=== Poetry ===
- The Reddish and Blackish (მოწითალო და მოშავო) (2018)
- Transparent (გამჭვირვალე) (2013)
- Polly Pollack (პოლი პოლაკი) (2012)
- Blue (ლურჯი) (2010)

=== Short stories ===
- Lullaby for Lilly (იავნანა ლილისთვის) (2017)
- The 15 best Georgian stories (15 საუკეთესო ქართული მოთხრობა) (2014)
- Insomnia 2013 (ინსომნია 2013) (2013)
- The 15 best Georgian stories (15 საუკეთესო ქართული მოთხრობა) (2013)
- The 15 best Georgian stories (15 საუკეთესო ქართული მოთხრობა) (2012)

=== Plays ===
- The Island (კუნძული) (2016)

=== Collection of Plays ===
- Distoplays (დისტოპიესები) (2017)

=== Scripts ===
- Lost in Escapade (დაკარგულები) (2014)
- Host and screenwriter for TV Show "The Bookshelf (წიგნების თარო)" (2018–present)

== Literary Prizes and Awards ==
- Literary Award "Saba" for the Best Play of the Year "Distoplays" (2019)
- Literary Award "Tsinandali" for "The Reddish and Blackish" (2018)
- Rustaveli Theatre Award for "Play of the year" for "The Island" (2016)
- 24-Hour Theatre Festival Prizes for best play [for "Schrödinger's cat is dead" ("შრედინგერის კატა მკვდარია")] (2012)
- 24-Hour Theatre Festival Prizes for best play [for "My native Big-Mac" ("ჩემი მშობლიური ბიგ-მაკი")] (2011)
- Literary Award "Alubloba" for Best Sci-fi short story (2009)
