= Rodam of Kartli =

18th-century Queen of Imereti

Rodam (Georgian: როდამი; fl. 1703–1730) was a Georgian royal princess (batonishvili) of the Bagrationi dynasty and daughter of King George XI. She married King George VI of Imereti and served as queen of the Kingdom of Imereti twice, from 1707 to 1711 and again from 1712 to 1713.

== Biography ==
Rodam was the daughter of King George XI of Kartli and his second wife Khoreshan Mikeladze. She was named after her paternal grandmother, Rodam Qaplanishvili-Orbeliani. In 1703, while her father was appointed viceroy of Kandahar by Shah Soltan Hoseyn, Rodam was entrusted to the care of her maternal grandfather, the Imeretian prince George Mikeladze. In the same year, Mikeladze succeeded in persuading the heir apparent of Imereti, Prince George, to take Rodam as his wife.

This marriage led to a difficult rise to power for the heir, who benefited from the financial support of Rodam’s cousin, King Vakhtang VI. The union provoked the anger of the powerful Abashidze family, whose patriarch, George Abashidze, had insisted on marrying one of his own daughters to Prince George. In response, George Abashidze blocked the coronation of the royal couple and went to war against George Mikeladze, who was forced into exile in Kartli. A civil war followed and lasted until 1707, when Prince George finally secured power and became George VII of Imereti, while Rodam became queen.

However, the reign of George VII remained violent. In 1711, he was overthrown by a noble revolt, and the royal couple took refuge in Kartli, where the diplomacy of King Vakhtang VI succeeded in restoring peace between the Abashidze family and the deposed king. The relationship between George VII and Rodam nevertheless deteriorated. The historian Donald Rayfield claims that the king “hated” his wife and became the lover of Tamar Abashidze, the daughter of his former enemy, George Abashidze.

While in exile, the king ordered the blinding of George Nizharadze, Tamar’s husband, and secretly married her in 1712. Between 1712 and 1713, George VII temporarily regained the Imeretian throne, while Rodam’s fate during this period remains unknown. In January 1714, King Jesse of Kartli offered to restore George VII to power in Kutaisi, on the condition that he swear on a cross to abandon Tamar Abashidze and reinstate Rodam as queen of Imereti. George accepted these terms, divorced the Abashidze princess, and returned to the throne for a third time.

He soon broke this promise, however, exiling Rodam and their son Alexander to the mountains of Svaneti, and divorcing her later the same year. During the civil war that followed George VII’s third accession, the princes Bezhan Dadiani and Zurab Abashidze devastated Svaneti in 1716, including the castle of Queen Rodam, after which she disappears from the historical record.

== Family ==
Princess Rodam married King George VI of Imereti and had 5 children:

- Alexander V of Imereti (1704 – March 1752), King of Imereti from 1720 until his death in 1752.
- Mamuka of Imereti (1719 – 1769), he twice tried to seize the crown of Imereti from his brother, Alexander V.
- Princess Tamar (fl. 1735), married Prince David Abashidze in 1735.
- Princess Tuta, who married Prince Papuna Chichua in 1738.

== Bibliography ==
- Rayfield, Donald (2012). Edge of Empires, a History of Georgia. London: Reaktion Books. ISBN 978-1-78023-070-2.
