= Alexander Apukhtin =

Russian statesman (1822–1903)

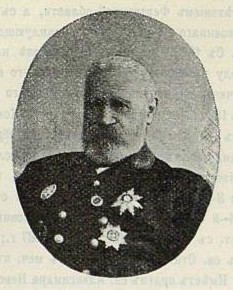
- Alexander Apukhtin

Superintendent of Congress Poland
- In office 1879–1897

Alexandr Lvovich Apukhtin (Russian: Алекса́ндр Льво́вич Апу́хтин; 4 November 1822 – 2 November 1903 in Saint Petersburg) was a Russian government official, and the superintendent of education in Congress Poland.

== Career ==
Following the January uprising in Congress Poland, a number of punitive actions were taken by the tsarist government as a measure to quell potential dissent. This included abolishing its autonomy, as well as the liquidation of Bank of Poland. The period was marked by vehement russification to which Apukthin considerably contributed by his alterations to the Polish educational system. His goal was to eradicate the Polish culture by substituting the Polish language with Russian. The reforms proved to be of pernicious nature, as illiteracy soared. In juxtaposition to Poles living in Galicia and Posen Province, Poles from Russia were least educated.
