= Imeretinsky =

Branch of Georgian royal family

- Parent house: Bagrationi dynasty
- Country: Georgia
- Final ruler: Solomon II of Imereti
- Titles: King of Imereti
- Deposition: 1810

Imeretinsky (Georgian: იმერეტინსკი; Russian: Имеретинский) is a title and later the name of the Georgian royal family branch of the Bagrationi dynasty that ruled the Kingdom of Imereti.

Solomon II of Imereti was the last Georgian king of Imereti before it was annexed by the Russian Empire in 1810. The name "Imeretinsky" (also spelled Imeretinski or Imeretinskii) derives from the Russian language, originally and literally meaning "of Imereti".

== Survival of dynasty after 1810 ==
- Princess Nino Bagration (1915-2008), former head of the House of Imereti and President of the Bagration Society. She supported the claims of Prince Nugzar Bagration-Gruzinsky to the erstwhile Georgian throne. (It is extinct in male line)
- Prince David Bagration (1948), another head of the House of Imereti. (Illegitimate line which continues in male line.)
