= Otia Dadiani =

Prince of Mingrelia

Prince of Mingrelia
- Reign: 1728—1757
- Predecessor: Bezhan Dadiani
- Successor: Katsia II Dadiani
- Died: 1757
- Spouse: Gulkan of Racha
- Issue: Katsia II Dadiani; Nikoloz; George; Anton; Mariam
- House: Dadiani-Chikovani
- Father: Bezhan Dadiani
- Mother: Tamar Gelovani
- Religion: Georgian Orthodox Church (Catholicate of Abkhazia)

Otia Dadiani (Georgian: ოტია დადიანი; died 1757), of the House of Dadiani, was Prince of Mingrelia from 1728 until his death. Like his predecessors, Otia Dadiani was embroiled in a series of civil wars that plagued western Georgia. He spent years fighting King Alexander V of Imereti with varying fortune. In the last years of his rule, Otia reconciled and corroborated with the Imeretian monarchy.

== Accession ==
Otia was the eldest son of Bezhan Dadiani, Prince of Mingrelia, by his wife, Princess Tamar Gelovani. In 1728, Otia accompanied Bezhan to a rendezvous with an Ottoman representative at Geguti in Imereti, where the Dadiani fell into a trap set up by the Imeretian nobleman Zurab Abashidze. Bezhan was killed by the Turkish dignitary's entourage, but Otia escaped and succeeded his father as Prince of Mingrelia, but not without a conflict with his younger brother Katso whom he had captured and sent for imprisonment in Racha, at the castle of Kvara.

Once in power, Otia defied an Ottoman request to join an expedition against the Abkhaz and Circassians, in which King Alexander V of Imereti, Otia's former brother-in-law, took part. Dadiani saw this campaign, which inevitably involved his possessions, as an attack against Mingrelia's interests. Alexander belatedly realized that his decision threatened his security and withdrew his troops from Abkhazia, but Otia began to plot revenge.

== Wars in Imereti ==
In December 1732, Otia made a common cause with the Abashidze family and Duke of Racha in an attempt to bring down Alexander in favor of the king's brother Mamuka. They blockaded the Imeretian capital Kutaisi, but did not dare to attack the citadel for fear of Ottoman reaction and withdrew. Their renewed offensive was dashed by the royal army at the battle of Chikhori at which Otia was wounded and made prisoner, and his brother Katsia was killed. Alexander tried reconciliation and, while helping the captive adversary to recover his health, offered him the governorship of Lechkhumi. However, the Ottomans, fearful of an emerging alliance, compelled Alexander to restore Otia to Mingrelia.

The conflict between the two rulers resumed as Prince Zurab Abashidze embroiled the duke of Racha and Otia Dadiani in another conspiracy. Forewarned, Alexander hired Lezgian tribesmen and ravaged his enemies's lands. Dadiani and Abashidze retaliated in 1740 and with the help of the Abkhaz mercenaries burned down the royal palace at Vartsikhe. Otia subsequently made peace with Alexander and maintained good relations with the king's successor, Solomon I of Imereti, who married Otia's daughter Mariam. In 1757, the seasoned prince Otia sent his son Katsia with a Mingrelian army to the aid of Solomon I, who won a decisive victory over the invading Ottoman troops and their local allies at the battle of Khresili.

== Family ==
Otia Dadiani was married to Princess Gulkan Chkheidze, daughter of Shoshita III, Duke of Racha (1696–1732). His children were:

- Katsia II Dadiani (died 1788), Prince of Mingrelia (r. 1758–1788);
- Nikoloz;
- George (died 15 December 1799), whose son was Didi-Niko Dadiani (1768–1834), sometime regent of Mingrelia, general, and historian;
- Anton (died 1815), a religious writer and bishop of Tsageri (1760–1777) and of Chqondidi (1777–1789);
- Mariam (died 1778), wife of King Solomon I of Imereti.

== Notes ==
Otia Dadiani House of Dadiani Born: ? Died: 1757
Regnal titles
| Preceded by Bezhan Dadiani | Prince of Mingrelia; 1728–1757 | Succeeded by Katsia II Dadiani |
