= Prince Simon of Imereti =

- Batonishvili
- Born: 1771
- Issue: Rostom Bagrationi
- House: Bagrationi of Imereti
- Father: Prince Bagrat of Imereti (1741–1800)
- Religion: Georgian Orthodox Church

Simon (Georgian: სიმონი; born 1771) was a Georgian royal prince (batonishvili) of the Bagrationi dynasty of Imereti.

Simon was a natural son of Prince Bagrat of Imereti and grandson of King Alexander V of Imereti. He had one son, Rostom, whose descendants, in contrast to the scions of the Imeretian royals, were not recognized in princely rank by the Russian Empire after its annexation of Imereti in 1810. Instead, they were reduced to the rank of untitled nobility (aznauri) with the surname of Bagrationi and are mentioned as such in the list of the Imeretian nobility confirmed by the tsar in 1850. As of 2015, they are the only surviving male-line descendants of the royal house of Imereti. Their familial village is Gvankiti, in Imereti.
