= Dmitry Bagration-Imeretinsky =

Georgian prince (1799–1845)

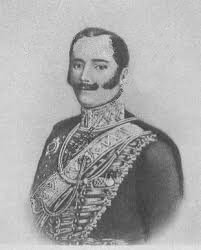
Dmitry Bagration-Imeretinsky

Prince Dmitry Bagration-Imeretinsky (Georgian: დიმიტრი გიორგის ძე ბაგრატიონ-იმერეტინსკი) (1799–1845) was a Georgian royal prince (batonishvili) of the royal Bagrationi dynasty of Imereti. He was born to Prince George of Imereti and Princess Darejan Eristavi of Racha (1779–1816).

Major General of Imperial Russian Army. A graduate of the Page Corps. Participant of Russo-Turkish War (1828–29) and November Uprising in 1830. He commanded the Uhlan and Hussar troops. Since 1833 commander of Courland Dragoons. Awarded with Order of St. Anna, Order of Saint Stanislaus, Order of the Red Eagle and Order of St. Vladimir.

In 1842 he married Olga Valerianovna Strzhemen-Stroinovskaya (1824–1853) and had 2 children:

- Aleksandr (1843–1880)
- Dmitry (1846–1885)

He died on 6 November 1845 in Saint Petersburg, Russia. He is buried in the Lazarevskoe Cemetery at the Alexander Nevsky Lavra on Lazarevskoe cemetery.
