= Tavdgiridze =

Georgian noble family

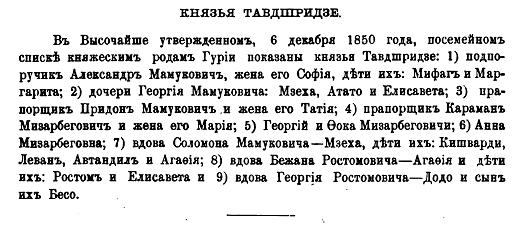
Princes Tavdgiridze in the Russian nobility book from 1892

The House of Tavdgiridze (Georgian: თავდგირიძე) is an old Georgian noble family, known since the 14th century. In 19th century it became also part of Russian nobility.

== History ==
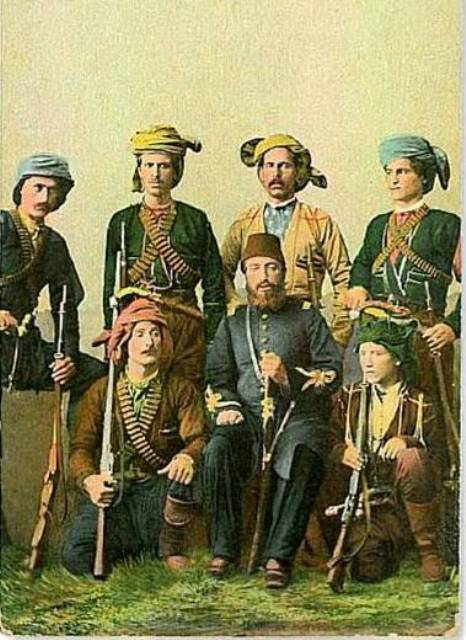
Çürüksulu Ali Pasha, A descendant of Tavdgiridze family, with Laz people

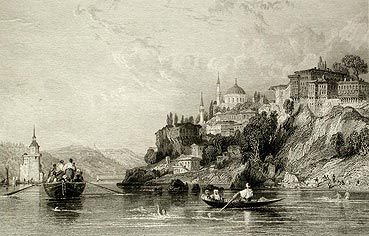
Çürüksulu palace, owned by the descendants of the Tavdgiridze family

They hailed from the southern provinces of Georgia which fell under the Ottoman rule in the 16th century. This forced many of the Tavdgiridze to relocate to relatively safer areas such as Kartli, Imereti, and Guria. In the latter province, in the 17th century, the family was bestowed by the local ruling prince George III Gurieli with an estate in Lower Guria and the hereditary office of Chief Bailiff (bok’auli). The Ottoman expansion into Lower Guria in the 1770s divided the Tavdgiridze family along religious lines. Mamuka Tavdgiridze and his household fled the Ottomans in the north of Guria. His Christian descendants received among the princely nobility of the Russian Empire in 1850. One of Mamuka's sons, Maxime, became Muslim, adopted the name of Süleyman and was conferred by the Ottoman government with the sanjak of Çürüksu (Kobuleti). His descendants remained loyal local rulers to the Ottoman Empire, fighting the Russians in the wars of 1853-6 and 1877-8. One of these, Hasan-Bey was killed in 1854, while Ali-Paşa and Osman-Paşa (“of Adjara”) had to resettle to Turkey as muhajirs in 1878. Hasan and Ali are satirized in local folk songs of Guria.
