= Alexander V of Imereti =

Alexander V

King of Imereti
- 1st Reign: 1720–1741
- Predecessor: George VI
- Successor: George VII
- 2nd Reign: 1741–1746
- Predecessor: George VII
- Successor: Mamuka
- 3rd reign: 1749–1752
- Predecessor: Mamuka
- Predecessor: Solomon I
- Born: 1704
- Died: March 1752 (aged 47–48)
- Spouse: Mariam Dadiani (m. 1721; died 1731) Tamar Abashidze (m. 1732)
- Issue: Princess Khoreshan; Prince Narin-David; Princess Rodam; Solomon I of Imereti; Catholicos Joseph; Prince Bagrat; Prince Archil; Prince George
- Dynasty: Bagrationi
- Father: George VI of Imereti
- Mother: Rodam of Kartli
- Religion: Georgian Orthodox Church (Catholicate of Abkhazia)
- Khelrtva

Alexander V (Georgian: ალექსანდრე V, romanized: aleksandre V; 1704 – March 1752), of the Bagrationi dynasty, was king (mepe) of Imereti (western Georgia) from 1720 his death in 1752, with the exceptions of the periods of 1741 and 1746–1749.

== Reign ==
The eldest son of George VI of Imereti and Rodam of Kartli, Alexander was brought up at the court of Vakhtang VI and enjoyed his support in the power struggle in Imereti. He visited Istanbul in the 1710s in order to seek Ottoman aid against the Gurieli usurpers of the crown of Imereti. In August 1719, he returned with a detachment of Turkish auxiliaries, deposed George IV Gurieli in June 1720, and was crowned king of Imereti. However, from 1721 to 1728, the government was effectively run by Bezhan Dadiani, Prince of Mingrelia. When Alexander assumed full ruling powers, Bezhan's son and successor Otia defied him and his pro-Turkish policy, and attempted to remove Alexander from the throne. Alexander managed to force him into submission in 1732 and brought, for the time being, a feudal anarchy to an end.

In the early 1730s, the king effectively withdrew his loyalty from the Ottomans, refused to accept the Persian suzerainty and attempted to make an alliance with the Russian Empire. In 1738, he sent Bishop Timothy Gabashvili to St. Petersburg with a plan of joint actions against the Ottomans. However, the 1739 Russo-Turkish Treaty of Belgrade rendered the mission abortive. Indignant at his diplomacy in Russia, the Ottomans sponsored a coup that deposed Alexander in favor of his brother George VII. The Persian ruler Nadir Shah quickly took Alexander's side and protested to the Ottoman government. In 1742, Alexander was restored, but faced a revolt, in 1746, by his brother Mamuka who ruled as a rival king in parts of Imereti until the fratricide war ended in Alexander's victory in 1749. Yet, the general instability and occasional outbreaks of aristocratic disobedience continued to trouble the rest of Alexander's reign.

== Family ==
In 1721, Alexander married firstly to Mariam (died 1731), daughter of Bezhan Dadiani, Prince of Mingrelia. They had one son and two daughters:

- Princess Khoreshan, who married Nikoloz (fl. 1722–1772), son of Prince Papuna Tsereteli;
- Prince Narin-David (fl. 1727–1749);
- Princess Rodam (died 1770), who married Mamia IV Gurieli, Prince of Guria.

On 23 December 1732, Alexander married secondly to Tamar (fl. 1732–1772), daughter of Prince Levan Abashidze. They had five sons:

- Solomon I of Imereti (1735–1784), King of Imereti (r. 1752–1784), who consolidated royal authority, successfully repelled Ottoman invasions, and famously banned the devastating regional slave trade;
- Prince Joseph (Jesse) (1739–1776), Catholicos of Abkhazia (1769–1776);
- Prince Bagrat (1741–1800), whose natural son was Prince Simon, whose descendants remained the only surviving male-line branch of the royal House of Imereti;
- Prince Archil (died 1775), father of Solomon II of Imereti, the last King of Imereti;
- Prince George (fl. 1748–1750).

Preceded by George IV Gurieli	King of Imereti; 1720–1741	Succeeded by George VII
Preceded by George VII	King of Imereti; 1741–1746	Succeeded by Mamuka
Preceded by Mamuka	King of Imereti; 1749–1752	Succeeded by Solomon I
