= Teimuraz of Imereti =

King of Imereti
- Reign: 1766–1768
- Predecessor: Solomon I
- Successor: Solomon I
- Spouse: Ana of Racha
- Dynasty: Bagrationi
- Father: Mamuka of Imereti
- Mother: Darejan Dadiani
- Religion: Georgian Orthodox Church (Catholicate of Abkhazia)

Teimuraz (Georgian: თეიმურაზი; died c. 1768), of the Bagrationi dynasty, was king (mepe) of Imereti (western Georgia) from 1766 to 1768.

== Biography ==
A son of Prince Mamuka, sometime claimant to the crown of Imereti, and his wife, Darejan Dadiani, daughter of Bezhan Dadiani, Prince of Mingrelia. Teimuraz was enthroned by the Ottoman government after the deposition of his cousin, King Solomon I. He ruled under the Turkish protection until Solomon regained the throne with the Russian support in 1768. Teimuraz was put in the Mukhuri prison and was never seen again.

Preceded by Solomon I	King of Imereti; 1766–1768	Succeeded by Solomon I
