= David II of Imereti =

King of Imereti (1784–1789)

David II
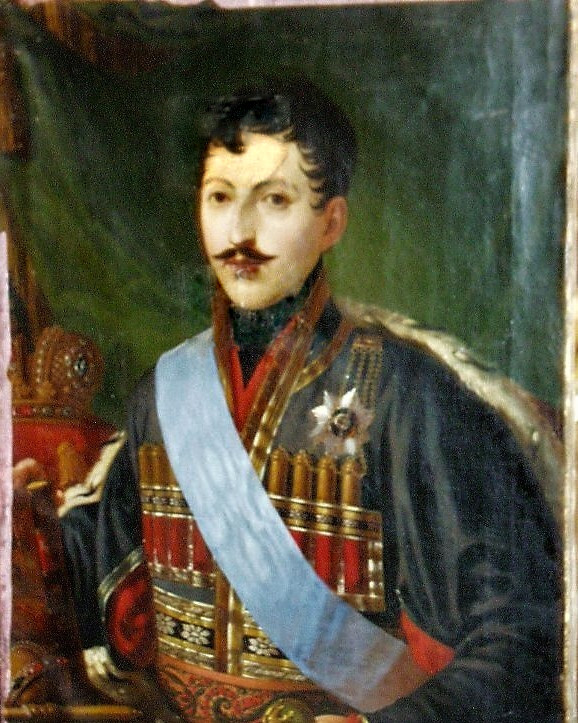
- Portrait of David II.

King of Imereti
- Reign: 1784—1789
- Predecessor: Solomon I
- Successor: Solomon II
- Born: 1755
- Died: 11 January 1795 (aged 39–40)
- Spouse: Ana Orbeliani
- Issue: Princess Tamar; Princess Mzekhatun; Princess Marta; Prince Constantine; Prince Rostom (ill.); Princess Anastasia (ill.)
- Dynasty: Bagrationi
- Father: George VII of Imereti
- Mother: Mzekhatun Lipartiani
- Religion: Georgian Orthodox Church (Catholicate of Abkhazia)

David II (Georgian: დავით II, romanized: davit II; 1755 – 11 January 1795), of the Bagrationi dynasty, was king (mepe) of Imereti (western Georgia) from 1784 to 1789.

== Biography ==
He was the son of George VII of Imereti, who had briefly ruled in 1741, and his wife, Princess Mzekhatun Lipartiani, daughter of Prince Giorgi Lipartiani. After the death of his cousin, King Solomon I, he became a regent but prevented the rival princes David (the future king Solomon II) and George from being crowned. With the support of Katsia II Dadiani, prince of Mingrelia, he seized the throne and proclaimed himself king on May 4, 1784. He attempted to establish a contact with Imperial Russia and to restrict the powers of great nobles. In 1787 David sent the poet Besiki ostensibly to negotiate with the Russians (Besiki was rumoured to be the lover of David's queen). Besiki lingered in Ukraine until 1789, forbidden to proceed to St Petersburg, and eventually dying in Iaşi. David's policy drew many leading aristocrats, including the Mingrelian prince Grigol Dadiani, into opposition. In 1789, King Heraclius II of Georgia sent his army into Imereti and helped David-Solomon to expel David II into Akhaltsikhe in the Ottoman-held Georgian province. In 1790, he returned with a Turkish force and deposed Solomon II, but was eventually defeated and fled Imereti. Later, through the mediation of Heraclius, David was allowed to return to Imereti and granted a fiefdom. Between 1792 and 1794, he attempted, with the Dagestan mercenaries, to reclaim the crown, but suffered a defeat and withdrew from Imereti. In January 1795, David died of smallpox while in exile at Akhaltsikhe.

== Family ==
David was married to Ana Orbeliani (1765–1832), daughter of Prince Mamuka Orbeliani. They were the parents of:

- Princess Tamar (1781 – 7 April 1840), who married Simon, son of Prince George Eristavi-Sharvashidze;
- Princess Mzekhatun (1783 – 2 February 1829), who married Simon (1773–1855), son of Prince Zurab Tsereteli;
- Princess Marta (born 1784);
- Prince Constantine (1789–1844), heir to the throne of Imereti, subsequently major-general of the Russian service.

David also had natural children:

- Prince Rostom (died 1820), whose son, Vakhtang, rose in revolt against the Russian rule in 1820.
- Princess Anastasia (died c. 1818), who married Prince David Agiashvili.

== Bibliography ==
=== English ===
- Rayfield, D. (2013) Edge of Empires: A History of Georgia, Reaktion Books, ISBN 9781780230702
- David Marshall Lang, The Last Years of the Georgian Monarchy, 1658-1832. New York: Columbia University Press, 1957.

=== Georgian ===
- საქართველოს მეფეები, მ. ლორთქიფანიძისა და რ. მეტრეველის რედაქცია, თბ., ნეკერი, 2000
- შ. ბურჯანაძე, იმერეთის სამეფოს საშინაო პოლიტიკა 1789–1802 წლებში, თბ., 1962
- შ. ბურჯანაძე, იმერეთის სამეფოს პოლიტიკური ისტორიისათვის 1784–1789 წლებში, ხელნაწერთა ინსტიტუტის მოამბე, ტ. II, თბ., 1960
- მ. რეხვიაშვილი, იმერეთის სამეფო 1462–1810 წწ., თბ., 1989
- ქ. ჩხატარაიშვილი, დასავლეთ საქართველო XVIII ს–ის პირველ ნახევარში, სინ, ტ. IV, თბ., 1973

ალ. ხახანაშვილი, მეფე იმერეთისა სოლომონ II, ტფ., 1910

- მ. სურგულაძე, ბაგრატიონთა სამეფო სახლი, გენეალოგიური ტაბულის შემდგენლები მ. სურგულაძე, მ. ქავთარია, თბ., 1975

Preceded by Solomon I	King of Imereti; 1784–1789	Succeeded by Solomon II
