= Eristavi of Guria =

Georgian noble

Coat of Arms of Guriis Eristavi (Eristavi of Guria)

The House of Guriis Eristavi (Georgian: გურიის ერისთავი) or Eristavi of Guria, was a Georgian noble family, a branch of the Shervashidze, dynasts in Abkhazia. Initially in the XV century, during the reign of House of Gurieli, the position was held by the noble family of Gugunava and in the XVI century – House of Kobaladze. Throughout the XVII century, the office was supervised by Tavadi Giorgi Sharvashidze, brother-in-law of Mamia III Gurieli. Giorgi and his posterity received the feudal domains with monasteries of Gomaghali and Erketi (where there ancestral crypt was located) and Satavado (county) lands of Sajavakho that before was belonged to House of Chiladze. Thus, their surname derives from the title of eristavi ("duke") and in the 18th century, the family bore the name Eristavi-Sharvashidze (ერისთავი-შერვაშიძე). On December 6, 1850, the family was received among the princely nobility of the Russian Empire as knyaz Eristov-Guriisky (Russian: Эристов-Гурийский).

The noble family of Maksimenishvili (მაქსიმენიშვილი) was a possible collateral branch of the Eristavi-Sharvashidze. They were also confirmed in the Russian title of knyaz in 1850.

== Sources ==
- S.V. Dumin, Noble Families of Russian Empire. Vol. 4, The Georgian Kingdom (Дворянские Роды Российской Империи. Том 4 Князья Царства Грузинского), 1998, p. 265.
