= Solomon II of Imereti =

King of Imereti (1789–1790, 1792–1810)

Solomon II
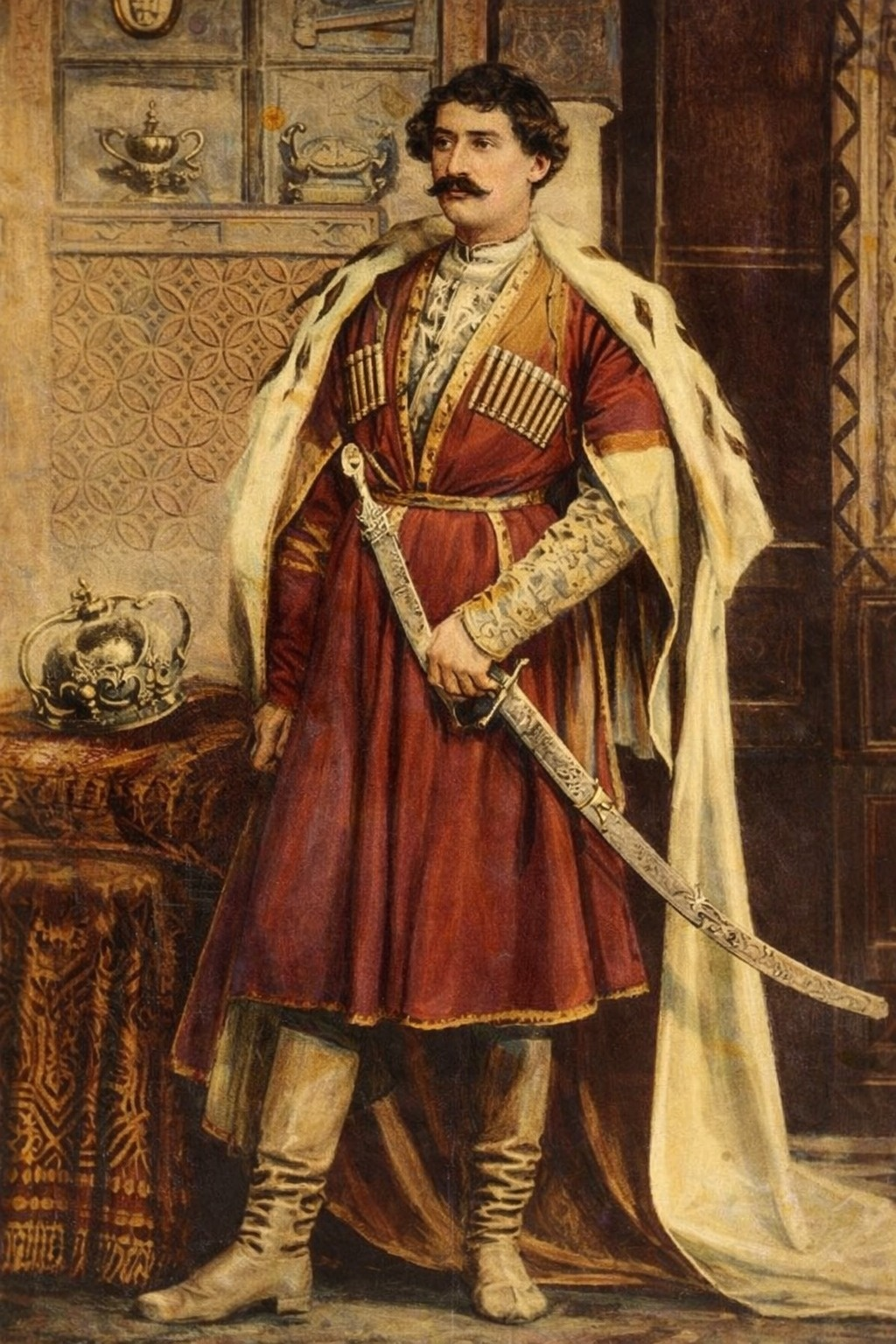
- Solomon II alongside the lost Georgian Crown Jewels

King of Imereti
- Reign: 1789–1810
- Predecessor: David II
- Heir apparent: Prince Constantine
- Born: 1772
- Died: 7 February 1815 (aged 42–43); Trabzon, Ottoman Empire
- Spouse: Mariam Dadiani (m. 1791)
- Dynasty: Bagrationi
- Father: Prince Archil of Imereti
- Mother: Princess Helen of Georgia
- Religion: Georgian Orthodox Church
- Khelrtva

Solomon II (born as David) (Georgian: სოლომონ II; 1772 – 7 February 1815) was a Georgian monarch of the Bagrationi dynasty, who reigned as the last king (mepe) of Imereti in western Georgia from 1789 until his deposition by the Imperial Russian government in 1810.

== Biography ==
=== Early years ===
He was born as David, to Prince Archil of Imereti, brother of King Solomon I of Imereti, by his wife Helen, daughter of King Heraclius II of Georgia. Solomon I, who died in 1784 without a male heir, named his nephew David as his successor. However, Solomon's uncle David II prevented him, and another rival prince, George, from being crowned as king and occupied the throne, leading to a civil war. Heraclius II interfered on behalf of his grandson and sent in an army, defeating David II at the Battle of Matkhoji on June 11, 1789. David, son of Archil, was crowned as King of Imereti under the name of Solomon II, but David II continued his efforts to resume the throne until his final defeat in 1792. He ruled under the protection of his maternal grandfather, Heraclius II, and continued Solomon I's policy of restricting the powers of feudal aristocracy. In 1795, he and Heraclius fought with a small Imeretian force at the Battle of Krtsanisi against the Persians, only to be completely defeated by the latter.

=== Conflict with Russia ===
After Heraclius' death in 1798, and the annexation of the eastern Georgian kingdom of Kartli-Kakheti (east of Imereti) by Russia in 1800, the situation in Imereti became precarious. His refractory vassals, princes of Mingrelia and Guria (west of Imereti), assumed the Russian protection and put forward territorial claims to the royal domains. Solomon attempted to enlist Ottoman and Persian support against the anticipated Russian encroachment. However, the Russian commander in Georgia, Prince Pavel Tsitsianov, moved his army into Imereti and forced Solomon to succumb to Russian vassalage in the convention of Elaznauri of April 25, 1804. Yet, Solomon's relations with Russia continued to be strained. On February 20, 1810, the Russian administration removed Solomon from the throne and sent in troops to take control of the kingdom. Solomon retaliated by rallying people against Russia and tried to enlist Turkey, Persia and Napoleonic France in his cause. In response, the Russian government deployed 3,200 troops divided into two units in Tbilisi to invade Imereti. Georgian insurgents once defeated one unit at the border. However, Lieutenant-General Rozen led the other unit with the support of defecting Georgian nobles and defeated Solomon, who had fortified himself in the Khanistsqali valley.

=== Later years ===
After Russia quelled the uprising, Solomon fled to the Ottoman possessions in Trebizond where he died in 1815 and was buried at the Saint Gregory of Nyssa Church. The body of Solomon II, the last reigning Georgian king, was moved from Trebizond to Gelati Monastery, Georgia, in 1990.

== Family ==
Solomon was married to Princess Mariam Dadiani (1783–1841), daughter of Katsia Dadiani, Prince of Mingrelia, with no children.

== Solomon II's attitude towards the church ==
The spiritual teacher of Solomon II was Hilarion (secular name Iesse Kanchaveli). Their close relationship and shared vision for the state led to many beneficial changes in the kingdom. In order to develop and strengthen religious and state thinking, the king reinforced the Church and promoted worthy individuals. King Solomon II rewarded the faithful princes of the country with estates, granted lands and tax privileges to the Church of Jerusalem in Imereti, and reissued the royal charter of the Bichvinta Cathedral. On July 27, 2005, the Georgian Orthodox Church canonized Solomon II as a saint in recognition of his religious merits and devotion to the homeland.

Preceded by David II	King of Imereti; 1789–1810	Russian annexation
