= Solomon I of Imereti =

King of Imereti

Solomon I
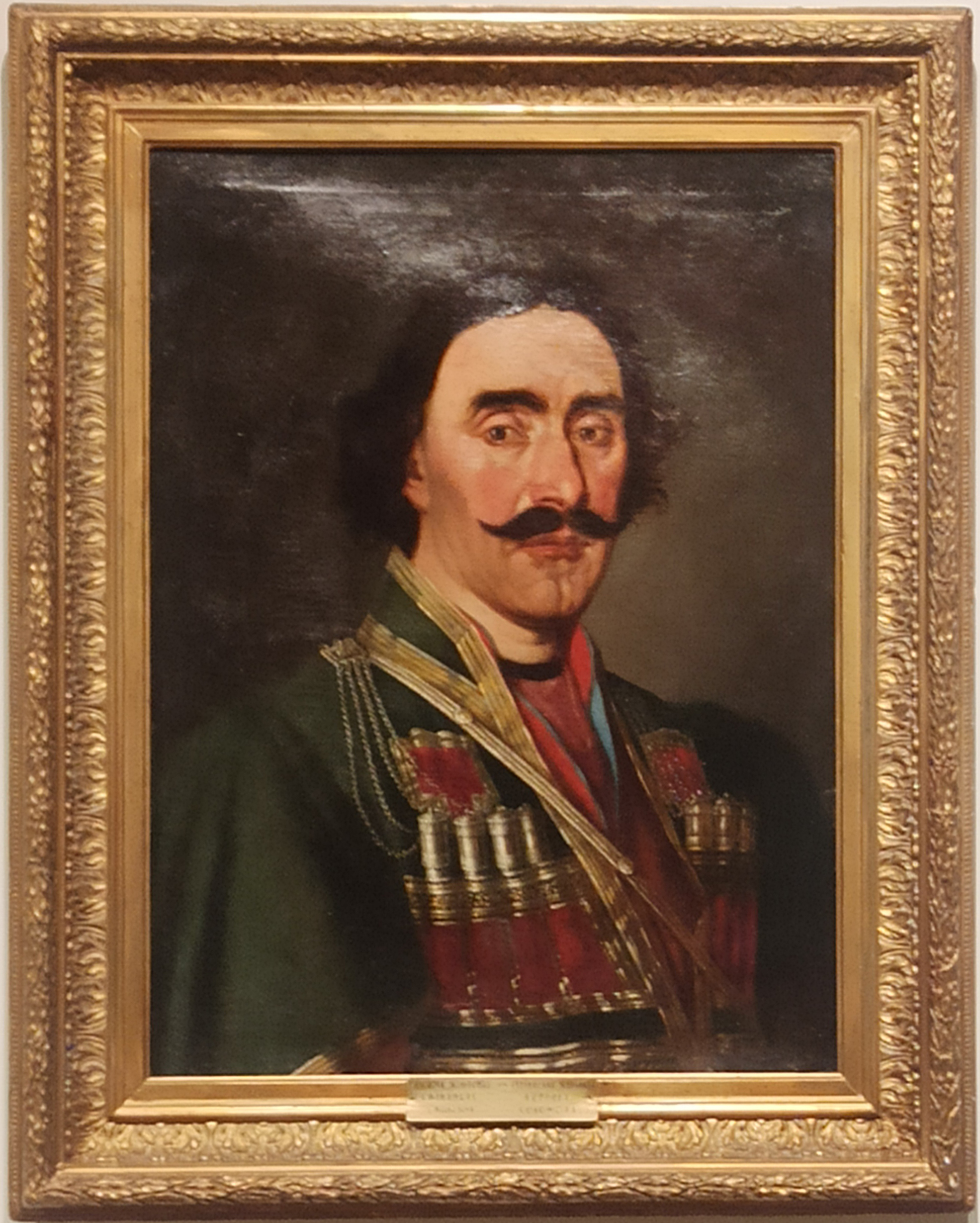
- Portrait of King Solomon I at the National Museum of Georgia.

King of Imereti
- 1st reign: 1752–1766
- Predecessor: Alexander V
- Successor: Teimuraz
- 2nd reign: 1768–1784
- Predecessor: Teimuraz
- Successor: David II
- Born: 1735
- Died: 23 April 1784 (aged 48–49)
- Spouse: Tinatin Sharvashidze; Mariam Dadiani; Gulkan Tsulukidze
- Issue: Prince David; Prince Bagrat (ill.); Princess Darejan; Princess Mariam; Prince Alexander
- Dynasty: Bagrationi
- Father: Alexander V of Imereti
- Mother: Tamar Abashidze
- Religion: Georgian Orthodox Church (Catholicate of Abkhazia)
- Khelrtva

Solomon I the Great (Georgian: სოლომონ I დიდი, romanized: solomon I didi; 1735 – 23 April 1784) was a Georgian monarch who reigned as king (mepe) of Imereti in western Georgia from 1752 to 1766 and again from 1768 until his death in 1784.

== Biography ==
Solomon was a son of Alexander V of Imereti by his second wife, Princess Tamar Abashidze and succeeded upon his father's death in 1752. He immediately launched a series of stringent measures against the renegade nobles and slave trade from which they profited in conjunction with the Ottoman authorities. In 1752, the aristocratic opposition staged a coup, but Solomon quickly regained the crown and began a program of reforms aimed at stabilizing the kingdom torn apart by chronic civil wars. The Ottomans, which saw Imereti as the sphere of their influence, sent in an army, but Solomon succeeded in mobilizing his nobles around him and defeated the invaders at the Battle of Khresili in 1757. The same year, he forged an alliance with his kinsman, Heraclius II, who ruled in eastern Georgia. He defeated two more Ottoman invasions (20,000 strong and 13,000 strong). The Ottoman instigated invasions of North Caucasian tribes, one of which succeeded, while a second one was thwarted. Briefly, Ottomans took Kutaisi in 1765 and placed his cousin, Teimuraz on the throne. In 1767, Solomon managed to stage a comeback, and freed Imereti of the Turks again. Next year, another Russo-Turkish war broke out, and in May 1769, Solomon traveled to Tbilisi to meet with Heraclius II. The two kings decided to request five Russian regiments and join the war with the Ottoman Empire in exchange of the guarantee that Georgian interests would be protected in the final Russo-Turkish peace deal. The Russians sent a small force under General Gottlieb Heinrich Totleben, but the general's rudeness and condescension alienated the Georgians; Totleben was quickly recalled from Georgia. A few of the battles Solomon was involved in was the 1769 siege of Şorapani and the 1770–1771 siege of Poti.

After the war was over, Solomon was able to force his autonomist vassals, princes of Mingrelia and Guria, into submission, and continued antagonizing the Ottoman hegemony in the region. The Ottomans had no choice but to sign a treaty with Imereti, by which Imereti was no longer an Ottoman vassal, the slave trade was not even mentioned, with a symbolic tribute of 60 women annually (did not stipulate them to be Georgians, and Solomon never honored this clause anyway).

He crushed the Ottoman-sponsored insurrection in Abkhazia in 1779, and made a series of forays into the Turkish-controlled southwestern historic Georgian lands. He died in March 1784 and was buried at the Gelati Monastery. He was canonized by the Georgian Orthodox Church on 22 December 2016, his feast day set for 23 April (NS 10 April).

== Family ==
Solomon I was married three times. His first wife was Tinatin Sharvashidze (fl. 1752); his second was Mariam (died 1778), daughter of Otia Dadiani, Prince of Mingrelia; and his third was Gulkan (1730–1800), daughter of Prince Beri Tsulukidze. His children were:

- Prince David, by Tinatin Sharvashidze;
- Prince Bagrat, an illegitimate son;
- Princess Darejan (1755–1827), by Mariam Dadiani, who married Prince Kaikhosro Abashidze (1737–1805). Their son, Prince Ivane Abashidze, was a pretender to the throne of Imereti in 1820;
- Princess Mariam (1759–1843), by Mariam Dadiani, who married Elizbar (1751–1826), son of George, Duke of Ksani;
- Prince Alexander (1760–1780), by Mariam Dadiani, who led a brief revolt against his father in 1778 before reconciling with him. He predeceased his father, leaving an illegitimate son, Prince George of Imereti (1778–1807), who later became a prominent pretender to the throne and an exile in the Russian Empire.

== Ancestry ==
Ancestors of Solomon I of Imereti

8. Alexander IV of Imereti
4. George VI of Imereti
9. A concubine
2. Alexander V of Imereti
5. Rodam of Kartli
1. Solomon I of Imereti
12. George V of Imereti
6. Levan Abashidze
3. Tamar Abashidze

Preceded by Alexander V	King of Imereti; 1752–1766	Succeeded by Teimuraz
Preceded by Teimuraz	King of Imereti; 1768–1784	Succeeded by David II
