= List of Georgian princes (mtavars) =

== Principalities ==
=== Princes and dukes of Guria ===
- Kakhaber I Gurieli (c. 1385–1410)
- Mamia Gurieli (c. 1450–1469)
- Kakhaber II Gurieli (1469–1483)
- George I Gurieli (1483–1512})
- Mamia I Gurieli (1512–1534)
- Rostom Gurieli (1534–1564)
- George II Gurieli (1564–1583)
- Vakhtang I Gurieli (1583–1587)
- George II Gurieli (1587–1600)
- Mamia II Gurieli (1600–1625)
- Simon II Gurieli (1625)
- Malakia I Gurieli (1625–1639)
- Vakhtang II Gurieli (1639–1640)
- Kaikhosro I Gurieli (1640–1658)
- Demetrius Gurieli (1658–1664)
- George III Gurieli (1664–1684)
- Malakia II Gurieli (1684–1685, 1689)
- Kaikhosro II Gurieli (1685–1689)
- Mamia III Gurieli (1689–1712)
- George IV Gurieli (1711–1713, 1714–1717, 1717–1726)
- Kaikhosro III Gurieli (1717)
- Mamia IV Gurieli (1726–1756)
- George V Gurieli (1756–1758)
- Simon III Gurieli (1788–1792)
- Vakhtang III Gurieli (1792–1797)
- Mamia V Gurieli (1797–1826)
- Kaikhosro IV Gurieli (1797–1809)
- David Gurieli (1826–1829)

=== Princes of Svaneti ===
- Konstantine Dadeshkeliani (1826–1857)
  - Tsiokh Dadeshkeliani
  - Tengis Dadeshkeliani
  - Isam Dadeshkeliani

=== Princes of Meskheti ===
- Botso Jaqeli (c. 1184–1191)
- Ivane I Jaqeli (c. 1191–1247)
- Sargis I Jaqeli (1268–1279)
- Beka I Jaqeli (1285–1306)
- Sargis II Jaqeli (1306–1334)
- Qvarqvare I Jaqeli (1334–1361)
- Beka II Jaqeli (1361–1391)
- Shalva Jaqeli (1372–1389)
- Aghbugha I Jaqeli (1389–1395)
- Ivane II Jaqeli (1391–1444)
- Aghbugha II Jaqeli (1444–1451)
- Qvarqvare II Jaqeli (1451–1498)
- Kaikhosro I Jaqeli (1498–1500)
- Mzetchabuk Jaqeli (1500–1515)
- Manuchar I Jaqeli (1515–1518)
- Qvarqvare III Jaqeli (1518–1535)
- Kaikhosro II Jaqeli (1545–1573)
- Qvarqvare IV Jaqeli (1573–1581)
- Manuchar II Jaqeli (1581–1607)
- Manuchar III Jaqeli (1607–1628)
- Beka III Jaqeli (1625–1635)
- Yusuf I Jaqeli (1635–1647)
- Rostom Jaqeli (1647–1658)
- Aslan I Jaqeli (1658–1679)
- Yusuf II Jaqeli (1679–1688)
- Salim Jaqeli (1688–1701)
- Isaq I Jaqeli (1701–1705, 1708–1716, 1718–1737, 1744–1745)

=== Princes of Abkhazia ===
- Putu Sharvashidze (c. 1580–1620)
- Seteman Sharvashidze (c. 1620–1640)
- Sustar Sharvashidze (c. 1640–1665)
- Zegnak Sharvashidze (c. 1665–1700)
- Rostom Sharvashidze (c. 1700–1730)
- Manuchar Sharvashidze (c. 1730–1750)
- Zurab Sharvashidze (c. 1750–1780)
- Kelesh Ahmed-Bey Sharvashidze (circa 1780–1808)
- Aslan-Bey Sharvashidze (1808–1810)
- Sefer Ali-Bey Sharvashidze (George) (1810–1821)
- Umar-Bey (Demetreus) (1821–1822)
- Mikhail Sharvashidze (1822–1864)
- Abkhazia incorporated into the Russian Empire (1864)
- Giorgi Mikhailovitch Sharvashidze (1866–1918)
- Aleksandr Sharvashidze (1918–1968)

Direct descendants through the elder legitimate line from Aslan Bey Sharvashidze

- George Konstantinovich Sharvashidze (1973–2010)
- Teimuraz Georgievitch Sharvashidze (2010-)
- Nikoloz Sharvashidze

=== Princes, dukes and grand dukes of Samegrelo ===
- Vardan I Dadiani (c. 1180s – 1190s)
- Shergil Dadiani (c. 1220s – 1240s)
- Vardan II Dadiani (c. 1240s – 1250s)
- Tsotne Dadiani (c. 1260s)
- Bedan Dadiani (c. 1270s – 1290s)
- George I Dadiani (c. 1293–1323)
- Goshadze Dynasty (XIII–XIX)
- Mamia I Dadiani (1323–1345)
- George II Dadiani (1345–1384)
- Vameq I Dadiani (1384–1396)
- Mamia II Dadiani (1396–1414)
- Liparit I Dadiani (1414–1470)
- Shamadavle Dadiani (1470–1473)
- Vameq II Dadiani (1474–1482)
- Liparit II Dadiani (1482–1512)
- Mamia III Dadiani (1512–1533)
- Levan I Dadiani (1533–1572)
- George III Dadiani (1572–1573, 1578–1582)
- Mamia IV Dadiani (1573–1578, 1582–1590)
- Manuchar I Dadiani (1590–1611)
- Levan II Dadiani (1611–1657)
- Liparit III Dadiani (1657–1658)
- Vameq III Dadiani (1658–1661)
- Levan III Dadiani (1661–1681)
- Levan IV Dadiani (1683–1691)
- George IV Dadiani (Lipartiani) (1694–1704, 1710–1715)
- Katsia I Dadiani (1704–1710)
- Bezhan Dadiani (1715–1728)
- Otia Dadiani (1728–1758)
- Katsia II Dadiani (1758–1788)
- Grigol Dadiani (1788–1791, 1794–1802, 1802–1804)
- Manuchar II Dadiani (1791–1793)
- Tariel Dadiani (1793–1794, 1802)
- Levan V Dadiani (1804–1840)
- David Dadiani (1840–1853)
- Niko I Dadiani (1853–1857)
- Niko I Dadiani (1857–1903)
- Niko II Dadiani (1903–1919)
- Shalva Dadiani (1919–1959)
- Archil Dadiani (1959–1976)
