= Mamia I Gurieli =

Prince of Guria
- Reign: 1512–1534
- Predecessor: George I Gurieli
- Successor: Rostom Gurieli
- Died: 1534
- Spouse: Ketevan
- Issue: Rostom Gurieli; George; Tinatin
- House: Gurieli
- Father: George I Gurieli
- Religion: Georgian Orthodox Church (Catholicate of Abkhazia)

Mamia I Gurieli (Georgian: მამია I გურიელი; died 1534), of the House of Gurieli, was Prince of Guria from 1512 until his death in 1534. Succeeding on the death of his father George I Gurieli, Mamia became involved in the conflict between the two eastern Georgian kingdoms of Kartli and Kakheti in 1520; by force of arms, he compelled David X to agree on peace with Levan of Kakheti, his son-in-law. Mamia Gurieli's 1533 campaign, jointly with his namesake Prince of Mingrelia, against the homebase of Circassian pirates ended in a fiasco, with Mamia being captured and ransomed later that year.

== Accession and early rule ==
Mamia was a son of George I Gurieli, on whose death he succeeded as mtavari ("prince") of Guria, a polity in western Georgia, on the Black Sea coast, which emerged as a sovereign principality after the dissolution of the Kingdom of Georgia in 1491. Mamia acceded to the throne by blessing of King Bagrat III of Imereti, his royal suzerain. In modern historiography, he is sometimes assigned the regnal number "III" by virtue of his being the third Mamia with the style of Gurieli, the first being a son of Kakhaber I Gurieli and the second being Mamia (II) Gurieli.

In 1520, Mamia was approached by Levan, king of Kakheti in eastern Georgia, with the request that he marry his daughter to Levan and aid the king against the encroachments of David X, King of Kartli. Mamia, having secured for his troops a free passage from the atabeg of Samtskhe, traversed Ghado mountain, advanced into Kartli and defeated David X at Mokhisi. The latter fell back to his capital of Tbilisi and was setting a counter-attack in motion, when a dignitary, sent by Gurieli for parley, persuaded the king to join Mamia and Levan of Kakheti at a peace summit at Mukhrani. After the peace arrangement, Mamia sent his daughter Tinatin to marry Levan.

== Expedition in Zygia ==
In 1533, Mamia Gurieli joined his forces with Mamia III Dadiani, Prince of Mingrelia, in an expedition against the piratical Circassian tribe of Zygii, whose vessels frequented the Black Sea coastline of Guria and Mingrelia. A combined navy landed the Mingrelian and Gurian forces on 30 January 1533. The first encounter with the fiercely defending Zygii was won by the allies, but, on the next day, many battle-fatigued Mingrelian nobles defected their lord at the instigation of Tsandia Inal-Ipa, an Abkhaz. The allies were routed. Mamia Gurieli was taken prisoner, while his son George and Mamia Dadiani of Mingrelia were killed. Later, Malachias I Abashidze, Catholicos of Imereti and Abkhazia, went to the Zygii and ransomed the survivors and bodies of those who died. Mamia died in 1534 and was succeeded by his son Rostom Gurieli.

== Family ==
Mamia Gurieli was married to Princess Ketevan (Keteon), whose origin is not known. She is mentioned in two 15th-century church documents, agape records. Mamia had two sons and at least one daughter:

- Rostom (died 1566), Prince of Guria (r. 1534–1556);
- George (died 1533), killed during the expedition against the Zygii;
- Tinatin (died 1591), first wife of King Levan of Kakheti.

Mamia I Gurieli House of Gurieli
Regnal titles
Preceded by George I Gurieli	Prince of Guria; 1512–1534	Succeeded by Rostom Gurieli
