= Levan IV Dadiani =

Prince of Mingrelia
- Reign: 1683—1691
- Predecessor: Levan III Dadiani
- Successor: George IV Dadiani
- Died: 1694
- Spouse: Tinatin of Imereti
- Issue: George Dadiani
- House: Dadiani
- Father: Levan III Dadiani
- Religion: Georgian Orthodox Church (Catholicate of Abkhazia)

Levan IV Dadiani (Georgian: ლევან IV დადიანი; died 1694) was Prince of Mingrelia from 1683 until 1691, when he was forced to abdicate and retire to Constantinople, where he died. A natural son of the preceding Levan III Dadiani, he was the last of the First House of Dadiani to rule Mingrelia, a principality in western Georgia. The succeeding dynasty were the Chikovani, who assumed the surname of Dadiani and continued to rule Mingrelia until 1867.

== Reign ==
After the death of Levan III Dadiani and murder of his rightful heir, Manuchar, at the hands of George III Gurieli, Prince of Guria, Levan IV Dadiani, the only surviving son of his namesake father, was installed as Prince of Mingrelia by George Lipartiani, of the Chikovani family, who had risen to influence and prestige under Levan III. Lipartiani became the de facto ruler of the principality, reducing Levan IV's power to insignificance. Having eliminated opposition by killings and harassment in the name of Levan and having enriched himself by slave-trading, Lipartiani forced Levan IV to abdicate in 1691. Levan first fled to Kartli in eastern Georgia and then retired to the Ottoman capital of Constantinople, where he died in 1694.

== Family ==
Levan Dadiani was married to Princess Tinatin (1678–1760), daughter of King Bagrat IV of Imereti. She became a nun in 1704 under the name of Nino and arrived in Russia in the suite of the exiled King Vakhtang VI in 1724.

Levan had a natural son, George Dadiani (1683 – 12 June 1765), who emigrated, in 1700, to Russia, where he became known as Prince Yegor Dadian and attained to the rank of major-general. His descendants flourished in Russia.

Levan IV Dadiani House of Dadiani Born: ? Died: 1694
Regnal titles
| Preceded by Levan III Dadiani | Prince of Mingrelia; 1683–1691 | Succeeded by George IV Dadiani |
