= Vakhtang II Gurieli =

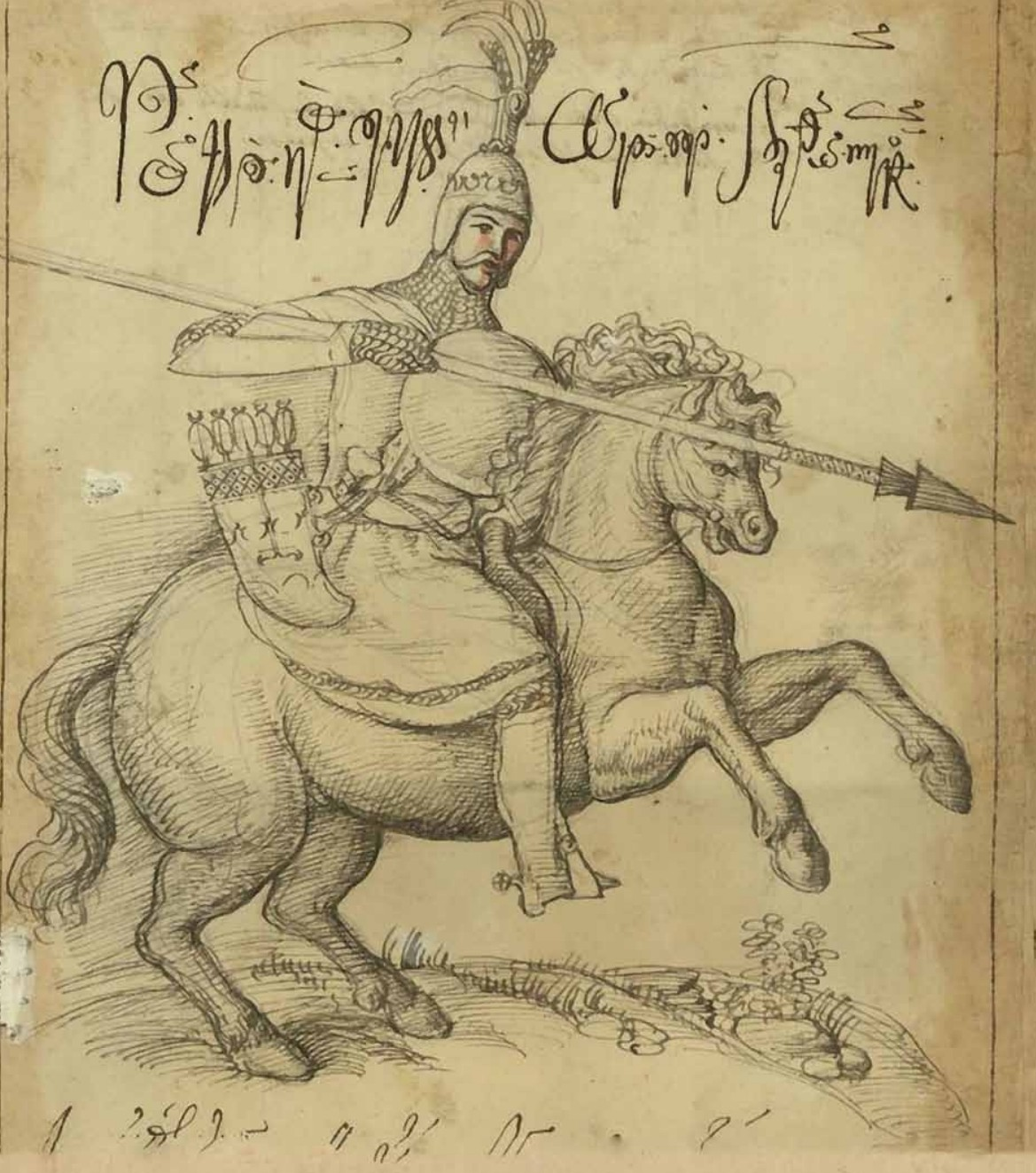
- Vakhtang II Gurieli by Teramo Castelli.

Prince of Guria
- Reign: 1639–1640
- Predecessor: Malakia I Gurieli
- Successor: Kaikhosro I Gurieli
- Died: 1640
- House: Gurieli
- Father: George II Gurieli
- Religion: Georgian Orthodox Church (Catholicate of Abkhazia)

Vakhtang II Gurieli (Georgian: ვახტანგ II გურიელი; died 1640), of the House of Gurieli, was Prince of Guria from 1639 until his death in 1640. He was installed as ruler by Levan II Dadiani, Prince of Mingrelia, and governed Guria as his vassal. During his reign, he expelled Catholic missionaries from Guria.

== Biography ==
Vakhtang was the youngest son of George II Gurieli, Prince of Guria. Prior to his accession, he possessed the Bzhuzhi River valley. At the beginning of the 17th century, during the reign of his elder brother Mamia II Gurieli, he built the Church of the Nativity of the Virgin next to the cathedral of Shemokmedi in order to protect the ecclesiastical holy relics transferred from Zarzma (Samtskhe), and donated to it several noble families and 80 peasant households.

In 1639, after the death of his brother Malakia I Gurieli, who had been appointed Prince of Guria by Levan II Dadiani, Prince of Mingrelia, the latter immediately entered Guria with an army in order to maintain his dominion there. Against the wishes of the Gurian nobles, who wanted to install a prince independent of Mingrelia, he appointed Vakhtang II Gurieli as Prince of Guria, who ruled as his vassal.

In 1640, Vakhtang II expelled Cristoforo Castelli and other missionaries from Guria. Vakhtang II Gurieli's reign did not last long, and he died in 1640. He was succeeded by Kaikhosro I Gurieli.

== Bibliography ==
- Antelava, Ilia (1990). ლევან II დადიანი [Levan II Dadiani] (in Georgian). Tbilisi: Merani.
