= George II Gurieli =

Prince of Guria

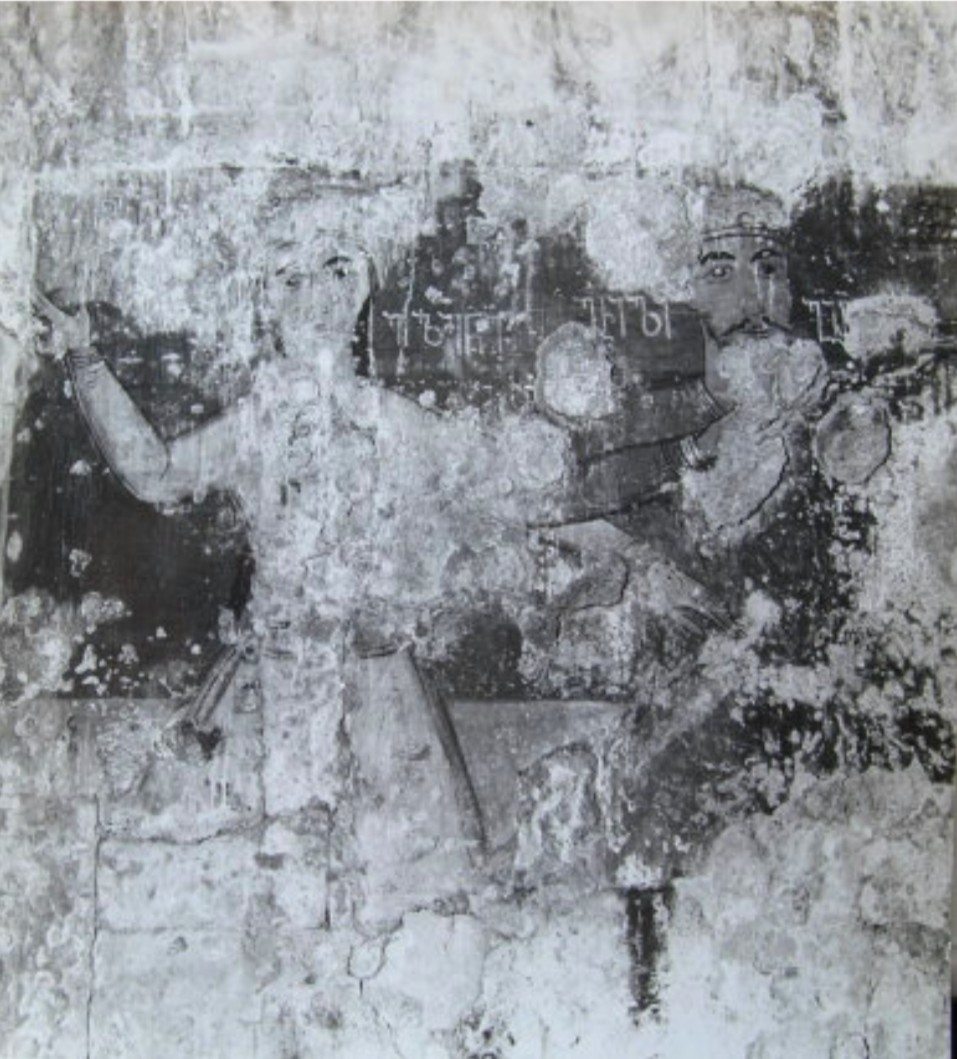
- George II Gurieli and his wife Elene, fresco from Shemokmedi Monastery, between 1600-1609/10 .

Prince of Guria
- 1st reign: 1564–1583
- Predecessor: Rostom Gurieli
- Successor: Vakhtang I Gurieli
- 2nd reign: 1587–1600
- Predecessor: Vakhtang I Gurieli
- Successor: Mamia II Gurieli
- Died: 1600
- Spouse: 1) Daughter of Levan I Dadiani; 2) Elene
- Issue: Mamia II Gurieli; Malakia I Gurieli; Vakhtang II Gurieli
- House: Gurieli
- Father: Rostom Gurieli
- Mother: Princess Tinatin
- Religion: Georgian Orthodox Church (Catholicate of Abkhazia)

George II Gurieli (Georgian: გიორგი II გურიელი, romanized: giorgi II gurieli; died 1600), of the House of Gurieli, was Prince of Guria from 1564 to 1583 and again from 1587 to 1600. Succeeding on the death of his father Rostom Gurieli, George's rule over his small principality, located in southwest Georgia, was a period of conflict with the neighboring Dadiani of Mingrelia and increasing assertiveness of the Ottomans whom Gurieli submitted in 1581. His reign was interrupted, from 1583 to 1587, by a Mingrelian invasion, but George was able to resume the throne with Ottoman support.

== Accession ==
George II Gurieli succeeded on the death of his father Rostom Gurieli in 1564. The entire length of his reign saw continuation of political strife, territorial disputes, plots and counterplots, jealousies and feuds among the rulers of a now-fragmented Georgia, occurring against the background of the expansion of the Ottoman Empire into western Georgia and the Ottoman–Safavid rivalry in the Caucasus. In modern historiography, he is sometimes assigned the regnal number "III" by virtue of his being the third George with the style of Gurieli, the first being a son of Kakhaber I Gurieli in the 14th century and the second being George Gurieli, ruling from 1483 to 1512.

== Conflict with Dadiani ==
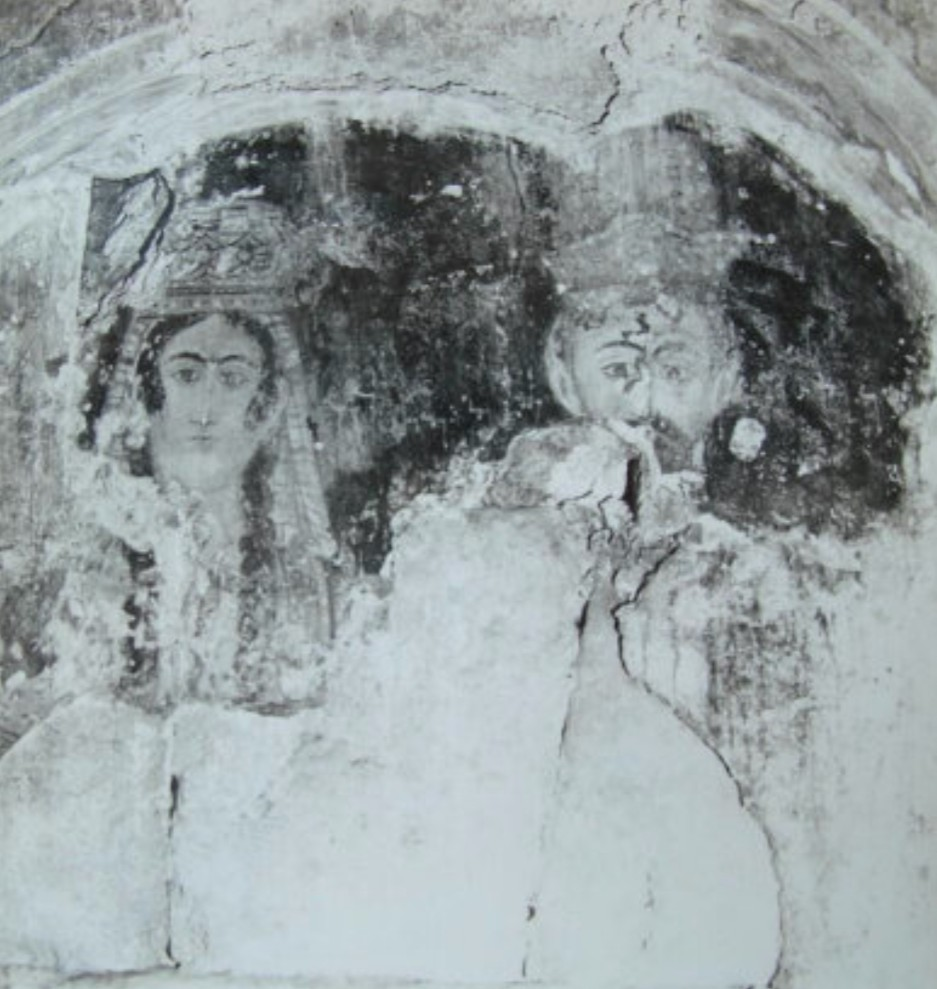
George II Gurieli and his wife Elene, fresco from Shemokmedi Monastery, between 1625-1636.

In 1568, Gurieli supported his nominal royal suzerain, King George III of Imereti, against Levan I Dadiani, who was expelled from Mingrelia. Beyond political and territorial disputes, the Gurieli–Dadiani conflict also had personal dimensions: Gurieli's pride was wounded by repudiation of his sister by her husband, Levan Dadiani's son George; George Gurieli responded by marrying and then divorcing Levan's daughter. The ousted Dadiani returned with an Ottoman force and compelled Gurieli to buy peace for 10,000 dirhams.

Shortly after Levan's death in 1572, George Gurieli invaded Mingrelia and deposed Levan's successor and his former son-in-law George Dadiani in favor of Mamia IV Dadiani, whom he then gave his sister in marriage. The king of Imereti intervened in 1578 and, having extracted territorial concessions from George Dadiani, brokered a deal between the two Georges: the deposed Dadiani was allowed to resume his reign in exchange of paying an indemnity to Gurieli for the past offences such as his abandonment of his first wife, Gurieli's sister. As George Dadiani was short of money, he had to surrender to Gurieli Khobi until the due amount of gold was extracted in full from that town.

Around 1580, George Gurieli profited from yet another disorder in Mingrelia. George Dadiani's uncle Batulia, the lord of Sajavakho, whom the Mingrelian ruler had earlier humiliated by taking his wife, plotted a revolt. Dadiani mobilized his loyal forces in time; Batulia had to flee to Guria. In exchange of capturing the rebel, Gurieli took Sajavkho for himself and then allowed Dadiani's agents to kill Batulia in a prison in Ozurgeti.

== Raid in Kartli ==
While the Georgian rulers were preoccupied with their own struggles, a new war between the Ottoman Empire and Safavid Persia had erupted in 1578. The Ottomans, who claimed suzerainty over all of western Georgia, compelled the king of Imereti, Gurieli, and Dadiani to join war efforts against the Safavid-dominated Kingdom of Kartli in eastern Georgia in 1581. The three crossed into the marchlands of Kartli, found the locals in flight, burned down the emptied villages, and returned with no losses.

== Deposition and comeback ==
In 1582, George Gurieli's old adversary George Dadiani died and the princely throne of Mingrelia was taken over by his brother Mamia IV Dadiani, Gurieli's son-in-law, who persuaded Gurieli to capture and incarcerate his underage nephew Levan. Mamia then exploited the boy's death in a defenestration accident as a pretext to attack Guria in 1583. George Gurieli was defeated and replaced with Dadiani's protégé, Vakhtang I Gurieli. In his flight from Guria, George had to recourse to the Ottoman support and repaired to Constantinople. In 1587, aided by the death of Vakhtang, he succeeded in resuming his rule.

== Intervention in Imereti ==
In 1590, George Gurieli intervened in a chaotic civil war in the Kingdom of Imereti. He had his own nominee to the throne of Imereti, Bagrat, a grandson of Bagrat III of Imereti, whom he installed as king after defeating and expelling Rostom, a Mingrelian protégé, from Kutaisi. Gurieli left his son Mamia, to protect Bagrat and, with the help of a Turkish force, destroyed the fortress of Sebeka, possessed by the Chijavadze family, in the Imeretian borderlands, on his way back to Guria. Bagrat was quickly deposed by King Simon I of Kartli, who sought to bring all of Georgia under his scepter.

== Death ==
According to the 18th-century historian Prince Vakhushti of Kartli, George Gurieli died in 1600, the dating supported also by one contemporary document and generally accepted in modern scholarship. On the other hand, a note attached to the 17th-century liturgical collection (gulani) from the Shemokmedi Monastery dates George's death to 1598. He was succeeded by his son Mamia II Gurieli.

== Family ==
George II Gurieli was married twice. His first marriage, around 1566, was to an unnamed daughter of Levan I Dadiani, whom he divorced soon after. His second marriage was to Elene, a Circassian woman and sister-in-law of King George II of Imereti. By his second wife, George Gurieli had three sons:

- Mamia II Gurieli (c. 1572/1574 – 1625), Prince of Guria (r. 1600–1625);
- Malakia Gurieli (1577–1639), Catholicos of Abkhazia (1619–1639) under the name Malakia II, and Prince of Guria (r. 1625–1639) under the name Malakia I;
- Vakhtang II Gurieli (died 1640), Prince of Guria (r. 1639–1640).

== Bibliography ==
- Chkhataraishvili, Kveli (1959). გურიის სამთავრო : პოლიტიკური და სოციალურ-ეკონომიური ისტორიის ნარკვევი (in Georgian).

George II Gurieli House of Gurieli
Regnal titles
Preceded by Rostom Gurieli	Prince of Guria; 1564–1583	Succeeded by Vakhtang I Gurieli
Preceded by Vakhtang I Gurieli	Prince of Guria; 1587–1600	Succeeded by Mamia II Gurieli
