= George Gurieli =

George of Guria may refer to:

- George I Gurieli (died 1512), duke of the duchy of Guria from 1483 to 1491, later prince of the principality of Guria from 1491 to 1512.
- George II Gurieli (died 1600), prince of Guria from 1564 to 1583 and again from 1587 to 1600.
- George III Gurieli (died 1684), prince of Guria from 1664 to 1684.
- George IV Gurieli (died 1726), prince of Guria from 1711 to 1726.
