= Kaikhosro I Gurieli =

Member of the House of Gurieli

Prince of Guria
- Reign: 1640–1658
- Predecessor: Vakhtang II Gurieli
- Successor: Demetrius Gurieli
- Died: 1660
- Spouse: Khvaramze Goshadze (m. 1647)
- Issue Among others: George III Gurieli; Malakia II Gurieli
- House: Gurieli
- Father: Vakhtang I Gurieli
- Mother: Tamar Jaqeli
- Religion: Georgian Orthodox Church (Catholicate of Abkhazia)

Kaikhosro I Gurieli (Georgian: ქაიხოსრო I გურიელი; died 1660), of the House of Gurieli, was Prince of Guria from 1640 to 1658. He was installed by Levan II Dadiani, Prince of Mingrelia. In his turn, Kaikhosro was overthrown and expelled by King Alexander III of Imereti. His comeback to Guria, in an Ottoman-supported endeavor, concluded with his assassination by a Gurian nobleman.

== Biography ==
Kaikhosro Gurieli was the son of Vakhtang I Gurieli. He was installed, in 1640, by Levan II Dadiani, Prince of Mingrelia. In 1658, Kaikhosro supported his uterine half-brother Liparit III Dadiani against Alexander III, King of Imereti. At the battle of Bandza in June 1658, Alexander won a decisive victory and established loyal regimes in Guria and Mingrelia. Kaikhosro was forced in exile to Istanbul. He then secured support of the Ottoman pasha of Akhaltsikhe Rustam, a Muslim Georgian, and capitalized on the anarchy in Imereti following King Alexander's death to attack his rival prince Demetrius Gurieli in 1660. Vameq III Dadiani intervened with a force of Mingrelians, Imeretians, and Abkhazians to protect Demetrius. Kaikhosro took shelter at the Achi Monastery and counterattacked, succeeding in taking Ozurgeti, Guria's chief town. Kaikhosro's triumph was short-lived; he was treacherously murdered by the Gurian nobleman Machutadze and Guria reverted to Demetrius Gurieli. Kaikhosro's sons George and Malakia fled to Akhaltsikhe.

== Family ==
In 1647, Kaikhosro I Gurieli married Princess Khvaramze Goshadze (fl. 1664). They had three sons and three daughters:

- George III Gurieli (1651–1684), Prince of Guria (r. 1664–1684) and King of Imereti (r. 1681–1683);
- Malakia II Gurieli (died after 1689), Bishop of Shemokmedi and Jumati, and Prince of Guria (r. 1684–1685, 1689)
- Otia;
- Tuta (died 1678), who married Prince Levan of Kartli;
- Darejan, who married Prince Giorgi Tavdgiridze;
- An unnamed daughter, who married Alexander, son of Levan II Dadiani.

== Bibliography ==
- Toumanoff, Cyril (1976). Manuel de Généalogie et de Chronologie pour l'histoire de la Caucasie chrétienne (Arménie, Géorgie, Albanie) [Manual of Genealogy and Chronology of Christian Caucasian History (Armenia, Georgia, Albania)] (in French). Rome: Edizioni Aquila.
- Chkhataraishvili, Kveli (1959). გურიის სამთავრო : პოლიტიკური და სოციალურ-ეკონომიური ისტორიის ნარკვევი (in Georgian).

Kaikhosro I Gurieli House of Gurieli
Regnal titles
Preceded by Vakhtang II Gurieli	Prince of Guria; 1640–1658	Succeeded by Demetrius Gurieli
