= Sophia, Princess of Guria =

Princess consort of Guria

Sophia

Princess consort of Guria
- Tenure: 1814–1826

Regent of Guria
- Regency: 1826–1829
- Prince: David Gurieli
- Died: 7 September 1829; Gonio, Ottoman Empire
- Spouse: Mamia V Gurieli
- Issue: Ekaterina; David; Kochibrola; Sophia; Terezia
- House: Tsulukidze (by birth); Gurieli (by marriage)
- Father: Giorgi Tsulukidze
- Religion: Georgian Orthodox Church

Sophia Gurieli (Georgian: სოფიო გურიელი, romanized: sopio gurieli), née Tsulukidze (წულუკიძე; died 7 September 1829) was a princess consort of Guria, in southwestern Georgia, as the wife of Mamia V Gurieli. She served as regent for her underage son David Gurieli in 1826–1829. In 1829 she resisted the Russian encroachment on Gurian self-rule and sided with the Ottoman Empire, but failed and had to flee to Trebizond, where she died the same year.

== Marriage and regency ==
Princess Sophia was a daughter of Giorgi Tsulukidze, a high-ranking nobleman of the Tsulukidze family in the Kingdom of Imereti. Around 1814, she married Mamia V Gurieli, ruler of Guria. They had five children together, one son and four daughters. Mamia, who had accepted Russian suzerainty over his principality in 1810, died on 21 November 1826, at the age of 37. The widowed princess Sophia hurried to proclaim the succession of her underage son David under her own tutelage on 24 November 1826. The Russian commander-in-chief in the Caucasus, General Aleksey Yermolov, insisted the move was not valid until sanctioned by the Russian government. Eventually, the two sides agreed to appoint a regency council—headquartered in Nagomari—presided by Sophia and consisting of the leading nobles of Guria. The Gurian leaders quickly became divided in loyalties and Sophia suspected the Russians were making use of the council to undermine her authority and Guria's autonomy.

== Russo-Turkish War ==
Map of the Principality of Guria

As the war between Russian and Ottoman empires was approaching, Sophia opened clandestine negotiations with the Ottoman representatives and reached out to Gurian political exiles who had fled to the Ottoman-controlled district of Kobuleti during the 1820 anti-Russian rebellion. Sophia and her favorite, Prince David Machutadze, became vocal in calling for a break with Russia. Unlike Imereti and Mingrelia, Guria did not raise a volunteer force to join Russian war efforts during the siege of the Ottoman fortress of Poti, immediately north of Guria. Furthermore, Sophia expelled Mingrelian military posts from the shores of Lake Paliastomi and replaced them with stronger Gurian patrols, opening a line of communications with Poti and causing the Russian commander-in-chief Ivan Paskevich to forewarn her of the consequences.

The fall of Poti to the Russian troops forced Princess Sophia to step back and write a letter to Paskevich, promising to rally a Gurian force to aid the Russians in the conquest of Kobuleti and Batumi. Paskevich gave the regent two weeks to fulfill her promise and sent General Karl Hesse's two battalions to Guria, ostensibly bound for cooperation with the Gurian forces. Sensing the imminent threat, on the night of 1 to 2 October 1828, Sophia with her son David and the eldest daughter Ekaterina and an entourage of loyal nobles fled Guria to Kobuleti. The Russian troops quickly occupied Guria, seizing Sophia's two little daughters at the Gurieli castle of Likhauri, and repulsed an attack from the Ottoman territory on the frontier fort of St. Nicholas. Sophia was declared deposed, her properties confiscated, and a provisional administration—consisting of four Russia-friendly Gurian princes and presided by the Russian colonel Kulyabka—was set up to run the principality, nominally, in the name of Prince David.

== Downfall and death ==
In the spring of 1829, Sophia, from her residence at the Kintrishi glade, in the immediate neighborhood of Guria, issued proclamations to the Gurians calling on them to resist the Russians and defend their rightful sovereign. Paskevich sent her several letters promising amnesty for her and her followers and respect for David's right to the princely title, if she broke with the Ottomans and immediately returned to Guria. In case of refusal, the Russian threatened to pronounce David "a traitor" and strip him of his right to rule. Paskevich's letters were intercepted by the Ottoman authorities and never reached the addressee. In the meantime, General Hesse took Kintrishi on 9 August 1829. Sophia, David, and their retinue narrowly escaped to Trebizond, where the princess, exhausted and demoralized, died at the small town of Akçaabat (Platana) on 7 September 1829 and was buried at the local Greek monastery of St. Sofia; her grave has been lost. On 9 September 1829, David was proclaimed deposed and Guria was directly annexed to the Russian Empire.
