= Kakhaber II Gurieli =

Kakhaber II Gurieli (Georgian: კახაბერ II გურიელი; died 1483), of the House of Gurieli, was eristavi ("duke") of Guria from c. 1469 until his death in 1483.

Kakhaber Gurieli was a son and successor of Mamia Gurieli and, like his predecessor, was involved in the final stages of a civil war that brought about the dissolution of the Kingdom of Georgia. This conflict, climaxing in the 1460s, pitted King George VIII against the local rulers such as Bagrat II of Imereti and Qvarqvare II Jaqeli, Atabeg of Samtskhe. Kakhaber rendered his support to both of these. In reward, Qvarqvare ceded his rights in the provinces of Adjara and Chaneti to Gurieli, who conquered these lands by force of arms, decimating or expelling those nobles who remained loyal to the king of Georgia.

Kakhaber's relations with Bagrat of Imereti, the newly crowned king in western Georgia, became soured over Gurieli's efforts to foster his autonomy and his support to the rebellion of his cousin Vameq II Dadiani, Prince of Mingrelia. After Bagrat's death in 1478, Kakhaber and Vameq refused to acknowledge the late king's successor Alexander II and aided the rival monarch, Constantine II of Kartli, in taking hold of Imereti in 1479. Kakhaber died in 1483. He was succeeded by George I Gurieli, his only known son by the marriage with Ana, who is known from an icon inscription from the Shemokmedi Monastery.

== Sources ==
Kakhaber II Gurieli House of Gurieli
Regnal titles
Preceded by Mamia Gurieli	Duke of Guria; 1469–1483	Succeeded by George I Gurieli
