= Demetrius Gurieli =

King of Imereti

Prince of Guria
- Reign: 1658–1664
- Predecessor: Kaikhosro I Gurieli
- Successor: George III Gurieli

King of Imereti
- Reign: 1663–1664
- Predecessor: Archil II
- Successor: Bagrat IV
- Died: 1668
- House: Gurieli
- Father: Simon II Gurieli
- Religion: Georgian Orthodox Church (Catholicate of Abkhazia)

Demetrius Gurieli (Georgian: დემეტრე გურიელი, died c. 1668), of the House of Gurieli, was Prince of Guria from 1658 to 1664 and King of Imereti from 1663 to 1664. His rule in Guria as well as in Imereti were result of coups and part of a chaotic civil war raging in these western Georgian polities. Demetre's royal career in Imereti terminated with his deposition and blinding.

== Biography ==
Demetrius was a member of the Gurieli, a family of princes-regnant of Guria. His parentage is not directly attested in the surviving chronicles and documents; Demetrius appears to have been a son of Simon II Gurieli, a patricide, who was deposed and blinded in 1625. Demetre emerged from obscurity in 1658, when he was installed in Guria by King Alexander III of Imereti in place of his relative Kaikhosro I Gurieli, whom the king had deposed and forced into exile in Istanbul. Formerly an Orthodox monk, Demetrius recompensed his act of unfrocking by donating the church of the Redeemer in Aketi as a metochion to the patriarchal see of Bichvinta. In 1660, Kaikhosro, with Ottoman support, returned and put Demetrius to flight to Imereti. Demetrius was able to resume his rule in Guria after having Prince Machutadze murdered Kaikhosro.

In the conflict with Kaikhosro, Demetrius relied on Vameq III Dadiani, an ambitious prince of Mingrelia and briefly king of Imereti, whom he eventually betrayed and joined King Vakhtang V, King of Kartli, who intervened in the chaotic civil war in Imereti in 1661. Amid a series of coups and counter-coups, one part of the Imeretian nobles made Demetre king after the abdication of Vakhtang V's son Archil II in 1663. His rule proved short-lived: the Imeretians caught, blinded, and expelled him and restored Bagrat IV. According to the 18th-century Georgian historian Prince Vakhushti, Demetrius' final downfall occurred in 1668. Thereafter he disappeared from history. As prince of Guria, he was succeeded by George III Gurieli, an exiled son of his erstwhile foe, Kaikhosro Gurieli. Vakhushti's dating is sometimes questioned in modern historiography, notably by Davit Khakhutaishvili, who argued that Demetrius' rule in Guria should have ended no later than 1664.

Demetrius Gurieli House of Gurieli
Regnal titles
| Preceded by Kaikhosro I Gurieli | Prince of Guria; 1658–1664 | Succeeded by George III Gurieli |
| Preceded by Archil II | King of Imereti; 1663–1664 | Succeeded by Bagrat IV |
