= David Gurieli =

Georgian nobleman

Prince of Guria
- Reign: 24 November 1826 – 9 September 1829
- Predecessor: Mamia V Gurieli
- Successor: Russian annexation
- Regent: Sophia Tsulukidze
- Born: 1818
- Died: 23 August 1839 (aged 20–21)
- House: Gurieli
- Father: Mamia V Gurieli
- Mother: Sophia Tsulukidze
- Religion: Georgian Orthodox Church

David Gurieli (Georgian: დავით გურიელი, romanized: davit gurieli; Russian: Давид Мамиевич Гуриель, David Mamiyevich Guriel; 1818 – 23 August 1839) was a Georgian nobleman of the House of Gurieli. He was the last titular Prince of Guria from 24 November 1826 to 9 September 1829, but he never actually ruled because of his young age and then due to the Russian occupation of his principality. He reconciled with the Russians and returned from his Ottoman exile as a private citizen in 1832. He was subsequently trained as an officer of the Imperial Russian Army and served in the Caucasus, where he died at the battle of Akhulgo.

== Accession and regency ==
David was the second child and only son of Mamia V Gurieli, Prince-regnant of Guria, and his wife, Princess Sophia Tsulukidze. He was born in 1818, the year when western Georgia was rocked by a rebellion against the Russian Empire of which Guria was a subject since 1811. Mamia maintained loyalty to Russia when the revolt spread to Guria in 1820, but the fighting and destruction plunged him into depression. He died on 21 November 1826, when David was eight years old. Three days later, the princess dowager Sophia declared her son the next ruler and herself the boy-prince's regent. The Russian viceroy, General Aleksey Yermolov, denounced the move as unilateral and invalid until it was approved by an Imperial decree. Eventually, at Yermolov's insistence, Sophia had to share power with the Regency Council presided by herself and consisting of the leading nobles of Guria.

Sophia, offended and indignant at what she saw was an infringement on Guria's autonomy, entered into secret negotiations with the Ottoman government. She also had contacts with the Gurian political exiles who had fled to the Ottoman-controlled district of Kobuleti during the 1820 rebellion. When the Russian and Ottoman empires went to war in April 1828, the Gurian elites became even more divided in their loyalties. A small, but vocal contingent led by Sophia and her chief adviser, Prince David Machutadze, advocated a break with Russia. Unlike Imereti and Mingrelia, Guria did not raise a volunteer force to join Russian war efforts during the siege of the Ottoman fortress of Poti, immediately north of Guria. Furthermore, Sophia expelled Mingrelian military posts from the shores of Lake Paliastomi and replaced them with stronger Gurian patrols, opening a line of communications with Poti and causing the Russian commander-in-chief Ivan Paskevich to forewarn her of the consequences. Paskevich soon received reports that Sophia had clandestinely placed Guria under the sultan's protection and around 10,000 Ottoman troops were amassing close to the borders with Guria.

== Exile and deposition ==
The fall of Poti to the Russian troops and Ottoman reverses in the Caucasus forced Princess Sophia to step back and write a letter to Paskevich, promising to marshal a Gurian force to aid the Russians in the conquest of Kobuleti and Batumi. Paskevich gave the regent two weeks to fulfill her promise and ordered General Karl Hesse to move into Guria with two battalions, ostensibly for cooperation with the Gurian forces. On the night of 1 to 2 October 1828, Sophia with her son David and the eldest daughter Ekaterina, accompanied by loyal nobles, fled Guria to Kobuleti. The Russian troops occupied Guria, seizing Sophia's two little daughters at the Gurieli castle of Likhauri, and repulsed an attack from the Ottoman territory on the frontier fort of St. Nicholas, inducing Sophia's flight from Kobuleti to Trebizond. Sophia was declared deposed, her properties confiscated, and a provisional administration—consisting of four Gurian princes and chaired by the Russian colonel Kulyabka—was set up to run the principality, nominally, in the name of Prince David.

In the spring of 1829, Sophia, from her base at the Kintrishi glade, close to Guria, issued proclamations to the Gurians calling on them to resist the Russians and defend their rightful sovereign. Paskevich sent her several letters promising amnesty for her and her followers and respect for David's right to the princely title, if she broke with the Ottomans and immediately returned to Guria. In case of refusal, the Russian threatened to pronounce David "a traitor" and strip him of his right to rule. Paskevich's letters were intercepted by the Ottoman authorities and never reached the princess. His attempts to lure David back also failed. In the meantime, General Hesse took Kintrishi on 9 August 1829. Sophia, David, and their retinue narrowly escaped to Trebizond, where the princess, exhausted and demoralized, died on 7 September 1829 and was buried at the local Greek monastery of St. Sophia. On 9 September 1829, David was proclaimed deposed and Guria was directly annexed to the Russian Empire.

== Return and death ==
The deposed prince and his eldest sister Ekaterine remained in the Ottoman Empire under the auspices of Prince Machutadze. On 25 January 1832, through the intercession of Paskevich's successor in the Caucasus, Baron Rosen, the Gurian exiles were granted amnesty by Tsar Nicholas I and were allowed to their homeland as private citizens. On 15 September 1832, they landed at Guria's port of St. Nicholas. Rosen was impressed by David's manners and "moral qualities". The young Gurieli was granted a lifetime pension and sent to Saint Petersburg to be enlisted in the Page Corps, where he completed his education in 1838. He was commissioned as a cornet of the Tsesarevich's Ataman Cossack Regiment of the Life Guards and sent to fight the Caucasian mountaineers led by Imam Shamil. He was killed in fighting on 23 August 1839, during the siege of Shamil's stronghold of Akhulgo. Unmarried and with no issue, David was the last in the direct princely line of the Gurieli dynasty.

== Notes ==
David Gurieli House of Gurieli
Regnal titles
| Preceded by Mamia V Gurieli | Prince of Guria; 1826–1829 | Succeeded by Russian annexation |
