= Vardan I Dadiani =

- Ruler of Odishi
- Successor: Shergil Dadiani
- Born: unknown
- Died: 1213
- Noble family: House of Dadiani

Vardan I Dadiani (Georgian: ვარდან I დადიანი) (died c. 1213) was a Georgian noble and the forefather of the Dadiani, the princely dynasty of Samegrelo (Mingrelia), a region in western Georgia which Vardan ruled as eristavi ("duke") from 1183 to 1213. He was a prominent courtier of Queen Tamar of Georgia, but fell out of favor after leading an abortive rebellion in support of Tamar's disgraced former husband George the Rus' in 1191.

== In royal service ==
A descendant of his namesake the eristavi ("duke") of Svaneti, a contemporary of King George II of Georgia (r. 1072–1089), Vardan belonged to the Marushiani-Vardanisdze dynasty and is one of the earliest members of this family to be mentioned under the surname Dadiani, possibly after the familial castle of Dadi. Vardan was appointed msakhurt-ukhutsesi ("Lord High Chamberlain") of Georgia and granted Odishi, that is, Samegrelo, as a fief by Tamar in 1183. In 1186 or 1187 Vardan fought with distinction in the victorious campaign against the Eldiguzid state in Arran, masterminded by Asat Grigolisdze, lord of Gishi, during which the Georgians raided Beylagan and the Araxes plain.

== In rebellion ==
Vardan's downfall came with the abortive rebellion raised by the nobles of western and southern Georgia on behalf of the exiled ex-consort of Queen Tamar, George the Rus' (Yuri Andreyevich), in 1191. By that time, Vardan had been one of the most influential dignitaries in Georgia, being in possession of Orbeti and Kaeni in the eastern part of the kingdom in addition to the vast lands in the west, from the Likhi mountains to Nicopsia, that is, "the whole of Svaneti, Abkhazia, Saegro, Guria, Samokalako, Racha, Takveri and Argveti". He brought these lands as well as the Sanigi and "Keshigi" (Circassians) over to the rebels' cause and crowned George as king of Georgia at the royal palace of Geguti near Kutaisi. Tamar's loyal amirspasalar (constable) Gamrekeli Toreli defeated Vardan's army at the Niali plain in Javakheti and forced the rest of the rebels, including George the Rus', into surrender. As a result, Vardan lost the office of Lord High Chamberlain and the fief of Kaeni, both of which were then conferred upon the queen's loyal noble Ivane Mkhargrdzeli. Thereafter, Vardan Dadiani played no significant role in the country’s political life and died around 1213. His descendants continued to flourish in western Georgia, eventually producing two important princely dynasties, those of Dadiani and Gurieli.
