= Vakhtang I Gurieli =

Historical Georgian ruler

Prince of Guria
- Reign: 1583–1587
- Predecessor: George II Gurieli
- Successor: George II Gurieli
- Died: 1587
- Burial: Shemokmedi Monastery
- Spouse: Tamar Jaqeli (m. 1583)
- Issue: Kaikhosro I Gurieli; Tamar
- House: Gurieli
- Father: Unknown
- Religion: Georgian Orthodox Church (Catholicate of Abkhazia)

Vakhtang I Gurieli (Georgian: ვახტანგ I გურიელი; died 1587), of the House of Gurieli, was Prince of Guria from 1583 to 1587. He ruled Guria, a small state in southwestern Georgia, as a client of Mamia IV Dadiani, Prince of Mingrelia, who had deposed George II Gurieli. Vakhtang was one of the sponsors of the Shemokmedi Monastery, Guria's principal cathedral.

== Biography ==
The ancestry of Vakhtang Gurieli is poorly documented. Prince Vakhushti's chronicle, one of the principal sources on Georgia's early modern history, refers to him as being "of a Gurieli stock", without elucidating his parentage. Contemporary documents suggest Vakhtang might have been a son of Rostom Gurieli and brother of George II Gurieli, a genealogy accepted in mainstream Georgian scholarship. On the other hand, the historian Cyril Toumanoff regarded him as a son of George II Gurieli.

Vakhtang was installed as prince-regnant of Guria by the neighboring ruler, Mamia IV Dadiani, Prince of Mingrelia, who had invaded Guria and expelled his brother-in-law George II Gurieli in 1583. Prior to his accession, Vakhtang was in possession of the canton of Kobuleti. George Gurieli fled to Constantinople to solicit the Ottoman support. He was in the Ottoman-controlled town of Gonio in 1587, when Vakhtang died, enabling George to reclaim Guria with the help of the Ottoman government. Vakhtang was buried at the Transfiguration Church in the Shemokmedi Monastery, which he had built.

== Family ==
He married, in 1583, Tamar (born 1561), a daughter of Kaikhosro II Jaqeli, Atabeg of Samtskhe, and former wife of the nobleman Kaikhosro Oravzhandashvili. Widowed, she remarried Manuchar I Dadiani in 1598. Vakhtang had a son and a daughter:

- Kaikhosro I Gurieli (died 1660), Prince of Guria (r. 1640–1658);
- Tamar, who married Papuna Chiladze.

== Bibliography ==
- Toumanoff, Cyril (1976). Manuel de Généalogie et de Chronologie pour l'histoire de la Caucasie chrétienne (Arménie, Géorgie, Albanie) [Manual of Genealogy and Chronology of Christian Caucasian History (Armenia, Georgia, Albania)] (in French). Rome: Edizioni Aquila.

Vakhtang I Gurieli House of Gurieli
Regnal titles
| Preceded by George II Gurieli | Prince of Guria; 1583–1587 | Succeeded by George II Gurieli |
