= Levan III Dadiani =

Prince of Mingrelia
- Reign: 1661—1680
- Predecessor: Vameq III Dadiani
- Successor: Levan IV Dadiani
- Born: Shamadavle
- Died: 1680
- Spouse: Tamar of Mukhrani (m. 1661; div. 1663) Tinatin of Imereti (m. 1663)
- Issue: Manuchar; Mzekhatun; Levan IV Dadiani (ill.)
- House: Dadiani
- Father: Jesse Dadiani
- Religion: Georgian Orthodox Church (Catholicate of Abkhazia)
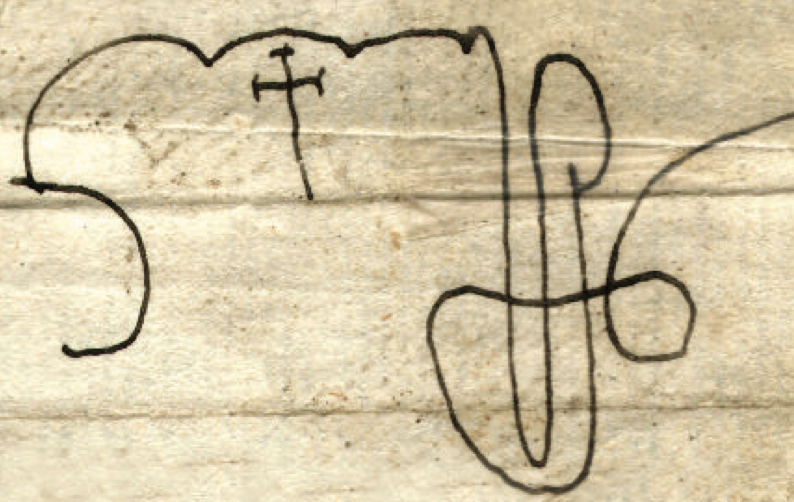
- Khelrtva

Levan III Dadiani (Georgian: ლევან III დადიანი), born Shamadavle (შამადავლე) (died 1680) was Prince of Mingrelia, of the House of Dadiani, from 1661 to 1680. His reign unfolded against the background of a series of civil wars in western Georgian polities, in which Levan III was an opponent of King Bagrat IV of Imereti to whom he lost a battle and his own wife.

== Early life ==
Shamadavle was a son of Jesse, brother of Levan II Dadiani, Prince of Mingrelia. In 1661, he was installed by King Vakhtang V as Prince of Mingrelia after evicting his relative, Vameq III Dadiani. Upon his enthronement, Shamadavle assumed the name of his uncle, Levan, and married Vakhtang's niece, Tamar.

== Civil wars ==
In 1663, Levan attempted to make use of palace intrigues plaguing the Kingdom of Imereti and attacked King Bagrat IV, who was married to Tamar's younger sister Tatia. Levan was defeated and made prisoner. While in captivity, he was forced to divorce Tamar, whom Bagrat took as his new wife. Instead, the prince of Mingrelia was convinced to marry Bagrat's sister, Tinatin, the former wife of the nobleman Goshadze, whom Levan suspected of adultery with his daughter. Levan was set free, but he remained deeply offended by the loss of his wife; hence, his enmity with Bagrat perpetuated.

In October 1672, Levan survived an invasion by an Ottoman force, which plundered Mingrelia, but failed to take the Rukhi fortress, where the Mingrelian prince had entrenched himself. The episode was witnessed and described in his travelogue by the French traveller Jean Chardin. By 1678, Levan again became involved in an Imeretian civil war, rendering his support to Bagrat IV's rival, Archil II, son of Vakhtang V of Kartli. When Bagrat was briefly deposed, the queen Tamar was arrested and sent back to Levan in Mingrelia. Next year, Bagrat reconquered Imereti with the Ottoman auxiliaries, then raided Mingrelia, and retook his wife. Levan was only able to resume his government with the help of George III Gurieli, Prince of Guria, whom he surrendered his son and heir, Manuchar, as a hostage to prove loyalty. His reign was further disturbed by the marauding raids by the Abkhaz on the Mingrelian borders.

Levan III Dadiani died in 1680. His heir, Manuchar, was murdered by George Gurieli as part of his ultimately failed design to seize control of Mingrelia. Levan III was, thus, succeeded by his natural son, Levan IV.

== Children ==
Levan III Dadiani had three children, two sons and a daughter.

- Manuchar (c. 1665–1680). As a young boy, he was betrothed to Darejan, daughter of King Archil II, but the marriage was never consummated.
- Levan IV Dadiani, Levan's son by a concubine and his successor as Prince of Mingrelia.
- Mzekhanum, who married Prince Katsia Chikovani, Lord of Lechkhumi.

Levan III Dadiani House of Dadiani Born: ? Died: 1680
Regnal titles
Preceded by Vameq III Dadiani	Prince of Mingrelia; 1661–1680	Succeeded by Levan IV Dadiani
