= Ekvtime Takaishvili =

Georgian historian and saint (1863–1953)

Ekvtime Takaishvili NHG
- ექვთიმე თაყაიშვილი
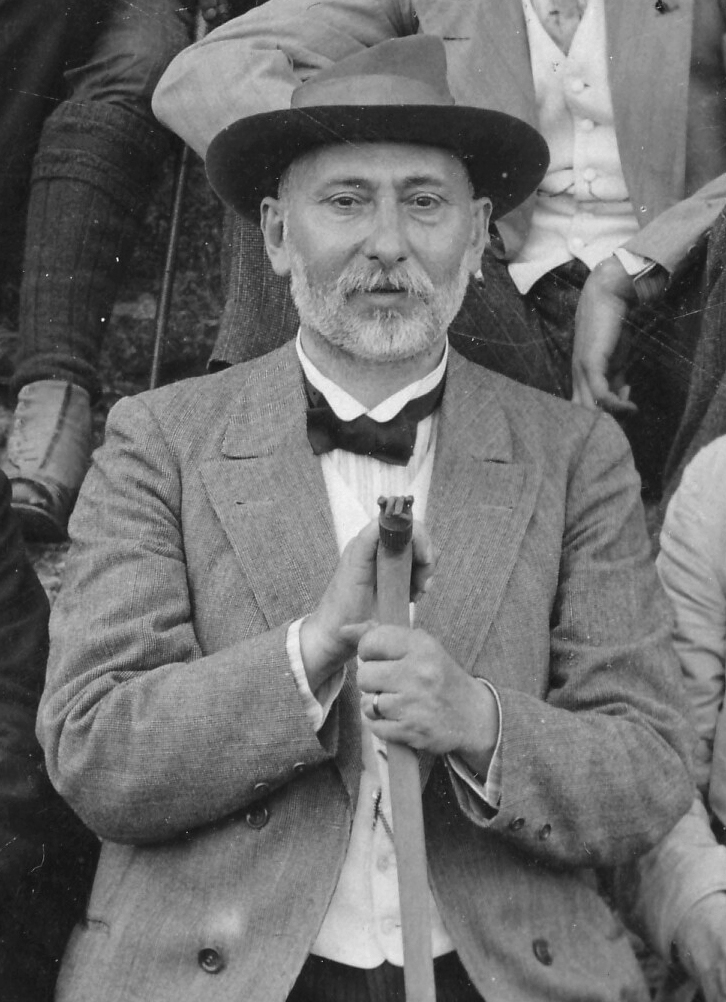

Member of the Constituent Assembly of Georgia
- In office 1919–1921

Personal details
- Born: January 3, 1863 Likhauri, Guria, Russian Empire
- Died: February 21, 1953 (aged 90) Tbilisi, Georgian SSR, Soviet Union
- Cause of death: Heart attack
- Resting place: Mtatsminda Pantheon
- Education: Saint Petersburg State University
- Occupation: Archeologist, Professor, Historian and public figure

Ekvtime Takaishvili (sometimes anglicised as Euthymius Takaishvili, also spelled Taqaishvili, Georgian: ექვთიმე თაყაიშვილი; 3 January 1862 – 21 February 1953) was a Georgian historian, archaeologist, public benefactor and Eastern Orthodox saint.

== Biography ==
Born in the village of Likhauri in the Guriantskiy prefecture of the Ozurgeti uezd, Tiflis Governorate to a local nobleman Svimon Takaishvili. He graduated from St. Petersburg University in 1887. From 1887 to 1917, he lectured on the history of Georgia at various prestigious schools in Tbilisi, including the Tbilisi Gymnasium for Nobility. During these years, he was actively involved in extensive scholarly activities and chaired, from 1907 to 1921, the Society of History and Ethnography of Georgia. Between 1907 and 1910, he organized a series of archaeological expeditions to the historic Georgian region of Tao-Klarjeti (now part of Turkey).

After the February Revolution, he engaged also in politics, taking part in the establishment of the National Democratic Party of Georgia in 1917 and being elected to a post of Deputy Chairman in the Constituent Assembly of the Democratic Republic of Georgia from 1919 to 1921.

== Georgian national treasury ==
In 1917 he was among the founders and professors of the Tbilisi State University (TSU). He lost his tenure both in the parliament and at the TSU in 1921, when Bolshevik Russia's 11th Red Army put an end to Georgia's independence. He followed the Georgian government in their French exile, taking the Georgian national treasury – numerous precious pieces of Georgian material culture - with him to Europe.

The treasury, filling 39 immense boxes, was shipped to Marseille and placed in a bank depository. Subsequently, this precious cargo was transferred to one of the banks in Paris. Although the treasury was officially the property of the Georgian government-in-exile, it was actually Ekvtime Takaishvili who supervised this huge collection. In the early 1930s, Takaishvili won a lawsuit against Salome Obolenskaya, daughter of the last Mingrelian prince Niko Dadiani, who also laid claim to a part of the treasury taken from the former Dadiani Palace in Zugdidi, Georgia. Despite numerous attempts by various European museums to purchase portions of this treasury, and extreme economic hardship, Takaishvili never sold a single piece of the priceless collection to live on and guarded it until 1933, when the League of Nations recognized the Soviet Union; the Georgian embassy in Paris was abolished and transformed into the "Georgian Office". The treasury passed into the possession of the French state. In 1935 Takaishvili urged the French government to hand the collections to Georgia, but it was not until the end of the World War II when he was able, in November 1944, to attract the attention of the Soviet ambassador Aleksandr Bogomolov to the fate of the Georgian treasury. Joseph Stalin's good relations with General Charles de Gaulle enabled Takaishvili to bring the treasury back to Georgia. However, Takaishvili had to spend his long days in Tbilisi under house arrest, seemingly considered to be too old to be imprisoned.

On 21 February 1953 Takaishvili died of a heart attack.

== Legacy ==
He was an author of numerous scholarly works on the history and archaeology of Georgia and the Caucasus which are of special value even today. In Tbilisi, Tbilisi Second Gymnasium has been named after him.

Saint Euthymius (Takaishvili)

Man of God
- Born: 3 January 1863; Likhauri, Ozurgeti uezd, Tiflis Governorate, Russian Empire
- Died: 21 February 1953; Tbilisi, Georgian SSR, Soviet Union
- Cause of death: Heart attack
- Honored in: Eastern Orthodox Church
- Canonized: 17 October 2002 by the Holy Synod of the Georgian Orthodox Church
- Feast: 3 January

In 2013 he was posthumously awarded the title and Order of National Hero of Georgia. Takaishvili was originally buried in the Didube Pantheon. In 2002, his remains were transferred to the Mtatsminda Pantheon.

=== Veneration ===
Takaishvili was canonised as a saint in 2002 by the Holy Synod of the Georgian Orthodox Church, with the title of 'Man of God'.
