= Rostom Gurieli =

Prince of Guria (r. 1534–1564)

Prince of Guria
- Reign: 1534–1564
- Predecessor: Mamia I Gurieli
- Successor: George II Gurieli
- Died: 1564
- Spouse: Tinatin; Tamar
- Issue Among others: George II Gurieli
- House: Gurieli
- Father: Mamia I Gurieli
- Mother: Ketevan
- Religion: Georgian Orthodox Church (Catholicate of Abkhazia)

Rostom Gurieli (Georgian: როსტომ გურიელი; died 1564), of the House of Gurieli, was Prince of Guria from 1534 until his death in 1564. Alongside his royal suzerain, Bagrat III of Imereti, Rostom fought against the expanding Ottoman Empire to which he lost parts of his principality. Rostom's relations with Bagrat III subsequently deteriorated over his support to the king's defiant vassal, Levan I Dadiani.

== Accession ==
Rostom was a son of Mamia I Gurieli by his wife Ketevan. In 1533, Mamia was taken captive during his disastrous expedition against the Circassians in which Rostom's brother George was killed. Rostom had to ransom his father, on whose death he succeeded as Prince of Guria a year later. By that time, Guria, a principality on Georgia's southwestern Black Sea coast, had been menaced by the resurgent Ottoman Empire, then being in war with Safavid Iran over hegemony in the Caucasus. Rostom stood by the side of his official royal suzerain, King Bagrat III of Imereti, in his struggle against the Ottoman encroachment.

== Ottoman wars ==
In 1535, Rostom joined forces with Bagrat in an invasion of the Samtskhe-Saatabago, ruled by the pro-Ottoman Atabeg Qvarqvare III Jaqeli. At the battle of Murjakheti, the atabag was defeated, captured by Gurieli's cup-bearer Isak Artumeladze, and eventually delivered to Bagrat. Qvarqvare died in prison, while Rostom was awarded his share of Samtskhe: Adjara and Chaneti, long sought after by the Gurieli dynasty. The Ottomans retaliated with a major invasion: Bagrat and Rostom were victorious at Karagak in 1543, but decisively defeated, in 1545, at Sokhoista, where Rostom's son Kaikhosro was killed.

In 1547, the Ottoman military imposed a blockade of Guria's coastline and occupied the maritime settlements of Gonio and Batumi. Rostom appealed for help to Bagrat of Imereti and Levan I Dadiani, Prince of Mingrelia. However, the king of Imereti, indignant at Rostom's earlier decline of a combined attack on Mingrelia, disrupted the nascent Dadiani–Gurieli accord. Left to his own devices, Rostom attacked, pushed the Ottoman forces beyond the Chorokhi and forced them to evacuate Batumi, but he failed to prevent the loss of Adjara and Chaneti; the Gonio fortress became an important Ottoman outpost in southwestern Georgia. Rostom died in 1564 and was buried at the Shemokmedi Monastery. He was succeeded by his son, George II Gurieli.

== Family ==
Rostom Gurieli was married twice. His first marriage was to Princess Tinatin (fl. 1534), a member of the Imeretian royal family, and his second was to a certain Tamar (fl. 1562). He had the following children:

- Kaikhosro (died 1545), killed at the Battle of Sokhoista;
- George II Gurieli (died 1600), Prince of Guria (r. 1564–1583, 1587–1600);
- Khosrotang;
- Elene (fl. 1571–1604), who married Prince Constantine, son of Bagrat III of Imereti;
- An unnamed daughter, the first wife of George III Dadiani;
- Rodam, who married Mzetchabuk, son of Kaikhosro II Jaqeli, in November 1570;
- An unnamed daughter, who married Mamia IV Dadiani.

According to the Russian historian Stanislav Dumin, Rostom may also have been the father of Vakhtang I Gurieli, a member of the Gurieli family of unknown ancestry.

== Bibliography ==
- Chkhataraishvili, Kveli (1959). გურიის სამთავრო : პოლიტიკური და სოციალურ-ეკონომიური ისტორიის ნარკვევი (in Georgian).

Rostom Gurieli House of Gurieli
Regnal titles
Preceded by Mamia I Gurieli	Prince of Guria; 1534–1564	Succeeded by George II Gurieli
