= Malakia II (Catholicos of Abkhazia) =

Catholicos of Abkhazia (died 1639)

Malakia

Catholicos of Abkhazia
- Tenure: 1619–1639
- Predecessor: Euthymius I Sakvarelidze
- Successor: Gregory I

Prince of Guria
- Reign: 1625–1639
- Predecessor: Simon II Gurieli
- Predecessor: Vakhtang II Gurieli
- Born: 1577
- Died: 1639 (aged 61–62)
- Georgian: მალაქია
- House: Gurieli
- Father: George II Gurieli
- Mother: Elene
- Religion: Catholicate of Abkhazia

Malakia II (Georgian: მალაქია II; 1577–1639) was Catholicos of Abkhazia (western Georgia) from 1619 to 1639 and, under the name Malakia I Gurieli, Prince of Guria from 1625 to 1639. He was the son of the Gurian prince George II Gurieli. A prominent state and church figure, he organized the affairs of Georgia, built and decorated numerous churches and monasteries, patronized Catholic missionaries and Georgian cultural figures, and initiated the compilation of the Great Book of Catholicosate Peasants of Abkhazia. He also assisted the kings of Kartli and Kakheti, as well as Giorgi Saakadze, in their struggle against Safavid Iran.
