= Manuchar (son of Levan III Dadiani) =

Georgian prince

Manuchar (c. 1665–1680) was a Georgian prince of the House of Dadiani. The son of Levan III Dadiani, he became involved in the dynastic struggles of western Georgia during his youth and was ultimately killed while held at the court of George III Gurieli.

== Biography ==
Manuchar was the son of Levan III Dadiani, Prince of Mingrelia and his second wife, Tinatin, sister of Bagrat IV of Imereti. At the age of seven, he was sent in Kartli to be married or betrothed, around 1672, to Princess Darejan, a daughter of Archil II and granddaughter of Vakhtang V of Kartli, who was of the same age. Fearing an alliance between Mingrelia and Kartli, Bagrat V reportedly informed Manuchar's attendants that Vakhtang V intended to send the prince as a prisoner to the shah of Iran. The attendants, alarmed by this information, removed the boy from Kartli and returned him to Mingrelia to his father.

Following an alliance between Manuchar's father and Guria, the prince was sent as a hostage to the court of George III Gurieli. According to Cyril Toumanoff, Manuchar was married to Gurieli's daughter. In 1680, after the death of Levan III, the ruler of Guria laid claim to the throne of Mingrelia. The Megrelians fortified their strongholds and demanded the return of Manuchar, declaring that they would not surrender their fortresses and lands while he remained alive. In response, Gurieli ordered the killing of the young Dadiani, believing that this would facilitate his conquest of Mingrelia. The Megrelians subsequently declared Gurieli the object of a blood feud and resisted his advance, ultimately forcing him to retreat.

== Bibliography ==
- Brosset, Marie-Félicité (1856). Histoire de la Georgie depuis l'antiquite jusqu'au 19. siecle (in French). Vol. 5. l'acad. Imper. des sciences.
