= Shemokmedi =

Shemokmedi შემოქმედი
- Village
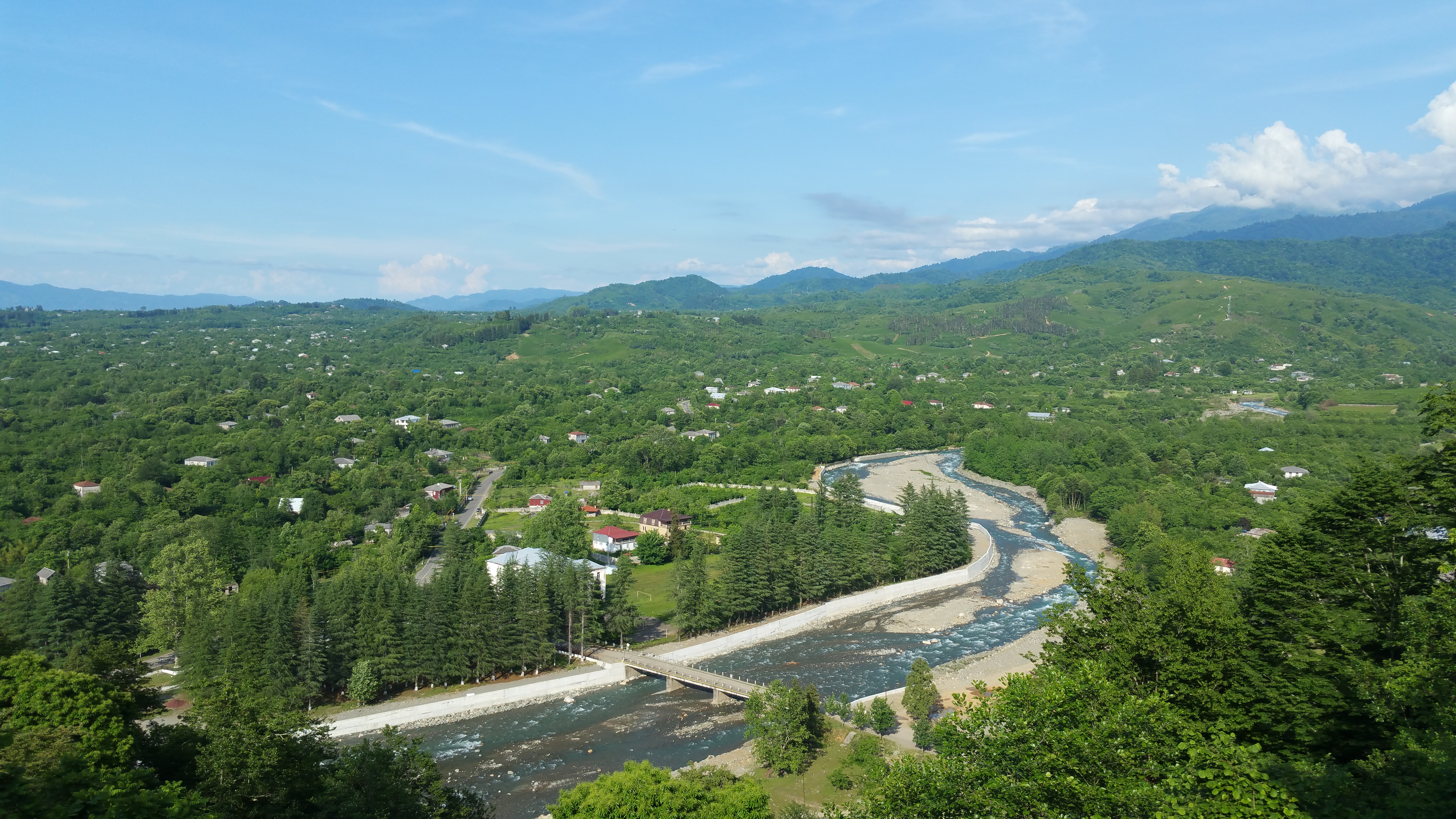
- View of the village from Shemokmedi Monastery
- Interactive map of Shemokmedi
- Location of Shemokmedi Shemokmedi (Guria)
- Coordinates: 41°54′31″N 42°04′06″E
- Country: Georgia
- Region: Guria
- Municipality: Ozurgeti
- Elevation: 190 m (620 ft)

Population (2014)
  - Total: 1,322
- Time zone: UTC+4 (Georgian Time)

Shemokmedi (Georgian: შემოქმედი) is a village in the Ozurgeti Municipality, Guria, Georgia. It is located in western Georgia, on the Bzhuzhi river, at elevation of 190 m above sea level, 7 km east of the city of Ozurgeti. The village is home to the late medieval Shemokmedi Monastery.

== History ==
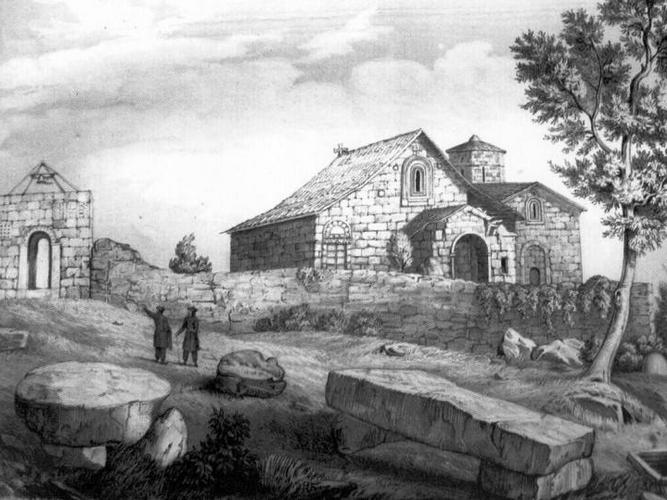
The Shemokmedi monastery in the 1830s.

Archaeological reconnaissance works conducted at Shemokmedi from 1991 to 1994 yielded fragments of pottery characteristic of the Kura–Araxes culture, suggesting that the area had already been inhabited in the Early Bronze Age.

The recorded history of Shemokmedi is inextricably bound to the monastery complex which sits on a small hill overlooking the village. The monastery was founded by the Gurieli family, rulers of the Principality of Guria, in the 15th century as a seat of a Georgian Orthodox bishop. Furthermore, it was a safe-house of church treasures and, by the late 19th century, had accumulated an extensive collection of various objects from other Georgian monasteries. At that time, the locale was fortified, housing a castle owned by the Gurieli.

During the 1819–1820 uprising in Imereti and Guria against the Imperial Russian rule, the Shemokmedi castle, then in possession of Prince Kaikhosro Gurieli, was the principal rebel stronghold in Guria. It was there that, in April 1820, the Gurians put the captured Russian interim governor of Imereti, Colonel Puzyrevsky, to death and dashed an attempt by the Russian punitive force to attack the castle. On 24 July 1820, the Russian general Aleksey Velyaminov stormed and captured Shemokmedi. The castle, dubbed by the Russian officials "an abode of brigandage", was razed to the ground in an act of revenge; houses were all burned down and farmlands and vineyards were destroyed to punish the locals with "extreme poverty".

== Population ==
As of the 2014 national census, Shemokmedi had a population of 1,322. Most of them (99.5%) are ethnic Georgians.

Population	2002 census	2014 census
Total	1,608	1,322

== People from Shemokmedi ==
- Ivan Dumbadze (1851–1916), an Imperial Russian general and official.
- Vladimir Nemirovich-Danchenko (1858–1943), a Russian theatre director and writer.
- Filipp Makharadze (1868–1941), a Georgian Bolshevik politician.
- Varlam Simonishvili (1888–1950), a Georgian folk singer.
- Rezo Esadze (born 1934), a Georgian film director and actor.
