= Kakhaber I Gurieli =

Kakhaber Gurieli (Georgian: კახაბერ გურიელი, fl. 1352) was a member of the House of Dadiani and eristavi ("duke") of Guria in western Georgia in the latter half of the 14th century. He is the first known ruler of Guria to be styled as Gurieli.

Kakhaber was a younger son of Giorgi II Dadiani (died 1384), eristavi of Odishi, and brother to Giorgi's successor Vameq I Dadiani. Kakhaber, as the first Gurieli, was identified by the Georgian historian Dimitri Bakradze based on a now-lost icon inscription from 1352, which credited him, along with his wife Anna, with building the Likhauri Church in Guria. Thus, at that time, Guria appears to have been a fief of the secundogeniture of the Dadiani. Kakhaber is also mentioned as eristavi of the Svans, whence the Vardanisdze, forefathers of the Dadiani-Gurieli dynasts, stemmed.

Kakhaber can be the unnamed Vardanisdze of Prince Vakhushti of Kartli's chronicle, who was deprived of his Svan lands by King Bagrat V of Georgia and recompensed with Guria after the Svans had attacked and burned down the royal city of Kutaisi in 1361. It is also possible that Kakhaber is the "archon" of Guria, whom the contemporaneous Trapezuntine chronicler Michael Panaretos witnessed, on 6 August 1372, offering a proskynesis to his royal suzerain during the meeting of Alexios III of Trebizond with Bagrat V of Georgia at the Black Sea town of Batumi.

Kakhaber's son and possible successor was Giorgi Gurieli, who is known, along with his wife Elene, from an inscription from the Likhauri church dated to 1422, as well as undated inscriptions mentioning his sons—Mamia, his possible successor as Duke of Guria, and Kaikubad.

Kakhaber I Gurieli House of Gurieli
Regnal titles
Preceded by Office established	Duke of Guria fl. 1352	Succeeded by Giorgi Gurieli
