= Likhauri church =

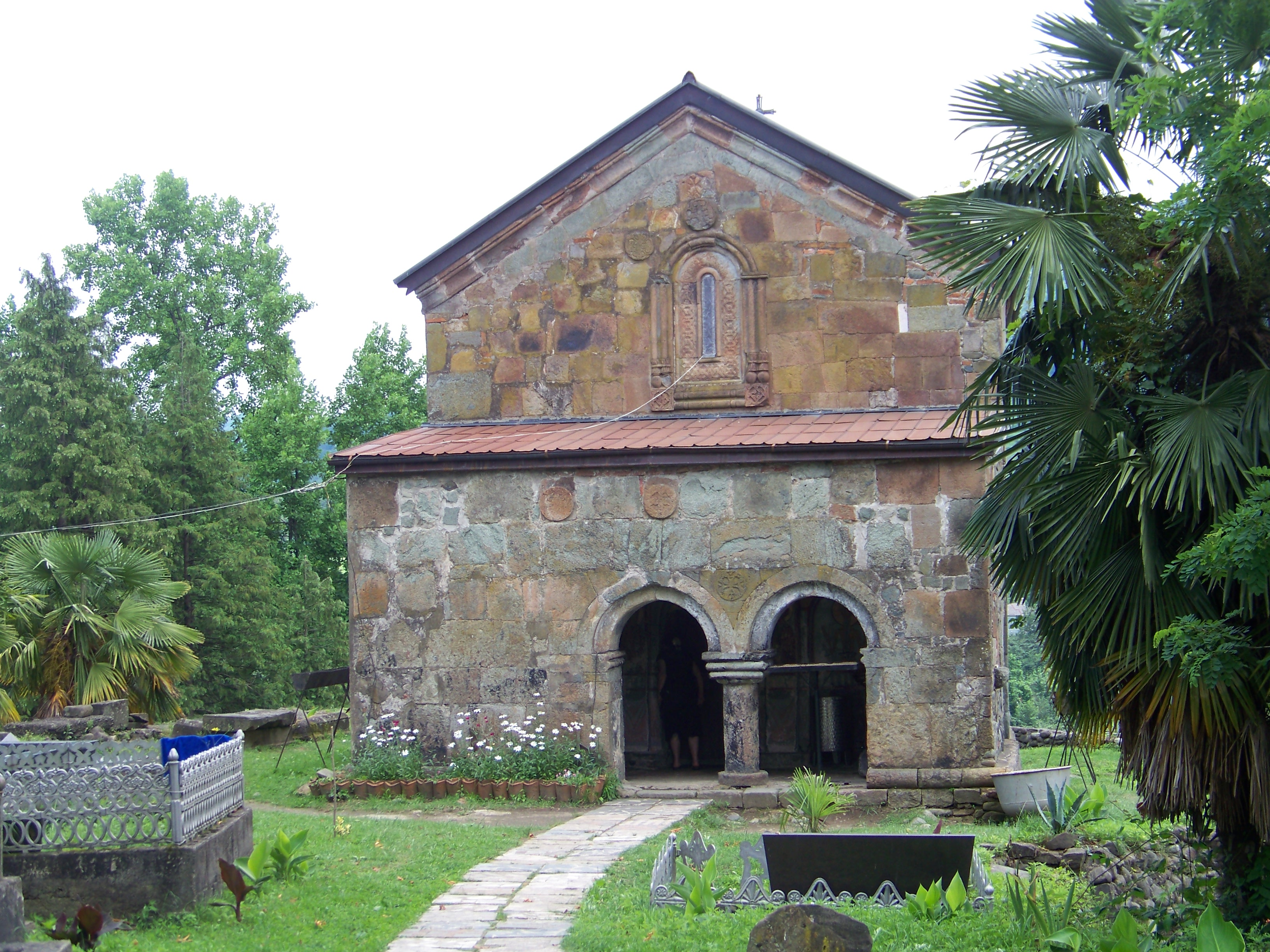
- Likhauri church

- Location within Guria Location within Georgia

Religion
- Affiliation: Georgian Orthodox Church
- District: Ozurgeti Municipality
- Region: Caucasus
- Status: Active

Location
- Location: Likhauri, Ozurgeti Municipality, Georgia
- Coordinates: 41°53′00″N 42°00′42″E

Architecture
- Style: Georgian; Church

The Likhauri Church is a Georgian Orthodox Church at the Ozurgeti Municipality in the Guria region, Georgia. It was built in the 12th century.

== History ==
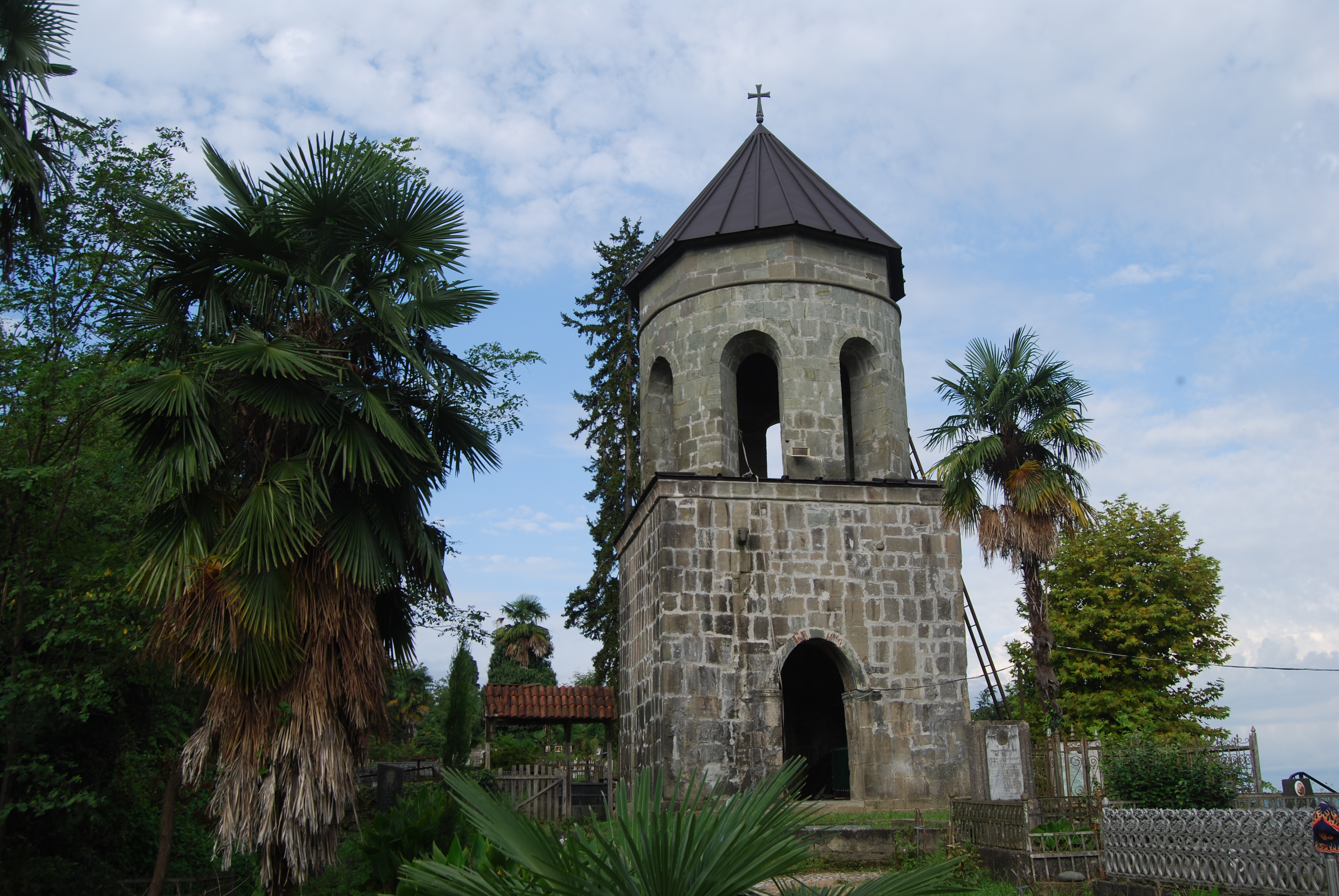
Bell Tower.

The Likhauri church was built in 1352 by the Kajaberi dynasty of Guria. The church is located in the center of the town of Likhauri. Near the church there is an independent bell tower that, like the church, is made of carved stone. On one of the walls of the bell tower there is an inscription in Georgian language. On the eastern wall of the church there is a window richly decorated with Georgian ornaments, and on the western wall is a portal. The south facade was restored with stone and bricks. The rehabilitation works were carried out by the patronage of Gorje IV Gurieli and Queen Khvaremze.

In 2010, a reinforced concrete wall was built on the territory of the Likhauri church to protect the monument in a natural event.

== Restoration ==
The church was painted entirely with fresco paintings, its execution dates back to the 15th and 16th centuries. The murals of Likhura were torn off in the first half of the 1990s when the church was painted again. Its heavily damaged fragments are stored in the Tbilisi Academy of Art and granted the status of cultural heritage object. Of the paintings, only two remain in the temple.

== Bibliography ==
- Tavadze G. More attention to the cultural monuments of Guria, "The friend of the monument", X-XI, 1967
- Dimitri Bakradze, "Archaeological trip in Guria and Adjara" - Batumi, "Soviet Adjara", 1987
- Tea Kartvelishvili, "Guria Episcopacies" pp. 66–69 - "ARRANUJI", Tbilisi, 2006 ISBN 99940-11-89-8
