= Mamia V Gurieli =

Prince of Guria

Prince of Guria
- Reign: 1809–1826
- Predecessor: Kaikhosro IV Gurieli
- Successor: David Gurieli
- Born: 1789
- Died: 21 November 1826 (aged 36–37)
- Spouse: Sophia Tsulukidze (m. 1814)
- Issue: Ekaterina; David Gurieli; Kochibrola; Sophia; Terezia
- House: Gurieli
- Father: Simon III Gurieli
- Mother: Marine Tsereteli
- Religion: Georgian Orthodox Church

Mamia V Gurieli (Georgian: მამია V გურიელი; 1789 – 21 November 1826), of the House of Gurieli, was Prince of Guria from 1809 to 1826. Mamia was a Europeanizing ruler, presiding over efforts to reform Guria's administration and education. Rejecting the vestiges of Ottoman overlordship, he made Guria an autonomous subject of the Russian Empire in 1810 and remained steadfast in allegiance to the new order even when his uncle Kaikhosro and leading nobles of Guria rose in arms against the Russian hegemony in 1820. Mamia's loyalty, even it was timidly displayed during a pacification campaign in Guria, was appreciated by the Russian government. Mamia himself grew increasingly depressed after the uprising and died in 1826, leaving his son David to become the last titular Prince of Guria.

== Early life ==
Mamia was the third child and only son of Simon III Gurieli, Prince-regnant of Guria, and Princess Marine née Tsereteli. At the time of Simon's death in 1792, Mamia was three years old and the government of Guria was taken over by Simon's younger brother Vakhtang III Gurieli. The princess-dowager Marine, who felt persecuted by Vakhtang, sought and gained protection from the next younger brother, Kaikhosro, who deposed Vakhtang in 1797, declared the boy-prince Mamia as Guria's next ruler and himself a regent until Mamia was of age to take power. During the years of his regency, Kaikhosro brought a degree of stability to Guria and effected rapprochement with the expanding Russian Empire, much to the ire of the Ottoman government, which claimed suzerainty over all of western Georgia.

== Joining Russia ==
In 1809, Kaikhosro retired from the government and ceded all ruling powers to Mamia. That same year, the Russo-Ottoman war brought hostilities to the borders of Guria; the Russian forces under General Dimitri Orbeliani besieged the Ottoman stronghold of Poti, on the Black Sea, immediately north of Guria. Initially reluctant to overtly join the Russians, Mamia kept correspondence with the Ottoman commanders, but he eventually rallied to the Russian cause and attacked the Ottoman defenders of Poti in their rear at Grigoleti, contributing to the Russian victory in November 1809. In March 1810, Mamia and the neighboring ruler Levan V Dadiani of Mingrelia joined the Russian army in its conquest of the western Georgian Kingdom of Imereti.

Shortly after the fall of Poti, Mamia went ahead with requesting a treaty with Russia. He took an oath of fealty to Tsar Alexander I at a ceremony in the village of Guriamta in April 1810 and received the Imperial diploma, confirming him as prince-regnant as a Russian subject, with symbols of investiture—a precious sabre and a flag with the coat of arms of the Russian Empire—on 8 April 1811. On this occasion, Mamia was also awarded the Order of St. Anna, 1st Class, and the rank of major-general, while his mother Marina was granted an annual pension of 200 chervonets.

Mamia took a keen interest in transforming and developing administration and economy and improving education in his small state, whose population was around 6,000 families. A foreign observer described him as "very desirous of adopting European customs and habits". Around 1817, he gave some lands and families of serfs to James Patrick Montague Marr, a Scotsman, on condition of his introducing the cultivation of indigo. After felling Guria's timber, Marr settled down in old age with a Gurian peasant girl and fathered Nicholas Marr, a historian and linguist of international fame. Curiously, Mamia also employed a band of wandering German rope-dancers to perform three times a week for the amusement of his court.

== 1820 rebellion ==
In March 1820, Mamia Gurieli's relations with the Russian Empire was put to a test; an uprising in Imereti against the Russian hegemony found its echo in Guria and involved Mamia's Imeretian brother-in-law Ivane Abashidze and his uncle and former caretaker Kaikhosro Gurieli as principal leaders. As the Russian troops poured into the principality, Mamia maintained loyalty to the empire and tried, with mixed success, to dissuade his nobles from joining the rebellion, but he avoided being directly involved in counter-insurgency operations and tried to bring the estates confiscated by the Russian military from the rebel nobles under his control. The Russian viceroy of the Caucasus, General Aleksey Yermolov, refused the Gurian ruler's request in this regard because what the rebellious nobles had done, Yermolov claimed, had tarnished Mamia's honor. Yet, the viceroy was appreciative of Mamia's loyalty to which he attributed the Russian success in containing the rebellion. In September 1820, Gurieli met the Russian commander in Guria, General Velyaminov, at a military camp at Chakhatauri and was assured of the imperial government’s benevolence towards him.

Soon after the 1820 events, Mamia succumbed to depression and died at Ozurgeti on 21 November 1826, leaving behind his two-year-old son David as his successor.

== Family ==
Mamia Gurieli married, c. 1814, the Imeretian princess Sophia Tsulukidze (died 7 September 1829), who assumed regency of Mamia's heir David on her husband's death in 1826. She defected the Russian Empire during the Ottoman war of 1828–1829, bringing about the loss of Guria's self-rule and direct Russian annexation on 7 September 1829. The couple had five children, four daughters and a son. After Sophia's death in exile, Mamia's children were amnestied and resettled by the Russian government to Saint Petersburg. On 20 January 1843, the surviving two daughters, Ekaterina and Terezia, were granted the style of Serene Highness.

Mamia's children were:

- Princess Ekaterina (1815–1880); she married, in June 1834, the Mingrelian prince Levan Chichua (died 1834), only to become a widow two months later.
- Prince David (1818 – 23 August 1839), last titular Prince of Guria (r. 1826–1829). He died as a Russian army officer fighting against the Caucasian mountaineers at Akhulgo.
- Princess Kochibrola (born 1820);
- Princess Sophia (1823 – 15 May 1840);
- Princess Terezia (1825 – 24 March 1871), an Imperial lady-in-waiting. She married, in 1843, General Prince Grigol Dadiani.

== Notes ==
Mamia V Gurieli House of Gurieli
Regnal titles
Preceded by Kaikhosro IV Gurieli	Prince of Guria; 1809–1826	Succeeded by David Gurieli
