= Archbishop of Shemokmedi =

List of Orthodox Archbishops of Shemokmedi of the Georgian Orthodox and Apostolic Church, centered on the Shemokmedi Monastery in Guria:

- Ioseb (present)
