= Asat Grigolisdze =

Asat Grigolisdze (Georgian: ასათ გრიგოლისძე) was a 12th-century Georgian noble (didebuli) and eristavi ("duke") of Hereti in eastern Georgia. Asat, son of Grigol, who took the post by force from Saghir Kolonkelisdze; a little later he handed it over to his son, Grigol, because he obtained for himself Arishiani (frontier region in eastern Georgia), and the right to sit on a cushion. During a revolt of treasurer Qutlu Arslan, who led a group of nobles and wealthy citizens in a struggle to limit the royal authority in 1191, Asat was one of the few nobles who remained loyal to the Queen Tamar. Following the invitation of Asat, Tamar undertook the great and glorious march to the countries below Ganja and Beylagan, then over the Araxes up to the mountain of Ararat.
