= Machutadze =

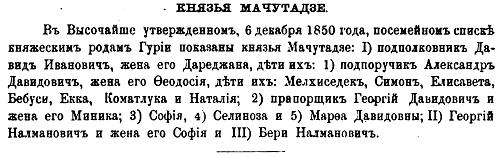
Register of Princes Machutadze in the Russian nobility book from 1892

The House of Machutadze (Georgian: მაჭუტაძე) was a Georgian noble family known from 1412/1442 in the Principality of Guria where they served as Mayors of the Palace at the Gurieli court. Notably, the family's prominence extended to religious leadership when Onopre Machutadze was appointed Father Superior of the David Gareja monastery complex in 1690, leading a major resurrection and architectural restoration of the site after previous devastating foreign invasions.

== History ==
Under the Russian rule, the family was received among the Russian nobility and were awarded with the title of Knyaz of the Russian Empire in 1850.
