= George I Gurieli =

Prince of Guria
- Reign: 1483–1512
- Predecessor: Kakhaber II Gurieli
- Successor: Mamia I Gurieli
- Died: 1512
- Issue: Mamia I Gurieli
- House: Gurieli
- Father: Kakhaber II Gurieli
- Mother: Anna
- Religion: Georgian Orthodox Church (Catholicate of Abkhazia)

George I Gurieli (Georgian: გიორგი I გურიელი; died 1512), of the House of Gurieli, was eristavi ("duke") and then mtavari ("prince") of Guria from 1483 until his death in 1512.

== Biography ==
George I Gurieli was a son of Kakhaber II Gurieli by his wife Anna and his successor as the ruler of Guria, a semi-independent polity which emerged in the process of dissolution of the Kingdom of Georgia, finalized in 1491. As a result, the ruler of Guria became a prince-regnant (mtavari), formally a vassal of the King of Imereti. George Gurieli remained more or less loyal to his royal suzerains, Alexander II and Bagrat III, and held the rank of Grand Master of the Household (msakhurtukhutsesi) at the court of Imereti. Around 1511, he lost to Mzetchabuk Jaqeli, Prince of Samtskhe, the Black Sea provinces of Adjara and Chaneti, which his father had gained from Mzetchabuk's predecessor. Mzetchabuk's charter, granting the rights over the Zarzma Monastery to the see of Atskuri, mentions territorial acquisition from the Gurieli.

George Gurieli died in 1512. He was succeeded, with the blessing of King Bagrat III, by his son Mamia I.

== Sources ==
George I Gurieli House of Gurieli
Regnal titles
Preceded by Kakhaber II Gurieli	Duke/Prince of Guria; 1483–1512	Succeeded by Mamia I Gurieli
