= Lake Paliastomi =

Lake near Poti, Georgia

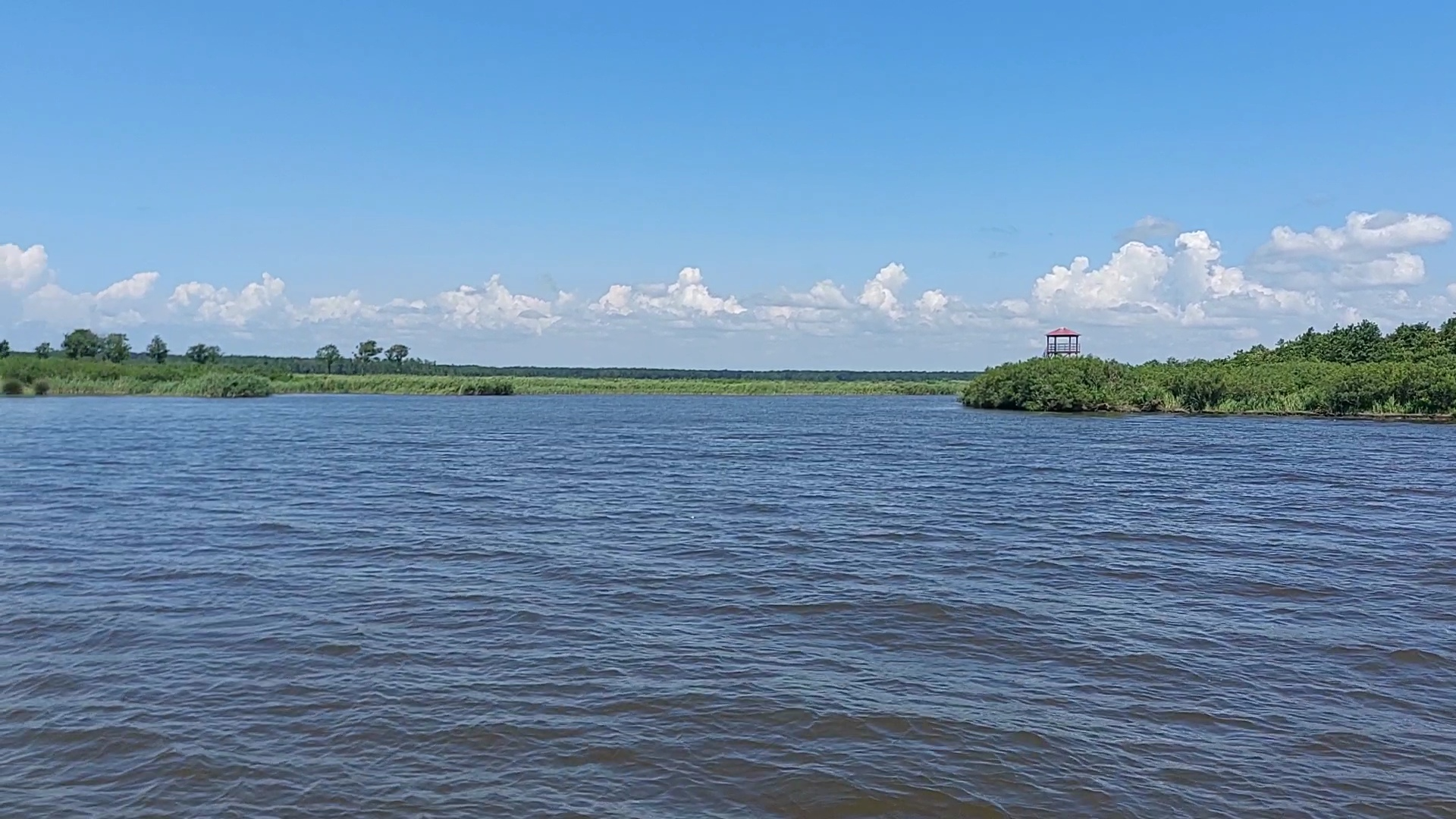

- Location within Samegrelo-Zemo Svaneti Location within Georgia
- Interactive map of Lake Paliastomi
- Coordinates: 42°7′30″N 41°43′47″E
- Basin countries: Georgia
- Surface area: 17.3 km^{2} (6.7 sq mi)
- Average depth: 2.6 m (8 ft 6 in)
- Max. depth: 6 m (20 ft)
- Frozen: rarely
- Settlements: Poti

Lake Paliastomi (Georgian: პალიასტომი, also transliterated as Palaeostomi, ″ancient mouth / outlet″ in greek) is a small lake near the city of Poti, Georgia, connected to the Black Sea by a narrow channel. Its surface area is 17.3 km^{2} and the mean depth is 2.6 m. Some ancient pieces of Colchis have been found near and in the lake by archaeologists. It is also an important fishery site.

The lake is included within the boundaries of the Kolkheti National Park.
