= House of Vardanisdze =

The House of Vardanisdze (Georgian: ვარდანისძე) was an aristocratic family in medieval Georgia, listed among the Great Nobles (didebuli) of the realm.

== History ==
The family is presumed to have branched off from the Marushisdze family, another eminent Georgian feudal clan, a hypothesis supported by the abundance of the name Marushiani in the Vardanisdze family. The first attested member and arguably a founder of the family is Vardan, eristavi of the Svans, in the latter half of the 11th century. The dignity of eristavi (or eristavt-eristavi) of the Svans was hereditary in his descendants later known as Vardanisdze (Vardan + -dze, "a son"). They also held various important posts at the Georgian royal court, including mechurchlet-ukhutsesi (Lord High Treasurer), msakhurt-ukhutsesi (Lord Great Chamberlain) and mandaturt-ukhutsesi (Lord High Mandator) of Likht-Imereti (i.e., west Georgia).

== Branches of the family ==
The family gave origin to two important branches, the Dadiani of Mingrelia, and the Gurieli of Guria while in Svaneti they were replaced by the House of Gelovani.
