= Likhauri =

Likhauri ლიხაური
- Village
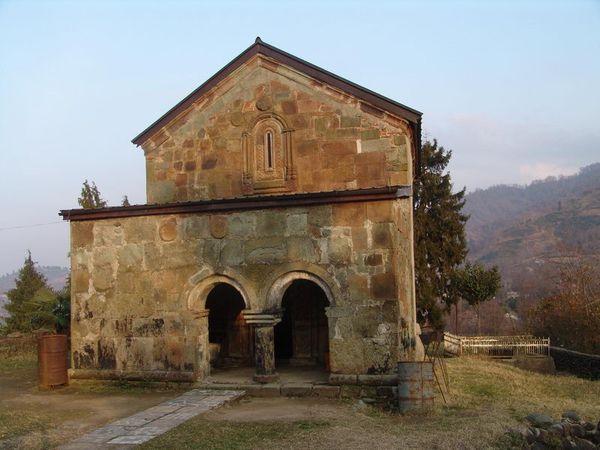
- Church in Likhauri

- Location within Georgia
- Coordinates: 41°52′50″N 42°00′20″E
- Country: Georgia
- Mkhare: Guria
- Municipality: Ozurgeti
- Elevation: 120 m (390 ft)

Population (2014)
  - Total: 952
- Time zone: UTC+4 (Georgian Time)

Likhauri (Georgian: ლიხაური) is a village in the Ozurgeti district of Guria in western Georgia.
