= House of Gurieli =

Georgian noble family

Gurieli გურიელი
- Nobility
- Coat of arms of the Gurieli royal dynasty
- Parent house: House of Vardanisdze
- Country: Georgia
- Titles: Principality of Guria

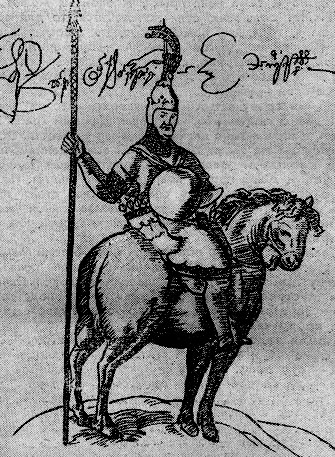
Prince Mamia Gurieli of Guria, 17th century. Painted by Don Christoforo de Castelli.

The House of Gurieli (Georgian: გურიელი) was a Georgian princely (mtavari) family and a ruling dynasty of dukes of the southwestern Georgian province of Guria, which was autonomous and later, for a few centuries, independent. A few ducal rulers of the dynasty also rose in the 17th-18th centuries to be kings of the whole western Caucasus in place of the hereditary Bagrationi kings of Imereti.

== History ==
Bearing a hereditary title for governors (Eristavi) of Guria since the mid-13th century, Gurieli (literally, "of Guria") was adopted as a dynastic name by the Vardanisdze family (ვარდანისძე), hereditary rulers of Svaneti (a highland province in western Georgia). The other notable branch of the Vardanisdze was the Dadiani (დადიანი) of Samegrelo. Both of these branches occasionally used double names: Gurieli-Dadiani or Dadiani-Gurieli.

The medieval Gurieli were vassals of the Georgian crown but, at the same time, seem to have paid some kind of homage (Greek: προσκύνησις) to the rulers of the neighboring Empire of Trebizond, whose last emperor, David Komnenos (reigned from 1459 to 1461), is documented as having been 'gambros' of Mamia Vardanisdze-Gurieli (c. 1450 - 69), which is interpreted to mean that Mamia married his daughter or sister or close kinswoman. If the couple had issue, possibly the subsequent ruler Kakhaber (1469–83), the latter-day Gurieli would descend from several Byzantine and Trapezuntine emperors.

In the 1460s, when the power of the Bagrationi dynasty of Georgia was on the decline, the Gurieli pursued a policy of separation and became virtually (formally acknowledged at times) independent rulers (mtavari) of the Principality of Guria in the mid-16th century, but were forced to pay tribute to the Ottoman Empire, nominally recognizing also the authority of the princes of Mingrelia and kings of Imereti. Throughout the following two centuries, the politics of the Gurieli dynasty were dominated by conflicts with the neighboring Georgian rulers, Ottoman encroachment, and repeated occasions of civil strife and palace coups.

In the 17th and 18th centuries, as many as four Gurieli rulers managed to be chosen kings of the whole Western Caucasus in place of hereditary Bagrationi kings of Imereti. Gurieli kings however are usually characterized as usurpers, or as counter-monarchs of a rival dynasty.

On several occasions powerful neighbors also managed to divert the rule of Guria to members of rival branches of the Gurieli dynasty.

Having accepted Imperial Russian sovereignty in 1810, the dynasty continued to enjoy some autonomy in their home affairs until 1829, when the Russian authorities deposed Prince David, the last Gurieli, and annexed the Principality of Guria. With the death of David in 1839, his cousin David Gurieli (1802–1856), and his descendants (Russian: Гуриели, Гуриеловы) were confirmed in the Russian nobility with the princely title of (knyaz) by the Emperor's ukase of 1850.

== Princes-regnant of Guria ==
- c. 1385–1410 – Kakhaber I; son of George II Dadiani; eristavi of Guria and Svaneti
- c. 1410–1430 – George I; son of Kakhaber I
- c. 1430–1450 – Mamia I; son of George I
- c. 1450–1469 – Mamia II; son of Liparit I Dadiani
- 1469–1483 – Kakhaber II; possibly son of Mamia II by his Trapezuntine wife
- 1483–1512 – George I (II); son of Kakhaber II; sovereign prince from 1491
- 1512–1534 – Mamia I (III); son of George I
- 1534–1564 – Rostom; son of Mamia I
- 1564–1583 – George II (III); son of Rostom; deposed
- 1583–1587 – Vakhtang I; son of Rostom
- 1587–1600 – George II (III); restored
- 1600–1625 – Mamia II (IV); son of George II
- 1625 – Simon II; son of Mamia II; deposed, died after 1672
- 1625–1639 – Malakia I; son of George II
- 1639–1640 – Vakhtang II; son of George II
- 1640–1658 – Kaikhosro I (III); son of Vakhtang I
- 1659–1668 – Demetrius; son of Simon I; deposed, died 1668
- 1669–1684 – George III (IV); son of Kaikhosro I
- 1684–1685 – Malakia II; son of Kaikhosro I; deposed
- 1685–1689 – Kaikhosro II (IV); son of George III
- 1689 – Malakia II; restored; deposed, died after 1689
- 1689–1712 – Mamia III (V); son of George III; deposed
- 1712 – George IV (V); son of Mamia III; deposed
- 1712–1714 – Mamia III (V); restored
- 1714–1716 – George IV (V); restored; deposed
- 1716–1717 – Kaikhosro III (V); son of Mamia III; deposed, died after 1751
- 1717–1726 – George IV (V); restored
- 1726–1756 – Mamia IV (VI); son of George IV; deposed, died 1778
- 1756–1758 – George V (VI); son of George IV; abdicated
- 1758–1765 – Mamia IV (VI); restored; deposed
- 1765–1771 – George V (VI); restored; deposed
- 1771–1776 – Mamia IV (VI); restored; abdicated
- 1776–1788 – George V (VI); restored; abdicated
- 1788–1792 – Simon III; son of George V; died 1792
- 1792–1797 – Vakhtang II; son of George V; deposed, died after 1814
- 1797–1809 – Kaikhosro IV (VI); son of George V; abdicated, died 1829
- 1809–1826 – Mamia V (VII); son of Simon III
- 1826–1829 – David; son of Mamia V; deposed, died 1839
  - Sophia, mother of David, regent 1826–1829
