= Catholicate of Abkhazia =

Former subdivision of the Georgian Orthodox Church

The Catholicate of Abkhazia (Georgian: აფხაზეთის საკათალიკოსო, romanized: apkhazetis sak'atalik'oso) was a subdivision of the Georgian Orthodox Church that functioned as an independent entity in western Georgia from the 1470s to 1814. It was headed by the Catholicos (later Catholicos Patriarch), officially styled as the Catholicos Patriarch of Imereti, Odishi, Ponto-Abkhaz-Guria, Racha-Lechkhum-Svaneti, Ossetians, Dvals, and all of the North. The residence of the Catholicoi was originally at Bichvinta (now Pitsunda) in Abkhazia, giving the Catholicate its name, but it was moved to the Gelati Monastery in Imereti in the late 16th century. In 1814, the office of the Catholicos of Abkhazia was abolished by the Russian Empire, which controlled the Georgian church until the restoration of its autocephaly in 1917.

== History ==
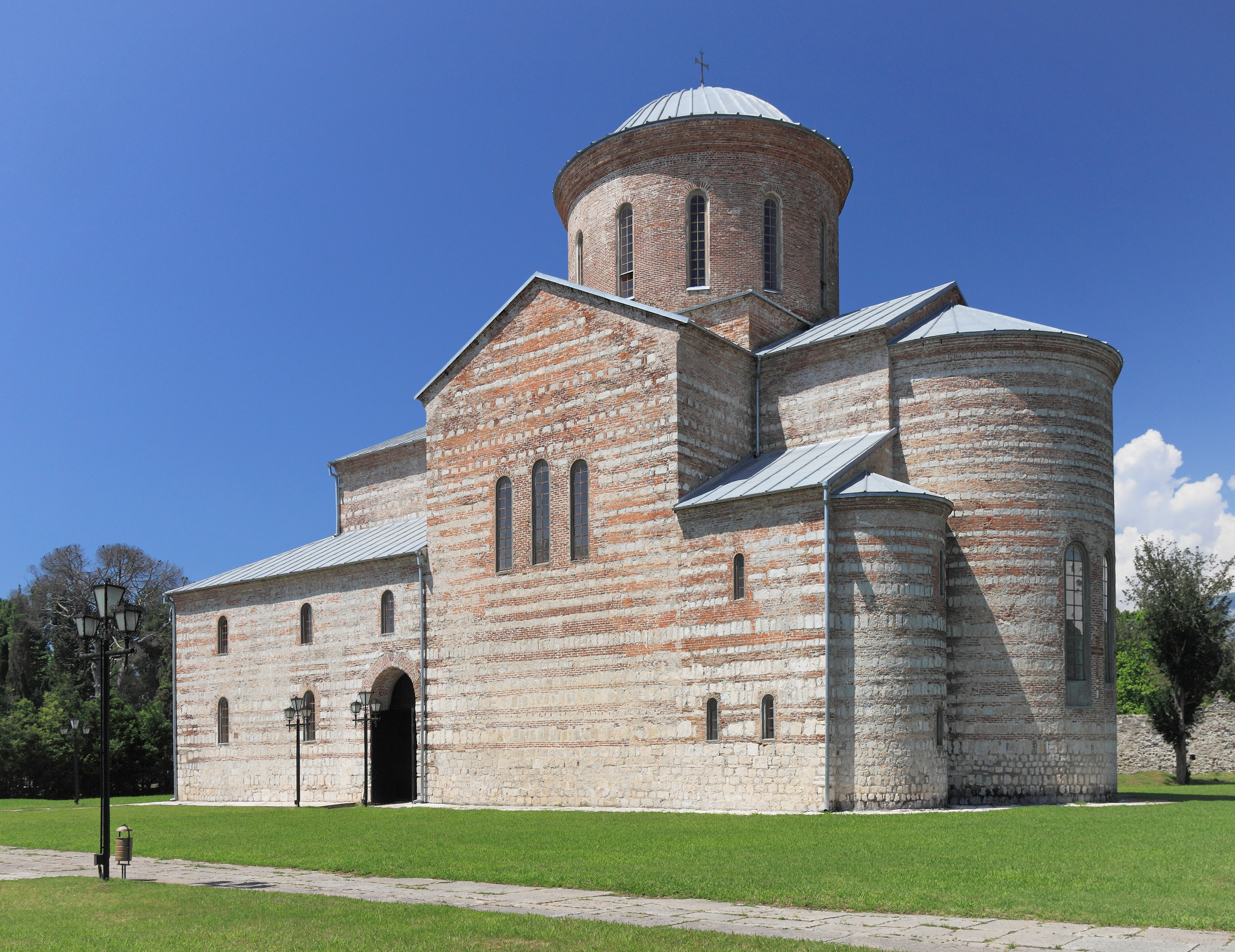
Bichvinta (Pitsunda) Cathedral, the earliest residence of the Catholicate of Abkhazia.

The exact date of the establishment of the Catholicate of Abkhazia is uncertain, with some scholars placing it in the 9th or 10th centuries. Around this time, Abkhazian bishoprics shifted allegiance from Constantinople to Mtskheta. The titular Catholicoi of Abkhazia are first mentioned in contemporary sources in the 11th century, though they likely did not enjoy full independence at that time. The first written account of the Catholicate dates to 1290, with some scholars attributing its foundation to the 13th century. By then, Mongol rule had divided Georgia into eastern and western parts, the latter being de facto independent from the Mongol Ilkhanid dynasty, to which Georgia was subject. The political independence of the western Georgian rulers, Kings of Imereti, may have contributed to the revival of the Catholicate.

From the 15th century, following Georgia's political fragmentation, the Catholicate of Abkhazia regained its independence. The kings of Imereti sought to establish their own church to reinforce their legitimacy, as the Georgian Orthodox Church's main residence in Mtskheta was located in territory controlled by their rivals.

This development is commonly associated with the consecration of Archbishop Joachime of Tsaish and Bedia as Catholicos of Abkhazia by Michael IV, the Patriarch of Antioch, during the reign of Bagrat VI (1463–1478). To justify the separation from Mtskheta, Michael issued a document titled The Law of Faith, stating that western and eastern Georgia had distinct histories of conversion and should therefore operate independently.

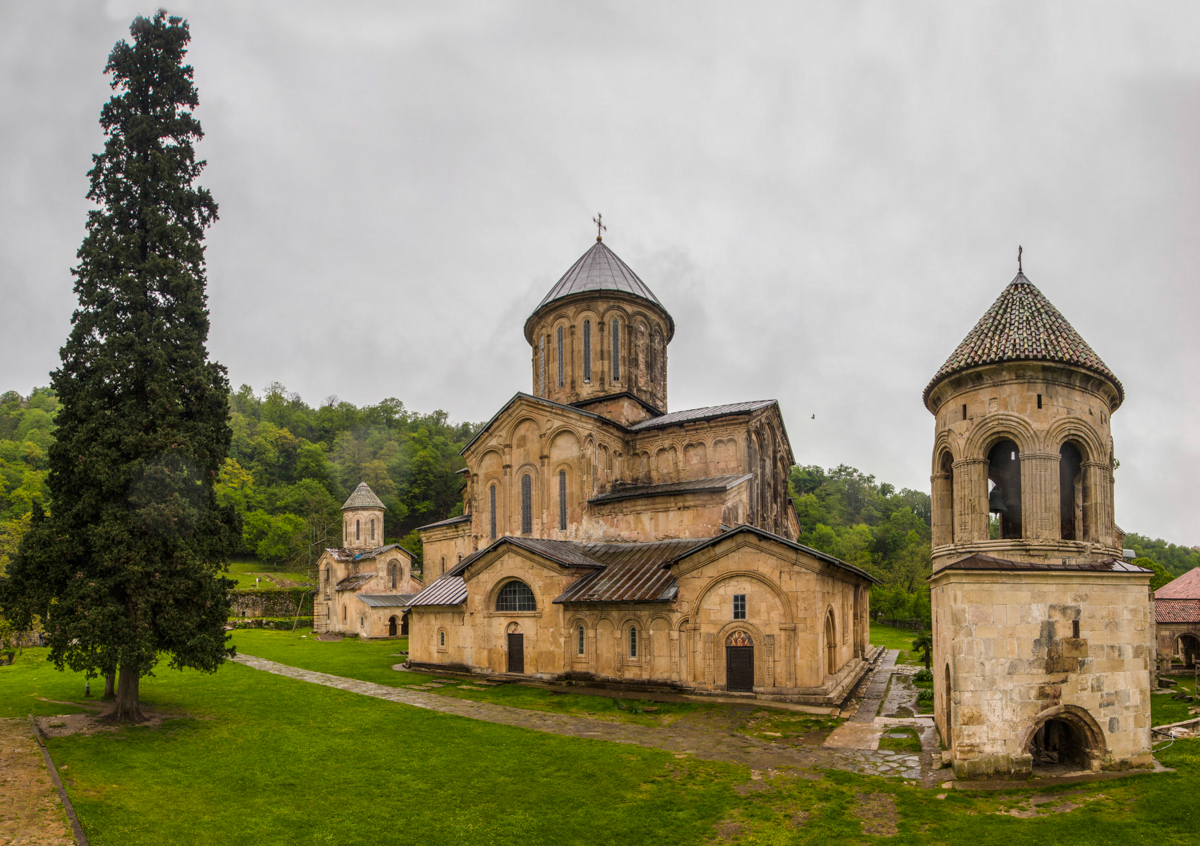
Gelati Monastery, the later seat of the Catholicoi of Abkhazia

The Catholicoi of Abkhazia thus became fully independent and later adopted the title of Patriarch. Their spiritual jurisdiction extended over the Kingdom of Imereti and its vassal principalities: Guria, Mingrelia, Svaneti, and Abkhazia. They considered themselves vicars of St. Andrew, who, according to medieval Georgian tradition, preached Christianity in western Georgia, known to Classical authors as Colchis. At various periods, the Catholicate was divided into several dioceses (eparchies), including Bichvinta, Kutaisi, Gelati, Tsageri, Tsaishi, Tsalenjikha, Chkondidi, Khoni, Ninotsminda, Nikortsminda, Shemokmedi, Jumati, Dranda, Bedia, and Mokvi, centered on their respective cathedrals.

In the late 16th century, Catholicos Patriarch Eudemos I (Chkheidze) relocated his residence from Bichvinta to Gelati Monastery in Kutaisi, fleeing the Ottoman expansion into Abkhazia. Eudemos enacted significant reforms and restored communion with the Patriarchate of Georgia, maintaining his independent status. The Catholicoi typically came from prominent Georgian noble families, ensuring financial support and active involvement in western Georgia's political and cultural life. Nevertheless, the Islamization of Abkhazia, Adjara, and Lower Guria under Ottoman rule dealt a severe blow to the Catholicate. In the late 18th century, collaboration between the royal family and the church led to a revival of Christianity in Guria and parts of Abkhazia. Following the conquest of Imereti by Imperial Russia in 1810, the Catholicate of Abkhazia was abolished in 1814 and annexed to the Exarchate of Georgia, a subdivision of the Russian Orthodox Church, remaining part of it until the restoration of the unified and autocephalous Georgian Orthodox Church in 1917.

In 2009, the Abkhazian Orthodox Church was founded as a continuation of the Catholicate of Abkhazia, though it remains noncanonical within the Eastern Orthodox Church.

== Catholicoi of Abkhazia ==
List of Catholicos-Patriarchs of the Catholicate of Abkhazia from the 13th to the 19th century:

- Nicholas (latter part of the 13th century)
- Arsenius (c. 1390)
- Daniel (late 14th century)
- Joachim (1470s)
- Stephan (1490–1516)
- Malachia I Abashidze (1519–1540)
- Eudemios I Chkhetidze (1557–1578)
- Euthymius I Sakvarelidze (1578–1616)
- Malachia II Gurieli (1616–1639)
- Gregory I (1639)
- Maxim I Machutasdze (1639–1657)
- Zachary Kvariani (1657–1660)
- Simeon I Chkhetidze (1660–1666)
- Eudemios II Sakvarelidze (1666–1669)
- Euthymius II Sakvarelidze (1669–1673)
- David Nemsadze (1673–1696)
- Gregory II Lordkipanidze (1696–1742)
- German Tsulukidze (1742–1751)
- Bessarion Eristavi (1751–1769)
- Joseph Bagrationi (1769–1776)
- Maxim II Abashidze (1776–1795)
- Dositheus Tsereteli (de facto; 1795–1814)

=== Self-proclaimed Catholicoi of Abkhazia ===
- Vissarion Aplaa as Primate of the Abkhazian Orthodox Church since 2009

== Sources ==
- "АБХÁЗСКИЙ (ЗАПАДНОГРУЗИНСКИЙ) КАТОЛИКОСÁТ" (in Russian). Седмица.RU.
- Dowling, Theodore Edward (1912). Sketches of Georgian Church History. London. ISBN 1-4212-2891-2.
- Brosset, M.F. (1843). "Essai chronologique sur la série des catholicos d'Aphkhazeth". Bulletin de la classe des sciences historiques, philologiques et politiques de l'Académie Impériale des Sciences de Saint-Pétersbourg (in French). I (20/21): 305–324.
