= Principality of Guria =

Historical state in the Caucasus

Coordinates: 41.9333°N 41.9833°E

Principality of Guria გურიის სამთავრო
- 1463–1829
- 18th century coat of arms according to Vakhushti

- Status: Client state of Kingdom of Imereti (1460s–1810); Imperial Russia (1810–1828)
- Capital: Ozurgeti
- Common languages: Georgian
- Religion: Georgian Orthodox
- Government: Principality
- Prince-Gurieli
- History
  - Feudal wars in Georgia: 1463
  - Annexation by Imperial Russia: September 2 1829
Preceded by	Succeeded by
Kingdom of Georgia; Kingdom of Imereti	Russian Empire
- Today part of: Guria, Georgia

The Principality of Guria (Georgian: გურიის სამთავრო, romanized: guriis samtavro) was a historical state in Georgia. Centered on modern-day Guria, a southwestern region in Georgia, it was located between the Black Sea and Lesser Caucasus, and was ruled by a succession of twenty-two princes of the House of Gurieli from the 1460s to 1829. The principality emerged during the process of fragmentation of a unified Kingdom of Georgia. Its boundaries fluctuated in the course of permanent conflicts with neighboring Georgian rulers and the Ottoman Empire, and the principality enjoyed various degrees of autonomy until being annexed by Imperial Russia in 1829.

== Early history ==
Since the beginning of the 13th century, Guria, one of the provinces of the Kingdom of Georgia, located between Rioni and Chorokhi rivers was administered by hereditary governors (Eristavi). The Gurian ruler to whom the Georgian crown attached the title of Gurieli ("of Guria") took advantage of the Mongol invasion of Georgia and started asserting its independence in the 1280s, but the Mongols forced him to submit to George V "the Brilliant" (r. 1299–1346) in about 1330. However, soon after Bagrat V of Georgia (r. 1360–1390) ascended the throne, the Svans revolted to the northeast of Guria. Bagrat defeated them but subsequently ceded Guria to the Eristavi of Svaneti in c. 1362, and the Guria was usually held by the House of Vardanisdze thereafter.

In the 1460s, when the power of the Bagrationi dynasty of Georgia was on the decline, the Vardanisdze-Gurieli dynasty joined a rebellion of the great nobles of western Georgia, led by a royal kinsman, Bagrat, who refused to accept the authority of King George VIII of Georgia. In 1463, Bagrat and his allies met and defeated the king at the Battle of Chikhori. As a result, George VIII lost all the western provinces, and Bagrat was crowned king of Imereti, i.e., western Georgia. However, in return for their aid, the new monarch was obliged to create a vassal principality (samtavro) for each of his major allies, including the Gurieli family, who became semi-independent rulers of Guria with their seat at Ozurgeti In 1491, Giorgi I Gurieli (1483–1512) was recognized as a sovereign prince. From this time on, the Gurieli also appointed local bishops at Shemokmedi, Jumati, and Khinotsminda, nominally under the spiritual superintendence of the Georgian Orthodox Catholicos of Abkhazia. The polities of western Georgia fought one another for supremacy, particularly the Gurieli of Guria and Dadiani of Mingrelia. They forged a temporary alliance and organized, in January 1533, an ultimately disastrous expedition against the piratical tribe of Zygii in the north of Abkhazia. This setback enabled the king of Imereti to reassert his hegemony over Guria, but only for a short period.

== Under the Ottoman Empire ==
The Principality of Guria among the Georgian states in 1490

From the mid-16th century, the princes of Guria enjoyed de facto independence from Imereti, but faced a much more serious threat from their newly emerged southern neighbor, the Ottoman Empire, which imposed, in the 1540s, a naval blockade of Guria and annexed its southern provinces of Adjara, Northern Chaneti (latter-day Lazistan), and Machakheli, which had earlier been acquired by Rostom Gurieli (1534–64). The situation became even more precarious after the allied army of Georgian nobles suffered a defeat at the Battle of Sokhoista. Mamia II Gurieli (1600–1625) managed to reconquer Adjara in 1609, but was eventually forced to renounce, on December 13, 1614, any claims to the region and to pay an annual tribute to the Sublime Porte. The incessant feudal wars in western Georgia resulted in the decline of Guria, which eventually succumbed to the vassalage of the neighboring principality of Mingrelia. Yet, several princes of Guria, most notably George III Gurieli (1664–1684), and Mamia III Gurieli (1689–1714) managed to occasionally attain to the crown of Mingrelia and even of Imereti. The princely vassals of the Gurieli included the houses of Gugunava, Machutadze, Maksimenishvili, Nakashidze, Tavdgiridze, Shalikashvili, Zedginidze, and Eristavi-Shervashidze.

During the early 18th century, Guria faced an increasing political and economic downfall due to the Ottoman encroachments as well as repeated occasions of civil strife. Attempts by the Gurian princes to enter into alliances with other Georgian rulers and Russia resulted in a series of Turkish punitive raids. By 1723, the Gurieli had lost Batumi and Chakvi to the Ottomans and the whole coastline of Guria had been garrisoned by the Turks. The Gurian support to the Russians during the Russo-Turkish War (1768–1774) caused a severe reaction from the Ottoman government. Kobuleti and the surrounding area were detached from Guria and subjected to Islamization, an apostasy being the surest way to escape slavery. The rest of the Christian population had to move to safer regions of Georgia. This, combined with the extensive slave trade and Turkish inroads, resulted in a virtual depopulation of several areas of Guria towards the late 18th century. The population of Guria was estimated by Güldenstädt at 5,000, and by Reineggs at 6,000 families in the 1770s.

== Under Imperial Russia ==
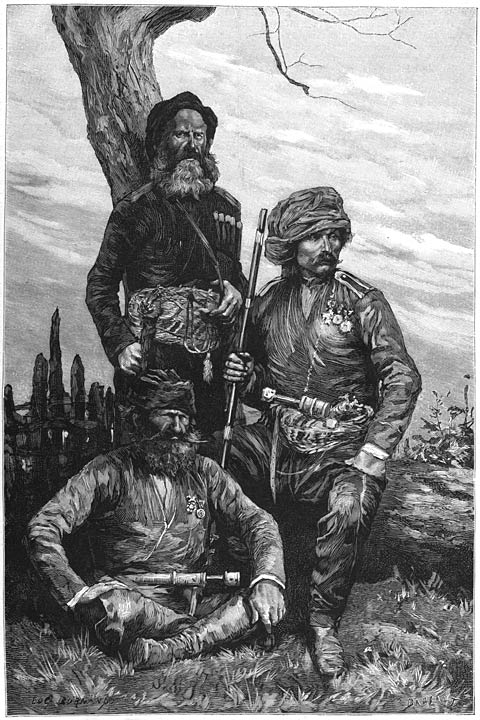
Militiamen from Guria, 1887

The latter-day princes of Guria firmly chose a pro-Russian orientation. During the Russo-Turkish War (1806–1812), on June 19, 1810, Mamia V Gurieli (1803–26) accepted Russian suzerainty, receiving insignia of investiture from the Tsar. Guria joined the empire as an autonomous principality, retaining its self-governance and a local code. Very desirous of adopting European customs and habits, Mamia initiated a series of reforms and modernized administration, economy, and education. He remained loyal to the Russian crown even in 1820, when his uncle, Kaikhosro, joined the rebellion in Imereti and Guria, which broke out spontaneously in protest to the Russian mistreatment of Georgian church and heavy taxation. When Mamia died on October 26, 1826, his underage son, David succeeded him on the throne under the regency of Princess Dowager Sophia. Anxious to secure her autonomy from the Russian government, she sided with the Turks during the Russo-Turkish War (1828–1829). On September 2, 1829, the Russian authorities deposed David and forced Sophia into exile to Turkey. Guria was annexed to the Russian Empire, first under a provisional governance, and then, in 1840, as the Ozurgeti uyezd within the Kutais Governorate.
