= Abashidze (surname) =

Abashidze (Georgian: აბაშიძე) is a Georgian surname associated with the princely House of Abashidze. Notable people with the surname include:

- Anna Abashidze (1730–1749), Georgian princess
- Aslan Abashidze, Georgian politician, separatist leader in the Ajarian Autonomous Republic in western Georgia
- Giorgi-Malakia Abashidze, Georgian nobleman, became king George VI of Imereti
- Grigol Abashidze, Georgian poet
- Haidar Abashidze, Georgian politician, journalist, and educator
- Irakli Abashidze, Georgian poet, literary scholar and politician
- Ivane Abashidze, Georgian nobleman, one of the leaders of the 1819 Imeretian Uprising, claimant to the throne of Imereti
- Kita Abashidze, Georgian literary critic, journalist, and politician
- Levan Abashidze (died 1757), Georgian prince, maternal grandfather of Solomon I of Imereti
- Levan Abashidze (1963–1992), Georgian film actor
- Memed Abashidze, Georgian politician, writer and public benefactor
- Nunu Abashydze, Ukrainian athlete, bronze medalist for the Soviet Union in 1982 European Athletics Championships
- Phinez Abashidze, son of Giorgi-Malakia Abashidze
- Vaso Abashidze, Georgian theater actor and a founder of a realistic acting tradition in Georgia
