= George IV Dadiani =

Prince of Mingrelia, Georgia, Europe

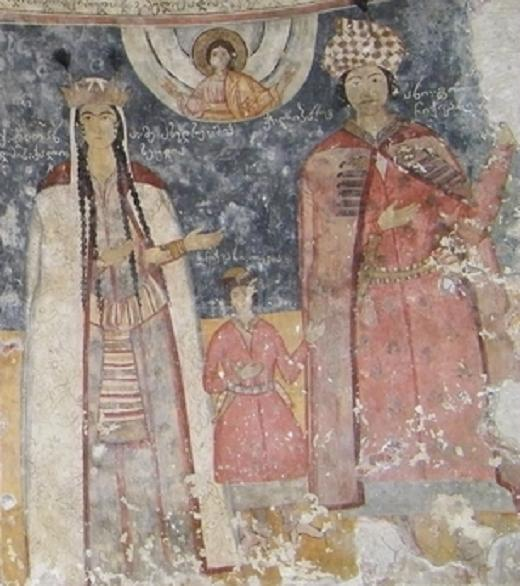
- George Lipartiani with his wife Sevdia as depicted in a fresco in the Martvili Monastery.

Prince of Mingrelia
- 1st reign: 1691–1704
- Predecessor: Levan IV Dadiani
- Successor: Katsia I Dadiani
- 2nd reign: 1710–1715
- Predecessor: Katsia I Dadiani
- Successor: Bezhan Dadiani
- Died: 1715
- Spouses: Sevdia Mikeladze; Tamar Abashidze; Tamar Gurieli
- Issue Among others: Katsia I Dadiani; Bezhan Dadiani
- House: Chikovani-Dadiani
- Father: Katsia Chikovani
- Mother: Mzekhatun Dadiani
- Religion: Georgian Orthodox Church (Catholicate of Abkhazia)

George IV Dadiani (Georgian: გიორგი IV დადიანი; died 1715) was Prince of Mingrelia from 1691 to 1704 and from 1710 to 1715. George's accession to rulership, following his ouster of the First House of Dadiani, inaugurated Mingrelia's second Dadiani dynasty, stemming from the House of Chikovani. George was also known as Lipartiani (ლიპარტიანი) by virtue of having Salipartiano as a fief from 1682 to 1715. George was actively involved in a series of civil wars that plagued the western Georgian polities. He was eventually deposed by his own son and placed under house arrest.

== Rise to power ==
George was a son of Katsia Chikovani, the lord of Lechkhumi by his wife, Mzekhatun Dadiani, daughter of Prince Levan III Dadiani. Under Levan III Dadiani, Katsia attained to lordship of Salipartiano, a key fiefdom in Mingrelia, and exerted significant influence in the principality. George succeeded on Katsia's death as lord of Salipartiano in 1682. By placing Levan IV Dadiani, Levan III's natural son, on the throne of Mingrelia against the rival claims of George III Gurieli, Prince of Guria, in 1691, George became Mingrelia's de facto ruler. He embarked on a relentless campaign to eliminate any opposition to his authority by killings and harassment and enriched himself by slave-trading. In 1691, he forced Levan IV Dadiani to abdicate and made himself prince of Mingrelia, assuming the title and surname of Dadiani.

== Civil war in Imereti ==
George Dadiani attempted to make his positions more secure by forging an alliance with the Imeretian prince Giorgi-Malakia Abashidze, who usurped the crown of Imereti in 1702. Dadiani married Abashidze's daughter Tamar, having repudiating his earlier union with Princess Sevdia Mikeladze, the mother of his several children. Dadiani then proceeded, with the instigation of his new wife, to confiscate estates of the Mikeladze family, who lent support to Abashidze's arch-rival, George VI of Imereti. Amid ongoing power struggle, Dadiani's own brother Iese, lord of Lechkhumi, married to George VII's aunt Mariam, switched sides, but this cost him his possessions in 1703. In 1703, the Ottomans mounted a major expedition to consolidate their authority in western Georgia. Dadiani pledged loyalty to Abashidze and resisted an Ottoman force landed in Mingrelia. The principality held out, but Ottoman soldiers were left to garrison the maritime towns of Poti and Anaklia.

== Downfall ==
The Abashidze and Dadiani power was draining away. In 1704, George Dadiani abdicated as prince of Mingrelia in favor of his elder son by his ex-wife Mikeladze, Katsia. To his younger son, Bezhan, he gave Lechkhumi and another, Gabriel, was made bishop of Chqondidi. George himself retired to his patrimonial fiefdom of Salipartiano, but maintained significant influence on his sons until 1709, when Katsia and Bezhan, who never forgave George for divorcing their mother, sided with King George VII of Imereti against the Abashidze–Lipartiani alliance. George fled to Abkhazia and returned to Mingrelia after the death of Katsia in 1710. He was, thus, able to resume his rule in Mingrelia and effected rapprochement with King George VII, only to defect him again in 1711. George's renewed principate was, however, challenged by his younger son, Bezhan, who enjoyed the king's support. In 1715, Bezhan invited George for family reconciliation, but had him disarmed and deposed. George was confined by Bezhan to house arrest and persuaded to remarry Sevdia Mikeladze, with whom George lived until his death in 1715.

== Family ==
George's first marriage was to Sevdia, daughter of Prince Otia Mikeladze; they divorced around 1700. His second marriage was to Tamar (1681–1707/1709), daughter of Prince George Abashidze and widow of Alexander IV of Imereti and George IV of Imereti. In 1710, he married for a third time to Tamar, daughter of Prince Mamia III Gurieli. They divorced in 1715, and in 1716 she married George VI of Imereti. In 1715, George remarried his first wife, Sevdia.

His children, all born from his first marriage to Sevdia, were:

- Katsia I Dadiani (died 1710), Prince of Mingrelia (r. 1704–1710);
- Bezhan Dadiani (died 1728), Prince of Mingrelia (r. 1715–1728);
- Manuchar;
- Anton, Metropolitan Bishop;
- Gabriel, Archbishop of Chqondidi;
- Mzekhatun, who married an unidentified Prince George of Imereti (according to genealogist Stanislav Dumin, she was married to George VII of Imereti).

George IV Dadiani House of Dadiani Born: ? Died: 1715
Regnal titles
Preceded by Levan IV Dadiani	Prince of Mingrelia; 1691–1704	Succeeded by Katsia I Dadiani
Preceded by Katsia I Dadiani	Prince of Mingrelia; 1710–1715	Succeeded by Bezhan Dadiani
