= Bezhan Dadiani =

Prince of Mingrelia
- Reign: 1715–1728
- Predecessor: George IV Dadiani
- Successor: Otia Dadiani
- Died: 1728
- Spouses: Tamar Gelovani
- Issue Among others: Otia Dadiani
- House: Dadiani-Chikovani
- Father: George IV Dadiani
- Mother: Sevdia Mikeladze
- Religion: Georgian Orthodox Church (Catholicate of Abkhazia)

Bezhan Dadiani (Georgian: ბეჟან დადიანი; died 1728), of the House of Dadiani, was Prince of Mingrelia from 1715 to 1728. He acceded to power in a coup against his own father, George IV Dadiani, and came to dominate western Georgian politics by asserting tutelage over King Alexander V of Imereti until being murdered by Ottoman agents.

== Early life ==
Bezhan was the second of George IV Dadiani by his wife, Princess Sevdia Mikeladze, whom George divorced, in 1701, to marry Princess Tamar Abashidze, daughter of the powerful prince Giorgi-Malakia Abashidze, sometime King of Imereti. In 1704, George made his eldest son, Katsia, prince of Mingrelia and installed Bezhan as lord of Lechkhumi, of which he had dispossessed his younger brother, Jesse. George himself retired to the patrimonial fiefdom of Salipartiano, but continued to wield significant influence on his sons until 1709, when Katsia and Bezhan—who never forgave George for divorcing their mother—forced George into flight to Abkhazia. George returned as prince of Mingrelia after Katsia's death in 1710, but his renewed authority was challenged by Bezhan, who enjoyed support of King George VI of Imereti.

== Rise to power ==
In 1715, Bezhan invited George for family reconciliation, but had him disarmed and deposed. George was confined by Bezhan to house arrest and persuaded to remarry Sevdia Mikeladze, with whom George lived until his death later that year. Like his father, Bezhan became involved in incessant intrigues and power struggles in Imereti. In 1720, he made accord with the Ottoman government and helped crown Alexander V, son of the murdered king George VI. Bezhan married his daughter Mariam to the young king Alexander and became the kingdom's most influential nobleman. He also intervened in Guria on several occasions, but eventually made peace with George IV Gurieli. While Bezhan dominated western Georgia, an Ottoman force was stationed in the Imeretian capital of Kutaisi, and Alexander was relegated to managing just his crown estates.

== Regent in Imereti ==
The two men were in uneasy alliance; Dadiani even contemplated to kill Alexander, but refrained from betraying the king, his son-in-law, because of his daughter and because Alexander had devoted bodyguards. Bezhan was ruthless in crushing opposition; rival noblemen were killed or arrested. He had his brother Manuchar cast in prison and another, Bishop Gabriel of Chqondidi, defrocked once this corrupted and slave-trading cleric became involved in intrigues against Bezhan and Alexander. The two rulers then campaigned against the defiant duke of Racha, who finally agreed to peace and married Dadiani's daughter in 1726.

Dadiani's power and prestige alarmed another influential Imeretian nobleman, Zurab Abashidze, who persuaded the Ottoman pasha of Akhaltsikhe, Isaq, to send his son Yusuf for meeting with Bezhan Dadiani at the Geguti castle near Kutaisi in 1728. Bezhan was assured of safety and was stabbed to death the moment he entered the castle.

== Family ==
Bezhan was married to Princess Tamar Gelovani. They had six sons and three daughters:

- Otia Dadiani (died 1757), Prince of Mingrelia (r. 1728–1757);
- Beri;
- Katso (Katsia-Giorgi) (died 1732), whose daughter, Darejan, married Heraclius II of Georgia;
- Mariam (died 1731), who married Alexander V of Imereti in 1721 as his first wife;
- Manuchar;
- Gabriel, Bishop of Chqondidi;
- Grigol (died 1777), Metropolitan Bishop;
- Darejan, who married Mamuka of Imereti in 1732;
- Khvaramze, who married first Prince Giorgi Nizharadze, second George IV Gurieli, Prince of Guria, and third Shoshita III, Duke of Racha.

Bezhan Dadiani House of Dadiani Born: ? Died: 1728
Regnal titles
| Preceded by George IV Dadiani | Prince of Mingrelia; 1715–1728 | Succeeded by Otia Dadiani |
