= Kaikhosro III Gurieli =

Georgian aristocrat and military commander

Prince of Guria
- Reign: 1716–1717
- Predecessor: George IV Gurieli
- Successor: George IV Gurieli
- Died: c. 1751
- Issue: Stephane Gurieli
- House: Gurieli
- Father: Mamia III Gurieli
- Mother: Elene Abashidze
- Religion: Georgian Orthodox Church (Catholicate of Abkhazia)

Kaikhosro III Gurieli (Georgian: ქაიხოსრო III გურიელი; died c. 1751) was a member of the Georgian house of Gurieli, a princely dynasty of Guria. He was briefly Prince-regnant of Guria as a rival to his brother George IV Gurieli from 1716 to 1717. In 1724, he emigrated to the Russian Empire, where he commanded the Georgian Hussar Regiment in the 1740s.

== Biography ==
Kaikhosro was the second son of Mamia III Gurieli, Prince of Guria, and Helen, daughter of Giorgi-Malakia Abashidze. He was a monk in 1716, when Elene engineered a coup against his own son, George IV Gurieli, whom she deposed with the help of Mingrelian and Imeretian troops and installed Kaikhosro as prince of Guria. Next year, George was able to resume his rule with the help of Ottoman pasha of Erzurum; Elene and Kaikhosro fled to Kartli under the protection of Vakhtang VI, whose mother Tuta was Kaikhosro's grandfather's sister.

In 1724, Kaikhosro and his wife followed Vakhtang VI in his exile into Russia occasioned by the Ottoman invasion of Kartli. Known in Russia as Kaikhosro Matveyevich Gurielov, he was enlisted in the Georgian Hussar Regiment in 1738 and granted an estate in the Poltava Governorate. In 1741, he was promoted to the rank of podpolkovnik and placed in command of the Georgian Hussar Regiment. He retired in 1751. Kaikhosro's Russia-born son Stephane (1730–1812) and grandson Ivan (1770–1818) were major-generals of the Imperial Russian Army. With Ivan's death, the Gurieli's Russian branch went extinct in a male line; Kaikhosro's female-line descendants sought the right to carry the surname of Gurieli into their families in the 19th century, but to no avail.

Kaikhosro III Gurieli House of Gurieli
Regnal titles
| Preceded by George IV Gurieli | Prince of Guria; 1716–1717 | Succeeded by George IV Gurieli |
