= Kaikhosro II Gurieli =

Prince of Guria
- Reign: 1685–1689
- Predecessor: Malakia II Gurieli
- Successor: Malakia II Gurieli
- Born: 1670
- Died: 1689 (aged 18–19)
- House: Gurieli
- Father: George III Gurieli
- Mother: Tamar Chijavadze
- Religion: Georgian Orthodox Church (Catholicate of Abkhazia)

Kaikhosro II Gurieli (Georgian: ქაიხოსრო II გურიელი; 1670–1689), of the House of Gurieli, was Prince of Guria, in western Georgia, from 1685 to 1689. He vied for the control of Guria with his uncle, Malakia II Gurieli, who he had blinded. Kaikhosro was eventually killed by agents of the Ottoman pasha of Childir, who sought regional hegemony in southwestern Caucasus.

== Biography ==
Kaikhosro was born in 1670. He was the eldest son of George III Gurieli and Tamar Chijavadze. On George's death at the battle of Rokiti against King Alexander IV of Imereti in 1684, Kaikhosro and his brothers fled to the protection of Yusuf, the Ottoman pasha of Childir, while Alexander installed their uncle, Malakia II, as the ruler of Guria. Next year, Kaikhosro returned with troops provided by the pasha, deposed Malakia, and sent him in exile to Akhaltsikhe. The pasha attempted the reconciliation between the two Gurieli, but Kaikhosro reneged on his promise not to harm Malakia and had his uncle captured and blinded. This offended the pasha, who sent the bey of Şavşat to Guria with a secret instruction to kill Kaikhosro. After hosting the Ottoman dignitary in Guria, Kaikhosro departed for a reciprocal visit. On his way, Kaikhosro was captured, killed, and beheaded. Guria reversed to the blinded Malakia. Kaikhosro was betrothed to Helen, daughter of Prince Giorgi-Malakia Abashidze; the marriage was never consummated and the girl eventually married Kaikhosro's brother Mamia.

== Bibliography ==
- Toumanoff, Cyril (1976). Manuel de Généalogie et de Chronologie pour l'histoire de la Caucasie chrétienne (Arménie, Géorgie, Albanie) [Manual of Genealogy and Chronology of Christian Caucasian History (Armenia, Georgia, Albania)] (in French). Rome: Edizioni Aquila.

Kaikhosro II Gurieli House of Gurieli
Regnal titles
Preceded by Malakia II Gurieli	Prince of Guria; 1685–1689	Succeeded by Malakia II Gurieli
