= Paata (name) =

Paata (Georgian: პაატა) is a masculine Georgian given name. Notable people with the name include:

- Paata Abashidze (died 1684), Georgian noble prince
- Prince Paata of Kartli (1720–1765), Georgian prince royal
- Paata Shamugia, Georgian poet
- Paata Burchuladze (born 1955), Georgian operatic bass
- Paata Jincharadze (born 1974), Georgian footballer
- Paata Gudushauri (born 1997), Georgian footballer
- Paata Berishvili (born 1973), Russian football coach of Georgian origin
- Paata Mkheidze (born 1960), Georgian lawyer
