= Mamia III Gurieli =

Prince of Guria
- 1st Reign: 1689–1711
- Predecessor: Malakia II Gurieli
- Successor: George IV Gurieli
- 2nd Reign: 1713–1714
- Predecessor: George IV Gurieli
- Successor: George IV Gurieli

King of Imereti
- 1st Reign: 1701–1702
- Predecessor: Simon
- Successor: George V Abashidze
- 2nd Reign: 1711–1712
- Predecessor: George VI
- Successor: George VI
- 3rd Reign: 1713–1714
- Predecessor: George VI
- Successor: George VI
- Died: 5 January 1714
- Burial: Shemokmedi Monastery
- Spouse: Elene Abashidze (m. 1691; div. 1711) Tamar of Racha (m. 1711)
- Issue Among others: George IV Gurieli; Kaikhosro III Gurieli; Levan Gurieli; Tamar
- House: Gurieli
- Father: George III Gurieli
- Mother: Tamar Chijavadze
- Religion: Georgian Orthodox Church (Catholicate of Abkhazia)

Mamia III Gurieli (Georgian: მამია III გურიელი), also known as Mamia the Great Gurieli (დიდი გურიელი, Didi Gurieli) or the Black Gurieli (შავი გურიელი, Shavi Gurieli) (died 5 January 1714), of the western Georgian House of Gurieli, was Prince of Guria from 1689 to 1714. Involved in civil wars plaguing western Georgia, he became King of Imereti three times in the years of 1701–1702, 1711–1712, and 1713–1714. After his first reign as king for a year in 1701, he abdicated the throne of Imereti, being unable to tolerate the influence of his father-in-law Giorgi Abashidze. Subsequent periods of his royal career was the result of a feud with George VI of Imereti. Mamia died while still sitting on the throne of Imereti, which then reverted to his rival George VII.

== Accession and early rule in Guria ==
Mamia was a younger son of George III Gurieli and his wife, Princess Tamar Chijavadze. On George's death at the battle of Rokiti against King Alexander IV of Imereti in 1684, Mamia joined his brothers in exile in Akhaltsikhe under the protection of its Ottoman governor Yusuf-Pasha. In the subsequent infighting between Mamia's elder brother Kaikhosro II Gurieli and his paternal uncle Malakia II Gurieli, the former lost his life, while the latter was deprived of his sight. Eventually, in 1689, at the request of Guria's nobility, Mamia was summoned from Akhaltsikhe and installed as prince with the pasha's support, while the blinded Malakia was made Bishop of Shemokmedi by the new Gurieli ruler.

In 1690, Mamia hosted George XI, the exiled king of Kartli and a foe of Alexander IV of Imereti, but soon became suspicious of his nobles' loyalty to the guest and began a crackdown on the suspected opposition, forcing George to relocate to the Ottoman-controlled Gonio. In the incessant power struggles in Imereti, Mamia originally supported his father-in-law George Abashidze, but, in 1699, he helped Abashidze's estranged son-in-law, King Simon, return from his exile in Kartli and recover the crown of Imereti. In return, Simon agreed to divorce Abashidze's daughter Anika and marry Mamia's sister. Abashidze, supported by the Mingrelian regent George Lipartiani, marshaled his troops on the borders of Guria and requested that Gurieli kill Simon, promising to make Mamia king of Imereti. Gurieli refused to do that himself, but allowed Abashidze's agents to shoot Simon dead in a bathroom in 1701.

== First reign in Imereti and Ottoman invasion ==
Pursuant to his promise, Abashidze made Mamia king of Imereti, if in name only. Abashidze controlled royal domains, revenues, and nobility, while Mamia had to sell his Gurian subjects in slavery to meet his own expenses. Later that year, Mamia felt compelled to abdicate and retire to Guria. Abashidze made himself king of Imereti and, thus, a suzerain of Guria and Mingrelia.

In 1703, Guria as well as the rest of western Georgia faced a major invasion by the Ottoman Empire. Eager to tighten a loosening grip over their Caucasian subjects, the Ottomans mounted a large-scale invasion, with the intention to eliminate the sovereignty of Guria and limit that of Imereti. A revolt of the troops bound to Georgia forced the Ottomans to withdraw from Georgia's interior, but the coastal area around Batumi was permanently lost for Guria.

== Second and third reigns in Imereti ==
By 1707, the unity imposed by Abashidze on western Georgia crumbled. In 1709, Abashidze and his Mingrelian allies were defeated by his rival George VI, who enjoyed the Ottomans' support. George then raided and ravaged Guria in response of Mamia's support of Abashidze. George's corrupt rule soon became intolerable to the Imeretians; in October 1711, Mamia secured the support of the nobles of Mingrelia, Racha, and Lechkhumi and reestablished himself as king of Imereti, leaving Guria to his son George IV Gurieli. During his tenure, he banned slave-trading and opened schools in Guria.

Both George VI and George Abashidze took refuge with King Vakhtang VI of Kartli, who attempted to end the feud. Abashidze returned to his estates in Imereti. The deposed king George went to Akhaltsikhe and conspired with Zurab Abashidze, George Abashidze's nephew, who had been dispossessed by Mamia. In June 1712, George VI and Zurab Abashidze secretly invaded the district of Argveti and inflicted defeat on Mamia and George Abashidze at Chkhari.

Gurieli fled to Racha and then to Kartli, where he was hosted in Tskhinvali by Vakhtang VI's son Bakar. Supported by the government of Kartli, Mamia made his way to Guria. In November 1713, Mamia Gurieli, joined by Dadiani, the duke of Racha, George Abashidze, and the Lechkhumians, defeated King George at Kutaisi and forced him into flight to Akhaltsikhe. Mamia died two months later, on 5 January 1714 and George VI was restored once again. Mamia's remains were taken to Guria and interred at the Shemokmedi Monastery.

== Family ==
Mamia III Gurieli was married twice. His first marriage, in 1691, was to Elene, daughter of Prince George Abashidze. After their marriage was repudiated in 1711, Mamia married Tamar (died 1714), daughter of Papuna II, Duke of Racha, and the former wife of Prince Papuna Mkheidze. Following Mamia's death, Tamar married her late husband's rival, King George VI of Imereti, but died soon afterward. Mamia had six children—four sons and two daughters:

- George IV Gurieli (died 1726), Regent of Guria (1711–1714), Prince of Guria (r. 1714–1726), and King of Imereti (r. 1716);
- Kaikhosro III Gurieli (died c. 1751), Prince of Guria (r. 1717);
- Levan Gurieli, Prince of Guria (r. 1712–1713), who seized power with the help of the Turks in opposition to his father, but was unable to remain on the throne;
- Nicholas (died 1755), Archbishop of Shemokmedi;
- Tamar (Kochibrola) (died 1742), who was first married to George IV Dadiani and second to George VI of Imereti;
- An unnamed daughter, who married Prince George Sharvashidze, Eristavi of Guria.

== Bibliography ==
- Chkhataraishvili, Kveli (1959). გურიის სამთავრო : პოლიტიკური და სოციალურ-ეკონომიური ისტორიის ნარკვევი (in Georgian).

Mamia III Gurieli House of Gurieli
Regnal titles
Preceded by Malakia II Gurieli	Prince of Guria; 1689–1714	Succeeded by George IV Gurieli
Preceded by Simon	King of Imereti; 1701–1702	Succeeded by George V Abashidze
Preceded by George VI	King of Imereti; 1711–1712	Succeeded by George VI
Preceded by George VI	King of Imereti; 1713–1714	Succeeded by George VI
