= George III Gurieli =

Prince of Guria
- Reign: 1664–1684
- Predecessor: Demetrius Gurieli
- Successor: Malakia II Gurieli

King of Imereti
- Reign: 1681–1683
- Predecessor: Bagrat IV
- Successor: Alexander IV
- Born: 1651
- Died: 1684 (aged 32–33)
- Spouse: Tamar Chijavadze (m. 1667) Darejan of Imereti (m. 1677; div. 1681) Tamar of Mukhrani (m. 1681; died 1683) Niece of Shoshita II of Racha (m. 1683)
- Issue Among others: Kaikhosro II Gurieli; Mamia III Gurieli
- House: Gurieli
- Father: Kaikhosro I Gurieli
- Mother: Khvaramze Goshadze
- Religion: Georgian Orthodox Church (Catholicate of Abkhazia)

George III Gurieli (Georgian: გიორგი III გურიელი, romanized: giorgi III gurieli; 1651–1684), of the Georgian House of Gurieli, was Prince of Guria from 1664 to 1684 and King of Imereti from 1681 to 1683. He was energetically involved in civil wars in western Georgian polities, which he sought to bring under his sway. He was killed in battle while trying to recover the lost throne of Imereti.

== Biography ==
George was born in 1651 (or 1652) as the eldest son of Kaikhosro I Gurieli and his wife, Khvaramze Goshadze.

After the assassination of his father, George and his brother Malakia fled to the protection of the Ottoman pasha of Akhaltsikhe, whose help he exploiting in securing the princely throne of Guria after the overthrown of Demetrius Gurieli in 1664 (or 1668). According to the 18th-century Georgian historian Prince Vakhushti George was "powerful, brave, superb warrior, godless, bloodthirsty, and a merciless slave-trader". He successfully fought the piratical Abkhaz who raided the coast of Guria on more than one occasion.

== Conflicts in Imereti and Mingrelia ==
In 1672, George, with an extravagant bribe, bought the pasha's support against King Bagrat IV of Imereti, with an eye on the king's beautiful wife Tamar, whom Gurieli admired as claimed by Prince Vakhushti. Bagrat was defeated by the allies at Kutaisi and made a prisoner, but released after the pasha extracted a greater bribe from him and became convinced that taking the fortress of Kvara—where Tamar had taken refuge—was a futile endeavor. Bagrat promptly avenged Gurieli, attacking and looting Guria that same year. Eventually, the two men reconciled; George married Bagrat's daughter Darejan in 1674 and offered him a shelter when Bagrat was deposed in favor of Archil II, son of Vakhtang V of Kartli, in 1678.

Archil, further, restored Bagrat's wife Tamar, an Imeretian femme fatale, to her previous husband Levan III Dadiani, Prince of Mingrelia. Gurieli invoked his ties with the Ottoman government; the pasha of Erzurum arrived with troops and helped Bagrat reclaim his crown and wife in 1679. The defeated Dadiani managed to retain his principality at the expense of surrendering his only heir Manuchar as a hostage to George Gurieli. On Levan's death in 1680, Gurieli's claim to Dadiani's succession was rejected by the Mingrelians. George then executed Manuchar and attempted to seize Mingrelia by force, but failed.

== King of Imereti ==
King Bagrat's death in 1681 provided George Gurieli with an opportunity to claim the long-coveted Imeretian crown and Queen Tamar for himself. As Bagrat's only surviving heir Alexander, a natural son by a concubine, was held as a hostage in Kartli, George Gurieli was installed by the Imeretian nobles as their king. He then divorced his child-bride Darejan and illegally married his mother-in-law Tamar. That same year, George made another attempt to seize Mingrelia, but the Mingrelian magnate George Lipartiani foiled his designs and installed the late Levan Dadiani's namesake natural son.

The incestuous king quickly lost support among the Imeretians. In 1683, at their request, the pasha of Akhaltsikhe convinced King George XI of Kartli to release Bagrat the Blind's son Alexander from custody and secured the sultan's approval for his enthronement in Imereti. George Gurieli was forced to retire to Guria. Next year, he mounted a revolt of nobility against Alexander, involving Shoshita, Duke of Racha, Princes Lordkipanidze and Chijavadze, the nobles of Lechkhumi, and George Lipartiani, regent of Mingrelia. Gurieli arrived with his troops in Imereti and looted the venerated icon of the Theotokos of Blachernae. Alexander found major support in the princes Abashidze, notably Paata Abashidze, and Mikeladze. At the bloody battle of Rokiti, Gurieli was defeated and killed. His sons fled to Akhaltsikhe, while his brother Malakia was made Prince of Guria by the victorious king Alexander.

== Family ==
George III Gurieli was married four times. His first marriage was to Tamar Chijavadze in 1667. His second marriage took place in 1677 to Princess Darejan, the daughter of King Bagrat IV of Imereti and Queen Tamar. George divorced Darejan in 1681 to marry her mother, Queen Tamar, making her his third wife. Following Queen Tamar's death in 1683, he married for a fourth time to an unnamed niece of Shoshita II, Duke of Racha. She had previously been married to Katsia Chikovani, and following George's death, she married Giorgi-Malakia Abashidze.

The children of George III Gurieli were:

- Kaikhosro II Gurieli (1669–1689), Prince of Guria (r. 1685–1689);
- Mamia III Gurieli (died 1714), Prince of Guria (r. 1689–1714) and King of Imereti (r. 1701–1702, 1711–1712, 1713–1714);
- A daughter, who married Manuchar, son of Levan III Dadiani;
- A daughter, who married Aslan II Jaqeli, Pasha of Childir;
- A daughter, who married King Simon of Imereti.

== Bibliography ==
- Chkhataraishvili, Kveli (1959). გურიის სამთავრო : პოლიტიკური და სოციალურ-ეკონომიური ისტორიის ნარკვევი (in Georgian).
- Toumanoff, Cyril (1976). Manuel de Généalogie et de Chronologie pour l'histoire de la Caucasie chrétienne (Arménie, Géorgie, Albanie) [Manual of Genealogy and Chronology of Christian Caucasian History (Armenia, Georgia, Albania)] (in French). Rome: Edizioni Aquila.
- Brosset, Marie-Félicité (1856). Histoire de la Georgie depuis l'antiquite jusqu'au 19. siecle (in French). Vol. 5. l'acad. Imper. des sciences.
- Dumbadze, Mamia (1954). მასალები საქართველოს და კავკასიის ისტორიისათვის : ნაკვეთი XXX (in Georgian). Vol. გურიის სამთავროს სოციალურ-ეკონომიური ვითარება XIX საუკუნის პირველ მესამედში. Tbilisi: Academy of Sciences.

George III Gurieli House of Gurieli
Regnal titles
| Preceded by Demetrius Gurieli | Prince of Guria; 1664–1684 | Succeeded by Malakia II Gurieli |
| Preceded by Bagrat IV | King of Imereti; 1681–1683 | Succeeded by Alexander IV |
