= 1781 in Russia =

Events from the year 1781 in Russia

== Incumbents ==
- Monarch – Catherine II

== Events ==
- Austro-Russian alliance (1781)
- Cheboksary granted city status
- Great Gatchina Palace completed
- Nazran founded; largest city in Ingushetia
- Ufa Viceroyalty established

== Births ==
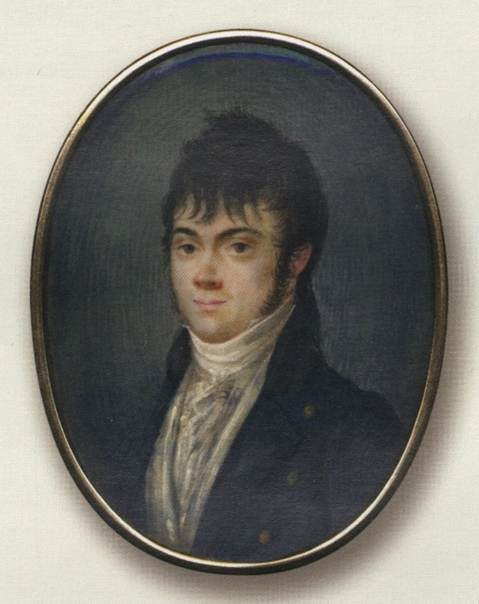
Alexander Vostokov

- Alexander Bulgakov (d. 1863) - diplomat, senator, postal official
- Ilya Gruzinov (d. 1813) - professor of anatomy and physiology
- Mikhail Malakhov (d. 1842) - architect
- Gleb Shishmaryov (d. 1835) - admiral, navigator, explorer
- Nikita Volkonsky (d. 1844) - aristocrat and general
- Alexander Vostokov (d. 1864) - philologist and poet

== Deaths ==
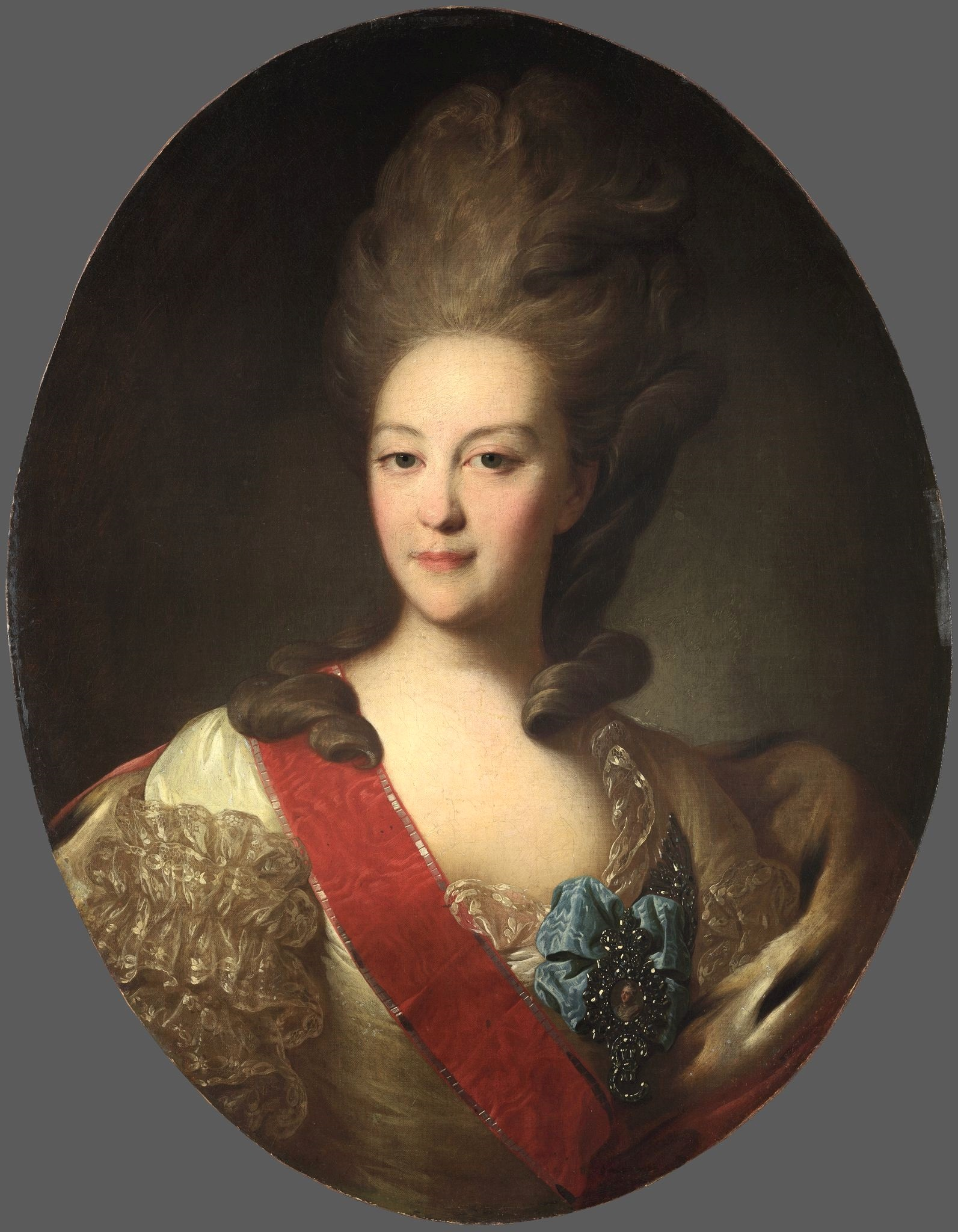
Catherine Orlova by Fyodor Rokotov, 1779

- Ivan Bagration (b. 1725) - general of Georgian royal origin
- Abram Petrovich Gannibal (b. circa 1696) - military engineer, general, nobleman
- Johann Anton Güldenstädt (b. 1745) - naturalist and explorer
- Alexey Nagayev (b. 1704) - hydrographer, cartographer, admiral
- Ekaterina Orlova (b. 1758) - lady-in-waiting to Catherine the Great
