= Tamar Gurieli (died 1742) =

18th-century Georgian princess

- Died: 1742
- Spouse: George IV Dadiani (1710–1714); George VI of Imereti (1716–1720)
- Issue: George VII of Imereti; Princess Anna
- House: Gurieli
- Father: Mamia III Gurieli
- Mother: Helen Abashidze
- Religion: Georgian Orthodox Church (Catholicate of Abkhazia)

Tamar Gurieli (died 1742) was an 18th-century Georgian princess of the House of Gurieli and Queen consort of Imereti. Through her marriages to George IV Dadiani, Prince of Mingrelia and later to King George VI of Imereti, she became a central figure in the dynastic politics and civil conflicts of western Georgia. Active during a prolonged period of instability, she was involved in struggles among Guria, Mingrelia, Imereti, and the Ottoman authorities, and is remembered in Georgian historiography—following Donald Rayfield—as the last of the so-called “femmes fatales” of Imereti.

== Biography ==
Tamar Gurieli was probably born around 1698, (Note: Mamia III Gurieli married his first wife in 1698. He remarried in 1711, the year of Tamar's first marriage.) from the first marriage of Prince Mamia III Gurieli and Helen Abashidze. As the couple’s eldest daughter, Tamar was early used as a diplomatic intermediary to forge a powerful alliance between Guria and the neighboring Principality of Mingrelia against the central crown of the Kingdom of Imereti. Accordingly, she married Prince George IV Dadiani, Prince of Mingrelia as early as 1710, while still in her adolescence. This marriage encouraged George IV to join a revolt against King George VI of Imereti.

However, the Mingrelian princely family opposed the union between Tamar and Prince George IV. The central government in Kutaisi then financed a rebellion led by George IV’s younger son, Bezhan Dadiani, who succeeded in overthrowing his father in 1714 and forced his divorce from Tamar. George IV was then compelled to remarry Bezhan’s mother, Sevdia Mikeladze, while Tamar left Mingrelia and probably returned to Guria. At that time, Guria was ruled by her brother, George IV Gurieli, following their father’s death in the same year.

In 1716, Princess Tamar—by then renowned among the nobility for her beauty and nicknamed Kortchibola (“Crystal Ankles”)—married King George VI of Imereti, the former enemy of her first husband. The wedding took place in Akhaltsikhe and was protected by the local Ottoman pasha.

The effective sovereignty of the royal couple proved short-lived. While the pasha of Akhaltsikhe supported King George VI, the Ottoman governor of the neighboring province of Erzurum disagreed with this policy. As a result, George VI and Tamar were sent to Constantinople in order to obtain the approval of the Sublime Porte. During their absence, Imereti descended into chaos, as the nobility took advantage of the royal couple’s temporary exile to devastate Crown lands. During their stay in the Ottoman Empire, Tamar gave birth to two children.

Tamar returned to Imereti with her husband in 1719, but George VI was assassinated a year later. He was briefly succeeded by Tamar’s brother, George Gurieli, who was soon overthrown by Alexander V, Tamar’s stepson and the eldest son of George VI. The new king pursued a policy of reunification, suppressing noble rebellions by allying with Mingrelia and bribing lesser nobles. Tamar, however, continued the long-standing opposition of the House of Gurieli to central authority. She left Kutaisi with Bishop Gabriel I of Chkondidi and sought to destabilize the kingdom from Akhaltsikhe.

Nevertheless, the Ottoman pasha of Akhaltsikhe, Ishaq Jaqeli, refused to ally with Tamar. He captured the former queen and handed her over to Prince Bezhan of Mingrelia, her former stepson. Tamar’s fate thereafter remains unclear until her reappearance in 1741, when the new pasha of Akhaltsikhe, Yusuf III Jaqeli, temporarily deposed Alexander V and placed George VII, the son of Tamar and George VI, on the throne. This reign was short-lived, and Alexander V regained power later the same year, accusing his former mother-in-law of orchestrating conspiracies against the kingdom. In 1742, he ordered Tamar’s execution by beheading, bringing to an end the civil wars that had plagued Imereti since the 1660s.

== Family and issue ==
Tamar Gurieli married Prince George IV Dadiani of Mingrelia in 1710. The marriage produced no children and ended in divorce in 1714. She subsequently married King George VI of Imereti.

From her second marriage, Tamar had two children:

- George VII of Imereti (1718–1778), who became King of Imereti in 1741;
- Princess Anna, who married Zaal Sharvashidze-Eristavi of Guria, Prince of Sajavakho.

== Bibliography ==
- Rayfield, Donald (2012). Edge of Empires: A History of Georgia. London: Reaktion Books. ISBN 978-1-78023-070-2.
