= Alexander IV =

Alexander IV may refer to:

- Pope Alexander IV (c. 1185 or 1199–1261)
- Alexander IV of Macedon (323 BC–309 BC), son of Alexander the Great
- Alexander IV of Imereti (died 1695), of the Bagrationi Dynasty, king of Imereti (western Georgia)
