= Giorgi IV =

Giorgi IV may refer to:

- George IV of Georgia (1191–1223)
- Giorgi IV, Catholicos of Kartli in 1225–1230
- Giorgi IV of Imereti
- George IV of Guria (died in 1726)
