= Tamar Abashidze =

Tamar Abashidze may refer to:

- Tamar Abashidze (1681–1716), wife of Alexander IV of Imereti
- Tamar Abashidze (died 1772), wife of Alexander V of Imereti
- Tamar Abashidze (actress) (1892–1960), Georgian actress, a People's Artist of the Georgian SSR
