= Katsia I Dadiani =

Prince of Mingrelia from 1704 to 1710

Katsia I Dadiani (Georgian: კაცია I დადიანი; died 1710), of the House of Dadiani, was Prince of Mingrelia from 1704 to 1710.

== Early life ==
Katsia was the eldest son of George IV Dadiani by his wife, Sevdia Mikeladze, whom Giorgi divorced, in 1701, to marry Tamar, daughter of the powerful prince Giorgi-Malakia Abashidze, sometime King of Imereti. Katsia became Prince of Mingrelia on Giorgi IV Dadiani's abdication and retirement to the fiefdom of Salipartiano in 1704, but he remained under his father's influence until 1709, when Katsia and his brother, Bezhan—who never forgave Giorgi for divorcing their mother—forced Giorgi into flight to Abkhazia. Giorgi was able to return and reinstate himself as Prince of Mingrelia when Katsia died in 1710. Katisa was not married and had no children.

Katsia I Dadiani House of Dadiani Born: ? Died: 1710
Regnal titles
Preceded by Giorgi IV Dadiani	Prince of Mingrelia; 1704–1710	Succeeded by Giorgi IV Dadiani
