= George VII of Imereti =

George VII

King of Imereti
- Reign: 1741
- Predecessor: Alexander V
- Successor: Alexander V
- Born: 1718
- Died: 1778 (aged 59–60)
- Spouse: Mzekhatun Lipartiani
- Issue: Prince Rostom; Princess Elene; Princess Mzekhatun; David II of Imereti; Princess Darejan
- Dynasty: Bagrationi
- Father: George VI of Imereti
- Mother: Tamar Gurieli
- Religion: Georgian Orthodox Church (Catholicate of Abkhazia)

George VII (Georgian: გიორგი VII, romanized: giorgi VII; sometimes known as George XI; 1718–1778), of the Bagrationi dynasty, was king (mepe) of Imereti in 1741.

== Biography ==
The third son of George VI of Imereti by his wife Tamar (daughter of Mamia III Gurieli), he was enthroned after his brother Alexander V was ousted in the Ottoman-sponsored coup. Later that year, he was rescinded and Alexander regained the crown. George went into exile to his father-in-law George Lipartiani in Mingrelia, but was allowed to return to Imereti during the reign of his nephew, Solomon I.

== Family ==
George was married to Mzekhatun Lipartiani, daughter of Prince Giorgi Lipartiani. They had two sons and three daughters:

- Prince Rostom (fl. 1746);
- Princess Elene (1745–1810), who married George (died 1787), Duke of Racha;
- Princess Mzekhatun (1748–1810), who married Papuna Tsereteli (fl. 1740–1790);
- David II of Imereti (1755–1795), King of Imereti (r. 1784–1789);
- Princess Darejan (1757–1810), who married Simon Abashidze (fl. 1790–1810).

| Preceded by Alexander V | King of Imereti; 1741 | Succeeded by Alexander V |
