= Malakia II Gurieli =

Prince of Guria ( fl. 1660–1703)

Prince of Guria
- 1st reign: 1684–1685
- Predecessor: George III Gurieli
- Successor: Kaikhosro II Gurieli
- 2nd reign: 1689
- Predecessor: Kaikhosro II Gurieli
- Successor: Mamia III Gurieli
- Died: After 1703
- House: Gurieli
- Father: Kaikhosro I Gurieli
- Mother: Khvaramze Goshadze
- Religion: Georgian Orthodox Church (Catholicate of Abkhazia)

Malakia II Gurieli (Georgian: მალაქია II გურიელი; fl. 1660–1703), of the Georgian House of Gurieli, was Prince of Guria from 1684 to 1685 and again in 1689. A younger son of Kaikhosro I Gurieli, he succeeded on the death of his brother George III Gurieli in 1684, only to be overthrown and blinded by his nephew Kaikhosro II Gurieli. Briefly restored through the Ottoman intervention in 1689, he was deposed by Guria's nobility for incompetence. Malakia entered the priesthood and became Bishop of Shemokmedi.

== Biography ==
Malakia Gurieli was a younger son of Kaikhosro I Gurieli, Prince of Guria, by his wife Khvaramze Goshadze. On the murder of Kaikhosro by the nobleman Machutadze in 1660, Malakia and his elder brother George fled to the protection of the Ottoman pasha of Akhaltsikhe, whose help George eventually exploiting in securing the princely throne of Guria in 1664.

In 1684, George was killed at the battle of Rokiti against King Alexander IV of Imereti and Malakia was placed as his successor by the victorious king. Next year, George's son Kaikhosro returned from his exile in Akhaltsikhe with troops provided by Yusuf Pasha of Akhaltsikhe; Malakia was dethroned and, in his turn, retired to Akhaltsikhe. The pasha attempted the reconciliation between the two Gurieli, but Kaikhosro reneged on his promise not to harm Malakia and had his uncle captured and blinded. This offended the pasha, who had the bey of Şavşat assassinated Kaikhosro in 1689. Malakia was restored as Prince of Guria, but his rule did not last long. The Gurians, who regarded Malakia incompetent, bribed the pasha of Akhaltsikhe and secured his support in deposing Malakia in favor of his another nephew, Mamia III Gurieli. Malakia took the monastic vows and was made by Mamia Gurieli bishop of Shemokmedi, a position he occupied until 1703, when he was replaced with the archbishop Ioane.

Malakia II Gurieli House of Gurieli
Regnal titles
Preceded by George III Gurieli	Prince of Guria; 1684–1685	Succeeded by Kaikhosro II Gurieli
Regnal titles
Preceded by Kaikhosro II Gurieli	Prince of Guria; 1689	Succeeded by Mamia III Gurieli
