= Giorgi III =

Giorgi III may refer to:

- George III of Georgia (died in 1184)
- George III of Imereti (died in 1639)
- George III Gurieli (died in 1684)
