= Levan Gurieli =

Prince of Guria
- Reign: 1712–1713
- Predecessor: George IV Gurieli
- Successor: George IV Gurieli
- House: Gurieli
- Father: Mamia III Gurieli
- Mother: Elene Abashidze
- Religion: Georgian Orthodox Church

Levan Gurieli (Georgian: ლევან გურიელი) was the Prince of Guria from 1712 to 1713 and a son of Mamia III Gurieli.

In 1711, when Mamia III ascended the throne of the neighboring Kingdom of Imereti, he appointed Levan's older brother, George IV Gurieli, as governor of Guria. Levan opposed this decision. In 1712, with the assistance of the King of Imereti and the Ottoman Pasha of Akhaltsikhe, Levan seized the principal throne from his brother, triggering a civil conflict.

During this struggle, the Nakashidze, Machutadze, and Tavdgiridze families supported Levan Gurieli, while the Eristavi family backed George IV Gurieli. In 1713, George IV Gurieli mounted a counterattack and reclaimed the throne.
