= Don Cossack Region electoral district =

Electoral District in Russia

Don Cossack Region
- Former Civilian constituency for the All-Russian Constituent Assembly
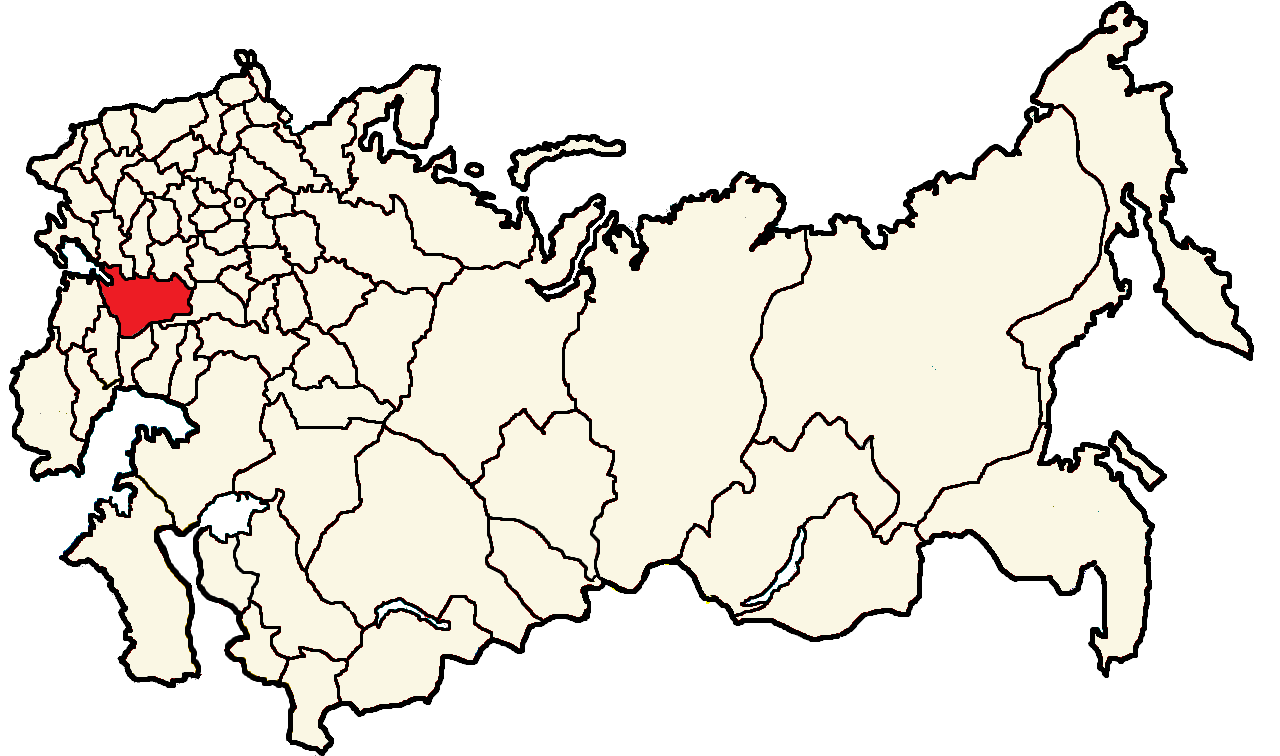

Former constituency
- Created: 1917
- Abolished: 1918
- Number of members: 19
- Number of Uyezd Electoral Commissions: 9
- Number of Urban Electoral Commissions: 3
- Number of Parishes: 283

The Don Cossack Region electoral district (Russian: Избирательный округ области войска Донского) was a constituency created for the 1917 Russian Constituent Assembly election.

The electoral district covered the Don Host Oblast. Originally assigned 17 seats, by decree of the Provisional Government the number of deputies of the Don Cossack Region district was increased to 19. The Provisional Government had provided a degree of autonomy to the Don region, recognizing the authority of the Cossacks over the land. In June 1917 General Alexey Kaledin was elected as ataman. The Kadets had sought to form a joint Kadet-Cossack list in the district, and a number of Kadet national leaders had visited the area ahead of the election. The effort failed, over differences of opinion on land ownership of non-Cossacks.

In Rostov-on-Don the Bolsheviks obtained 25,529 votes, Cossacks 14,248 votes and the Kadets 13,637 votes. In Nakhichevan-on-Don the Bolsheviks obtained 9,172 votes, Kadets 3,426 votes and Cossacks 2,556 votes. In Taganrog the Bolsheviks obtained 9,395 votes (41.7%), the SRs 4,383 votes (19.4%), the Cossacks 2,990 votes (13.3%), the Kadets 2,925 votes (13%), Mensheviks 2,436 votes (10.8%), the Popular Socialists 217 votes (0.9%), the Bloc of Socialists 126 votes (0.6%), the Landowners 49 votes (0.2%) and the Old Believers 17 votes (0.1%).

== Results ==
Don Cossack Region
Party	Vote	%	Seats
List 4 - Cossack	636,966	45.28	9
List 2 - Socialist-Revolutionaries	478,901	34.05	7
List 5 - Bolsheviks	205,497	14.61	3
List 6 - Kadets	43,345	3.08	
List 8 - Mensheviks	17,504	1.24	
List 3 - Old Believer	8,183	0.58	
List 1 - Bloc of Socialists (right-wing socialists, incl. Unity)	5,718	0.41	
List 9 - Landowners	5,457	0.39	
List 7 - Popular Socialists-Cooperative alliance	5,049	0.36	
Total:	1,406,620		19

Deputies Elected
Babin	SR
Kolesnikov	SR
Kurilov	SR
Mamonov	SR
Nikolaev	SR
Nikolsky	SR
Shvetsov	SR
Ageyev	Cossack
Arakantsev	Cossack
Bogaevsky	Cossack
Kaledin	Cossack
Kharlamov	Cossack
Melnikov	Cossack
Popov	Cossack
Ulanov	Cossack
Voronkov	Cossack
Lozovsky	Bolshevik
Syrtsov	Bolshevik
Vasilchenko	Bolshevik
