= Haidar Abashidze =

Georgian politician, journalist, and educator (1893–1965)

- ჰაიდარ აბაშიძე
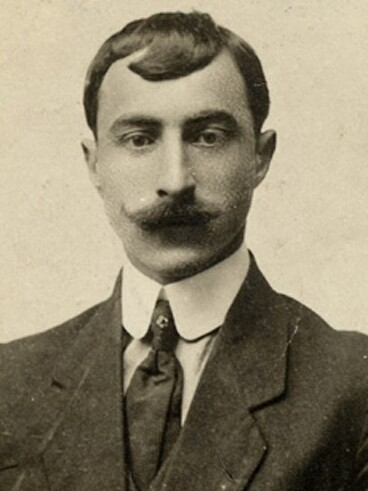
- Haidar Abashidze in 1916
- Born: August 15, 1893; Batum, Russian Empire
- Died: December 1965 (aged 72); Tbilisi, Georgian SSR, Soviet Union
- Occupations: Politician, journalist, educator

Haidar Abashidze (Georgian: ჰაიდარ აბაშიძე; 15 August 1893 – December 1965) was a Georgian politician, journalist, and educator from the Muslim community of Adjara.

Born in Batum, then part of the Russian Empire, of a Muslim Georgian noble family of the beys of Adjara, Abashidze studied at a local Georgian school and then at a college in Ottoman Turkey. In 1913 he began teaching at schools in Adjara and published in the local press, championing the pro-Georgian orientation among the Muslim Adjarains. He further sympathized with the social-democratic revolutionaries and was persecuted by the Russian government. Between 1918 and 1920, together with Mehmed Abashidze, he was a driving force behind the Liberation Committee of Muslim Georgia, an organization that was active during the Turkish and then British occupation of Batum, advocating incorporation of the region into a newly independent Georgia. After the Soviet takeover of Georgia, he withdrew from politics and died in Tbilisi in 1966. He was buried at the Didube Pantheon of Writers and Public Figures in Tbilisi.

Several authors, dealing with the World War I-era Caucasian affairs, confuse Haidar Abashidze with Prince Kita Abashidze, a Georgian Social Federalist and member of the Ozakom.

He died in December 1965. (Note: Despite the fact that the newspaper Zarya Vostoka announced his death on December 31, 1965, some sources erronously report that he died on January 3, 1966.)
