= Levan Abashidze (noble) =

Levan Abashidze (Georgian: ლევან აბაშიძე, pronounced [ˈlevan ˈabaʃidze]; died December 14, 1757) was a member of the Georgian countly family (tavadi) of Abashidze, prominent in the politics of the Kingdom of Imereti in the 18th century. He was the maternal grandfather of King Solomon I of Imereti, whom he fought and eventually met his death in the battle with Solomon's army at Khresili.

== Rise to power and involvement in civil wars ==
Levan Abashidze was a son of Giorgi-Malakia Abashidze, who seized the crown of Imereti in 1702 and was deposed in 1707. Prince Levan rose in prominence early in the reign of the young king Alexander V of Imereti in the 1720s, when he vied for influence with Bezhan Dadiani, Prince of Mingrelia and the father-in-law of Alexander. During a series of political intrigues and clan feuds plaguing Imereti, in 1726, Levan was dispossessed by Alexander of the fortress of Shorapani, which was then granted to Levan's relative and adversary Zurab Abashidze. After the death of Bezhan in 1728, Levan Abashidze's influence grew, and he married off his daughter Tamar to Alexander V as the king's second wife in 1732. Prince Levan fought on the side of Alexander against the powerful party of nobles led by Bezhan's son Otia Dadiani in a debilitating civil war, but he later fell afoul of his royal son-in-law, and the two clashed with their forces in 1745.

== Downfall ==
After Alexander V's death in 1751, Levan Abashidze opposed the accession of the royal heir, his own grandson Solomon I, who was briefly deposed in a coup which was supported even by the king's mother in 1752. Once Solomon regained the throne, he forced his mother and grandfather into exile and confiscated the Abashidze estates. In 1757, Levan, together with the influential Georgian grandee Rostom, Duke of Racha, joined an Ottoman army sent against Solomon. The royal army defeated the allies at Khresili, killing Levan Abashidze in battle.

== Ancestry ==
Ancestors of Levan Abashidze

8. Paata Abashidze
4. Paata Abashidze
9. Gulbuduakh Chkhetidze
2. Giorgi-Malakia Abashidze
1. Levan Abashidze
