= George IV Gurieli =

King of Imereti

Prince of Guria
- 1st reign: 1711–1713
- Predecessor: Mamia III Gurieli
- Successor: Mamia III Gurieli
- Anti-prince: Levan Gurieli (1712–1713)
- 2nd reign: 1714–1716
- Predecessor: Mamia III Gurieli
- Successor: Kaikhosro III Gurieli
- Reign: 1717–1726
- Predecessor: Kaikhosro III Gurieli
- Successor: Mamia IV Gurieli

King of Imereti
- Reign: 1716
- Predecessor: George VI
- Successor: George VI
- Died: 1726
- Spouse: Mariam Sharvashidze (div. 1717) Khvaramze Dadiani (m. 1717)
- Issue: Mamia IV Gurieli; George V Gurieli
- House: Gurieli
- Father: Mamia III Gurieli
- Mother: Elene Abashidze
- Religion: Georgian Orthodox Church (Catholicate of Abkhazia)

George IV Gurieli (Georgian: გიორგი IV გურიელი, romanized: giorgi IV gurieli; died 1726), of the House of Gurieli, was Prince of Guria from 1711 to 1726, and a king of Imereti in western Georgia in 1716. He was installed as regent of Guria by his father, Mamia III Gurieli, then the king of Imereti, in 1712. In 1716, he seized the crown of Imereti, but was forced to abandon the enterprise later that year. Returning to Guria, his rule was challenged by a faction of local nobility, which included his mother Elene and brother Kaikhosro III Gurieli. He was finally able to crush the opposition after making peace with Bezhan Dadiani, Prince of Mingrelia.

== Early rule ==
George was the eldest son of Mamia III Gurieli, Prince of Guria, and Princess Elene Abashidze, daughter of Prince Giorgi-Malakia Abashidze. When Mamia seized the throne of Imereti in October 1712, George was made by his father as regent of Guria to the opposition of his younger brother, Levan Gurieli. On Mamia's death on 5 January 1714, George Gurieli became prince-regnant. In 1716, the Imeretian opposition led by Bezhan Dadiani, Prince of Mingrelia, and Prince Zurab Abashidze invited the Ottoman troops in their successful bid to depose King George VI of Imereti, the late Mamia Gurieli's rival, and crowned George Gurieli as king at Kutaisi. His reign lasted for only three months; the dethroned king George VI's Rachian supporters ambushed and looted Gurieli's treasure, bound to Kutaisi, at Salominao, while a Gurian escort were captured and sold in slavery. The alarmed Gurieli fled Kutaisi back to Guria, while Imereti was divided by Dadiani, Abashidze, and the duke of Racha.

== Coup in Guria ==
Back in his native principality, George Gurieli faced a coup engineered by his own mother, Elene, on whose instigation Dadiani, Abashidze, and the duke of Racha intervened with their troops to expel George and replace him with his younger brother, Kaikhosro III Gurieli, the unfrocked monk and Elene's favorite son. George fled to Akhlatsikhe under the protection of an Ottoman pasha. There he met his exiled predecessor as king of Imereti, George VI, who married Gurieli's sister Tamar. Akhaltsikhe's own power struggle deprived the two Georges of any meaningful support. Gurieli moved to Erzurum and, with the troops provided by the local pasha, quickly reconquered Guria, forcing his mother and brothers into exile.

The leading nobles of Guria, such as Eristavi and Bezhan Nakashidze did not welcome George's comeback and invoked Bezhan Dadiani's military aid to put Gurieli into flight to Batumi. Dadiani looted Guria and left. Gurieli was able to resume his reign and made peace with Dadiani. He then moved against his estranged nobles, expelled Eristavi, and took away Giorgi Nakashidze's wife, a daughter of Dadiani, as his own mate with her father's consent. George Gurieli died in 1726. He was succeeded by his son, Mamia IV Gurieli.

== Family ==
George IV Gurieli was married twice. His first marriage was to Mariam Sharvashidze, whom he divorced in 1717. Following their divorce, George married Khvaramze, the daughter of Bezhan Dadiani and the former wife of Prince Giorgi Nakashidze. After Gurieli's death, Khvaramze married Shoshita III, Duke of Racha. George had two sons:

- Mamia IV Gurieli (died 1784), Prince of Guria, who reigned intermittently between 1726 and 1776;
- George V Gurieli (died 1788), Prince of Guria, who reigned multiple times (1756–1758, 1765–1771, and 1776–1788).

== Bibliography ==
- Chkhataraishvili, Kveli (1959). გურიის სამთავრო : პოლიტიკური და სოციალურ-ეკონომიური ისტორიის ნარკვევი (in Georgian).

George IV Gurieli House of Gurieli
Regnal titles
| Preceded by Mamia III Gurieli | Prince of Guria; 1714–1716 | Succeeded by Kaikhosro III Gurieli |
| Preceded by George VI | King of Imereti; 1716 | Succeeded by George VI |
| Preceded by Kaikhosro III Gurieli | Prince of Guria; 1717–1726 | Succeeded by Mamia IV Gurieli |
