= Paata Abashidze =

Paata Abashidze (Georgian: პაატა აბაშიძე; died 1684) was a member of the Georgian princely family (tavadi) of Abashidze, prominent in the politics of the kingdom of Imereti in the 17th century.

== Biography ==
Paata Abashidze was born to Prince Paata Abashidze and his wife, Princess Gulbudakh Chkhetidze. He succeeded as the head of the house of Abashidze and prince of Saabashidzo in Upper Imereti on the death of his father in 1658. At that time, the kingdom of Imereti was plagued by a civil war in which neighboring Georgian polities were also involved. In 1661, Abashidze allied himself with Vakhtang V, a Mukhranian king of Kartli in eastern Georgia, who pushed for the efforts to install his son Archil II as king in Imereti, an endeavor which eventually ended in failure.

Abashidze's influence grew during the reign of Alexander IV, whose sister Darejan, a former wife of ex-king George Gurieli, he married in 1683. Paata Abashidze became a major supporter of Alexander in a renewed civil war in 1684, when George Gurieli attempted to reclaim the crown of Imereti in alliance with Shoshita III, Duke of Racha, Giorgi Lipartiani, regent of Mingrelia, the princes Chijavadze and the nobles of Lechkhumi. The decisive battle at Rokiti ended in Alexander's victory and claimed lives of his major foes, George Gurieli and Shoshita of Racha. Paata Abashidze died soon thereafter of complicated wounds suffered at the battle.

After Abashidze's death, his widow, Darejan, married Papuna II, Duke of Racha, as her third husband, in 1685. Paata and Darejan had no children. Paata Abashidze's younger brother, Giorgi-Malakia Abashidze, would later become king of Imereti.
