= Paata =

Paata may refer to:

- Paata (island), island in Faichuk, Chuuk State, Federated States of Micronesia
- Paata (name), Georgian masculine given name
- Pluriarc, also called "paata", West African musical instrument
