= Dgebuadze =

Dgebuadze (Georgian: დგებუაძე) is a Georgian surname, which may mean:

- Dgebuadze (noble family), a noble family in Georgia
- Alexandre Dgebuadze (born 1971), a Belgian chess grandmaster
- Leon Dgebuadze (1897-1924), a Georgian politician shot in the Red Terror
- Mariam Dgebuadze-Pularia (1887-1969), a Georgian female writer
- Vladimeri Dgebuadze (born 1970), a Georgian judoka
