= Iotam Bagration =

Georgian prince

Iotam Bagration (Georgian: იოთამ ბაგრატიონი) was a Georgian royal prince (batonishvili) of the Bagrationi dynasty of House of Mukhrani branch. Iotam was son of Prince Vakhushti of Kartli.
