= Ivan Guryelov =

Russian general (1770–1818)

Prince (knyaz) Ivan Stepanovich Gurielov (Иван Степанович Гурьелов) also known as Guryalov (Гурьялов) or Gurieli (Гуриэли; Georgian: გურიელი) (1770–1818) was a Russian general of Georgian origin who fought in several campaigns, most notably in the 1812-14 wars against Napoleon I of France.

Gurielov came from the princely dynasty of Gurieli, which ruled Guri, a small region on Georgia's Black Sea coast. His grandfather, Kaikhosro III, who had briefly ruled Guria in 1716–1717, retired to Russia with King Vakhtang VI in 1724 and then served in the Georgian Hussar Regiment.

Ivan Gurieli enrolled in the Russian army in 1780 and received the rank of praporshchik in 1786. He took part in the Russo-Turkish War (1787–92) and the Polish campaign (1794). He was promoted to colonel on 25 June 1799, and to major general on 16 May 1803. He served as a commander of Volinsky musketeer regiment (1803–05) and a commandant of Vilno (now Vilnius, Lithuania) (1808–12). During Napoleon's invasion of Russia (1812), he led the Yekaterinburgsky Infantry Regiment and then the 1st Brigade within the 23rd Infantry Division and assumed the command of the same division after the Battle of Borodino. He took part in the battles of Tarutino, Vyazma (1812), Bautzen and Leipzig (1813). During the Battle of Paris (1814), he was the first of the allied commanders to assail the Montmartre Heights. Since 1816, Gurielov served as a commander of the 27th Division.
