= Description of the Kingdom of Georgia =

1745 work describing the kingdom of Georgia

The Description of the Kingdom of Georgia, the habits and canons of Georgia (Georgian: აღწერა სამეფოსა საქართველოსა, ზნენი და ჩვეულებანი საქართველოსანი, romanized: aghts'era sameposa sakartvelosa, zneni da chveulebani sakartvelosani) also known as Description of the Kingdom of Georgia is the work written by prince royal Vakhushti of Kartli that was completed on 20 October 1745 in Moscow. The work thoroughly describes the geography of Georgia, its regions and peoples, and narrates the history of Georgia from its origin to the first half of the 18th century. The work was inscribed on UNESCO's Memory of the World international register in 2013.
