= Phinez Abashidze =

Georgian nobleman of the House of Abashidze

Phinez Abashidze (Georgian: ფინეზ აბაშიძე, romanized: pinez abashidze) was a Georgian nobleman of the House of Abashidze and the eldest son of Giorgi-Malakia Abashidze, who later ruled as King George V of Imereti.

In the oath book of 1658–1676, Phinez is the only son listed alongside his father. A subsequent document from 1663 lists Giorgi-Malakia with two sons, Phinez and his brother Paata. Giorgi-Malakia had his other sons after this period.

Phinez had two sons, Nikoloz and Rostom. Nikoloz is mentioned in 1753, 1762, and 1817, while Rostom is mentioned in 1801. In 1762, Nikoloz sold Chkheri Fortress to King Solomon I of Imereti. Rostom's son, Nikoloz Phinezishvili-Abashidze, was one of the leaders of the Imeretian uprising of 1819–1820.

The descendants of Phinez were known by the surnames Abashidze-Phinezishvili, Phinezishvili-Abashidze, and Phinezishvili.

== Bibliography ==
- Soselia, Olgha (1973). ნარკვევები ფეოდალური ხანის დასავლეთ საქართველოს სოციალურ-პოლიტიკური ისტორიიდან : სათავადოები : წიგნი I (in Georgian). Tbilisi: Metsniereba.
