= George VI of Imereti =

18th-century King of Imereti

George VII

King of Imereti
- 1st reign: 1703–1711
- Predecessor: George V Abashidze
- Successor: Mamia III Gurieli
- Anti-king: George V Abashidze (1703–1707)
- 2nd reign: 1712–1713
- Predecessor: Mamia III Gurieli
- Successor: Mamia III Gurieli
- 3rd reign: 1714–1716
- Predecessor: Mamia III Gurieli
- Successor: George IV Gurieli
- 4th reign: 1719–1720
- Predecessor: George IV Gurieli
- Successor: Alexander V
- Died: 27 February 1720
- Spouse: Rodam of Kartli (m. 1703; div. 1714) Tamar of Racha (m. 1714; died 1714) Tamar Gurieli (m. 1716)
- Issue Among others: Alexander V of Imereti; Mamuka of Imereti; George VII of Imereti
- Dynasty: Bagrationi
- Father: Alexander IV of Imereti
- Mother: Daughter of a didebuli
- Religion: Georgian Orthodox Church (Catholicate of Abkhazia)

George VI (Georgian: გიორგი VII, romanized: giorgi VII; alternatively known as George VII; died 27 February 1720), of the Bagrationi dynasty, was king (mepe) of Imereti (western Georgia) in the periods of 1703–1711, 1712–1713, 1714–1716, and 1719–1720.

== Reign ==
George was a illegitimate son of Alexander IV of Imereti. In 1703, George VI was crowned king with Ottoman support. However, Imereti was effectively governed by Giorgi-Malakia Abashidze, who, according to the established tradition in Georgian historiography, is regarded as George V. George VI was supported by the royal house of Kartli and a large part of the Imeretian nobility. In 1707, George VI defeated Abashidze and temporarily consolidated his rule. In October 1711, a noble revolt deposed him in favor of Mamia III Gurieli who forced George to retire to Kartli, eastern Georgia. Later, with the support of the Turkish pasha of Akhaltsikhe, he defeated Mamia at the Battle of Chkhara in June 1712. Deposed again in November 1713, George resumed the throne upon Mamia's death in January 1714, only to be forced, in 1716, by the rebellious nobles led by Prince Bejan Dadiani into exile to Constantinople. George succeeded in garnering the Ottoman support, and regained the crown in 1719.

Yet, his reign proved to be short-lived; in February 1720, he was assassinated by the plotters led by Prince Simon Abashidze.

== Family ==
George first married in 1703 to Rodam (fl. 1703–1730), daughter of George XI from his marriage to Khoreshan, daughter of the Imeretian Prince George Mikeladze. They had five children:

- Alexander V of Imereti (1704–1752), King of Imereti (r. 1720–1752);
- an unnamed daughter, who married David (died 1740), son of Prince Zurab Abashidze;
- Mamuka of Imereti (fl. 1715–1769), King of Imereti (r. 1746–1749);
- Princess Tuta (fl. 1738), who married Papuna Chichua (fl. 1738);
- an unnamed daughter (fl. 1735), who married Mamuka, Prince of Mukhrani.

George married secondly in 1714 to Tamar (died 1714), daughter of Papuna II, Duke of Racha, and former wife of Papuna Mkheidze and Mamia III Gurieli. The marriage was childless. Tamar died later that year and was buried at Gelati Monastery.

George married thirdly in 1716 to Tamar (died 1742), daughter of Mamia III Gurieli and former wife of George IV Dadiani. They had three children:

- George VII of Imereti (1718–1778), King of Imereti (r. 1741);
- Princess Ana (fl. 1727), who married Zaal (fl. 1727–1770), son of Prince Christopher Eristavi-Sharvashidze;
- Prince Rostom (fl. 1746).

== Bibliography ==
- Toumanoff, Cyril (1976). Manuel de Généalogie et de Chronologie pour l'histoire de la Caucasie chrétienne (Arménie, Géorgie, Albanie) [Manual of Genealogy and Chronology of Christian Caucasian History (Armenia, Georgia, Albania)] (in French). Rome: Edizioni Aquila.

Preceded by George V	King of Imereti; 1703–1711	Succeeded by Mamia III Gurieli
Preceded by Mamia III Gurieli	King of Imereti; 1712–1713	Succeeded by Mamia III Gurieli
Preceded by Mamia III Gurieli	King of Imereti; 1714–1716	Succeeded by George IV Gurieli
Preceded by George IV Gurieli	King of Imereti; 1719–1720	Succeeded by Alexander V
