= Ivan Bagration =

Ivan Vakhushtovich Bagration (Russian: Иван Вахуштович Багратион; Georgian: ივანე ვახუშტისძე ბაგრატიონი, Ivane Vakhushtisdze Bagrationi) (1725 – 25 December 1781) was an Imperial Russian general of Georgian royal origin, born in the émigré royal family of Kartli.

== Biography ==
Ivan was a son of Prince Vakhushti of Kartli, a notable scholar, by his wife Princess Mariam Abashidze. He was, thus, a grandson of two monarchs: Vakhtang VI on his father's side and George V of Imereti on his mother's side. Prince Bagration was commissioned as an officer of the Russian army in 1749. He took part in the Seven Years' War and the Russo-Turkish War of 1768–74 and then commanded corps in Siberia. He was promoted to major-general in 1777 and general-poruchik in 1778, and decorated with the Order of St. George, 4th Class, in 1778. Bagration died in 1781. He is buried at the Annunciation Monastery in Nizhyn, Ukraine.
