= Michael Papadjanian =

Armenian revolutionary

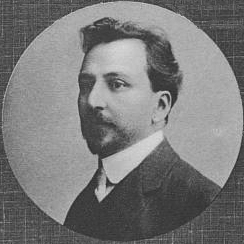
Michael Papadjanian

Michael Papadjanian, or Mikayel (1868 in Yerevan, Armenia – 1929 in Tiflis, Soviet Union) was a member of the Armenian national liberation movement who studied law at Rostov, Odessa and St Petersburg, and had a practice as a barrister at Baku.

He was a member of Armenian national activities during the Armenian–Tatar massacres 1905-1907. He married an oil heiress in 1907. He became an Armenian member of the Fourth State Duma in 1912. He was also elected to become a member of the Ozakom, March 1917. He established the eastern equivalent of the Ramkavars under the name Zhoghovrdakan (Populist) party in 1917. He participated in the Russian Armenian National Congress, October 1917; he and the other members of the Ozakom were criticized for ineffectiveness. He participated in the negotiation of the Treaty of Batum on May–June 1918 and signed the treaty.

After the declaration of the Democratic Republic of Armenia, he was assigned to the Paris Peace Conference as a member of the delegation of the Republic of Armenia; he became a member of the central executive of the Armenian General Benevolent Union. In 1929, he was delegated by his party to discuss the re-establishment of ties between Eastern and Western Armenians with the Soviet Armenian government.
