= Prince Vakhushti of Kartli =

Georgian prince (1696–1757)

Vakhushti
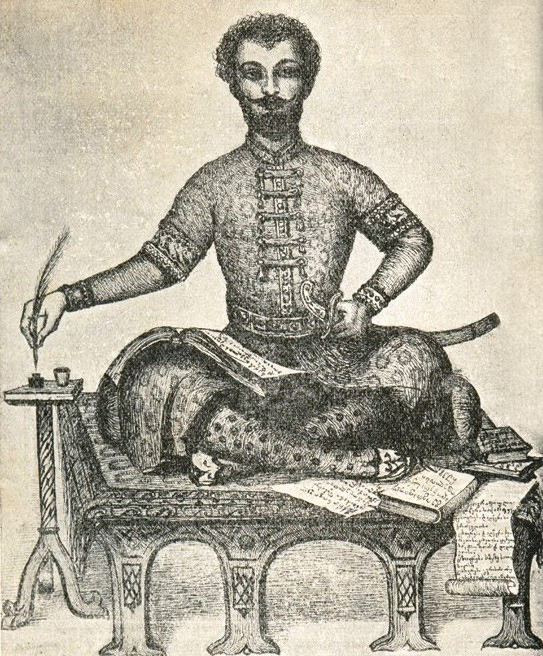
- Born: 1696
- Died: 1757 (aged 60–61); Moscow, Russian Empire
- Burial: Donskoy Monastery
- Spouse: Mariam Abashidze
- Issue Among others: Ioane; Iotam
- Dynasty: Bagrationi
- Father: Vakhtang VI
- Religion: Georgian Orthodox Church

Vakhushti (Georgian: ვახუშტი; c. 1696 – 1757) was a Georgian royal prince (batonishvili), geographer, historian and cartographer. His principal historical and geographic works, Description of the Kingdom of Georgia and the Geographical Atlas, were inscribed on UNESCO's Memory of the World Programme in 2013.

== Life ==
Born as a royal bastard, son of King Vakhtang VI (r. 1716–1724), he was born in Tbilisi, 1696. Educated by the Garsevanishvili brothers and a Roman Catholic mission, he was fluent in Greek, Latin, French, Turkish, Russian and Armenian.

His name Vakhushti derives from Old Iranian vahišta- ("paradise", superlative of veh "good", i.e., "superb, excellent"). Its equivalent in Middle Persian is wahišt and in New Persian behešt.

In 1719 and 1720, he participated in two successive campaigns against the rebel Shanshe, Duke of Ksani. From August to November 1722, he served as a governor of the kingdom during his father's absence, when his father was engaged in the Ganja campaign. Later, he served as a commander in Kvemo Kartli. After the Ottoman occupation of Kartli, he followed King Vakhtang in his emigration to the Russian Empire in 1724. Retired to Moscow, Tsarevich Vakhusht (as he came to be known in Russia) was granted a pension. He died in Moscow in 1757. He was buried at the Donskoy Monastery in Moscow, a traditional burial ground of Georgian emigrant royalty and nobility.

== Works ==
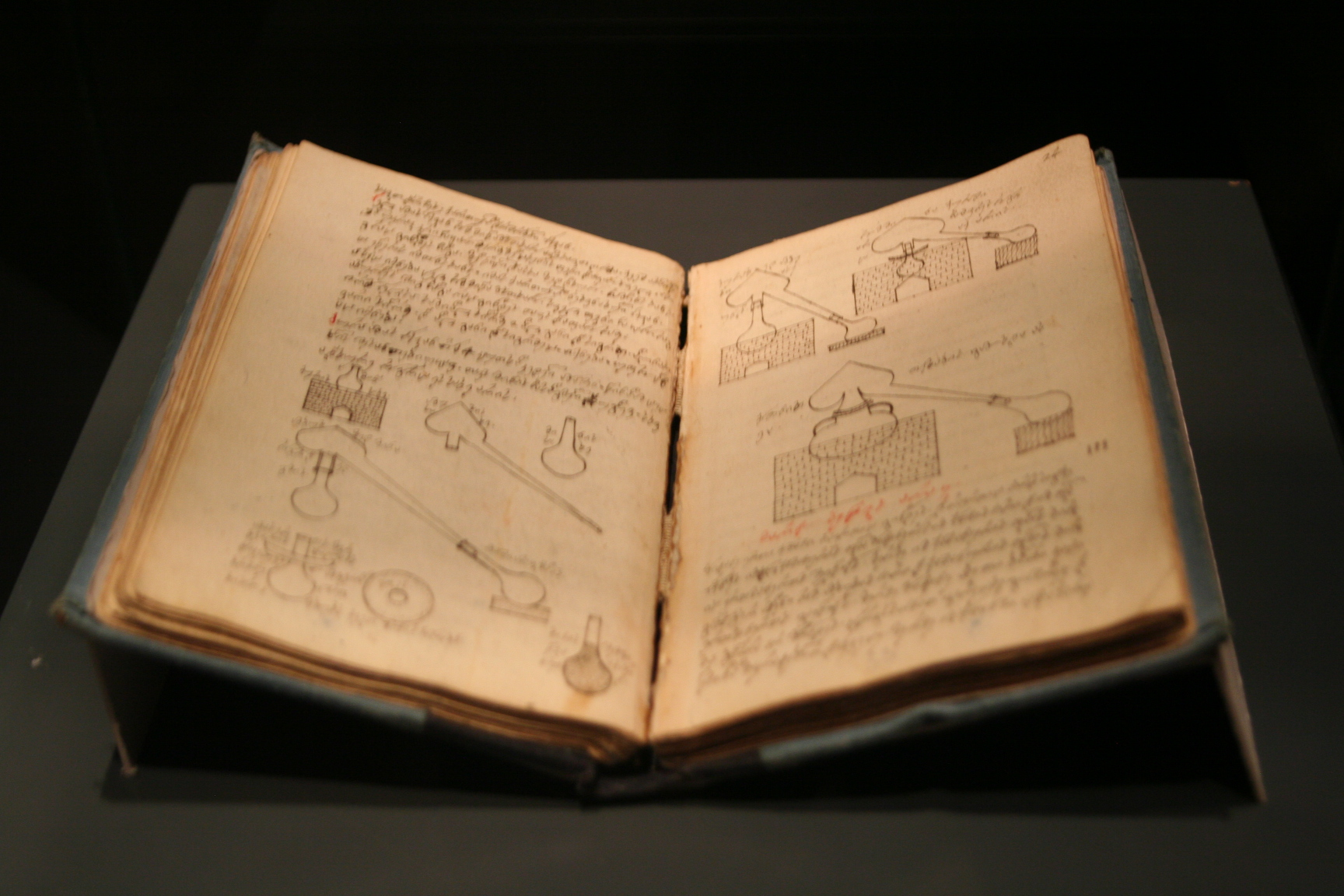
Book of Chemistry by Vakhtang VI. Manuscript of the 1740s (copied by Prince Vakhushti). Simon Janashia Museum of Georgia

Most of his works were written or completed in Moscow. The best known are Description of the Kingdom of Georgia (completed in 1745), The Geographic Description of Georgia (completed in 1750) and two geographic atlases of the Caucasus region accompanied by the images of several historic coats of arms (1745–46).

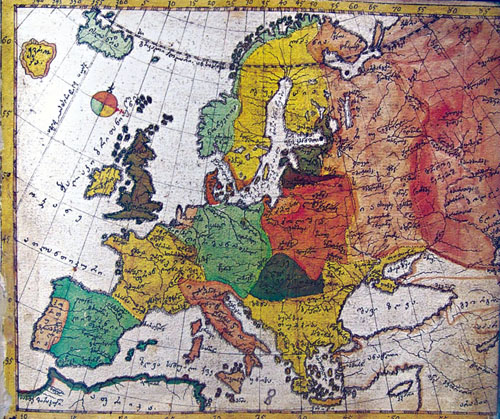
Map of Europe by Vakhushti Bagrationi, 1752

His famous Description of the Kingdom of Georgia is essentially an adorned synopsis of the initial texts of the corpus of medieval Georgian annals, Kartlis Tskhovreba. Vakhushti was critical of the re-edition of the corpus assembled by a scholarly commission chaired by his father Vakhtang VI. So as to rectify perceived oversights of Vakhtang's version, Vakhushti compiled his own comprehensive history and geographical description of the Georgian people and lands. One of the chief goals of his corrective was to underscore all-Georgian political and cultural unity despite the fact that Georgia was politically divided among competing kings and princes during Vakhushti's lifetime. The popularity of Vakhushti's tome is evidenced by the many copies made of it, and his narrative significantly shaped the way in which subsequent generations have conceived of an all-Georgian past. It is also a major source on the Georgian history of the 16th and 17th centuries.

Vakhushti's works were soon translated into Russian and later into French and served as a guide to many contemporary European scholars and travellers to the Caucasus up to the early 20th century.

He also completed, together with his brother, Prince Bakar, the printing of the Bible in Georgian, which had been only partly done by their father, Vakhtang VI. He established for that purpose, in his house near Moscow, a printing press, taught the art of printing to several Georgian clergymen, and completed the first printed edition of the Bible in Georgian in 1743. The printing press was afterwards transferred to Moscow, where several religious works in Georgian were printed.

== Family ==
Vakhushti was married to Mariam, daughter of George Abashidze. Their children were:

- Prince Ioane (died 1781), general in the Russian service;
- Prince Iotam (fl. 1737);
- Prince Petre (fl. 1737);
- Princess Alexandra (12 August 1721 – 8 April 1789);
- Princess Guka (fl. 1737).
- Prince David (1723–1819);
- Princess Mariam (1724–1807);
- Prince Nikoloz (died 6 November 1784);
- Prince Domenti (1728–1737);
- Princess Ana (1744–1779).

== See also ==
- Bagrationi dynasty
- Bakar of Kartli
- Prince George of Kartli
