= Vasily Kharlamov =

Russian politician

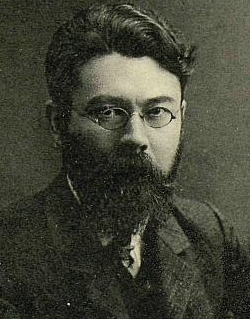
Vasily Kharlamov, 1910

Vasily Akimovich Kharlamov (Russian: Васи́лий Аки́мович Харла́мов) (1 January 1875 – 13 March 1957) was a Russian politician involved in the revolution and civil war.

Kharlamov, of the Don Cossacks, was a member of the Constitutional Democratic Party and was elected to all four State Dumas of the Russian Empire. After the 1917 February Revolution, the Russian Provisional Government made him a chair of the ephemeral Special Transcaucasian Committee (Ozakom) in 1917. Later, Kharlamov headed the Government of the Union of South-Eastern Cossack troops, Caucasus Mountaineers and Free Peoples of the Steppe. During the Russian Civil War, he emerged as one of the leaders of the Don White movement.

After the Bolshevik victory in the war, Kharlamov fled abroad. He died in Buenos Aires, Argentina, leaving memoirs of the civil war years.
