= Paata Shamugia =

Georgian poet (born 1983)

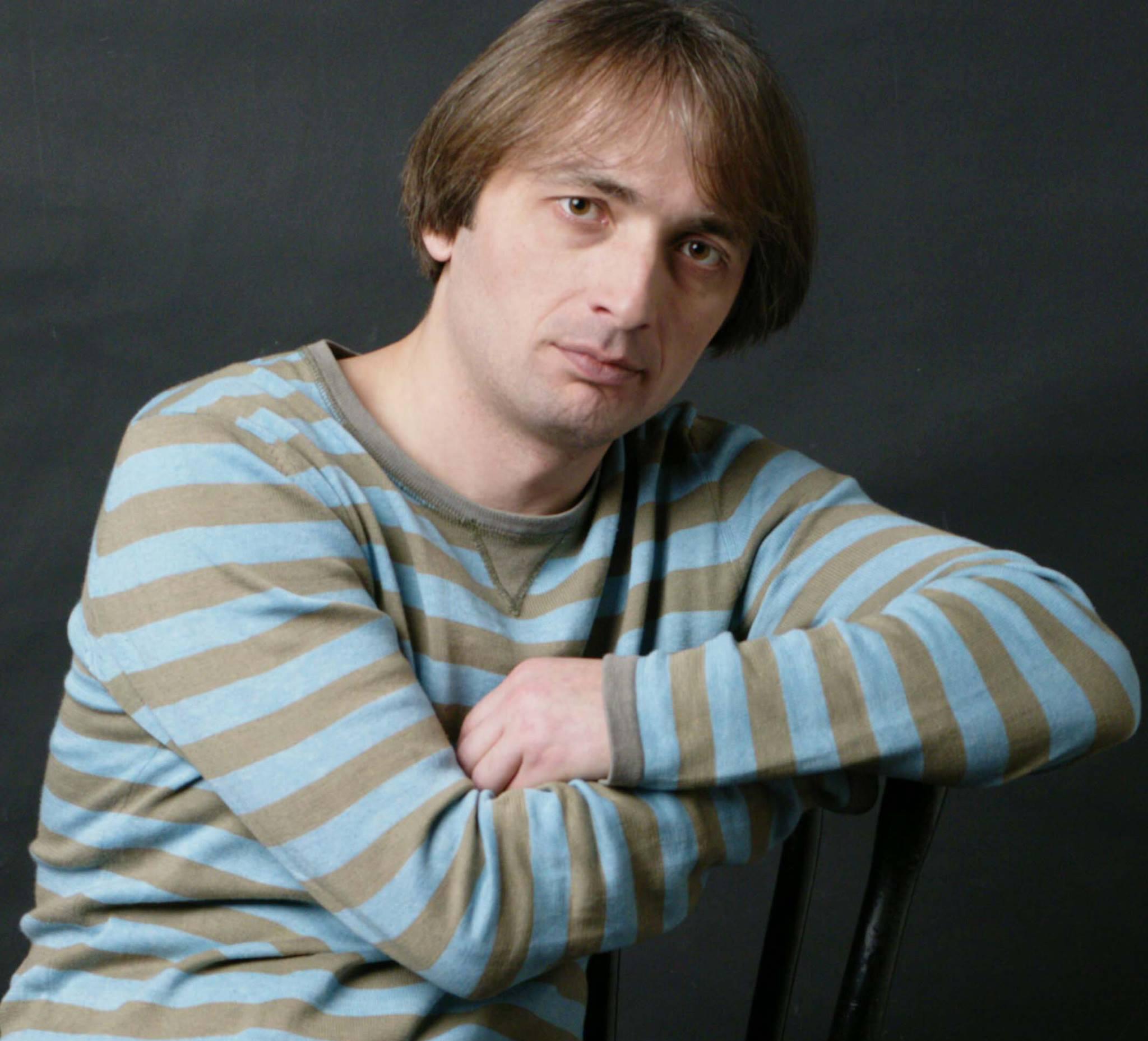
Paata Shamugia - born March 1983

Paata Shamugia (in Georgian: პაატა შამუგია) is a Georgian poet. His texts, according to Georgian literary scholars, include a large amount of self-irony and sometimes strange linguistic performances. In 2015 he became the first Georgian poet to be awarded the SABA Georgian National Literature Prize twice.

After publishing his début poem "Panther's Skin" in 2006 (in which he referenced the so-called "Georgian Bible", the poem The Knight in the Panther's Skin), he gained the attention of the Georgian public. The book sparked controversy in the Georgian press and several Georgian parliament members wanted the book banned because they thought it was harmful and disrespectful to tradition. Members of the Radical Orthodox Parents’ Union published a letter about Shamugia in the newspaper Asaval-Dasavali, in which they asked the Georgian Orthodox Church to pronounce him an anathema.

In 2010, Shamugia published the book Preference, which was well-received by critics.

In 2015, the publishing-house INTELEKTI published Shamugia's book Schizo-National Poems, for which he received the Saba Literary Prize of Georgia for the second time. The Greek translation became a bestseller, and the Greek Esquire magazine included it in the ten favourite books of Greek readers.

== Biography ==
Paata Shamugia was born in Gali, Abkhazia, in 1983 year and graduated from the philological faculty at Tbilisi State University. In 2018-2022 Shamugia has been the president of PEN International Georgia.

Shamugia's poems have been translated into more than 20 languages.

== Awards and recognition ==
- 2012 - Shamugia won the SABA Georgian National Literature Prize, and his book Acatiste was named as the best book of the year.
- 2012 - The art magazine Hot Chocolate named Shamugia the person of the year.
- 2015 - Shamugia won the SABA Georgian National Literature Prize for the second time and his book Schizo-National Poems was named the best book of the year.
- 2019 - Shamugia was on the jury for the European Union Prize for Literature.
- 2022 - Schizo-National Poems, translated into French as Schizo-poèmes by Boris Bachana Chabradzé, was a finalist for the Prix Mallarmé étranger.
