= Battle of Khresili =

1757 battle between the Ottoman Empire and the Kingdom of Imereti

Coordinates: 46.635417°N 32.616867°E

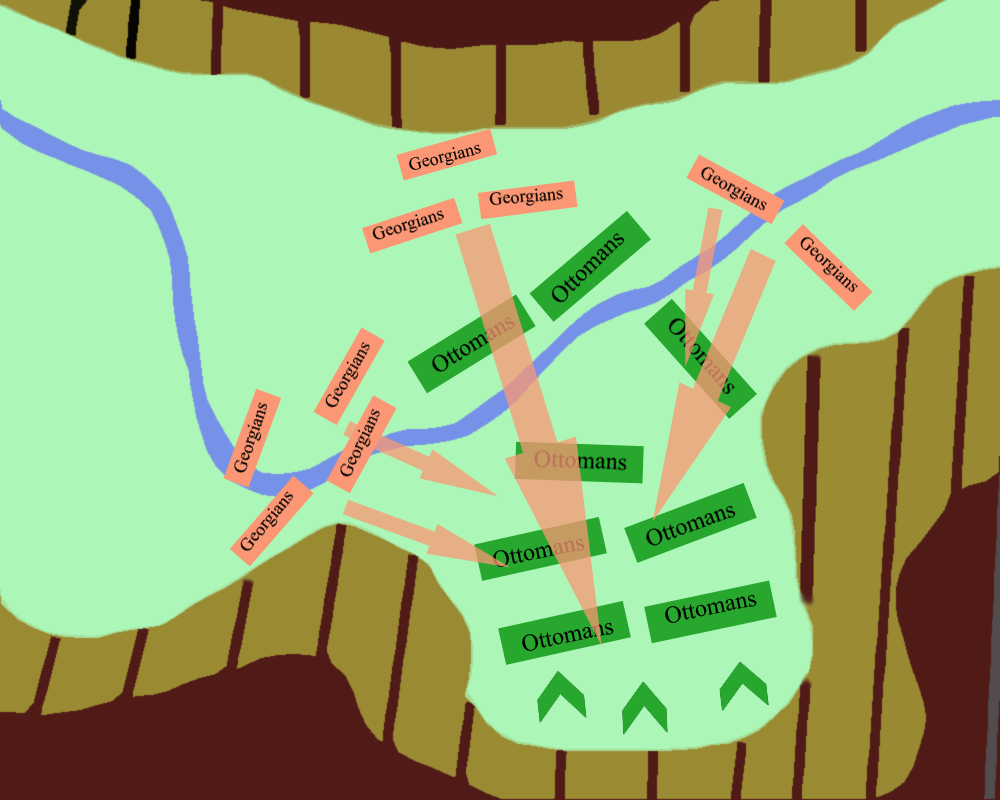
- The general representation of the positions.
Date	December 14, 1757
Location	Near Khresili, Ottoman Empire
Result	Georgian victory

Belligerents
Kingdom of Imereti: Principality of Mingrelia; Principality of Guria; Principality of Abkhazia (Samurzakano)	Ottoman Empire

Commanders and leaders
Solomon I of Imereti; Katsia II Dadiani; Mamia IV Gurieli; Khutunia Sharvashidze †; Papuna Tsereteli; Beri Tsulukidze; Prince Archil; Beso Lortkipanidze; Kaikhosro Agiashvili; Giorgi Abashidze; Zurab Mikeladze	Gola Pasha †; Kemkha Pasha †; Levan Abashidze †; Rostom, Duke of Racha; Pasha of Poti; Pasha of Kutaisi; Barons of Tsutskvati, Baghdati and Shorapani.

Strength
11,000 main troops; 5,000 additional forces; Total: 16,000 men (Georgian claim)	30,000 Ottoman army; 15,000 Ottoman soldiers garrisoned in Imereti; 10,000 pro-Ottoman Georgian rebels; Total: 55,000 men (Georgian claim)

Casualties and losses
Fewer casualties(Georgian claim)	38,000–45,000 (Georgian claim)

The Battle of Khresili (Georgian: ხრესილის ბრძოლა, Turkish: Hresili Muharebesi) was fought on December 14, 1757, between the armies of the Kingdom of Imereti and the Ottoman Empire. King Solomon I of Imereti established a strong monarchy and unified western Georgia. His actions strained the relations between him and the Ottoman Empire. The Ottomans, in particular, sought to stop Solomon's struggle against slavery. They were in an alliance with rebellious Georgian nobles who opposed their monarch. One of them was Levan Abashidze, who led an Ottoman army to the Kingdom of Imereti. Solomon enticed his enemies into a strategically adroit place near Khresili where his forces would gather to engage them.

== Background ==
In the 17th century, western Georgia was a vassal of the Ottoman Empire. Ottoman garrisons were dispatched to Tsutskvati, Poti, and Shorapani fortresses. Realizing that Georgia was facing the threat of heavy depopulation, the King of Imereti, Solomon I, prohibited slavery, opposing turncoat lords and wanting independence from the Ottoman Empire. The Ottoman Sultan sent Gola Pasha with a large army to punish Solomon I and re-establish Ottoman rule over the Kingdom of Imereti. The Turkish force of 30,000, led by Seraskir Pasha, awaited Solomon I by the city of Akhaltsikhe. Solomon was informed of the arrival of the Ottomans, and he immediately gave out orders. Kaikhosro Agiashvili would take control over the Fortress of Baghdati. The king's brother, Archil, alongside Giorgi Abashidze would seize the Shorapani Fortress, Beso Lortkipanidze would besiege the Capital, Kutaisi. Zurab Mikeladze, would blockade the road from Poti which goes through the Principality of Guria in order to stall the advance of the Pasha of Poti. Papuna Tsereteli, Beri Tsulukidze, Kacia Dadiani and Khutunia Shervashidze with a force of 11,000 troops would await King Solomon I. The location of the battle was chosen as the valley of Khresili within Tkibuli.

== Battle ==
The Georgians launched their attack in the early morning of December 14, 1757. The advancing Ottoman army was concentrated and cornered where king Solomon wanted them. The assault was well prepared. Being smaller in size, the Georgian force had to compensate with a superior position, higher morale and determination in order to repulse the invading Turks. King Solomon personally led his army's charge, eventually reaching Gola Pasha himself and reportedly decapitating him. The Turks panicked and tried to escape. But their leader, Abashidze restored their moral and they returned to battle. However soon Abashidze was killed by Georgian soldier Gegela Tevdoradze (later he was called Gegelashvili). Seeing the death of their commanders, the Ottoman army finally started to rout en masse and the Georgians proceeded to beat them. A large part of the Ottoman army was destroyed and captured, while some managed to escape. In the battle of Khresili, the commanders of the Ottoman force, Gola Pasha, Kemkha Pasha and Levan Abashidze were all killed.

The Ottomans never recovered from the massive loss of manpower. Two further attempts to invade Imereti after this battle were conducted with smaller armies of 20,000 and 13,000 soldiers, and while they were still numerically superior to Solomon I's small army, those were defeated as well.

== Strategic ramifications ==
After the battle of Khresili, in 1758-1766, the Ottomans attacked Imereti many times, but they could not subjugate Solomon I. The Ottomans were eventually forced to sign a treaty with the kingdom of Imereti, which stated that Imereti was no longer an Ottoman vassal but a kingdom under Ottoman protection. The only remnant of past Ottoman glory in this treaty was an annual tribute of 60 women (of any ethnic origin, not necessarily Georgians), which King Solomon failed to honor anyway.
