= Special Transcaucasian Committee =

1917 Russian political committee

Special Transcaucasian Committee Специальный Закавказский комитет (Russian) Osobyi Zakavkazskii Komitet სპეციალური ამიერკავკასიის კომიტეტი (Georgian) sp’etsialuri amierk’avk’asiis k’omit’et’i
- Autonomous area of Russia
- 1917
- Flag

- Capital: Tiflis (now Tbilisi)
- Government
  - Type: Autonomous committee of the Provisional Government
- Chairman
  - 1917: Vasily Kharlamov
- History
  - Established: 9 March 1917
  - Transcaucasian Commissariat declared: 11 November 1917
| Preceded by | Succeeded by |
| Russian Empire; Caucasus Viceroyalty (1801–1917) | Transcaucasian Commissariat |

The Special Transcaucasian Committee (Russian: Особый Закавказский Комитет Osobyi Zakavkazskii Komitet (OZaKom, Ozakom or OZAKOM)) was established on March 9, 1917, after the February Revolution, with Member of the State Duma Vasily Kharlamov as Chairman, to replace the Imperial Viceroy Grand Duke Nikolai Nikolaevich and with special instruction to establish civil administrations in areas occupied in the course of the war on the Caucasian front by the Russian Provisional Government in the Transcaucasus as the highest organ of the civil administrative body. Commissars were appointed for the Terek Oblast and the Kuban Oblast, and these as well as the Committee were to carry on relations with central government institutions through a Commissar for Caucasian Affairs in Petrograd attached to the Provisional Government.

Soviets also sprang up throughout the area and, in time, organized an influential Regional Center at Tiflis, using the loyalty of the Russian Armenians. Hakob Zavriev was instrumental in having Ozakom issue a decree about the administration of the occupied territories. This region was officially identified as "the land of Turkish Armenia" and transferred to a civilian rule under Zavriev, who oversaw districts Trebizon, Erzurum, Bitlis, and Van. Each of the districts under Administration for Western Armenia had their own Armenian governor, with Armenian civil officials.

In November 1917, the first government of the independent Transcaucasia was created in Tbilisi as the "Transcaucasian Commissariat (Sejm)" replaced "Transcaucasian Committee" following the Bolshevik seizure of power in Saint Petersburg. It was headed by a Georgian Menshevik Nikolay Chkheidze. On December 5, 1917, this new "Transcaucasian Committee" given the endorsement to Armistice of Erzincan that was signed with the Ottoman command of the Third Army. This was followed with what is known as the Trabzon peace negotiations. On February 10, 1918, the Sejm gathered and made the decision to establish independence. On February 24, 1918, Sejm proclaimed Transcaucasia independent under Transcaucasian Democratic Federative Republic. Headed by the Georgian Social Democrat Evgeni Gegechkori, Transcaucasian Commissariat was anti-Bolshevik in its political goals and sought the separation of Transcaucasia from Bolshevik Russia.

A project to change the boundaries of provinces and districts in the Transcaucasian region proposed to the Minister of Internal Affairs of the Provisional Government by a meeting held on 14-15 October 1917 under the Special Transcaucasian Committee (OZAKOM) on the implementation of zemstvo reform and the redistribution of administrative boundaries of provinces and districts of Transcaucasia, as well as by the decree of the Transcaucasian Commissariat of 16 December 1917 "On the introduction of zemstvo in Transcaucasia".

The committee ignored the Social Democratic hegemony in the region and provoked the Soviets to demand its abolition.

== Members ==
The Ozakom was composed of five members:

- Vasily Kharlamov, Chairman, Russian;
- Kita Abashidze, Social-Federalist, Georgian, subsequently replaced by Akaki Chkhenkeli (also Georgian);
- Mammad Yusif Jafarov, Azerbaijani.
- Michael Papadjanian, Armenian.

== See also ==
- Transcaucasian Democratic Federative Republic
- Administration for Western Armenia
