= Paata Mkheidze =

Georgian national-level politician

- პაატა მხეიძე
- Born: May 9, 1960 (age 65); Georgian SSR
- Education: Tbilisi State University

Paata Mkheidze (Georgian: პაატა მხეიძე, May 9, 1960, Georgian SSR) is a Georgian lawyer, state and political figure. Deputy of the Parliament of Georgia of the 6th convocation (from 2016 to 2020).

== Biography ==
He was born on May 9, 1960, in the Georgian SSR.

From 1981 to 1983 he did active military service in the Soviet Army. In 1986, he graduated from the Faculty of Law of the Tbilisi State University, specialty "Lawyer".

From 1977 to 1981, he worked as a mechanic at the Rustavi Repair-Mechanical Plant. After serving in the Army, from 1983 to 1984 he continued working as a locksmith at the Rustavi Repair-Mechanical Plant.

From 1984 to 1990 he worked as the head of the organization department of youth organizations, later as the second secretary, deputy chairman of the youth organization.

From 1990 to 2001 he worked in supervisory bodies of Georgia. He was Assistant Prosecutor for Environmental Protection of the Prosecutor's Office of Georgia, Assistant Prosecutor of Terjola City, Assistant Prosecutor of Tbilisi, Deputy Prosecutor for Supervision of Penitentiary Law Observance, Head of Division of the Prosecutor General's Office of Georgia.

From 2001 to 2004 he was Chairman of the Executive Department of the Prosecutor's Office of Georgia. He taught at Chavchavadze University.

From 2005 to 2011 he worked as an Investigator of the Investigation Unit of the Tax Service of the Ministry of Finance, later he was appointed as a Deputy Head of the Unit, Head of the Special Investigation and Financial Expertise Department.

From 2011 to 2014, he worked as a legal consultant for Fesweby KH LLC. From 2014 to 2015 he worked as the head of the monitoring department of Tbilisi City Hall. In 2015 he worked in the Ministry of Environmental Protection and Natural Resources of Georgia. From 2015 to 2016, he served as deputy head of the Investigation Department of the Ministry of Corrections and Probation of Georgia. Colonel, Senior Advisor of Justice.

From 2016 to 2020 he was a deputy of the Parliament of Georgia of the 6th convocation in the single-mandate constituency No. 29 from the electoral bloc "Georgian Dream - Democratic Georgia".
