= Kita Abashidze =

Georgian literary critic, journalist, and politician

Prince Kita (Ivane) Abashidze
- კიტა აბაშიძე
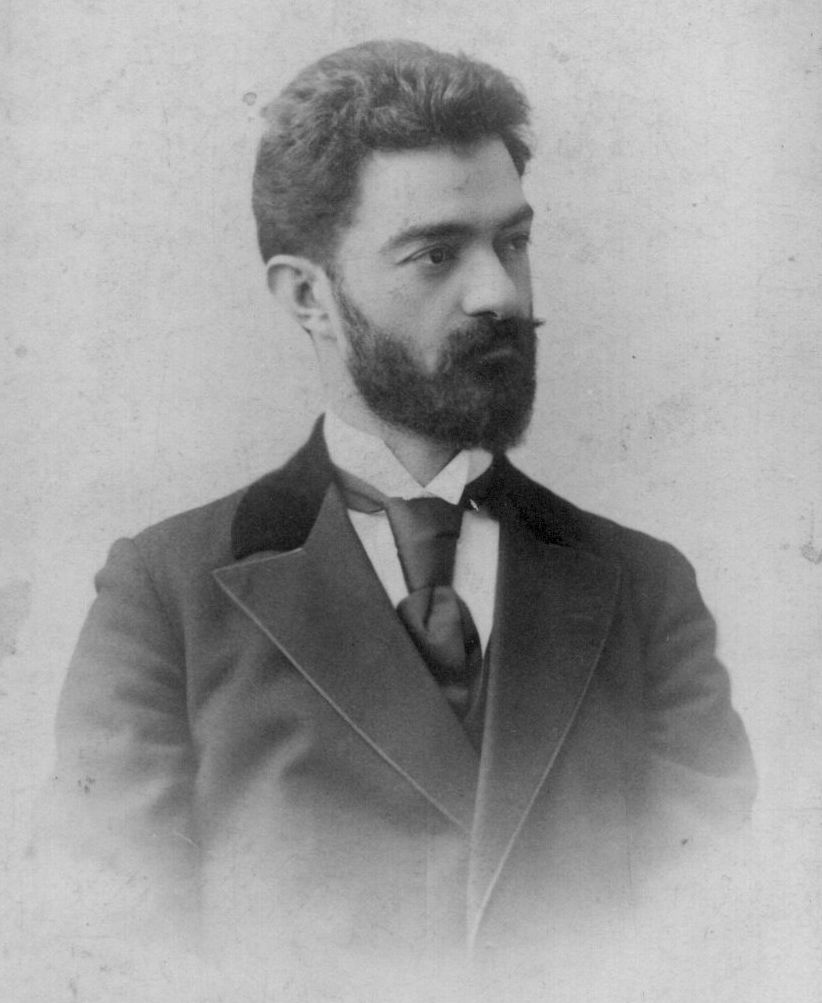
- Kita Abashidze in 1917
- Born: 16 January 1870
- Died: 17 December 1917 (aged 47); Tbilisi
- Education: Kutaisi Classic Gymnasium, Odesa University
- Occupations: Literary critic, journalist, politician

Prince Kita (Ivane) Abashidze (Georgian: კიტა აბაშიძე; 16 January 1870 – 17 December 1917) was a Georgian literary critic, journalist, and politician.

Abashidze was born into a noble family in the province of Guria. Having graduated from Kutaisi Classic Gymnasium (1889), he attended the lectures in philosophy and art theory in Paris and studied law at the Odessa University (1890–1895). Later in the 1890s, he worked for the Tiflis control chamber, and then as an arbitrator in Racha and Chiatura in western Georgia. From 1893 onward, he engaged in journalism and regularly wrote literary criticism for Georgian press. His aesthetics and views on the contemporary Georgian and world literature were shaped under the influence of the Georgian intellectuals of the 1860s and the French critic Ferdinand Brunetière.

In the early 1900s, Abashidze was involved in the management of Chiatura manganese industry, Georgy Zdanovich and later chaired the Manganese Industry Council. He also joined the Georgian Socialist-Federalist Revolutionary Party and became one of its leaders.

From 1895, Kita Abashidze worked in the Tbilisi Control Chamber, then as a conciliatory judge, first in the Racha district and then in Chiatura. From 1896, at the invitation of Ilia Chavchavadze, he became a contributor to "Iveria." From 1898, Kita Abashidze's creative ascent as a critic of 19th-century Georgian literature began. In this year, his "Etudes from Georgian Literature" were published serially in the pages of "Moambe," as well as a critical essay on the work of Ilia Chavchavadze, and later (1900) essays on the work of Vakhtang Orbeliani and Giorgi Eristavi. Kita Abashidze was also actively involved in the public sphere: he was a member of the board of the Society for the Dissemination of Literacy among Georgians, directly participated in the activities of the board of the Georgian Dramatic Society, was one of the founders of the "Union of Cultural Societies of Georgia," and chaired the Kutaisi society "Sinatle" (Light). In parallel, he collaborated with various journals and newspapers: "Tsnobis Purtseli," "Sakhalkho Gazeti," and "Droeba." In the family of Mariam Jambakur-Orbeliani, the daughter of Vakhtang Orbeliani, Kita met his future wife, Tekle Jambakur-Orbeliani, daughter of Nikoloz. They had four children. Ivane Javakhishvili also became a son-in-law of the same family (he married Tekle's younger sister, Anastasia), and from that day on, a heartfelt friendship began between Kita Abashidze and Ivane Javakhishvili.

From 1901, Kita Abashidze was the chairman of the "Mutual Trust Bank" of the Chiatura manganese industrialists' council, and then became the deputy chairman of the council, Georgy Zdanovich. During the days of the 1905 revolution, he actively participated in all anti-government demonstrations in Chiatura. He was even arrested for a while, and only thanks to influential relatives was he released from custody. In 1909, Kita Abashidze was arrested for the second time. The reason was his speech at the meeting of nobles held in Kutaisi on 22 February 1909, where the issue of the autocephaly of the Georgian Church was raised. Kita Abashidze, along with David Mikeladze and Nikoloz Tavdgiridze, demanded the independence of the church. At the direction of the Kutaisi governor, Kita was immediately arrested and then released again thanks to relatives. In 1911–1912, Kita Abashidze's famous work "Etudes on 19th-Century Georgian literature" was published in Kutaisi, which was the culmination of the work begun in 1898 in the pages of "Moambe". This is a valuable acquisition for Georgian literary criticism; it played a major role in the history of Georgian literary-critical thought and determined the entire subsequent development of the history of new Georgian literature as a science.

After the fall of the Imperial Russian government in the 1917 February Revolution, Abashidze was appointed a commissar for education within the Special Transcaucasian Committee ("Ozakom"), a provisional regional administration, being the only Georgian member of this body at its outset. He became bedridden with a diagnosis of spinal tuberculosis. Before his death, he wrote a will, bequeathing his rich library to the Society for the Dissemination of Literacy among Georgians and the University, which was still in the process of formation.

He died on 17 December 1917. He is buried in the Didube Pantheon of Writers and Public Figures. In March 1917, he was replaced in the Ozakom with the Social-Democrat Akaki Chkhenkeli. His wife, Tekle Jambakur-Orbeliani, daughter of Nikoloz (born 6 July 1876, Tbilisi – died 21 September 1961, ibid.), is also buried in the Didube Pantheon. His eldest son, Giorgi, was shot for participating in the 1924 uprising. There is a street named after him in Tbilisi.
