= Ilya Gruzinov =

Ilya Egorovich Gruzinov
- Born: 1781; Vilna Governorate, Russian Empire
- Died: January 1813 (aged 31–32); Baruny, Vilna Governorate, Russian Empire
- Education: Imperial Moscow University (1801), Saint Petersburg Academy of Physicians and Surgeons
- Known for: discovered that the actual source for a deep vocal sound is the membrane, which is a posterior wall of trachea and bronchi
- Scientific career
- Fields: anatomy, physiology
- Workplaces: Imperial Moscow University

Ilya Egorovich Gruzinov (Russian: Илья Егорович Грузинов; 1781 – January 1813) was an Imperial Russian professor of anatomy and physiology at Imperial Moscow University. He discovered in 1812 that the actual source for a deep and pleasant vocal sound is the membrane, which is a posterior wall of trachea and bronchi.

== Career ==
Gruzinov was born to a family of an ethnic Georgian priest of Russian orthodox Church. He received Christian education, then studied at Imperial Moscow University and Saint Petersburg Academy of Physicians and Surgeons followed by studies in Western Europe. He worked as adjunct professor of anatomy (from 1809) and professor of anatomy and physiology (from 1811) at the Medical Department of Moscow University. After Napoleon's invasion of Russia in 1812 he began to help wounded soldiers in the Russian Army.

Gruzinov made his discovery while dissecting dead bodies during and after the Battle of Borodino, and first described the audible properties of the membrane. Blowing air through, he found it to produce the sound, very similar to human voice. He described this best himself: "Anatomizing the dead bodies, by inflating the windpipe and stretching the membranous posterior wall of trachea, I have managed to produce a perfect vocal sound without engaging the vocal cords..." "Human voice is formed in the chest - in the bottom end of the windpipe (trachea), by means of the posterior membrane, attached to the cartilaginous cells..."

Gruzinov died from typhus in January 1813.
