= Dgebuadze (noble family) =

Coat of Arms of the Dgebuadze family

The House of Dgebuadze (Georgian: დგებუაძე) was a Georgian noble family from the province of Mingrelia.

== History ==
In the 19th century, they served to the Dadiani princes of Mingrelia as governors (mouravi) of the canton of Salipartiano, which was previously held by the cadet branches of the ruling House of Dadiani, as their appanage territory.

According to the historian Cyril Toumanoff, after the annexation of Georgia in the 19th century, they were incorporated into the Russian nobility and received the title of Knyaz of the Russian Empire in 1903 from Nicholas II.
