= Salipartiano =

Georgian polity

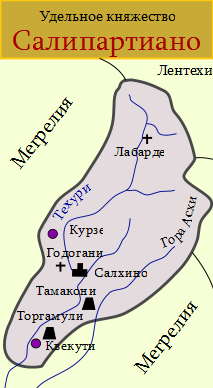
Map of Salipartiano

Salipartiano (Georgian: სალიპარტიანო) was a fief in the Principality of Mingrelia, in western Georgia, from the middle of the 16th century down to the establishment of the Russian hegemony in 1804, when it became a canton of Mingrelia. The fiefdom, its ruler titled as Lipartiani, was mostly in possession of the cadet branches of the House of Dadiani, the ruling princely dynasty of Mingrelia.

Salipartiano, literally, "of Lipartiani", was located in the northeastern portion of Mingrelia, or Odishi proper, covering most of what is now the Martvili Municipality, traversed by the Tekhuri River, on the border with Imereti. Both the title of Lipartiani and the name of the fiefdom appear to have been derived from Liparit, a name of one of the Mingrelian princes—probably, Liparit I (ruled 1414–1470)—from the Dadiani dynasty.

From at least the latter half of the 16th century, Salipartiano was reserved for the cadets, that is, younger sons, of the Princes of Mingrelia. Around 1662, the fiefdom was granted, in hereditary possession, to an old Georgian House of Chikovani of Lechkhumi, who went on to become, in the person of Katsia I, the ruling dynasty of Mingrelia as the second House of Dadiani in 1704. Thenceforth, Salipartiano became a princely domain, not infrequently bestowed by the rulers of Mingrelia upon members of their family to buy their loyalty or appease their dynastic ambitions. Thus, in 1799, Manuchar was appanaged with Salipartiano by his brother Grigol Dadiani, Prince of Mingrelia, as part of a peace deal. On Grigol's death in 1804, Manuchar lost his appanage. He solicited the Russian governor of Georgia, Prince Tsitsianov, to help recover the lost possessions, but his request was rejected. Salipartiano became an estate of the Prince of Mingrelia and given in governorship (mouravi) to the Georgian noble family of Dgebuadze.
