= House of Chikovani =

House of Chicovani ჩიქოვანი
Coat of Arms
Capitals	Zurgdid, Principality of Mingrelia
Preceding states	Kingdom of Georgia
Succeeding state	Russian Empire

The House of Chikovani (Georgian: ჩიქოვანი; sometimes spelled as Chicovani) is a line of Georgian nobility, once a princely house in monarchical Georgia. Originally, the Dukes of Chikovani ruled the province of Lechkhumi in northwestern Georgia. At the end of the 17th century, General Katso Chikovani rose to prominence in the adjacent Principality of Mingrelia, which allowed him to enthrone his son, who assumed the dynastic name of Dadiani. From that point on, Chikovani ruled Mingrelia under the dynastic name of Dadiani until the principality was abolished in the late 19th century. The cadet branch of the family continued to exist under the name of Chikovani.

Following the annexation of Georgia into the Russian Empire, Chikovani were incorporated into the imperial Russian nobility alongside other Georgian noble families.

== History ==
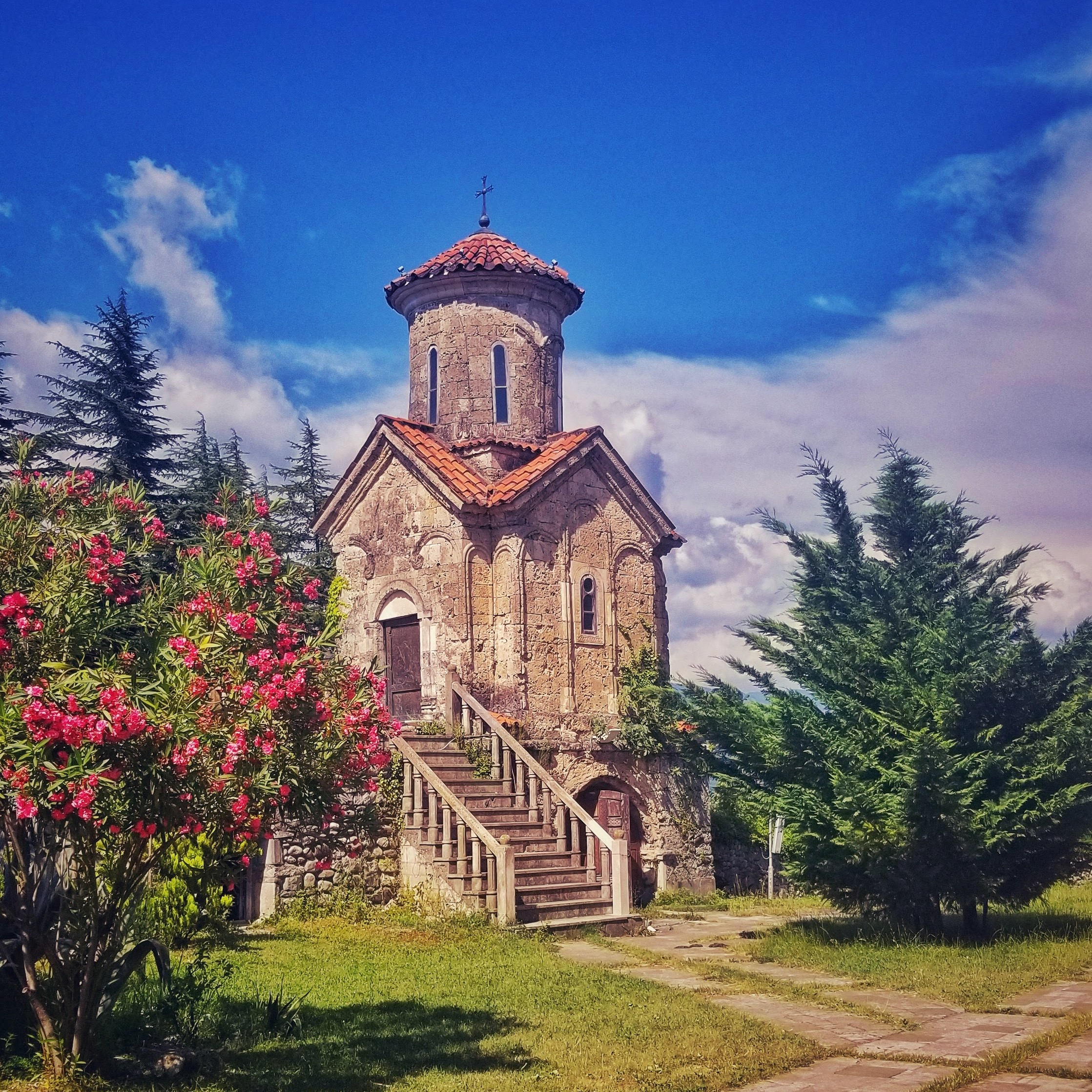
Chikovani Chapel, a medieval religious structure tracing its roots to the eponymous princely family. Part of Martvili Monastery.

The House of Chikovani first came to prominence after General Katzo Chikovani (d. 1682), Prince of Salipartiano, was promoted to the post of the Chief Minister at the court of Levan III, Prince of Mingrelia.

As he strengthened his position among the nobles of western Georgia, General Chikovani eliminated members of many prominent houses, including those of the ruling Dadiani House. When Levan III died in 1681 without leaving a male heir, his natural son Levan IV was forced to abdicate, and General Chikovani's son took over the leadership of the Principality of Mingrelia. General Chikovani's increased power facilitated the ascent of his son George to the Mingrelian Throne. George became a ruler of the principality and after adopting the title of Dadiani became known as George IV Dadiani of Mingrelia.

Beginning with George IV until Nikolas Dadiani, Prince of Mingrelia, all members of the ruling Dadiani family were by blood members of the House of Chikovani. The lineage lasted until the principality was abolished in late 1800s by the Russian Empire which took advantage of internal instability, Ottoman Invasions during the Crimean War, and a subsequent request for help from Ekaterine Dadiani, the Last Princess of Mingrelia.

The Chikovani branch that remained without the ruling title of Dadiani traces its origins to General Chikovani's second son Jesse who did not assume the dynastic title in Mingrelia.

== Notable descendants ==
- Simon Chikovani – futurist poet and political figure.
- Giorgi Kvinitadze – military commander who rose from an officer in the Imperial Russian army to commander-in-chief of the Democratic Republic of Georgia. Descended through his father, Colonel Ivane Chikovani.
- Irakli Chikovani – Vice Prime Minister of Georgia.
- Vakhtang Vladimiris dze Chikovani ru – Hero of the Soviet Union
- Archil Chikovani – Mayor of Batumi.

=== Historical gallery ===
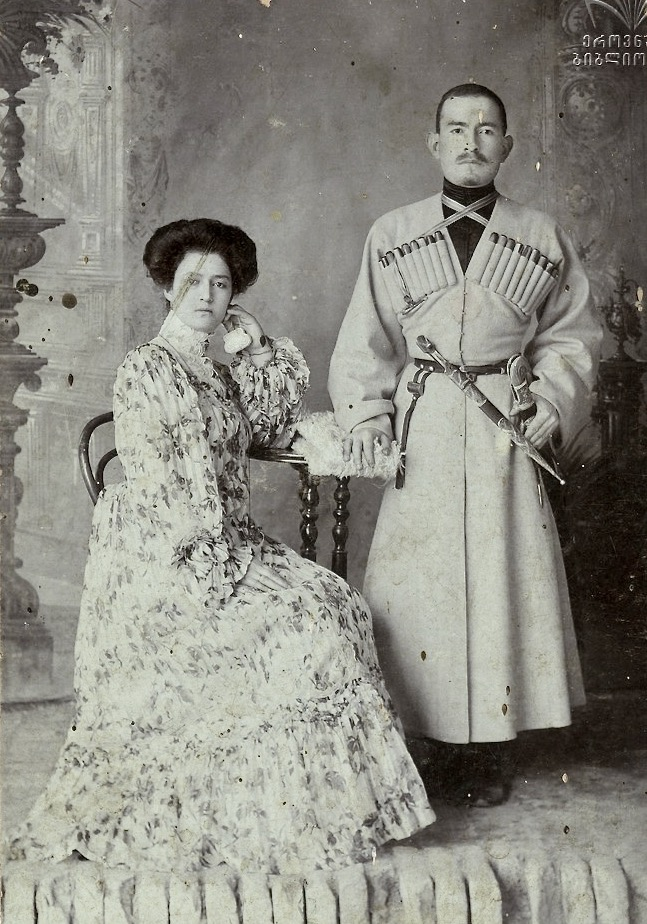
Elizabeth Chikovani and her husband, associates of Ilia Chavchavadze and promoters of Georgian literacy.

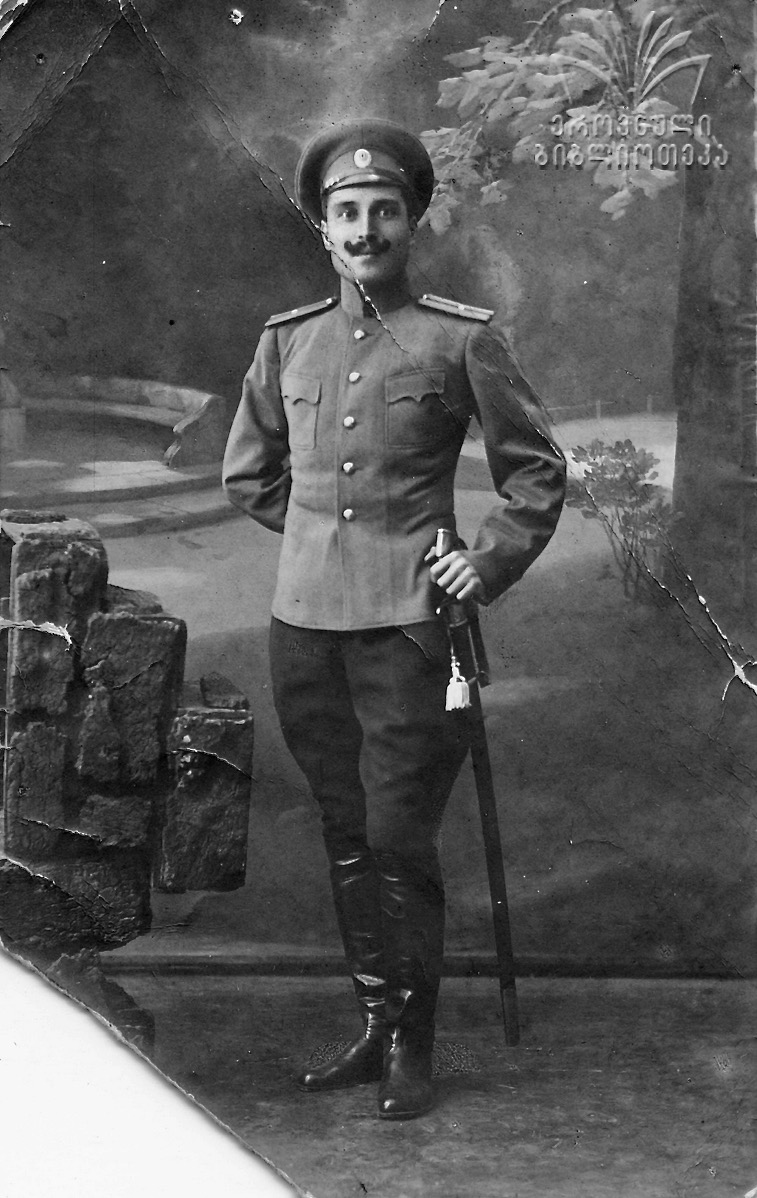
Nobleman Alexandre "Sandro" Chikovani in Russian Imperial uniform

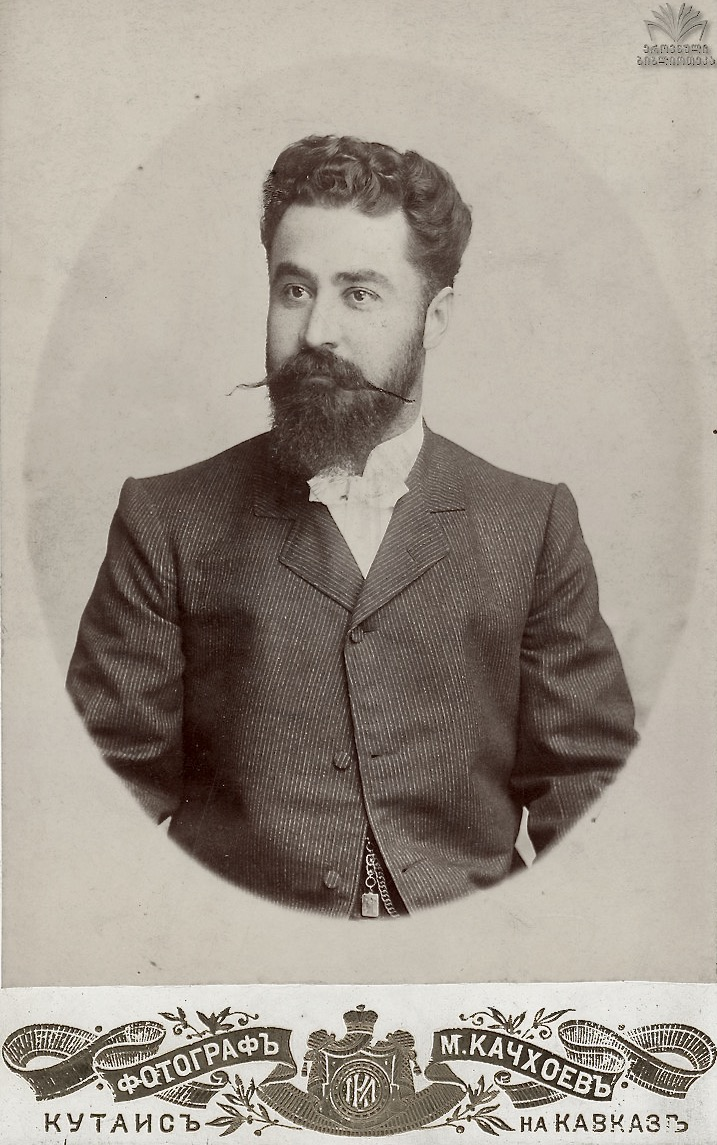
Ilya Chikovani, writer and later Mayor of Kutaisi.

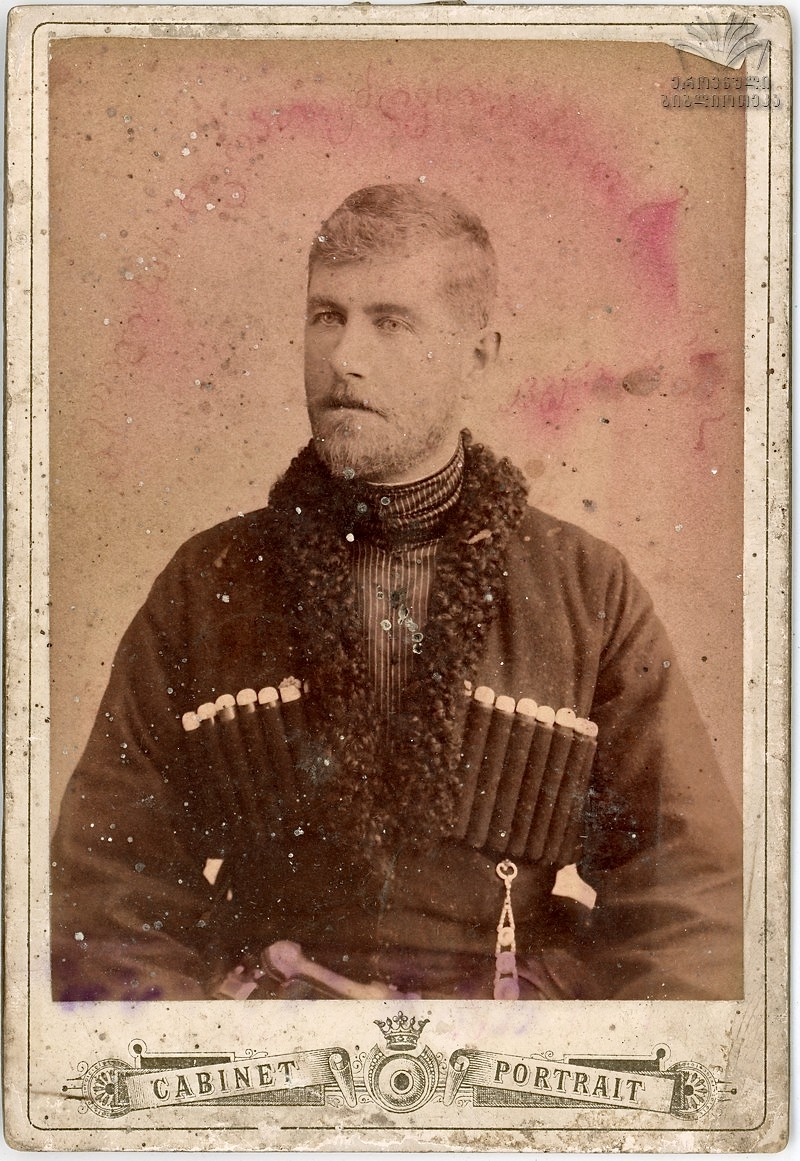
Nobleman Eugene Chikovani in traditional attire.

== Related ==
- House of Dadiani
- Principality of Mingrelia
- Salipartiano
