= Chijavadze =

Georgian noble family

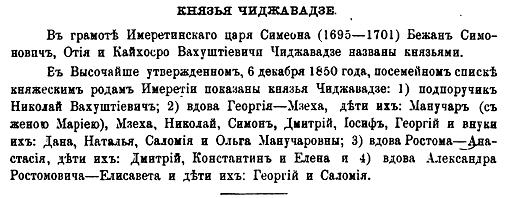
Register of Princes Chijavadze in the Russian book of nobility from 1892

The House of Chijavadze (Georgian: ჩიჯავაძე) or Chizhavadze (ჩიჟავაძე) were a Georgian noble family (tavadi), prominent in the western Kingdom of Imereti in the 16th and 17th centuries.

== History ==
The Chijavadze of Imereti share origin with the Chichua, a noble family in neighboring Mingrelia. Their ancestors had settled in Kartli in the 10th century and then in Imereti in the mid-15th. The 20th-century historian Cyril Toumanoff considered them an offshoot of the medieval Kakhaberidze family of the Liparitid stock, while Simon Janashia and, following him, several other Georgian authorities, viewed them as the continuation of the noble clan (aznauri) Sadzvereli (საზვერელი) known from the medieval Georgian chronicles to have helped George II of Abkhazia to seize his rebellious son, Constantine, in the 920s. Janashia corroborated his conclusion by the fact that “Sadzvereli”, probably originally a territorial epithet, later appeared as a male given name in the Chijavadze family on several occasions. The surname Chijavadze itself is first recorded in the 15th-century documents.

The princely fief of Chijavadze had formed by the early 16th century. It occupied most of the territory known as Sachino in what is now the Vani Municipality, with a principal castle at Sebeka. The family had a surge in prominence in the mid-17th century and then gradually went into decline, eventually losing most of their estates to Prince Mamuka of Imereti in the 1730s. Later in the 18th century, Prince Vakhushti Chijavadze was able to recover the family's standing and holdings thanks to his close ties with King Solomon II of Imereti. After the Russian conquest of Imereti in 1810, the Chijavadze were incorporated into the Imperial Russian nobility and confirmed in their princely dignity (knyaz) in 1850.
