= Alexander IV of Imereti =

Alexander IV
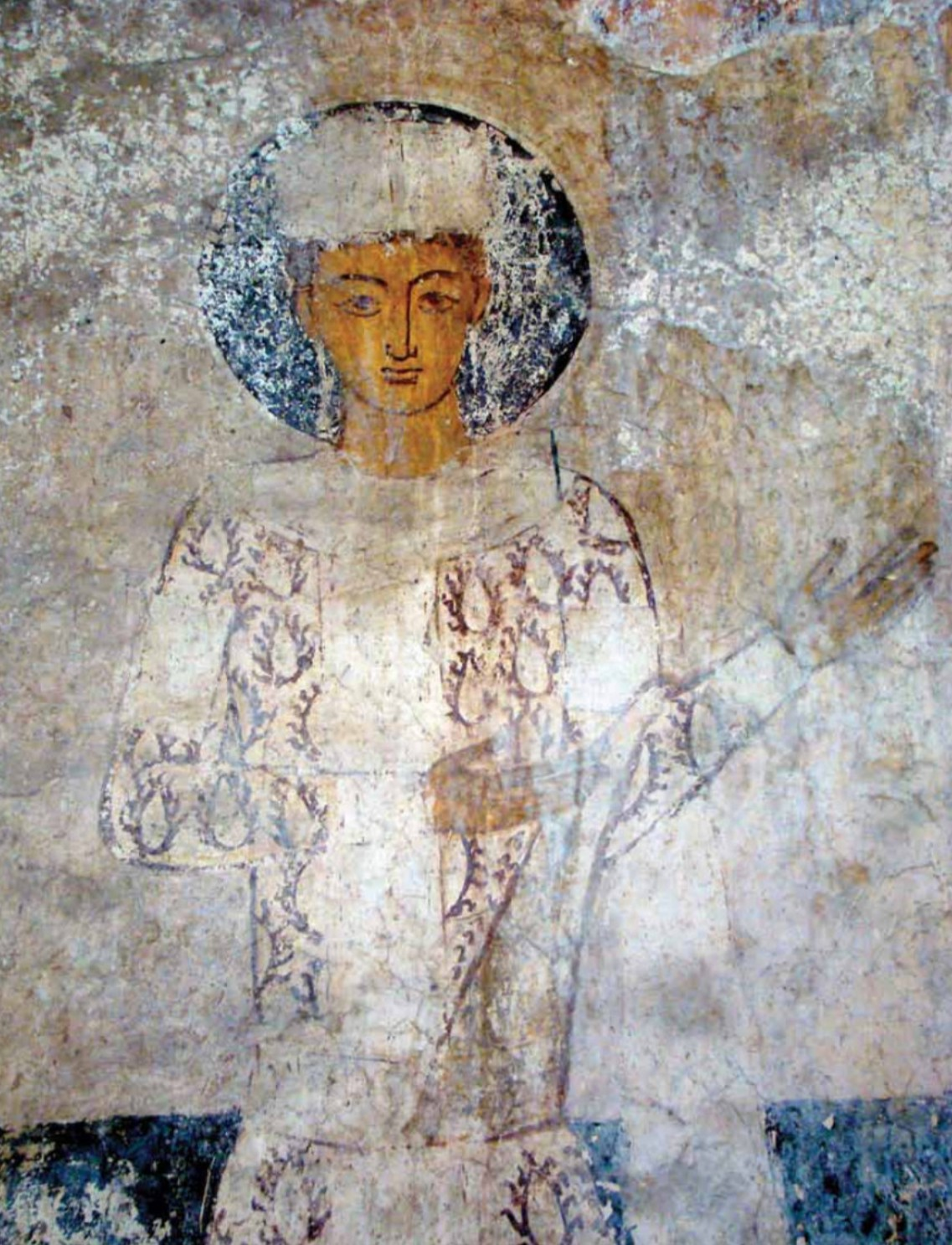
- Fresco possibly depicting Alexander IV at Gelati Monastery.

King of Imereti
- 1st reign: 1683–1690
- Predecessor: George III Gurieli
- Successor: Archil II
- 2nd reign: 1691–1695
- Predecessor: Archil II
- Successor: Archil II
- Died: 1695; Ruisi
- Burial: Ruisi cathedral
- Spouse: Tamar Abashidze (m. 1691)
- Issue Among others: Simon of Imereti (ill.); George VI of Imereti (ill.)
- Dynasty: Bagrationi
- Father: Bagrat IV of Imereti
- Religion: Georgian Orthodox Church (Catholicate of Abkhazia)

Alexander IV (Georgian: ალექსანდრე IV, romanized: aleksandre IV; died 1695), of the Bagrationi dynasty, was a king (mepe) of Imereti (western Georgia) from 1683 to 1690 and again from 1691 to 1695.

== Reign ==
A natural son of Bagrat IV of Imereti, he was a political hostage at the eastern Georgian court of George XI of Kartli at the death of his father in 1681. George III Gurieli, Prince of Guria, capitalized on the vacuum of power in Imereti, and seized the crown the same year. However, George XI and the Imeretian nobles secured the Ottoman recognition for Alexander, who was enthroned in Imereti after deposing Prince Gurieli in 1683.

Alexander married off his sister Darejan to his powerful vassal Paata Abashidze, lord of Upper Imereti, and succeeding in crushing the aristocratic opposition led by Prince Gurieli in 1684. In order to get rid of the Ottoman hegemony, Alexander transferred his loyalty to the Safavid shah Suleiman I of Persia in 1689, but was expelled by the Turks into Kartli in August 1690.

In 1691, through the mediation of Heraclius I of Kartli and the Persian government, Alexander was restored in Imereti after a year of anarchy and misrule, only to be dethroned by the nobles led by his own father-in-law Prince Giorgi-Malakia Abashidze. The leaders of the coup delivered Alexander to the anti-Persian king of Kartli, George XI, who had him executed and buried at the Ruisi Cathedral in 1695.

== Family ==
Alexander IV cohabited with the daughter of a didebuli before sending her away in 1691 to marry Tamar (1681–1707/1709), daughter of Prince George Abashidze. His children were:

- Simon of Imereti (died 1701), born to the daughter of a didebuli; King of Imereti (r. 1698–1701).
- George VI of Imereti (died 1720), born to the daughter of a didebuli; King of Imereti (r. 1703–1720, with interruptions).
- An unnamed daughter (fl. 1715–1720), who married Prince Bezhan Tsereteli (fl. 1661–1680).
- An unnamed daughter (fl. 1709), born to Tamar, who married Shoshita III, Duke of Racha. He divorced her in 1709 and subsequently married Princess Mariam, sister of Alexander IV.

== Bibliography ==
- Brosset, Marie-Félicité (1856). Histoire de la Georgie depuis l'antiquite jusqu'au 19. siecle (in French). Vol. 5. l'acad. Imper. des sciences.

Preceded by George IV	King of Imereti; 1683–90	Succeeded by Archil II
Preceded by Archil II	King of Imereti; 1691–95	Succeeded by Archil II
