= George V of Imereti =

Georgian nobleman (died 1722)

King of Imereti
- Reign: 1702–1707
- Predecessor: Mamia III Gurieli
- Successor: George VI
- Died: 15 October 1722
- Issue Among othere: Phinez; Levan; Elene; Tamar; Ana
- House: Abashidze
- Father: Paata Abashidze
- Religion: Georgian Orthodox Church (Catholicate of Abkhazia)

Giorgi-Malakia Abashidze (Georgian: გიორგი-მალაქია აბაშიძე, died 15 October 1722) was a Georgian nobleman and King of Imereti as George V from 1702 to 1707. He was a member of the prominent House of Abashidze.

== Biography ==
The youngest son of Prince Paata Abashidze, he served as a priest until about 1684 when he entered politics after the death of his elder brother Paata Abashidze and began aggressively expanding his patrimonial fiefdom. He dispossessed the House of Chkheidze of Shorapani, and the House of Agiashvili of Tsutskhvati, and took control of the royal domain in Upper Imereti. Princess Tamar Abashidze, his daughter by his marriage to Princess Tamar Chijavadze, was married to the two successive kings of Imereti, Alexander IV and George IV. During the reign of the latter monarch, Abashidze effectively ran the government and acted as an all-powerful kingmaker. In 1699, he gave his daughter Anika in marriage to King Simon of Imereti, but they divorced in 1700. In 1701, Abashidze compelled King Mamia of Imereti to abdicate and seized the throne for himself. He managed to establish a degree of stability in Imereti and ceased to pay tribute to the Ottoman Empire, triggering a military response in 1703. He also patronized culture and learning. Deposed after a revolt by the nobles, in favour of the rightful Bagrationi king George VI, Abashidze took refuge at the court of Vakhtang VI in Tbilisi. He died there in 1722, and was buried in the Katskhi Monastery in Imereti.

== Family ==
George had five sons and five daughters:

- Phinez, whose descendants were known by the surnames Abashidze-Phinezishvili, Phinezishvili-Abashidze, and Phinezishvili;
- Paata;
- Levan (died 1757), whose daughter Tamar was married to Alexander V of Imereti. He was killed in the Battle of Khresili while fighting against his maternal grandson, King Solomon I;
- Bezhan;
- Malakia;
- Elene, who married Mamia III Gurieli, Prince of Guria;
- Tamar (1681–1707/1709), who was married to Alexander IV of Imereti, George IV of Imereti, and George IV Dadiani;
- Ana (Anika), who was married to Simon of Imereti and later married Lomkatsi Chijavadze;
- Mariam, who married Prince Vakhushti of Kartli around 1717;
- An unnamed daughter, who was married first to Giorgi Nizharadze and secondly to Merab Tsulukidze.

== Bibliography ==
- (in Russian) Вахушти Багратиони (Vakhushti Bagrationi) (1745). История Царства Грузинского: Жизнь Имерети.
- David Marshall Lang, The Last Years of the Georgian Monarchy, 1658-1832. New York: Columbia University Press, 1957.
- Brosset, Marie-Félicité (1856). Histoire de la Georgie depuis l'antiquite jusqu'au 19. siecle (in French). Vol. 5. l'acad. Imper. des sciences.
- Toumanoff, Cyril (1976). Manuel de Généalogie et de Chronologie pour l'histoire de la Caucasie chrétienne (Arménie, Géorgie, Albanie) [Manual of Genealogy and Chronology of Christian Caucasian History (Armenia, Georgia, Albania)] (in French). Rome: Edizioni Aquila.
- Soselia, Olgha (1973). ნარკვევები ფეოდალური ხანის დასავლეთ საქართველოს სოციალურ-პოლიტიკური ისტორიიდან : სათავადოები : წიგნი I (in Georgian). Tbilisi: Metsniereba.

Preceded by Mamia	King of Imereti; 1702–1707	Succeeded by George VI
