= House of Abashidze =

Georgian princely family

Coat of arms of Abashidze family

Coat of arms of Abashidze-Gorlenko family

The House of Abashidze (Georgian: აბაშიძე) is a Georgian noble family and a former Georgian princely house. Appearing in the 15th century, they achieved prominence in the Kingdom of Imereti in western Georgia in the 17th century and branched out in the eastern Georgian kingdoms of Kakheti and Kartli as well as the then-Ottoman-held southwestern region of Adjara. After the Russian annexation of Georgian polities, the family was confirmed as Knyaz Abashidze (Russian: Абашидзе) by the Tsar’s decree of 1825.

== History ==
According to family legend, the Abashidze family descended from an Abyssinian officer named Abash, who allegedly accompanied Marwan ibn Muhammad’s Arab army during its campaign in Georgia in the 8th century. However, historical evidence suggests that this is a much later fabricated legend, as the Abashidze family is first mentioned in historical sources several centuries after the alleged events, and no evidence supports the claimed connection.

The first recorded account about the Abashidze dates back to the latter part of the 15th century. By the 1540s, they had already been in possession of a sizeable fiefdom within the Kingdom of Imereti located in its eastern part and called Saabashidzeo (სააბაშიძეო; literally, "[the land] of Abashidze"). The family reached a climax of its might at the turn of the 18th century, when it possessed 78 villages, several castles, fortresses, churches and monasteries as well as 1,500 serf households. Prince Giorgi-Malakia Abashidze was not only the most powerful vassal of the crown of Imereti, but himself acted as a kingmaker and even de facto king from 1702 to 1707. The family branched out in eastern Georgia when Erekle II, King of Kartli and Kakheti, granted, in 1774, to his father-in-law Prince Zaal Abashidze and his male descendants estates in Kakheti. A branch had also been established in Kartli in the person of Vakhushti Abashidze. Earlier in the 18th century, one representative of the Imeretian line went over to the Ottoman government and settled at Batumi where his descendants attained to the office of sanjak-bey.

The Russian annexation of Imereti in 1810 brought the princedom of Saabashidzeo to an end. Henceforth, the family was equated to other noble families of the Russian Empire and confirmed as princes on September 20, 1825. On July 29, 1876, Prince Simon Abashidze (1837–1891) was granted the right to assume the surname and coat of arms of his father-in-law, the late Ukrainian nobleman Semen Davydovych Gorlenko, for himself and his male-line descendants (Abashidze-Gorlenko, Абашидзе-Горленко), but he died without a male heir.

The family has survived into the 21st century and has produced several notable writers, public figures and politicians.

== See also ==
- List of Georgian princely families

== Bibliography ==
- Холюшкин, Юрий Павлович. "Абашидзе". Титулованные роды Российской империи (in Russian).
