= Darkveti church =

Church in Georgia

Darkveti church of Saint George
- დარკვეთის წმინდა გიორგის ეკლესია
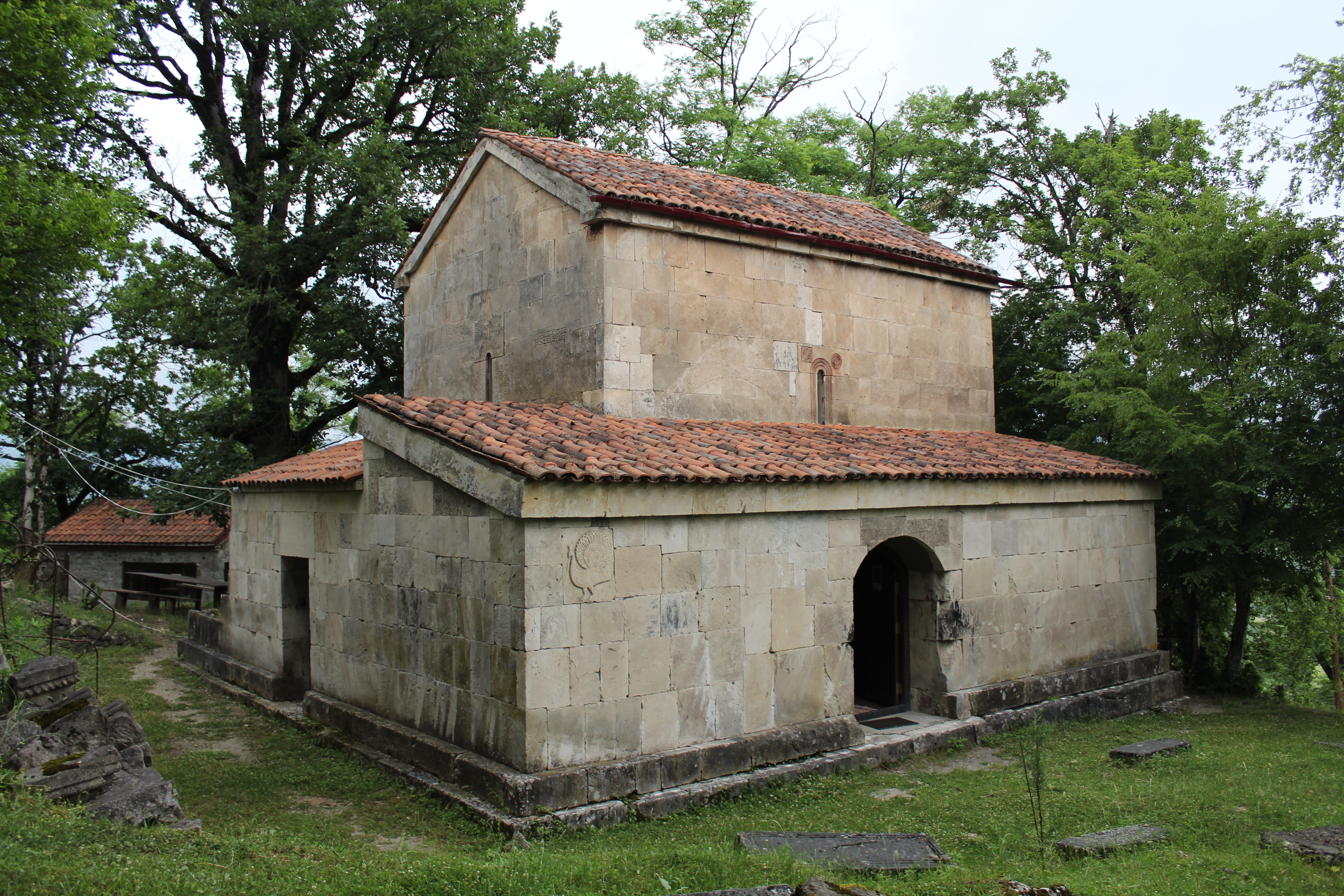
- Darkveti church of Saint George
- Interactive map of Darkveti church of Saint George
- Location: Darkveti, Chiatura Municipality; Imereti, Georgia
- Coordinates: 42.325127°N 43.335300°E
- Type: Single-nave basilica

The Darkveti church of Saint George (Georgian: დარკვეთის წმინდა გიორგის ეკლესია, romanized: dark'vetis ts'minda giorgis ek'lesia) is a 10th–11th-century Georgian Orthodox church in the western Georgian region of Imereti. A single-nave basilica with an ambulatory, the church has harmonious proportions and carved masonry ornamentation on the exterior façades. The church is inscribed on the list of Georgia's Immovable Cultural Monuments of National Significance.

The Darkveti church stands on the right bank of the Jruchula, a tributary of the Qvirila River, in the eponymous village, in the Chiatura Municipality, Imereti region. The village itself sits on a mountain, above the Mghvimevi monastery, and its also known for its prehistoric grotto.

The Darkveti church, dedicated to Saint George, is a single-aisled basilica, with a low ambulatory—annexed at a later date—which runs along the south and west sides; on these sides there are, also, the entrances to the church. The interior is divided up by two pairs of pilasters which support internal arches of the vault. The interior is whitewashed and there is no trace of painting. The church is lit with four windows, one on each side. The façades bear carved ornamentations, especially the window and door frames, resembling those of the Savane church of St. George, some 15 km east of Darkveti. On the south wall, there is a slab with a relief representation of a peacock. The western facade of the church has one semi-circular window, with carved archivolt, and also bears a number of medieval Georgian inscriptions. Paleographically they represent the rare angular, and sometimes the even rarer square-shaped letters.

The inscriptions credit the certain Goliath and his sons—Godalbri, Liparit, and K–E (Konstantine?). From an inscription in Savane, Goliath is known to have been a son of Giorgi, son of Gulzviad, an eristavt-eristavi ("duke of dukes") and the builder of that church. It is not known to which noble family these persons belonged: Dimitri Bakradze and G. Tsereteli saw in them members of the Kakhaberidze dynasty, while Ekvtime Taqaishvili hypothesized they represented the pre-Kakhaberidze dukes of Argveti.
