= Katskhi Pillar =

Natural limestone monolith in Georgia

Katskhi Pillar კაცხის სვეტი
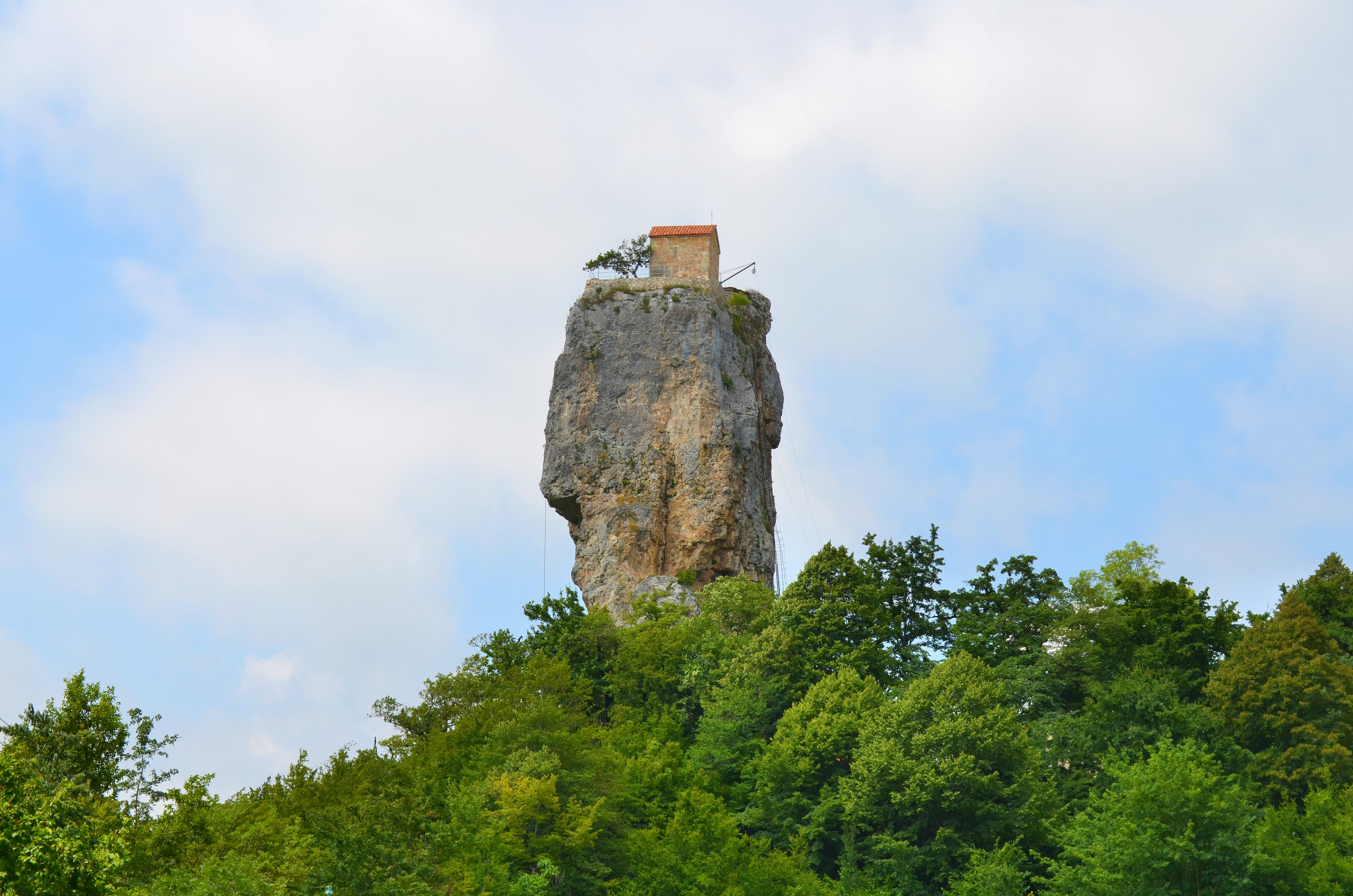
- Katskhi Pillar

- Location within Georgia

Religion
- Affiliation: Georgian Orthodox Church
- District: Argveti District (historic); Chiatura District (present)
- Region: Caucasus
- Leadership: The monk Maxim
- Status: Abandoned (partially active since 1995), restored and rebuilt

Location
- Location: Katskhi, 5 km from the town of Chiatura, Chiatura District, Imereti Province (Mkhare), Georgia
- Coordinates: 42.2875°N 43.2156°E

Architecture
- Type: Small church atop a stone pillar
- Style: Georgian; Hermitage and Monastery
- Completed: 9th or 10th century

The Katskhi Pillar (Georgian: კაცხის სვეტი, kac'xis svet'i) is a natural limestone monolith located at the village of Katskhi in western Georgian region of Imereti, near the town of Chiatura. It is approximately 40 metres (130 ft) high, and overlooks the small river valley of Katskhura, a right affluent of the Q'virila.

The rock, with visible church ruins on a top surface measuring c. 150 m^{2} (1,600 sq ft), has been venerated by locals as the Pillar of Life and a symbol of the True Cross, and has become surrounded by legends. It remained unclimbed by researchers and unsurveyed until 1944 and was more systematically studied from 1999 to 2009. These studies determined the ruins were of an early medieval hermitage dating from the 9th or 10th century. A Georgian inscription paleographically dated to the 13th century suggests that the hermitage was still extant at that time. Religious activity associated with the pillar was revived in the 1990s and the monastery building had been restored within the framework of a state-funded program by 2009.

== Architecture ==
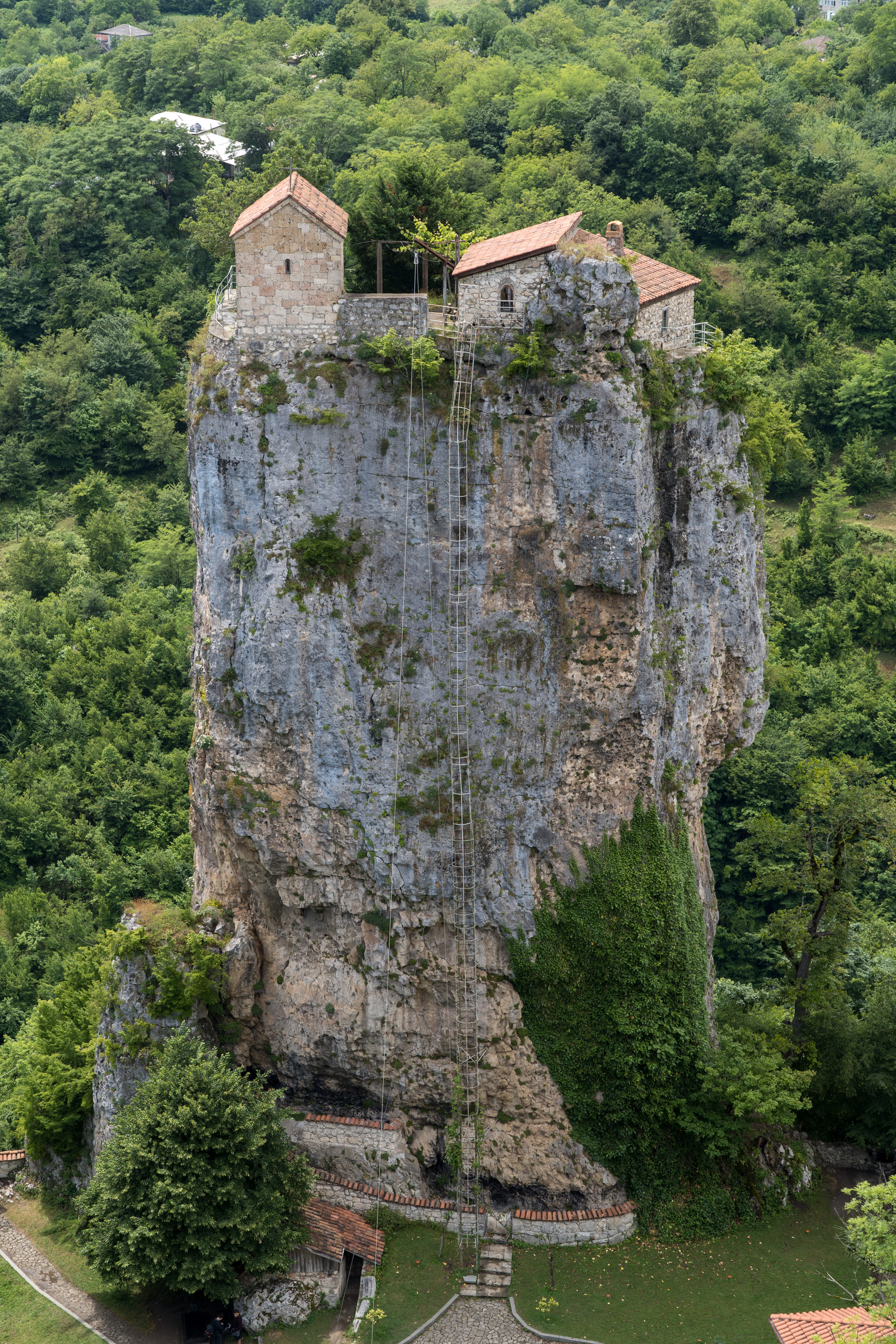
Katskhi Pillar with monastery, Imereti region, Georgia (June 2025)

The Katskhi Pillar complex currently consists of a church dedicated to Maximus the Confessor, a crypt (burial vault), three hermit cells, a wine cellar, and a curtain wall on the uneven top surface of the column. At the base of the pillar are the newly built church of Simeon Stylites and ruins of an old wall and belfry.

The church of St. Maximus the Confessor is located at the south-easternmost corner of the top surface of the Katskhi Pillar. A small simple hall church design with the dimensions of 4.5 by 3.5 metres (15 ft × 11 ft), it is a modern restoration of the ruined medieval church built of stone. Beneath and south of the church is an elongated rectangular crypt with the dimensions of 2.0 by 1.0 metre (6 ft 7 in × 3 ft 3 in), which had served as a burial vault. Digs at the ruined wine cellar revealed eight large vessels known in Georgia as k'vevri. Also of note is a rectangular cellar grotto with the entrance and two skylights—on the vertical surface of the rock, some 10 metres (33 ft) below the top. At the very base of the pillar is a cross in relief, exhibiting parallels with similar early medieval depictions found elsewhere in Georgia, particularly at Bolnisi.

== History ==
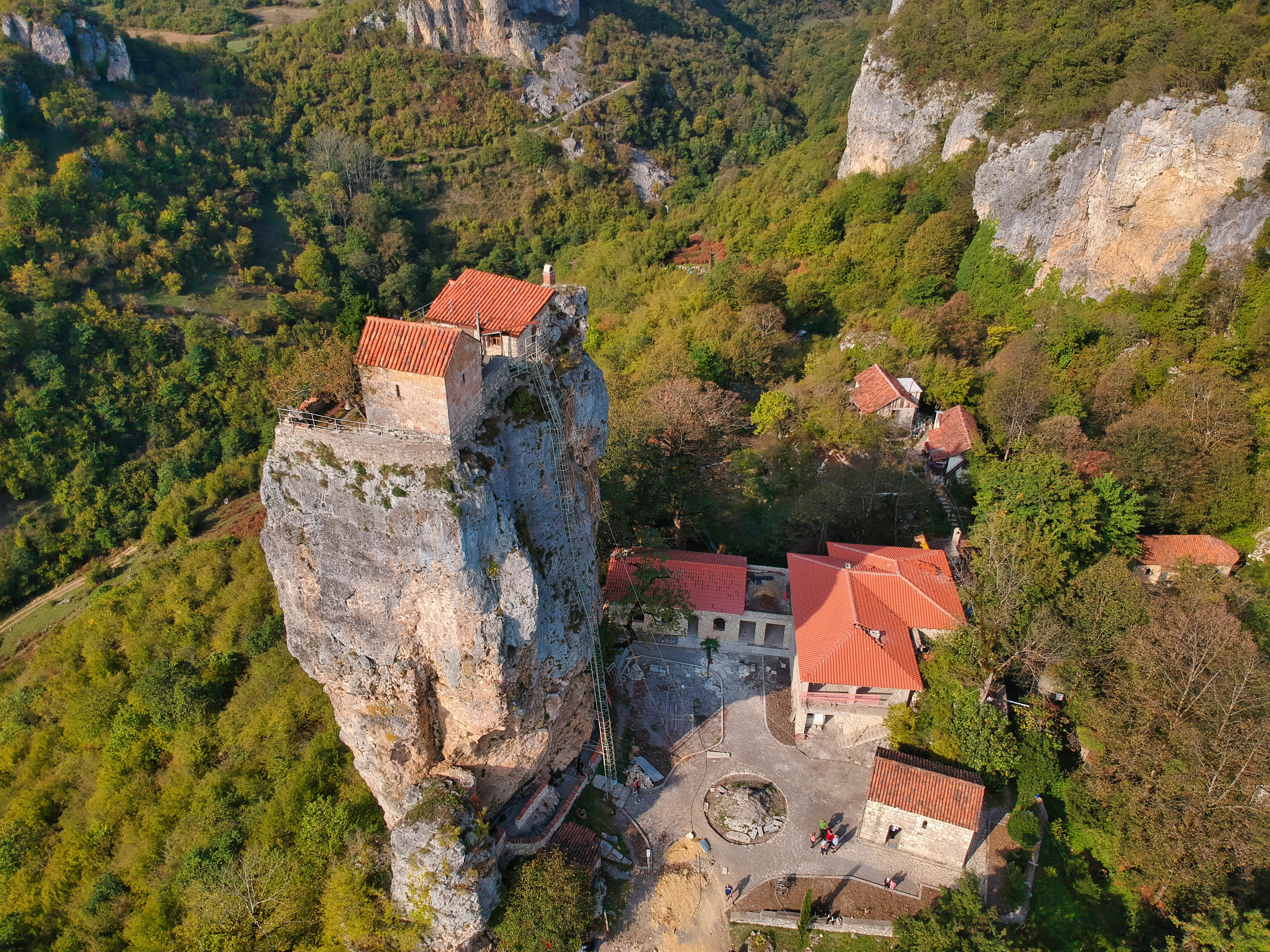
The Katskhi Pillar (October 2019)

In historical records, the Katskhi Pillar is first mentioned by the 18th-century Georgian scholar Prince Vakhushti, who reports in his Geographic Description of the Kingdom of Georgia: "There is a rock within the ravine standing like a pillar, considerably high. There is a small church on the top of the rock, but nobody is able to ascend it; nor know they how to do that." No other written accounts of monastic life or ascents survive. A number of local legends surround the pillar. One of them has it that the top of the rock was connected by a long iron chain to the dome of the Katskhi church, located at a distance of around 1.5 kilometres (0.93 mi) from the pillar.

In July 1944, a group led by the mountaineer Alexander Japaridze and the writer Levan Gotua made the first documented ascent of the Katskhi Pillar. Vakhtang Tsintsadze, an architecture specialist with the group, reported in his 1946 paper that the ruins found on top of the rock were remains of two churches, dating from the 5th and 6th centuries and associated with a stylite practice, a form of Christian asceticism. Since 1999, the Katskhi Pillar has become the subject of more systematic research. Based on further studies and archaeological digs conducted in 2006, Giorgi Gagoshidze, an art historian with the Georgian National Museum, re-dated the structures to the 9th–10th century. He concluded that this complex was composed of a monastery church and cells for hermits. Discovery of the remnants of a wine cellar also undermined the idea of extreme ascetism flourishing on the pillar. In 2007, a small limestone plate with the asomtavruli Georgian inscriptions was found, paleographically dated to the 13th century and revealing the name of a certain "Giorgi", responsible for the construction of three hermit cells. The inscription also makes mention of the Pillar of Life, echoing the popular tradition of veneration of the rock as a symbol of the True Cross.

Religious activity started to revive in 1995, with the arrival of the monk Maxim Kavtaradze, a native of Chiatura. Between 2005 and 2009, the monastery building on the top of the pillar was restored with the support of the National Agency for Cultural Heritage Preservation of Georgia. The rock was once accessible to male visitors through an iron ladder running from its base to the top, but since 2012, for safety reasons, visitors are no longer allowed to climb it.

Kavtaradze, a monk of the Orthodox Church, lived on top of the Katskhi Pillar for 20 years, coming down only twice a week. Evidence of use by stylites as late as the 13th century has been found on the top of the rock. With the aid of local villagers and the National Agency for Cultural Heritage Preservation of Georgia, Qavtaradze restored the 1200-year-old monastic chapel on the top of the rock. A film documentary on the project was completed in 2013.
