= Archbishop of Chiatura =

Chiatura is a city in the country of Georgia. It is the seat of an archbishop of the Georgian Orthodox and Apostolic Church.

== List of Orthodox archbishops of Chiatura ==
- 21st century: Abraham (Abraam)
- 2010-Present (as of 2014) (Acting): Metropolitan Daniel (Georgian: დანიელი, Datuashvili)
