= Georgian Manganese LLC =

- Industry: Manganese mining & Ferroalloys
- Headquarters: Georgia
- Website: gm.ge

The Georgian Manganese LLC (GM) is a mining company responsible for the extraction of manganese and production of ferroalloys. Georgian Manganese was the Georgian subsidiary of the British company Stemcor, but, at the end of 2006, Stemcor sold 75% of Holding’s shares to Ukrainian Privat Group. This group owned Tao-Privat bank in Georgia from 2007 to 2014. In 2013, the Privat Group transferred Georgian Manganese and Vartsikhe Hydro Power Cascade owned by Georgian Manganese to an American holding “Georgia American Alloys”. The Georgian Manganese LLC owns Zestaponi Ferroalloy Plant in Zestaponi (through JSC Ferro) and Chiatura mine in Chiatura (through JSC Manganumi).

Until 2009, the company functioned without the environmental impact assessment and appropriate permit. Permit conditions were first inspected in 2012 and the company was fined 5000 Georgian lari for violation of permit conditions. In September 2014, after unsuccessful attempts to fine the company, the Georgian Ministry imposed limits and restrictions on the company. In May 2017, a special manager was appointed by the Tbilisi City Court in order to ensure compliance with license and permit conditions. Since 2019, the company has faced sporadic public protests from local residents of Shukruti village where its mining site is located, over the destruction of property of local residents as a result of Georgian Manganese LLC activities and alleged non-payment of compensation.

Ukrainian-born Israeli billionaire businessman, Ihor Kolomoyskyi, is a majority shareholder of Georgian Manganese LLC.

== See also ==
- Mining in Georgia (country)
