= Savane church =

Georgian Orthodox church in Georgia

Savane church of Saint George
- სავანის წმინდა გიორგის ეკლესია
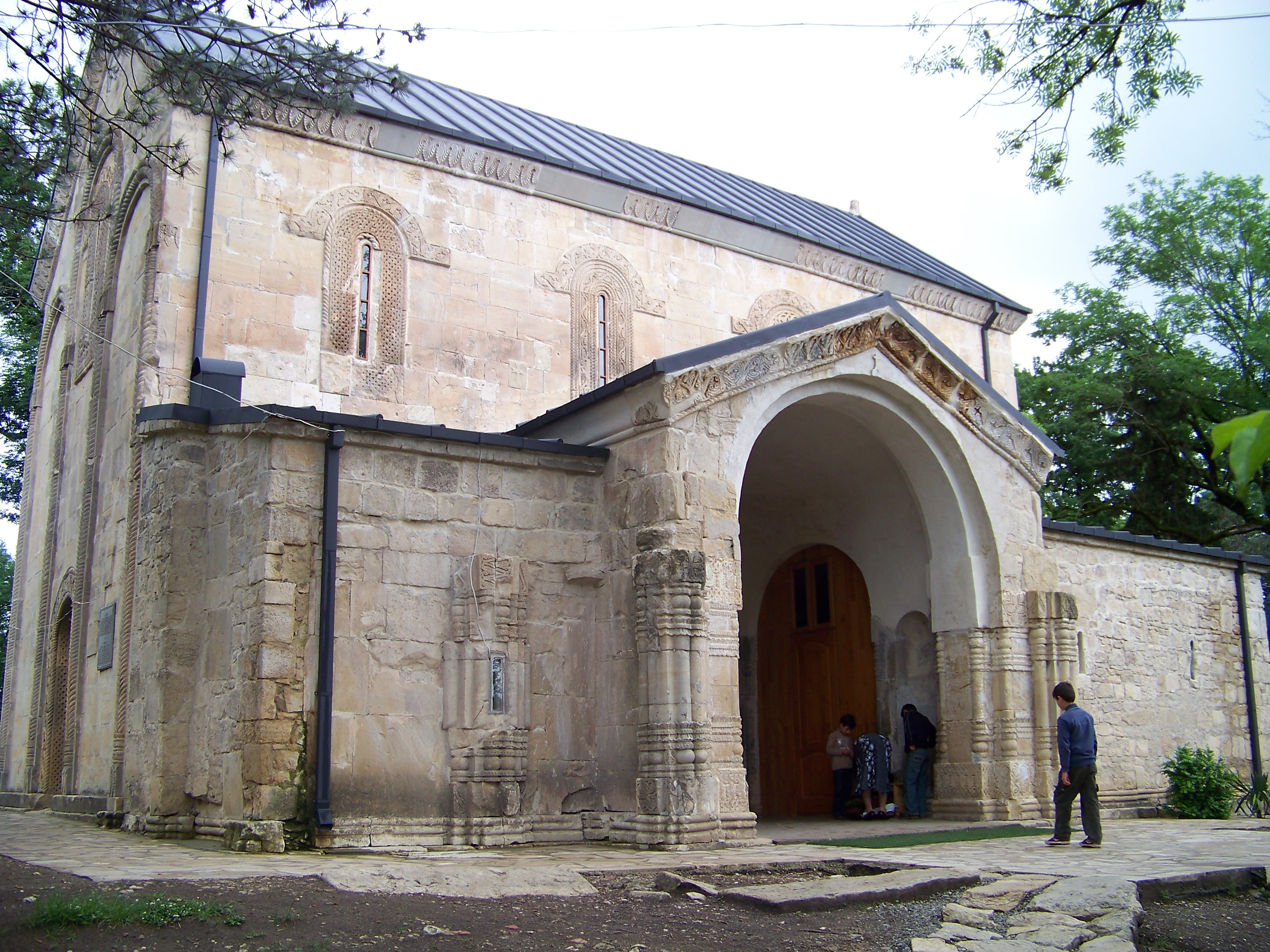
- Savane church. Southern façade.
- Interactive map of Savane church of Saint George
- Location: Savane, Sachkhere Municipality; Imereti, Georgia
- Coordinates: 42.322778°N 43.470556°E
- Type: Single-nave basilica

The Savane church of Saint George (Georgian: სავანის წმინდა გიორგის ეკლესია, romanized: savanis ts'minda giorgis ek'lesia) is an 11th-century Georgian Orthodox church in the western Georgian region of Imereti. A single-nave basilica built in 1046, the church has harmonious proportions, ornamented iconostasis, and exquisite decorative masonry details on the exterior façades. The church is inscribed on the list of Georgia's Immovable Cultural Monuments of National Significance.

== History ==
The Savane church stands on a hill on the left bank of the Qvirila River, a tributary of the Rioni, in the centre of the eponymous village, in the Sachkhere Municipality, Imereti region. Prince Vakhushti of Kartli, in his Description of the Kingdom of Georgia written in 1745, erroneously claims that the church, with its iconostatis, was hewn out of a single rock. This error was then repeated by Marie-Félicité Brosset, who relied on the information provided by Dimitri Meghvinet-Ukhutsesi. In 1920, the church was studied in details by the Georgian historian Ekvtime Taqaishvili.

== Layout ==
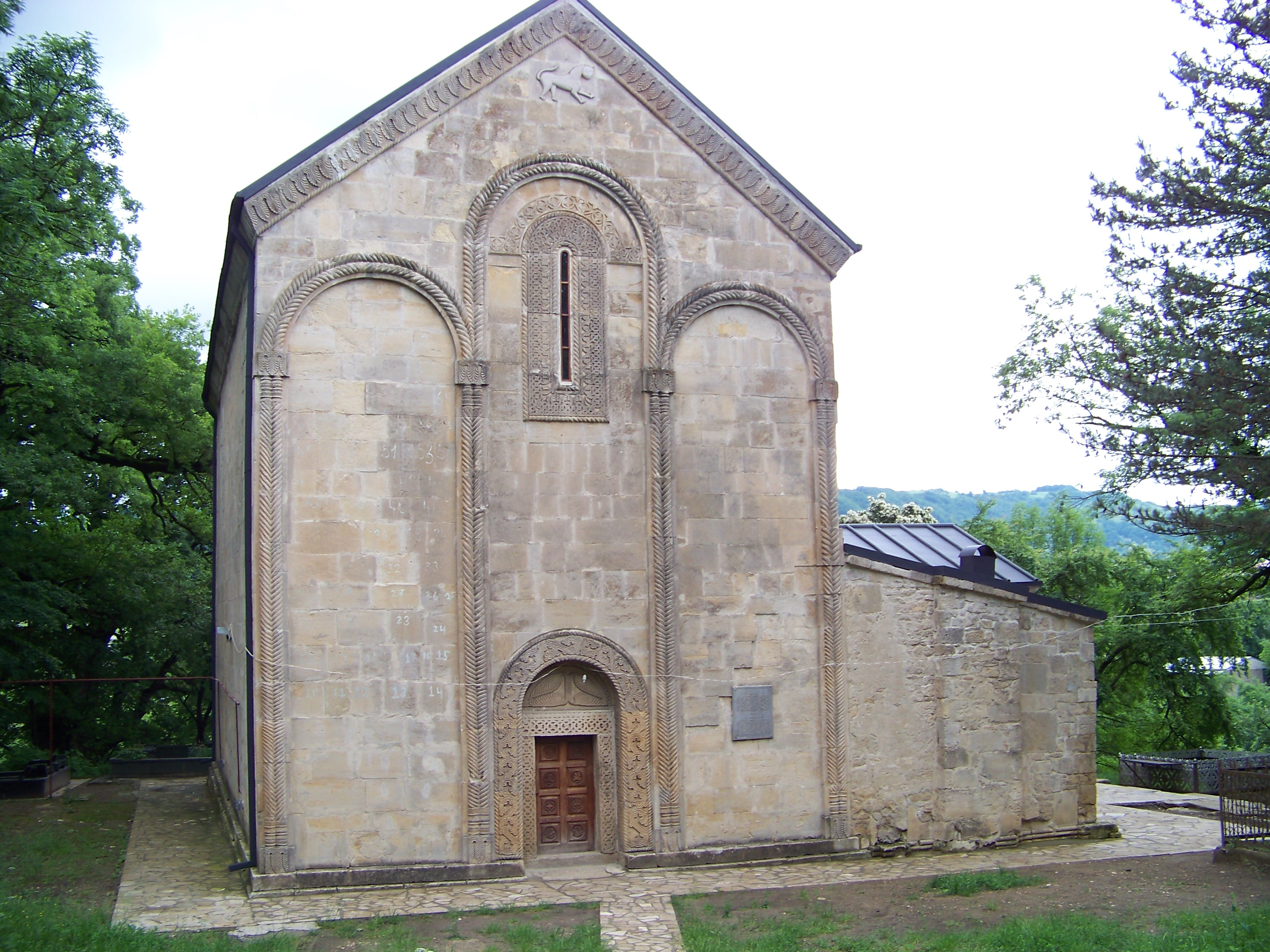
Western façade with decorated colonettes and door and window frames. Under the pediment, there is a bas-relief of a panther or lion.

The Savane church, dedicated to Saint George, is a single-nave basilica, made of neatly hewn, yellowish stones. It is rectangular in its plan, measuring externally 15.9 × 14.5 m., including the porch. The interior is covered with barrel vaulting on four supporting arches. In the main apse there are, on the right and on the left, two high, deep recesses which represent a prothesis and a diakonikon. There is another arched recess in the northern wall of the church, at the end of the iconostasis.

The iconostasis is a high structure, with a notched cornice and divided into two distinct parts; the lower formerly took the form of a compact wall, made of slabs of hewn stone, with a royal door in the middle, but later doors were made to the north and the south. The upper part, made of stucco, consists of three cinquefoil arches with cusps in the form of clover leaves, resting on four carved columns. The interior of the Savane church is whitewashed, and there is no trace of paintings. The church is lit with five windows, one each on the east and west, and three on the south. The doors are to the west and south. Later—no earlier than the 14th–15th century—a porch was built in front of the southern door with complex, engaged columns, set in a cluster, the capitals and bases carved; probably at a later date still, separate chambers were added to the porch on the east and west.

The façades of the church are all richly ornamented. The embellishments include carved, notched cornices, window and door frames adorned with carving of Georgian interlaced work, and carved tympani. The southern façade is partially disfigured by the later addition of a porch with its side chambers. Above the porch is a small belfry constructed in the 19th century.

=== Inscriptions ===
There are several inscriptions carved on the walls. The one on the southern façade, on the left of the window, below the archivolt, states that George, eristavt-eristavi ("duke of dukes"), built the church with the help of the Savane community: "In the name of God, I, George, eristavt-eristavi, have written this, and have given the half of this church to the Savane community. When I began to build the church they helped me with work, with money, with all things. May God give them happy use of it, for ever and ever". Another inscription, on the western tympanum, confirms that the Savane church was built by George in 1046, in the reign of King Bagrat IV of Georgia (1027–1072).
