= Zodi (village) =

Zodi ზოდი
- The view of the northern part of village

- Location within Georgia
- Coordinates: 42°20′35″N 43°18′16″E
- Country: Georgia
- Region: Imereti
- District: Chiatura Municipality
- Elevation: 630 m (2,070 ft)

Population (2014)
  - Total: 1,483
- Time zone: UTC+4 (Georgian Time)

Zodi (Georgian: ზოდი) is a village in Chiatura municipality, Imereti, Georgia. It is located on the Chiatura plateau, 630 m above the sea level. There is a sand quarry, mineral water springs and several archaeological sites in the village. From the north, Zodi is bounded by river Tsikhistskali (ციხისწყალი), running through deep limestone canyons.
