= Mghvimevi Monastery =

Cultural heritage monument in Georgia

Mghvimevi monastery
- მღვიმევის მონასტერი
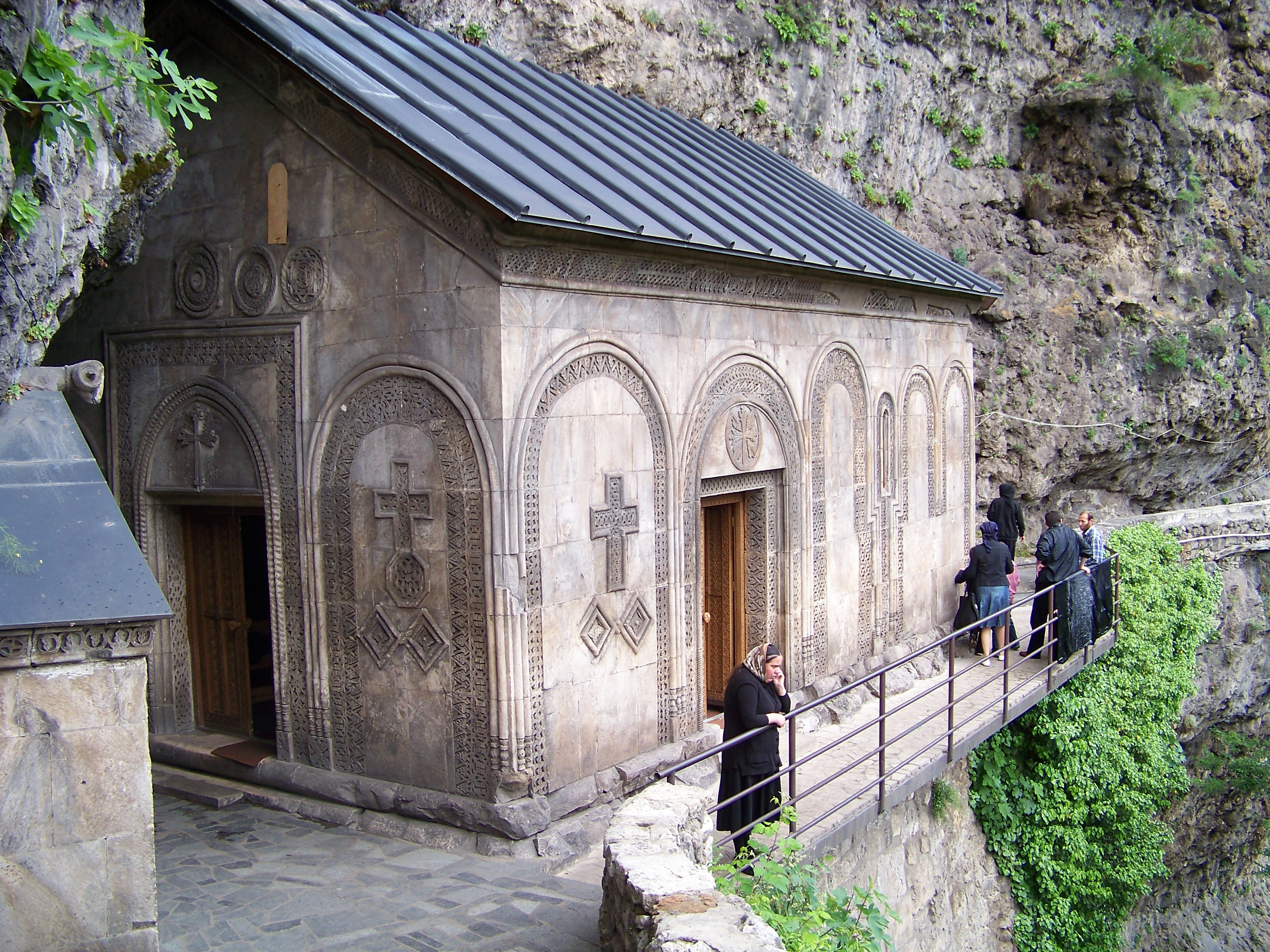
- Mghvimevi church of the Nativity of the Mother of God
- Interactive map of Mghvimevi monastery
- Location: Mghvimevi, Chiatura Municipality; Imereti, Georgia
- Coordinates: 42.297364°N 43.300727°E
- Type: Monastery complex

The Mghvimevi monastery (Georgian: მღვიმევის მონასტერი, romanized: mghvimevis monast'eri) is a Georgian Orthodox monastery in the western Georgian region of Imereti, near the town of Chiatura, partly carved into rock. Its main feature is a 13th-century two-nave basilica, dedicated to the Nativity of the Mother of God. The complex also includes a small hall church, bell-tower, and a circuit wall. The monastery is a functioning nunnery. It is rich in ornamental architectural sculpture which decorate the exterior of the churches. The Mghvimevi complex is inscribed on the list of Georgia's Immovable Cultural Monuments of National Significance.

== Location ==
The Mghvimevi monastery is situated in the eponymous village, in the Qvirila River valley, at the eastern edge of Chiatura, from where it can be accessed through a long and narrow cliffside pathway leading to a large natural cave, also known for its prehistoric finds. The monastery was founded here in the latter half of the 13th century, deriving its name from a Georgian word for "a cave". There are many smaller caves around the monastery. According to the 18th-century Georgian scholar Prince Vakhushti of Kartli they served as refuges during wartime; archaeologists recovered several arrowheads and traces of fire in the cave complex.

== Layout ==
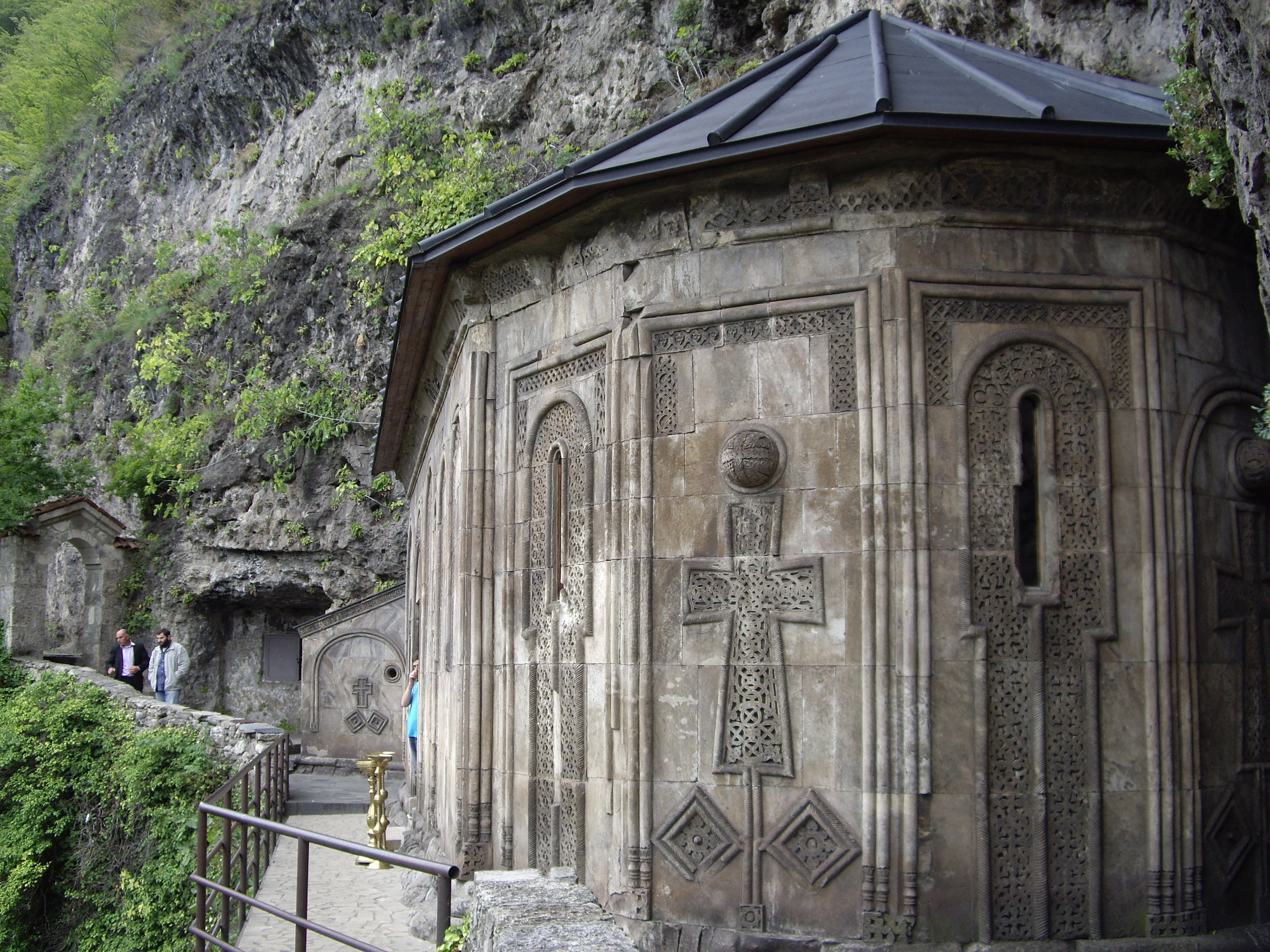
Eastern side of the main church, with the smaller church of St. Catherine seen in the background.

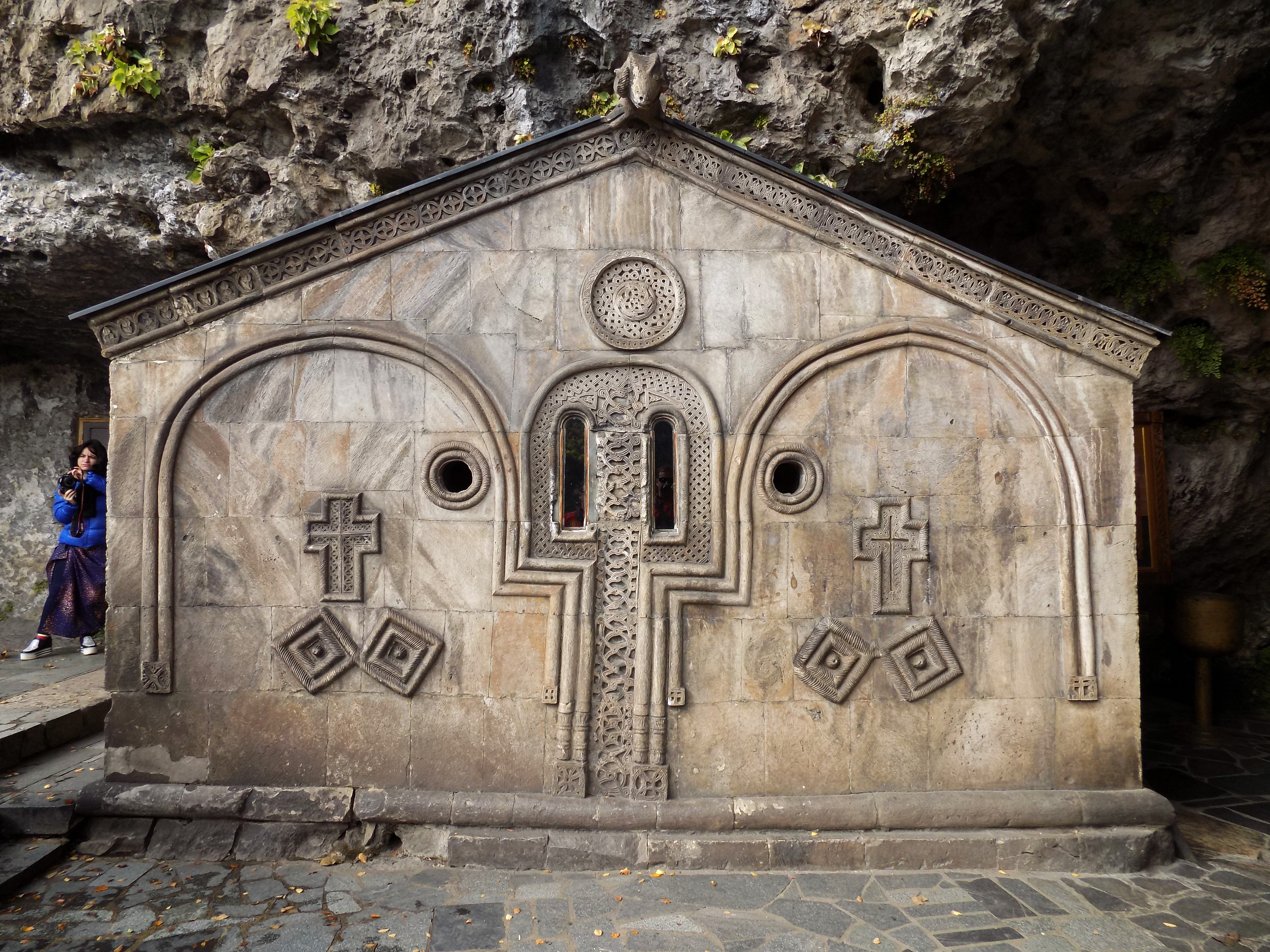
Mghvimevi church of St. Catherine

The Mghvimevi complex consists of several structures. East of the cave portal stands the main church, that of the Nativity of the Mother of God, a two-nave basilica. Its naves—the northern one narrower than the southern—are separated by a two-arched arcade supported by a single massive pillar. Both naves terminate in apses with faceted exteriors. The walls are built of stone, and faced with neatly hewn stone slabs, while a ceiling is cut into the adjoining rock. There is a painted wooden iconostasis, made in the 18th century, with the depictions of the Savior and Twelve Apostles as well as various scenes from the life of Jesus. The church has two doors, on the south and west. The west door was an 11th-century ornamented woodwork, removed for safekeeping to the Georgian National Museum in Tbilisi in 1920. The interior bear fragments of frescoes, including the portraits of the 13th-century church builders—Rati, eristavi of Racha of the Kakhaberidze family, his wife Rusudan, and his brother Niania—on the wall of the northern nave. The southern wall was repainted in the 16th century. The monastery housed several precious church items, including an 11th-century metalwork icon of the Supplication from Racha, now also preserved at the Georgian National Museum.

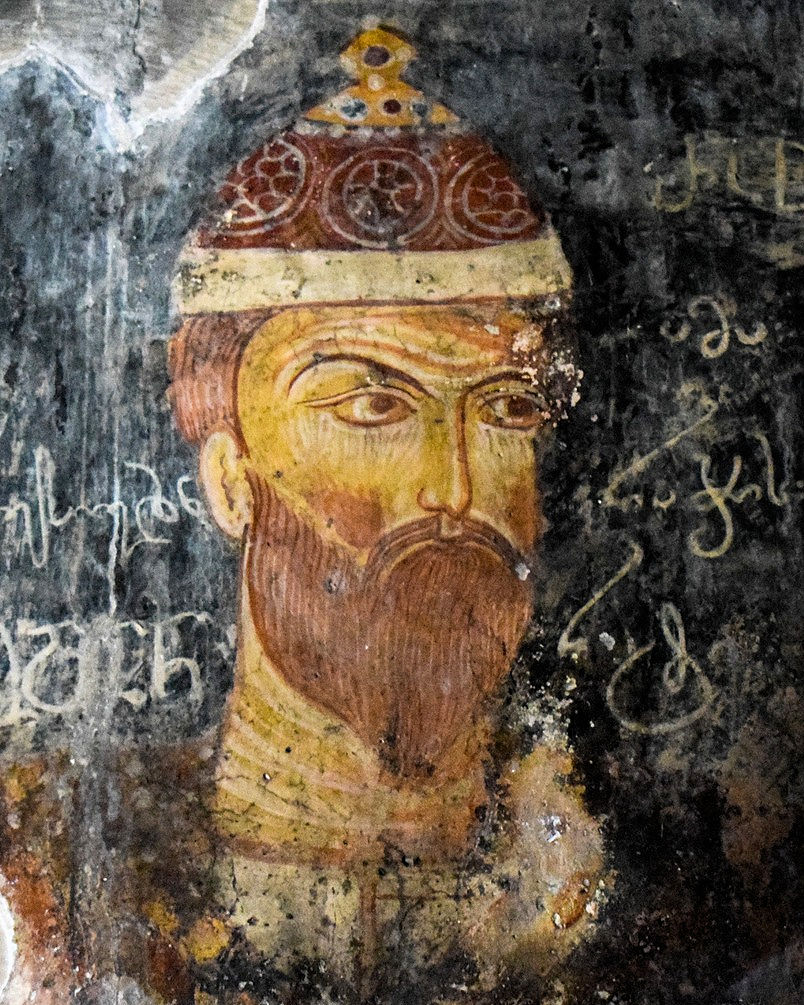
Rati, eristavi of Racha of the Kakhaberidze family, founder of the Mghvimevi monastery, 13th century.

At the opposite side of the cave portal is a small hall church, dedicated to St. Catherine. Its ceiling and west wall is hewn into rock, with the façade built of hewn stone slabs. There is a relief sculpture of a ram's head on the eastern wall and frescoes on the outer southern wall. Both of these churches are richly adorned with ornamented stone carvings, including decorative arches, window and door frames, sculpted crosses, and fretwork cornices. Despite the artistic value of individual elements in the architectural sculpture of Mghvimevi, the monastery buildings lack the overall integrity and craftsmanship characteristic for its contemporaneous monuments of medieval Georgia.

A bell-tower and monastic dwellings mostly date to the 19th century. There is also a set of buildings, part of the modern nunnery, founded in 2014.
