= Chiatura manganese deposit =

Manganese mine in Georgia

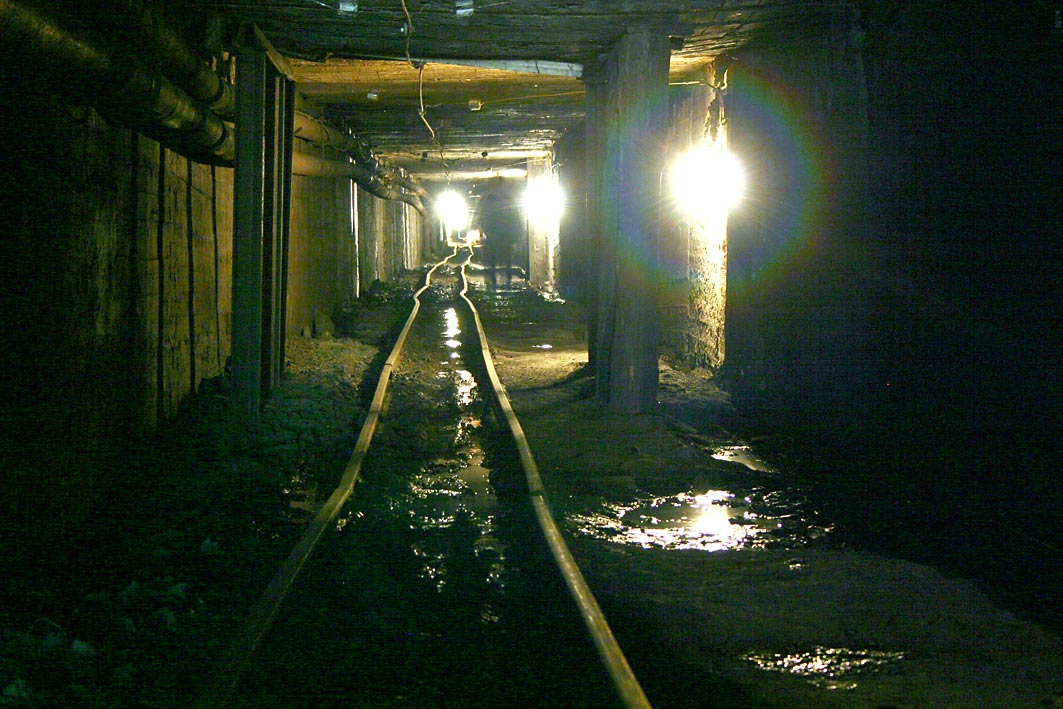
- A mine located near the town of Chiatura

- Location within Imereti Location within Georgia
- Location: Chiatura, Imereti region, Georgia; 42°15′N 43°17′E
- Products: Manganese
- Production: 1.18 million tonnes
- Opened: 1879
- Company: Georgian Manganese Holding

The Chiatura manganese deposit (Georgian: ჭიათურის მანგანუმის საბადო, romanized: ch’iaturis manganumis sabado; Russian: Чиатурское марганцевое месторождение, romanized: Chiaturskoye margantsevoye mestorozhdeniye) is located near the Dzirula Massif, located in central-western Georgia in the Imereti region west of the national capital Tbilisi. It is divided into parts by the Qvirila River and its tributaries. The center of the deposit development is the town of Chiatura.

Chiatura represents the largest manganese reserve in Georgia and one of the largest in the world, having estimated reserves of 239 million tonnes of manganese ore grading around 26% manganese metal. It consists mainly of sedimentary rocks of Mesozoic and Paleogene-Neogene age, which have a subhorizontal occurrence at an angle of 1-6° with a dip to the northeast. Manganese ores are located in ore layers of 30–35 cm in the amount of 3-18 pieces and alternate with opoka (a type of carbonate-siliceous sedimentary rock). Carbonate and oxidized layers are located in the upper part, and oxide ones in the lower part; in total, oxide ores – 26.5%, carbonate ores – 45.1%, oxidized – 15% and mixed – 14.4%.

== History and production ==
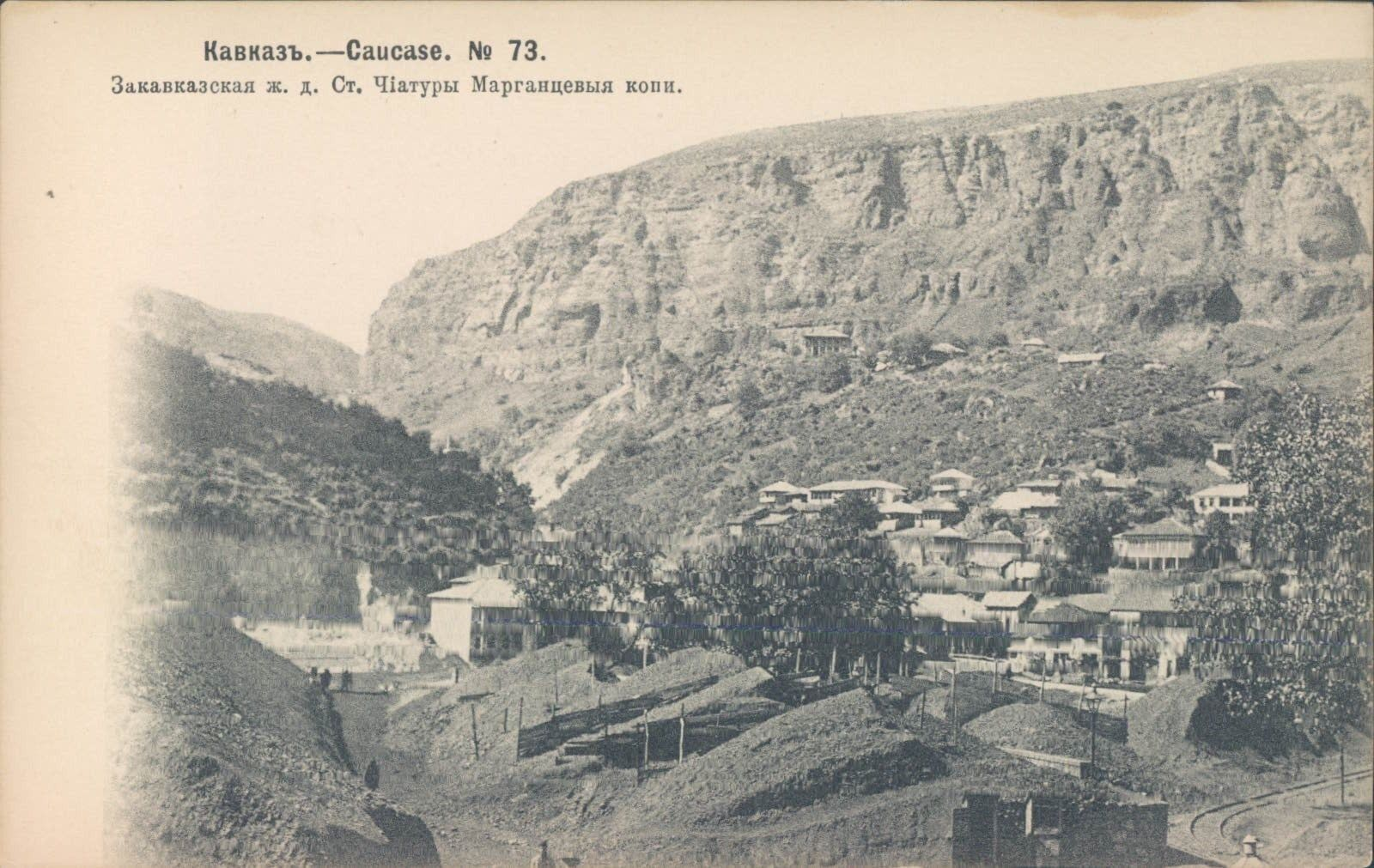
Chiatura manganese deposit, c. 1900s

The deposit was discovered in 1879 by the Georgian poet Akaki Tsereteli who explored the area in search of manganese and iron ores. After other explorations it was discovered that there are several layers of manganese oxide, peroxide and carbonate with thickness varying between 0.2 m (0.66 ft) and 16 m (52 ft). The deposit was finally proven to be commercial and the JSC Chiaturmanganumi company was set up to manage and exploit the huge deposit.

Before World War I, the German Krupp family was a major investor in Chiaturi’s manganese mines, which produced half of the world’s output in 1913. By the early 1920s, production had dropped to one-third of its peak due to Bolshevik confiscations and the withdrawal of foreign investment. In 1924, while Vladimir Lenin's New Economic Policy was in effect, American financier W. Averell Harriman invested $4 million to revive production through his own Georgian Manganese Company. Production rose from 436,000 tonnes to 772,000 tonnes in 1925, but costs soared due to falling manganese prices and necessary infrastructure improvements. By 1928, Harriman saw that continued operations at Chiaturi were not economically feasible and he negotiated a buyout agreement with the Soviet government.

The mines are currently owned by the JSC Chiaturmanganumi company (also known as JSC Chiaturmanganese), which was bought out by Georgian Manganese LLC, a subsidiary of the British company Stemcor.

== Mining facilities ==
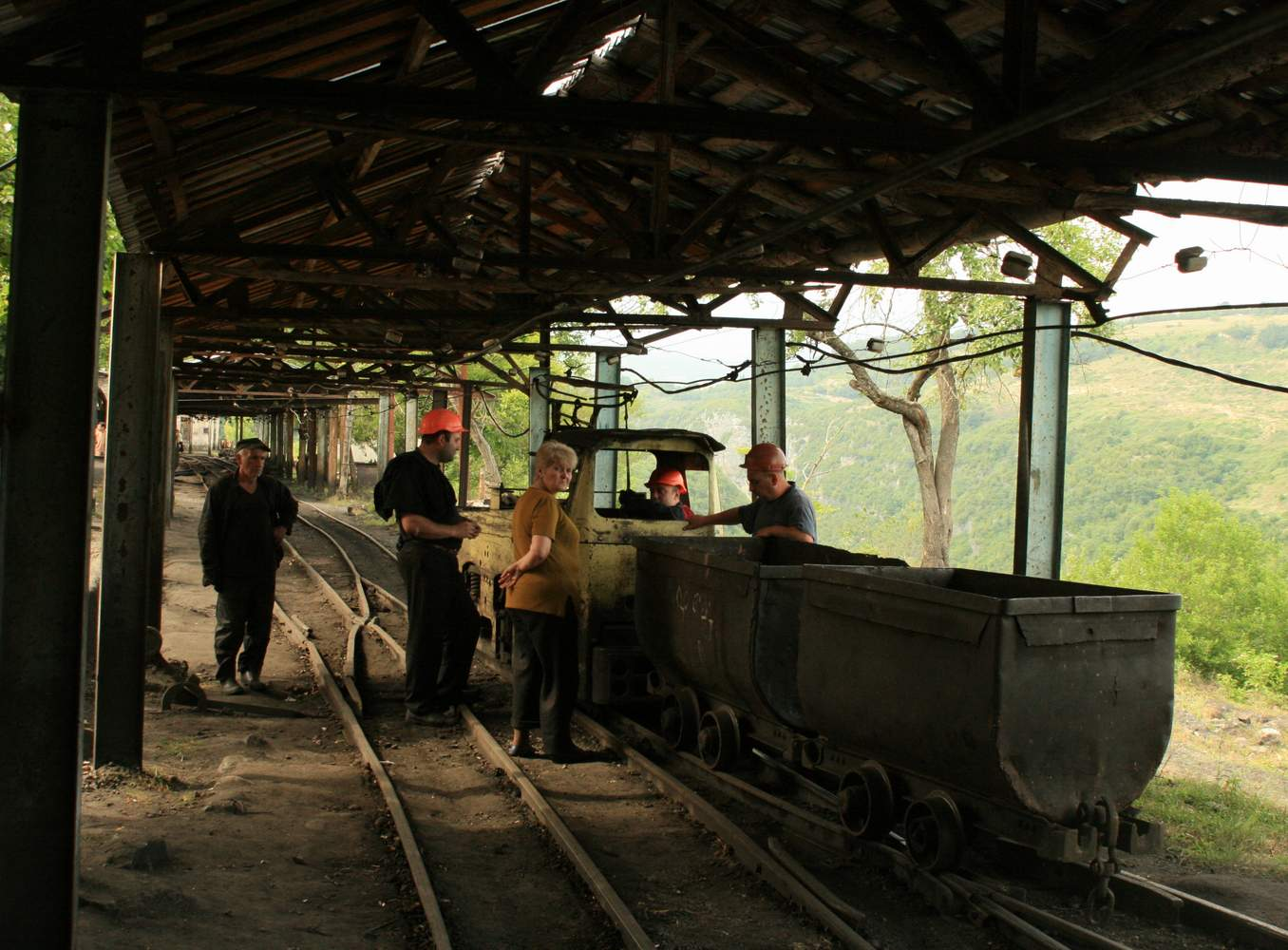
Mining near Chiatura

In 1972, facilities put into operation in Chiatura included new mines equipped with ore-dressing plants, a central final concentration plant for processing low-grade manganese ores into higher-grade ores, a central flotation plant, a plant for dressing carbonate ores, and a number of enterprises designed for improving the grade of ores. Extensive research has been carried out on the rationalization of manganese ore output, the use of slurry and low-grade ores, and the use of manganese as an agricultural fertilizer.

As of 1989, the deposit was mined using underground (62%) and open-pit (38%) methods. Mining was carried out depending on the type of ore, which was mined, including repeatedly, in previously mined areas. Transportation was carried out by both dump trucks and draglines.

The Chiatura mine complex which includes four underground mines and three open pit quarries has an annual production capacity of 1.18 million tonnes of manganese ore and 400,000 tonnes of manganese concentrates. The mine complex transports its manganese ore by rail to the ferroalloy plant located in Zestaponi.

== Ecological damage ==
During the century and a half of development of the mines, the requirements for environmental protection have almost never been met. A significant part of the territory of the city of Chiatura is covered with waste from manganese ore production, which creates a tuberculate, hilly relief. In the Qvirila River, the concentration of manganese is 600 mg/l, which is more than 50 thousand times higher than the average content in river waters; this gives it a specific grayish-black color. Dangerous heavy metals are washed out of the soil, contaminating the soil and groundwater.
