= Vladimer Gaprindashvili =

Georgian engineer

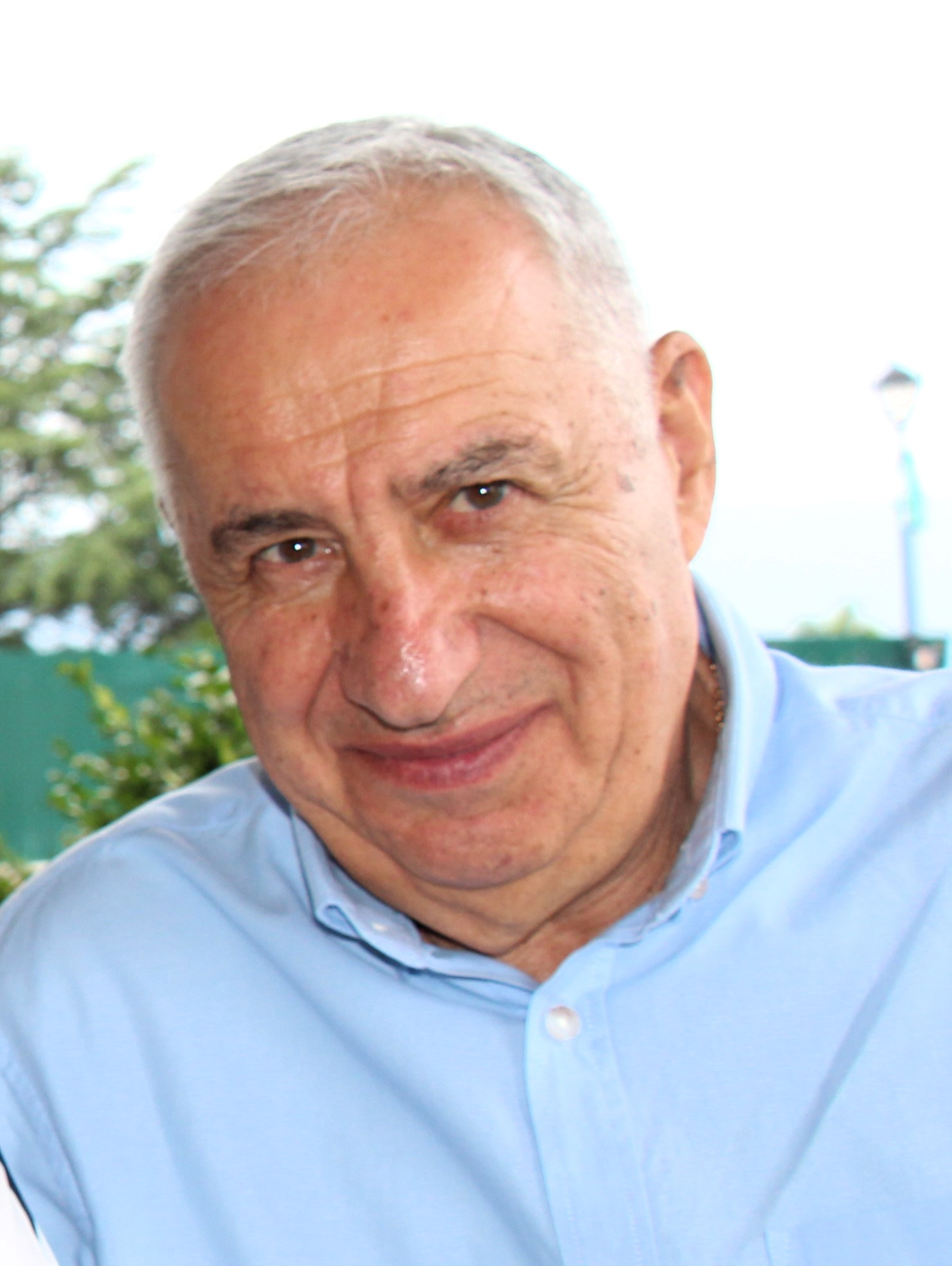
Vladimer Gaprindashvili 2024

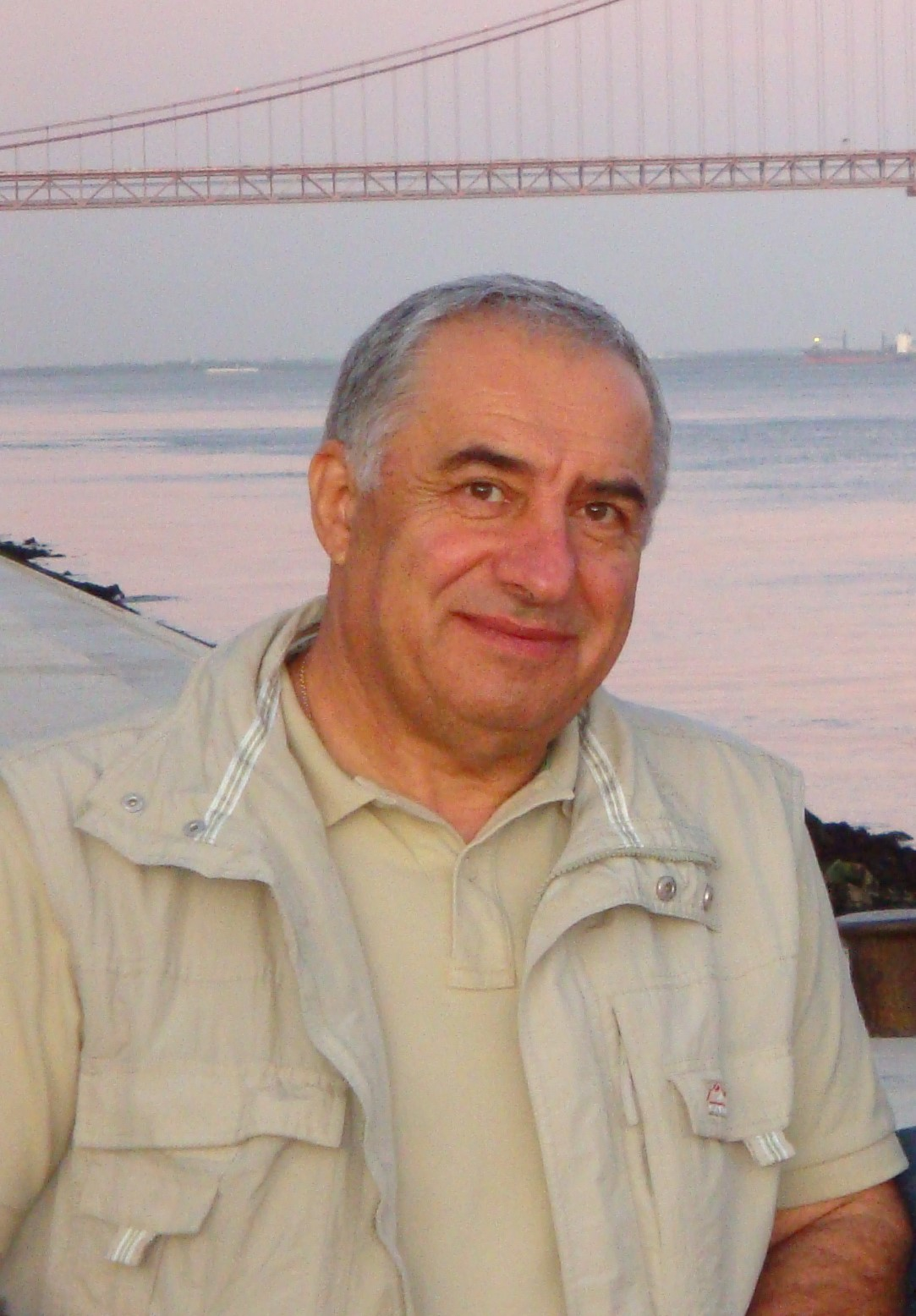
Vladimer Gaprindashvili 2009

Vladimer Gaprindashvili (born August 14, 1946, in Chiatura, Georgia) is a Georgian engineer recognized for his contributions to the country's gas industry.

Vladimer Gaprindashvili graduated from the Georgian Polytechnic Institute in 1971 and began his career in 1973 as an engineer with the Gas Networks and Regulatory Stations Office of "Tbilgas," under the Main Committee of Georgian Gasification. In 1978, he transitioned to "Saktransgazmretsvi," where he served as the Head of the Industrial Unit for Compression Stations. Between 1982 and 1985, he was sent to the Republic of Cuba on a business assignment, holding various positions.

Upon returning to Georgia in 1985, Gaprindashvili resumed his role at "Saktransgazmretsvi" as the Head of Industrial Operations for Compression Stations. In 1993, he was appointed Head of the Power-Mechanical Unit at the same company. He collaborated within the European Union's TACIS program and, in 1998, underwent professional training at "Gas de France" in France.

In 1999, Gaprindashvili was promoted to Deputy Head of the Saguramo Line-Industrial Division of "Saktransgazmretsvi," overseeing the main gas pipelines. With the establishment of the Georgian Gas Transportation Company in 2000, he became Chief Engineer of the Saguramo Line-Industrial Division and, in 2004, was promoted to Director of the same branch.

In 2005, Gaprindashvili was appointed Head of the Department for the Operation of Main Gas Pipelines and Gas Distribution Stations at "Gas Transportation Company of Georgia" Ltd. Since 2008, he has held the position of Head of Operations Service for Main Gas Pipelines and Gas Distribution Stations within the Engineering-Technical Provision Department.

Vladimer Gaprindashvili has received several state and industry awards, including the Ministry of Economy and Sustainable Development of Georgia title of "Honored Worker of the Gas Industry of Georgia."
