= Dzirula =

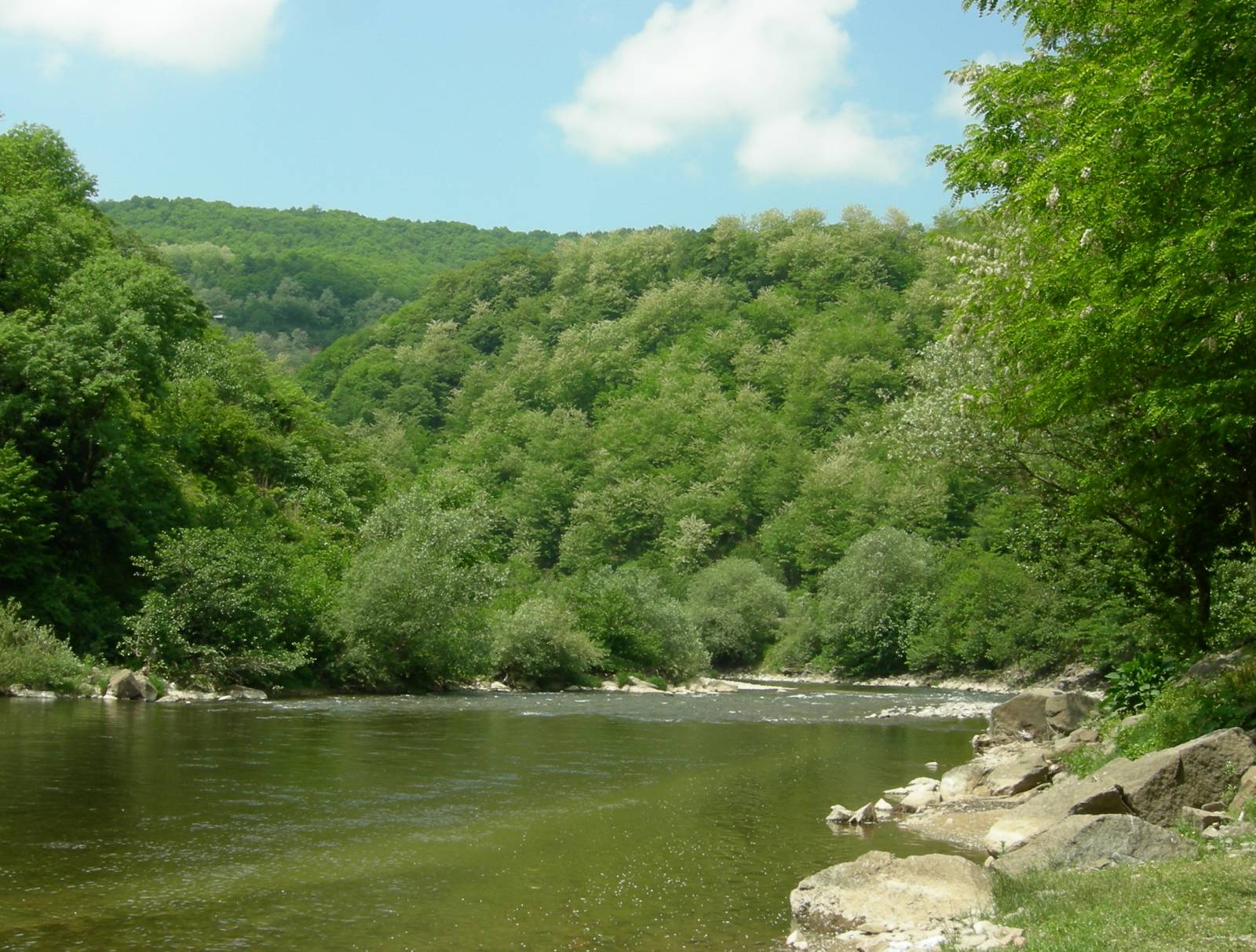
- The Dzirula near Kveda Tseva
- Native name: ძირულა (Georgian)

Location
- Country: Georgia

Physical characteristics
- Mouth: Qvirila
  - coordinates: 42.0897°N 43.0757°E
- Length: 83 km (52 mi)
- Basin size: 1,270 km^{2} (490 sq mi)

Basin features
- Progression: Qvirila→ Rioni→ Black Sea

The Dzirula (Georgian: ძირულა) is a river of Georgia. It is 83 km (52 mi) long, and has a drainage basin of 1,270 km^{2} (490 sq mi). It is a right tributary of the Qvirila, which it joins east of the western Georgia town of Zestaponi.
