= Duchy of Racha =

Subdivision of Georgia

16th. - 18th. centuries

Racha-Takveri in the 13th c. Georgia

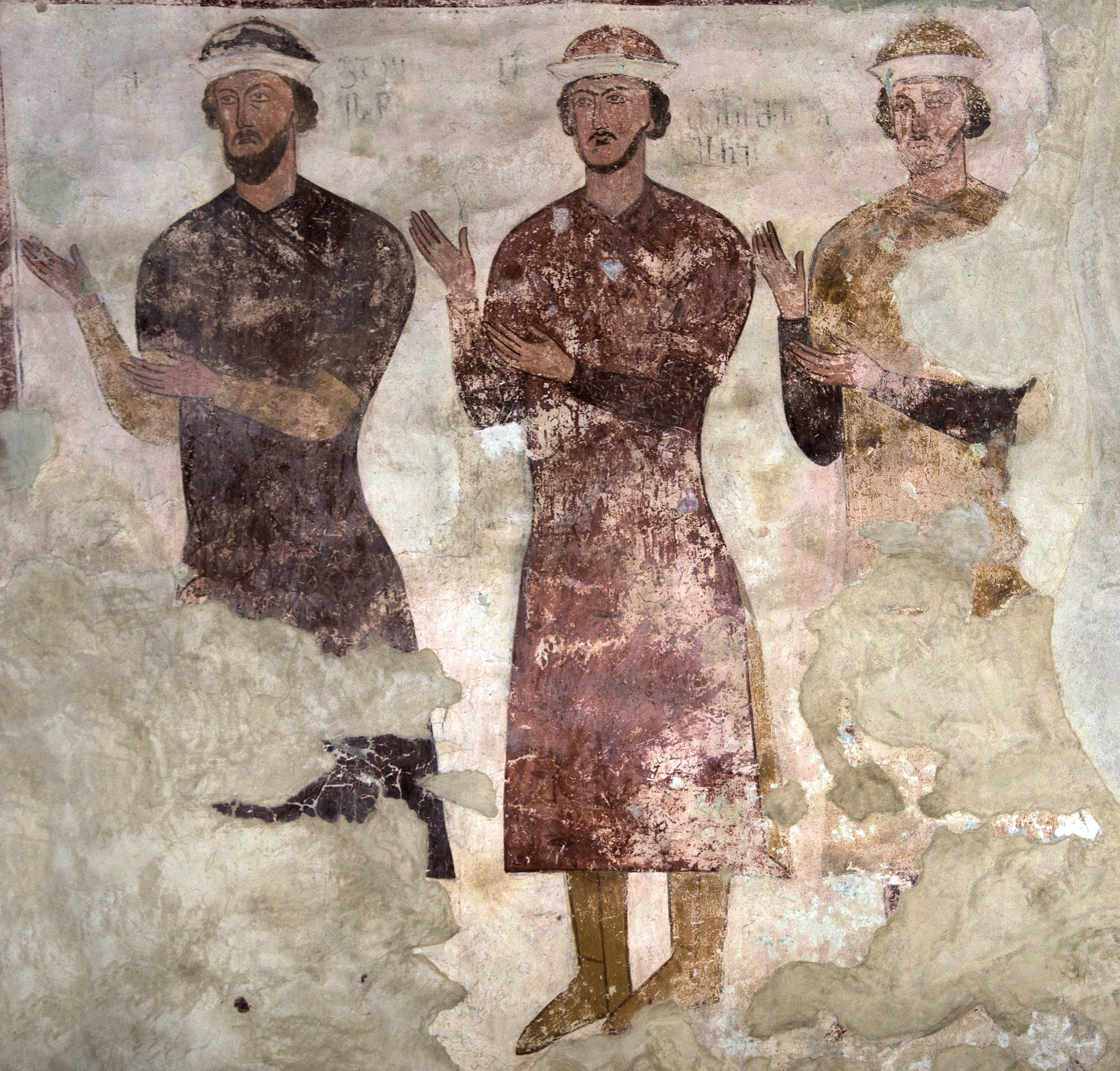
A fresco depicting the Charelidze, ducal family of Racha, Church of Crucifixion of Sori, Georgia

The Duchy of Racha (Georgian: რაჭის საერისთავო, rach'is saerist'avo) was an important fiefdom in medieval and early modern Georgia, located in the western province of Racha, in the upper Rioni Valley in the foothills of the Greater Caucasus crest, and ruled by a succession of eristavi ("dukes") from c. 1050 until being transferred to the royal crown in 1789.

== History ==
The duchy of Racha was founded c. 1050, when a branch of the Liparitid family, subsequently known as Kakhaberidze, was enfeoffed of it by King Bagrat IV of Georgia. Their possessions were further expanded under Queen Tamar of Georgia (r. 1184–1213). The Kakhaberidze were dispossessed of the duchy in 1278 for having revolted against David VI, but seem to have maintained themselves in Racha into the 15th century. The House of Japaridze possibly held the Duchy of Racha between the dispossession of the Kakhaberidze and the establishment of Charelidze family. By the end of the 15th century, the duchy of Racha seems to have been restored, under the Charelidze family, whose brief tenure was succeeded by the House of Chkheidze c. 1488, when Prince Ivane Chkheidze (r. 1488–1497) was invested with Racha by Alexander II, King of Imereti.

Over time, these new masters of Racha – henceforth known as the Eristavi of Racha – significantly expanded their possessions, confiscating estates of other noble families and even those belonging to the crown. They were embroiled in incessant feudal wars that plagued Georgia at that time, frequently changing their side as they sought to achieve more autonomy from the kings of Imereti. The powerful duke Rostom (r. 1750–1769) was able to maintain Racha virtually independent, eventually to be defeated and removed from office by King Solomon I of Imereti, who turned Racha into a royal domain. His successor David II restored the duchy to Rostom's grandson and his own sisterly nephew Anton in 1784. The rival noble clans, especially Tsulukidze and Tsereteli, attempted to counter the move by enrolling a force of Ottoman and Dagestan mercenaries, only to be routed by the royal army in 1786. This restoration proved to be short-lived and the next Imeretian king, Solomon II, finally annexed the duchy in 1789.

== Known dukes ==
=== Kakhaberidze ===
- Kakhaber I (died 1088)
- Niania (1088–1120)
- Kakhaber II (1175–1210)
- Kakhaber III (1245–1278)
- Kakhaber VI Orbeli

Kakhaberidze-Chidjavadze (Duke of Racha?) Prince-Chamberlain of Georgia, f a. 1405

=== Chkheidze ===
- Ivane (1488–1497)
- Kakhaber IV (1497–1510)
- Shoshita I (1534–1570)
- Papuna I (1651–1661)
- Shoshita II (1661–1684)
- Papuna II (1684–1696)
- Shoshita III (1696–1732)
- Gregory (1732–1743)
- Vakhtang (1743–1750)
- Rostom (1750–1769)
- Anton (1784, 1787–89)
- George (1784–1787)
