= Kakhaberidze =

Georgian noble family

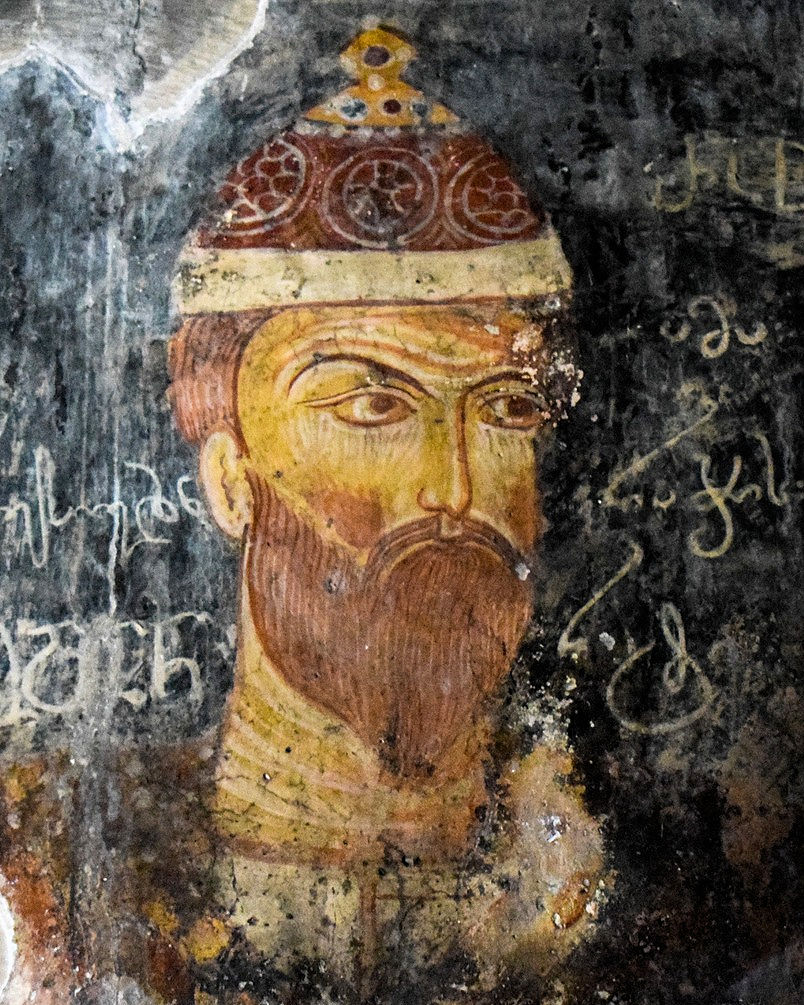
Rati, eristavi of Racha of the Kakhaberidze family, founder of the Mghvimevi monastery, 13th century.

The House of Kakhaberidze, archaically Kakhaberisdze (pl. -ebi) (Georgian: კახაბერი[ს]ძე[ები], literally "the sons of Kakhaber") was a noble family in medieval Georgia which held sway over the highland northwestern Georgian province of Racha from the 11th or 12th century to the 13th. The Kakhaberidze were a branch of the Liparitid-Baguashi, their dynastic name being derived from its early member Kakhaber known from a few inscriptions from Racha.

== History ==
By 1184, when Queen Tamar of Georgia ascended the throne, the Kakhaberidze had been in possession of both Racha and the neighboring district of Takveri, bearing the title of "Duke of Dukes" (eristavt-eristavi). Kakhaber (II) Kakhaberidze, together with Archbishop Anton of Kutaisi, placed the crown upon Tamar's brow at a ceremony held at the Gelati Monastery. His descendant, and probably a grandson, Kakhaber (III), was powerful enough to defy royal authority and play King David VI and his Mongol overlords against one another. By c. 1278, Kakhaber had been defeated, blinded and exiled at the king's order. His property was confiscated by the crown. The Kakhaberidze seem to have retained Racha into the early 15th century, but then disappeared into oblivion. Their descendants, the house of Chichua (ჩიჩუა), became a prominent family in the western Georgian region of Mingrelia while the house of Chijavadze (ჩიჯავაძე), another branch of the Kakhaberidze line, continued to play an important role in the western Georgian kingdom of Imereti. Eventually, both noble houses were confirmed as princes (knyaz) under Russian rule in the 19th century.
