= Chiatura Municipality =

Coordinates: 42°17′N 43°17′E

Chiatura Municipality ჭიათურის მუნიციპალიტეტი
- Municipality
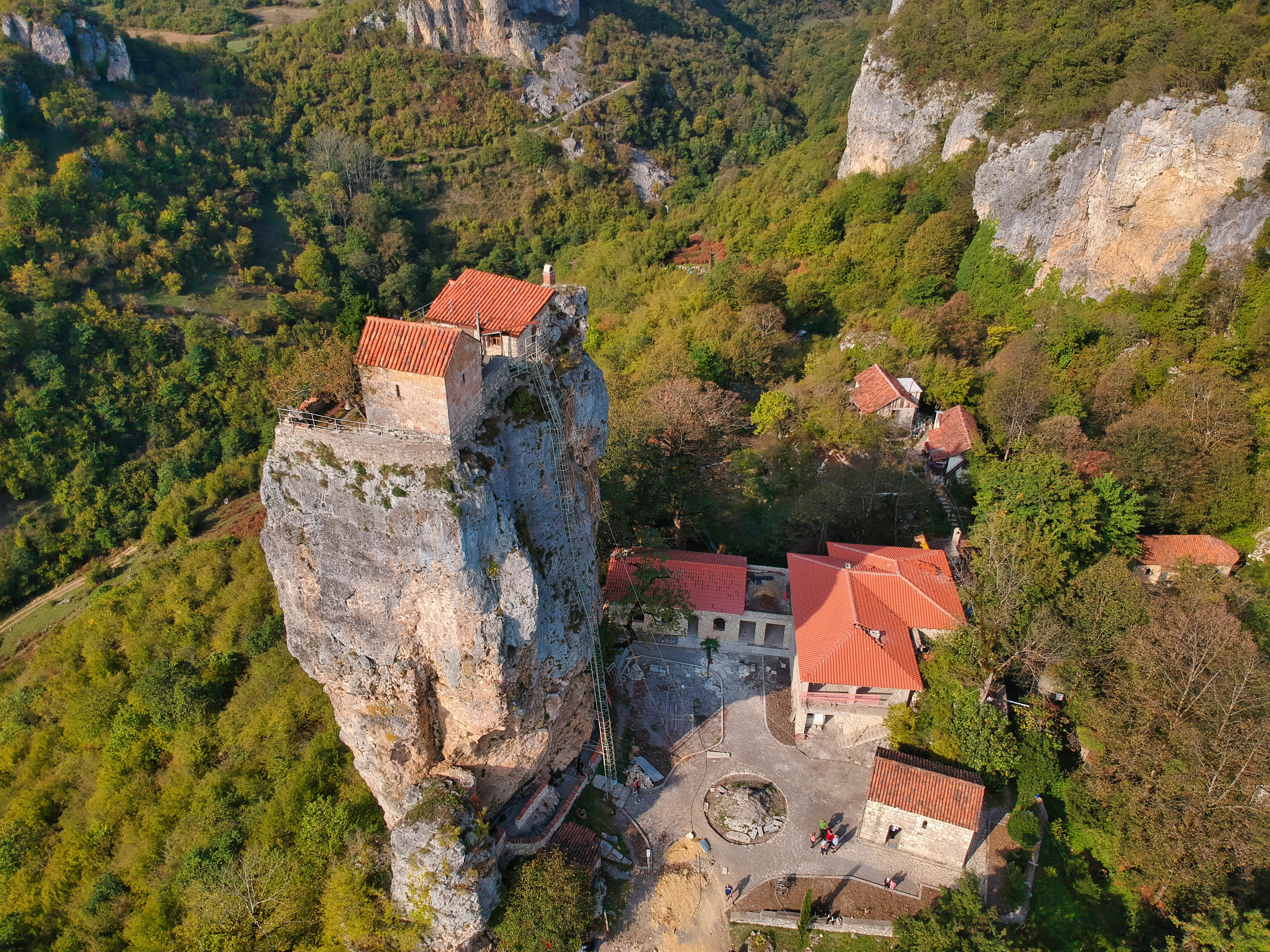
- Katskhi Pillar

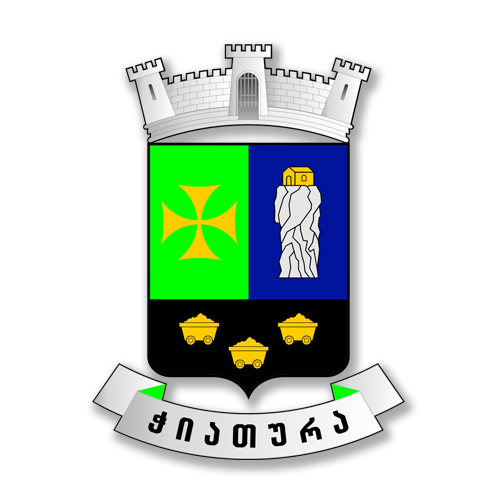
- Flag Seal

- Chiatura Municipality within Georgia
- Country: Georgia
- Region: Imereti
- Capital: Chiatura

Government
  - Type: Mayor–Council
  - Mayor: Givi Modebadze (GD)
  - Municipal Assembly: 36 members: • Georgian Dream (26); • Ahali (5); • For Georgia (2); • Strategy Aghmashenebeli (1); • Lelo for Georgia (1); • People's Power (1)

Area
  - Total: 555.3 km^{2} (214.4 sq mi)

Population (2024)
  - Total: 36,997
  - Density: 66.63/km^{2} (172.6/sq mi)

Population by ethnicity
  - Georgians: 99.6 %
  - Armenians: 0.2 %
  - Others: 0.2 %
- Time zone: UTC+4 (Georgian Standard Time)

Chiatura Municipality (Georgian: ჭიათურის მუნიციპალიტეტი, romanized: ch'iaturis munitsip'alit'et'i) is a municipality in the Imereti region (mkhare) of Georgia. Its administrative centre is the town of Chiatura, located in the valley of the Qvirila River.

The municipality is known for its manganese deposits, whose exploitation began in 1879 and shaped the industrial development of Chiatura. It also contains archaeological sites, including Dzudzuana Cave, and historical landmarks such as Mghvimevi Monastery and Katskhi Pillar. According to the 2024 census, the municipality had a population of 36,997 inhabitants.

== Geography and location ==
Chiatura Municipality is located on the Chiatura Plateau, in the Imereti region of western Georgia, within the narrow valley of the Qvirila River. The capital Chiatura lies at an elevation of 340–500 metres above sea level. The Gomi-Sachkhere-Zestafoni highway passes through the municipality, connecting it with surrounding areas. The landscape is characterized by mountainous terrain, river valleys and rocky formations, with numerous caves found in the canyons of the Qvirila and Djruchula rivers.

== Climate ==
Chiatura Municipality has a humid subtropical climate, characterized by cold winters and relatively dry, hot summers. The average annual temperature is approximately 13 °C, with average temperatures of 2 °C in January and 23 °C in July. Absolute temperatures range from a minimum of −20 °C to a maximum of 42 °C. The annual precipitation averages 1,100 mm.

== History ==
The area of Chiatura Municipality has evidence of inhabitation since early humans. Caves preserved in the cliffs surrounding Chiatura provide such evidence, with historical sources claiming that local inhabitants sought refuge in these caves during the invasions of caliph Marwan II, at elevation of 340–500 metres above sea level. In 2009, more than 1,500 flax and wool fibres, dating to 34,000 years ago, were discovered in Dzudzuana Cave, providing evidence of prehistoric weaving.

The development of the municipality was shaped by the exploitation of its manganese deposits in the Qvirila River valley, which began in 1879 on the initiative of Georgian poet Akaki Tsereteli. The centre of the mining basin was the city Chiatura, and expanded out to seven more villages: Rgani, Tabagrebi, Mgvimevi, Darkveti, Perevisa, Shukruti, and Itkhvisi. English investment followed in 1892, and by 1895, a railway connected Chiatura with Shorapani, facilitating the transportation of manganese ore. At the time, the mines employed thousands of workers and reportedly supplied up to half of global manganese demand. The municipality also contains several historical and architectural landmarks, including the 13th-century Mghvimevi Monastery and the Katskhi Pillar.

== Demographics ==
Based on the 2024 Georgia census, published by the National Statistics Office of Georgia, Chiatura had a population of 36,997 inhabitants. The municipality's area of 555.3 square kilometres (214.4 sq mi) gives it a population density of 66.63 inhabitants per square kilometre. The population declined by an annual rate of 0.75% since the 2014 census which listed 39,884 inhabitants. The population has almost halved since the 1989 census which listed 68,719 inhabitants.

According to the 2024 census, females accounted for 51.8% (19,148) of the population, while males made up 48.2% (17,849). The age structure was characterised by a relatively large elderly population, with 25.3% (9,366) inhabitants aged 65 and over, compared to 16.9% (6,253) aged 0–14. The working age population (15–64 years) accounted for 57.8% (21,378) of the total. Regarding settlement patterns, 61.7% (22,839) of the population lived in rural areas, while 38.3% (14,158) resided in urban areas.

According to the 2014 census, internally displaced persons (IDPs) accounted for 300 inhabitants (0.8% of the population), while the remaining 99.2% (39,600) were not registered as internally displaced. The municipality was ethnically homogeneous, with ethnic Georgians comprising 99.6% of the population (39,708), alongside 76 Armenians and 97 inhabitants from other ethnic groups. In terms of religious affiliation, the Georgian Orthodox Church was predominant, accounting for 99.5% of the population (39,515 inhabitants). Other religious affiliations were reported by 174 inhabitants, while 34 people declared no religious affiliation.

== Politics ==
Chiatura Municipal Assembly (Georgian: ჭიათურის საკრებულო) is a representative body in Chiatura Municipality, consisting of 36 members and elected every four years. The last election was held in October 2021.

Party	2017	2021	Current Municipal Assembly
Georgian Dream	28	26	
Ahali		5 (Note: Split from UNM.)	
For Georgia		2	
Strategy Aghmashenebeli		1	
Lelo		1	
People's Power		1 (Note: Split from GD.)	
United National Movement	3		
European Georgia	1		
Alliance of Patriots	1		
Total	33	36	

== Gallery ==
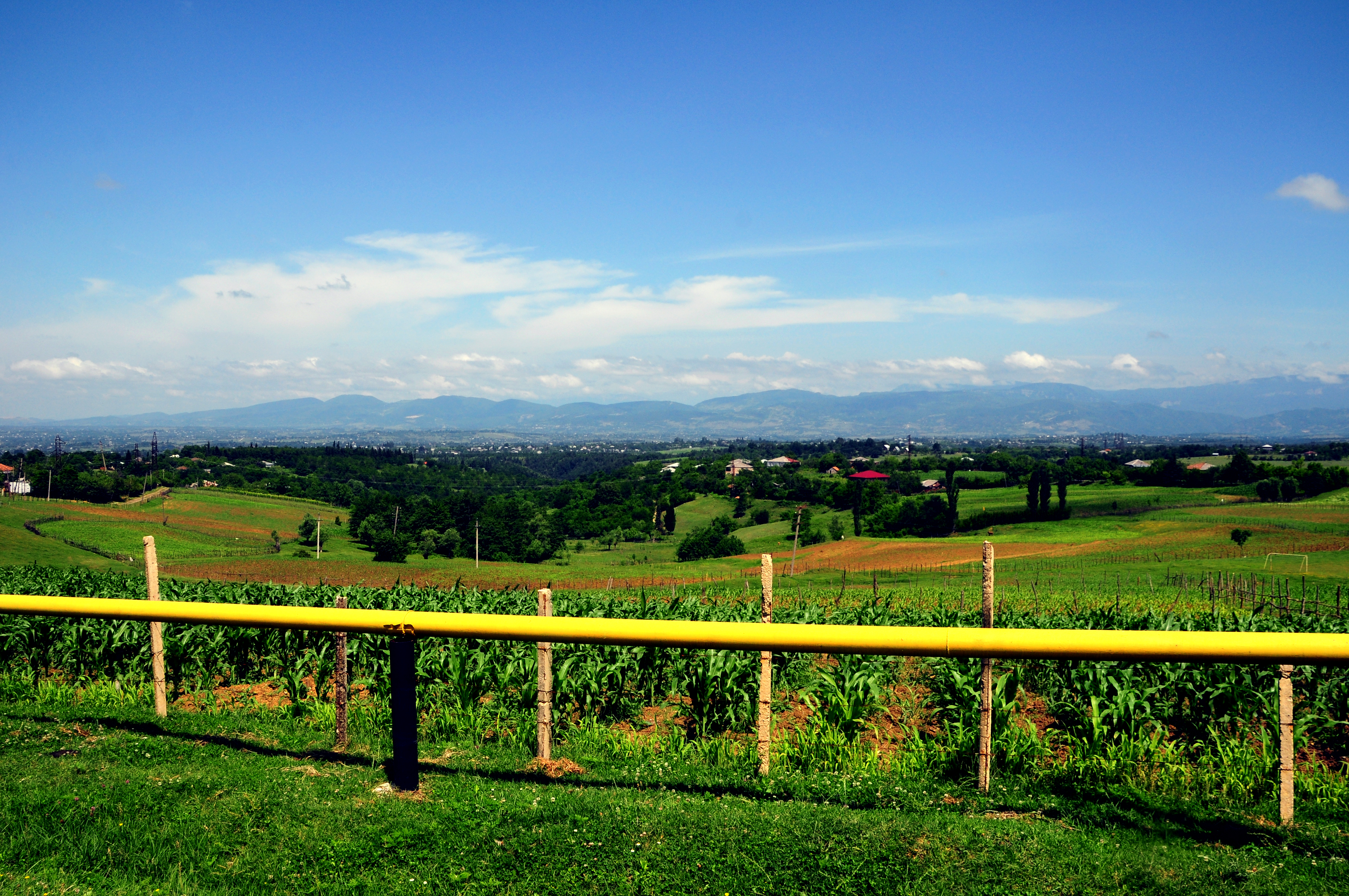

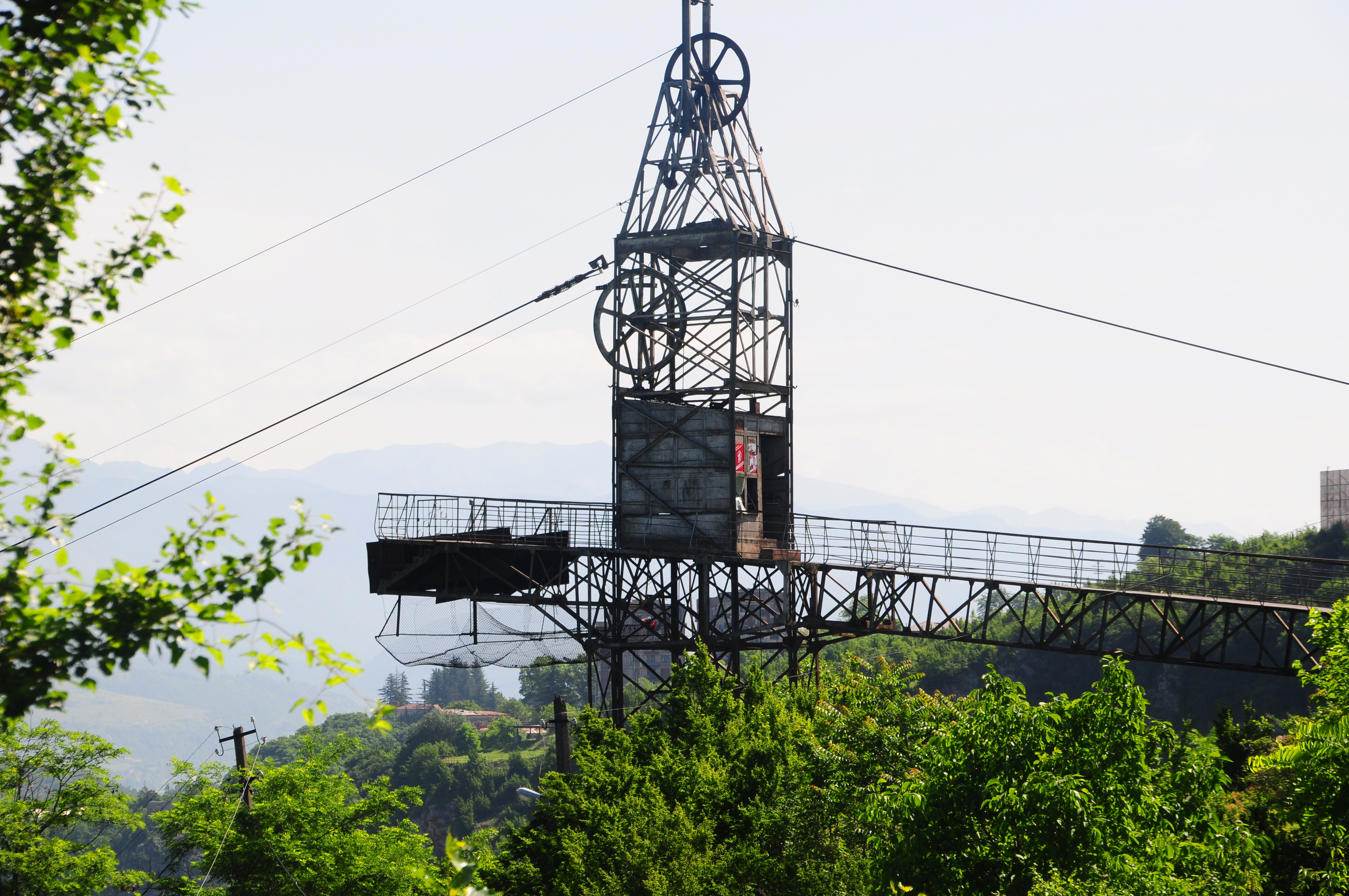

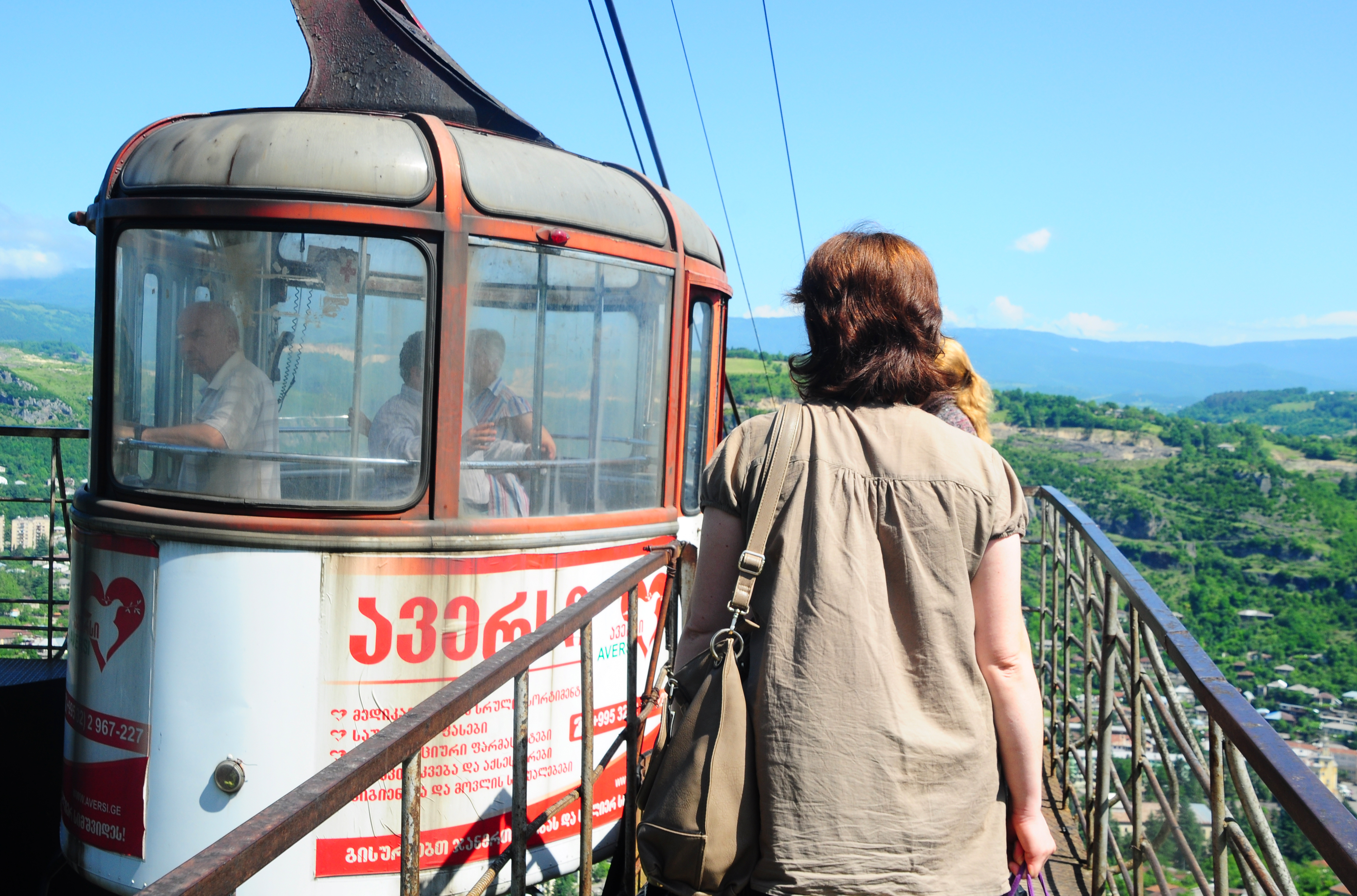

== See also ==
- List of municipalities in Georgia (country)
