= Chiatura =

City in Imereti, Georgia

Chiatura ჭიათურა
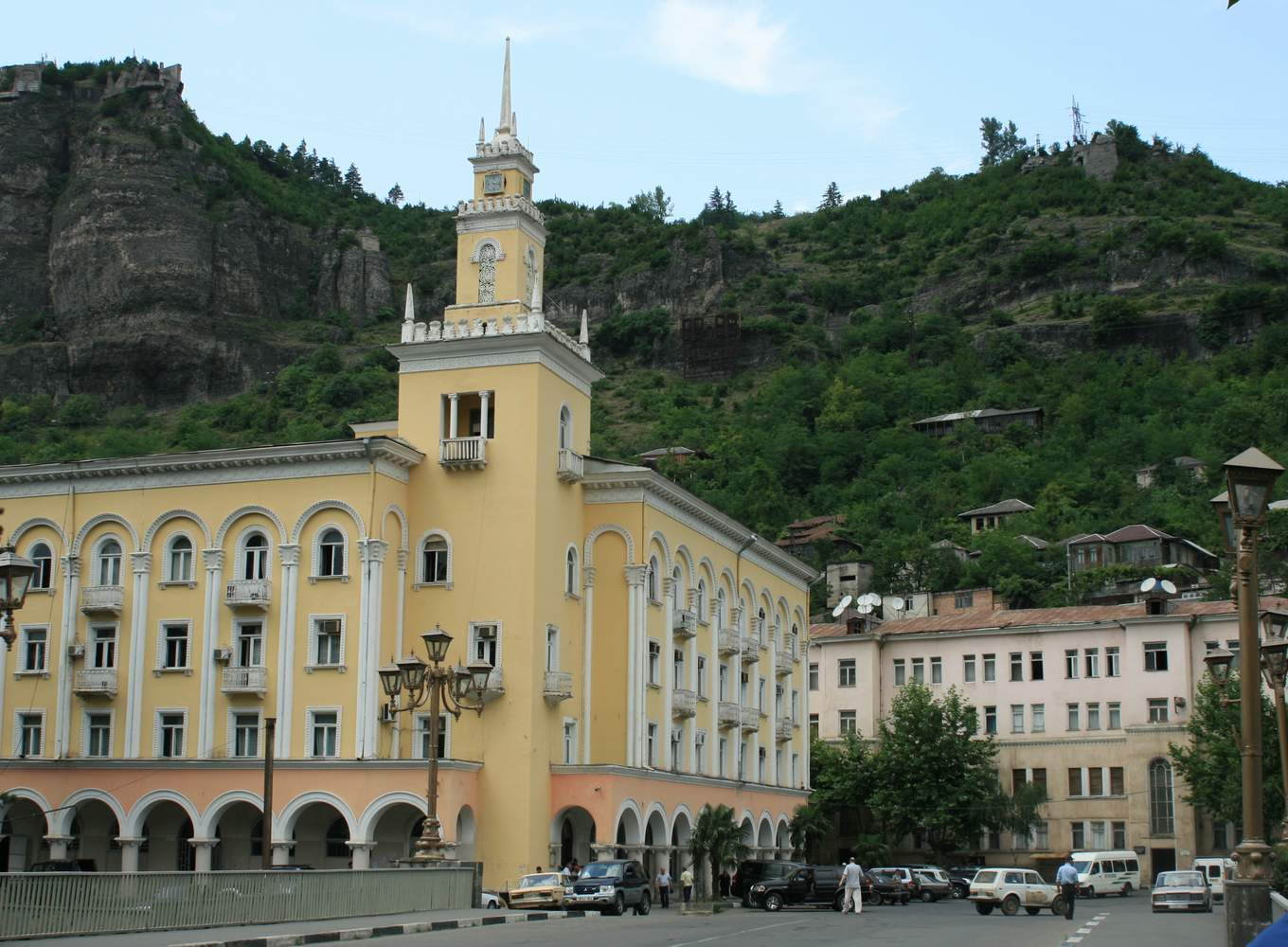
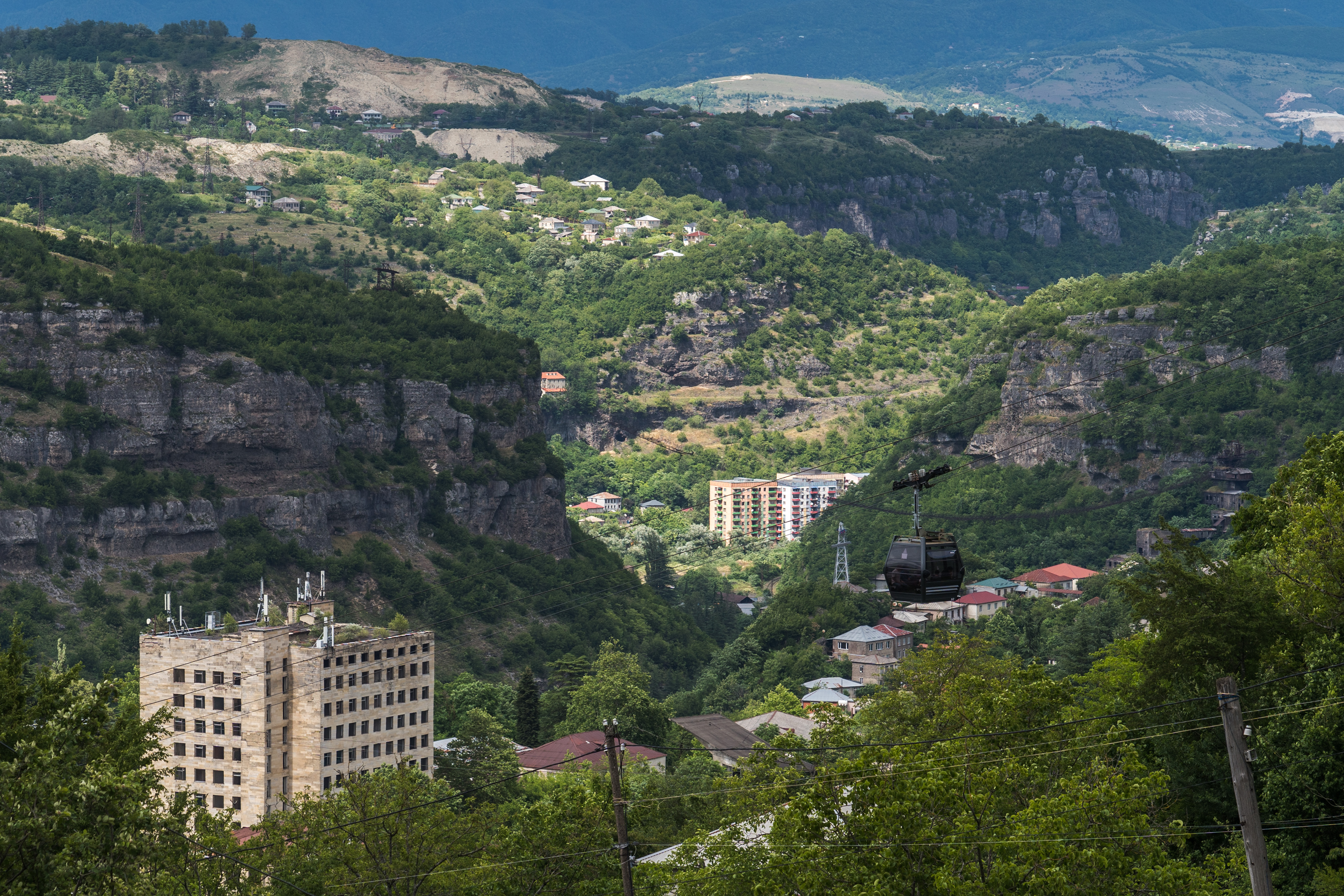

- Location within Georgia Location within Imereti
- Coordinates: 42°17′25″N 43°16′55″E
- Country: Georgia
- Mkhare: Imereti
- District: Chiatura

Population (January 1, 2024)
  - Total: 12,049
- Time zone: UTC+4 (Georgian Time)
- Climate: Cfb

Chiatura (Georgian: ჭიათურა, romanized: ch'iatura [t͡ʃʼiät̪ʰuɾä]) is a city in the Imereti region of Western Georgia. It is located in a mountainous valley on the banks of the Qvirila River and is historically known as one of the most significant mining towns of Georgia. Apart from mining activity, Chiatura also attracts visitors due to its system of cable cars connecting the city's center to the surrounding hills.

== Geography and history ==
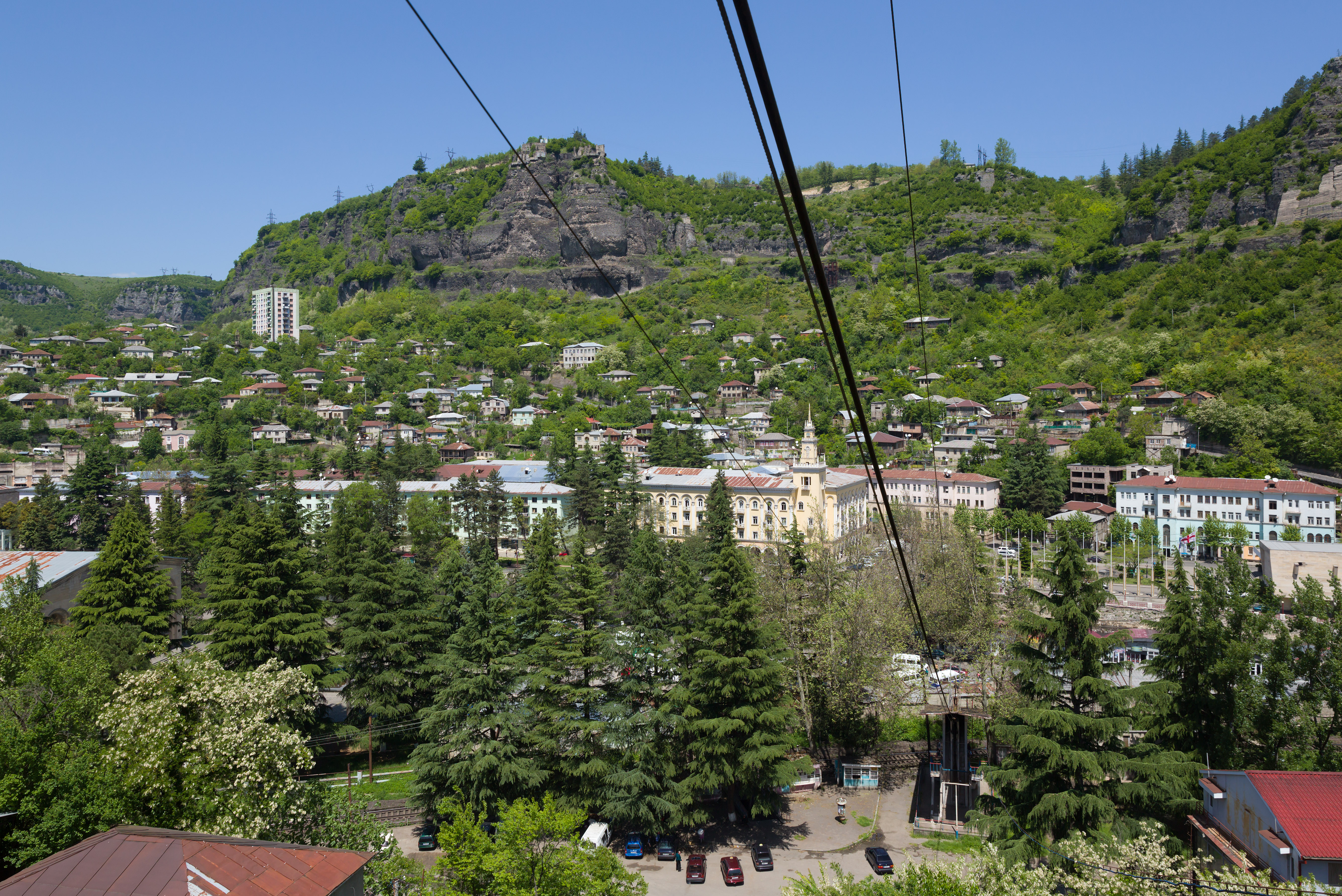
A cablecar in Chiatura

In 1879 the Georgian poet Akaki Tsereteli explored the area in search of manganese and iron ores, discovering deposits in the area. After other intense explorations it was discovered that there are several layers of commercially exploitable manganese oxide, peroxide and carbonate with thickness varying between 0.2 m (0.66 ft) and 16 m (52 ft). The state set up the JSC Chiaturmanganese company to manage and exploit the huge deposit.

The gross-balance of workable manganese ores of all commercial categories is estimated as 239 million tonnes, which include manganese oxide ores (41.6%), carbonate ores (39%), and peroxide ores (19%). In order to transport manganese ore to the ferro-alloy plant in Zestaponi the company developed a rail link which, operated today by Georgian Railways, is fully electrified. Manganese production rose to 60% of global output by 1905.

In Chiatura are located the Tsereteli State Theater, 10 schools, Faculty of the Georgian Technical University, and the Mghvimevi Monastery (10th-11th centuries). During the 1905 Russian Revolution Chiatura was the only Bolshevik stronghold in mostly Menshevik Georgia. 3,700 miners worked 18 hours a day sleeping in the mines, always covered in soot. They didn't even have baths. Joseph Stalin persuaded them to back Bolshevism during a debate with the Mensheviks. They preferred his simple 15-minute speech to his rivals' oratory. They called him "sergeant major Koba". He set up a printing press, protection racket and "red battle squads". Stalin put Vano Kiasashvili in charge of the armed miners. The mine owners actually sheltered him as he would protect them from thieves in return and he destroyed mines whose owners refused to pay up.

In 1906, a gold train carrying the miners' wages was attacked by Kote Tsintsadze's Druzhina (Bolshevik Expropriators' Club). They fought for two hours, killing a gendarme and a soldier and stealing 21,000 roubles. The miners went on a successful 55-day strike in June–July 1913. They demanded an 8-hour day, higher wages and no more night work. The police allowed the RSDRP to lead the strike provided that they did not make any political demands. They were supported by fellow strikers in Batumi and Poti.

In 2017, City of the Sun, a documentary film directed by Rati Oneli, follows a number of citizens of the city.

== Transportation ==
A section of the Zestaponi-Sachkhere railway lines passes through Chiatura, while internal city transport consists of buses and cable cars, connecting almost all districts of the city to the center. The city used to have trolleybus services, though these were discontinued in 2008/2009.

=== Cable cars ===
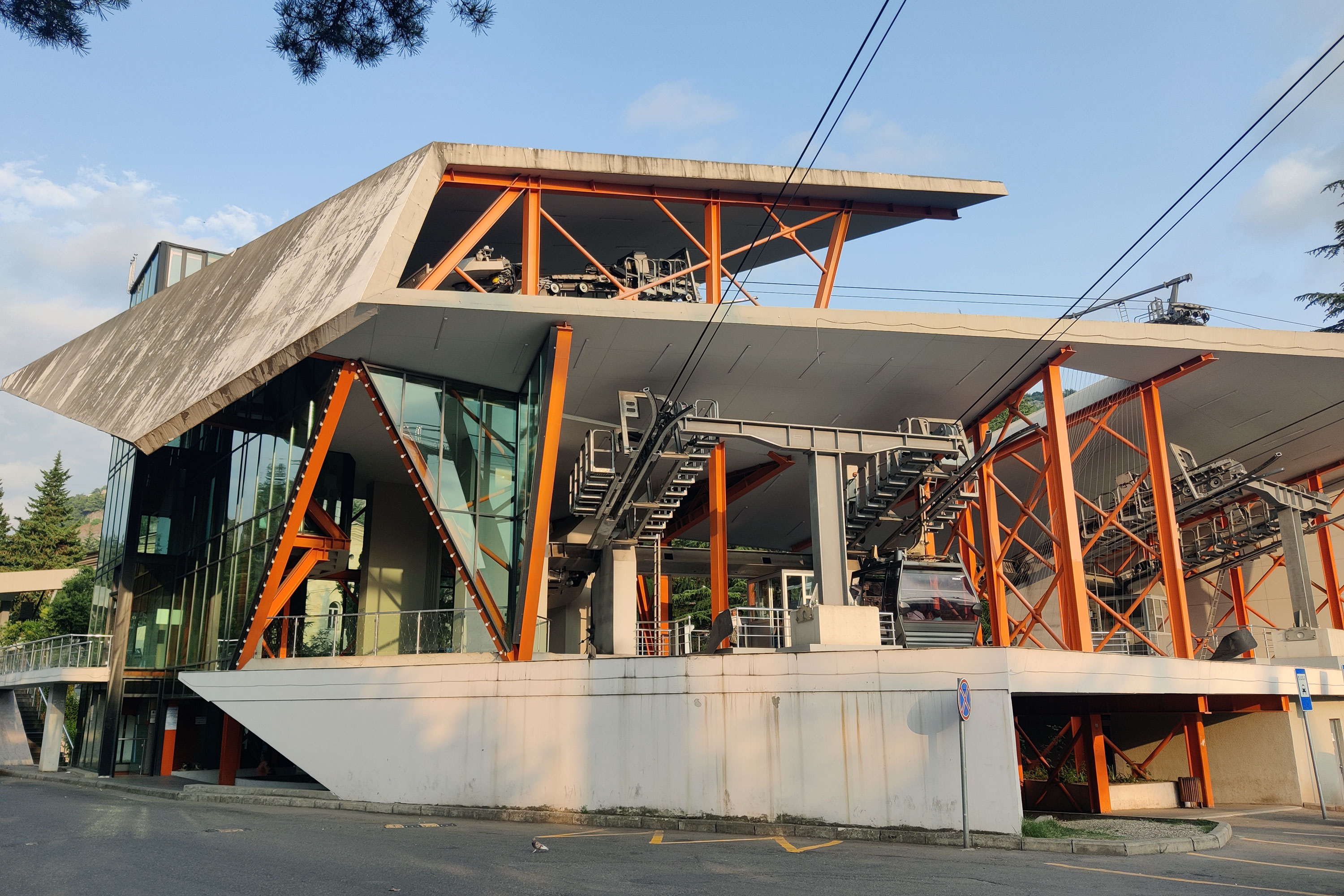
Newly built, central cable car station, connecting four lines

Due to the steep-sided river valley, production workers spent a large amount of time walking up from the town to the mines, thereby reducing productivity. In 1954 an extensive cable car system was installed to transport workers around the valley and up to the mines. The system's 17 lines continued to serve the city using original hardware until 2021.

In 2017, the Georgian government began rebuilding the system using modern cable car technology, beginning with the central four-line hub station. The revamped system opened in September 2021. The original Soviet-era system was deemed unsafe and taken out of service. The government plans to preserve its stations as heritage sites.

In early 2025, a fifth line opened —the renovated line to Sashevardno—and a sixth line (to Chiatura Cross) was under renovation.

== Twin towns – sister cities ==
Chiatura is twinned with:

- Birštonas, Lithuania
- Keila, Estonia
- Murgul, Turkey
- Sigulda, Latvia

== Notable people ==
- Grigol Abashidze (1914 – 1994), Georgian poet
- David Gamrekeli (1911 – 1977), baritone opera singer
- Vladimer Gaprindashvili (b. 1946), engineer
- Archil Gomiashvili (1926 – 2005), Soviet Georgian theatre and film actor
- Davit Kirkitadze (b. 1978), former parliamentarian

== See also ==
- Chiatura mine
