= Eristavi =

Title

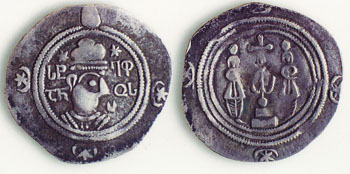
Silver coin minted by erismtavari Stephanoz I, 7th century.

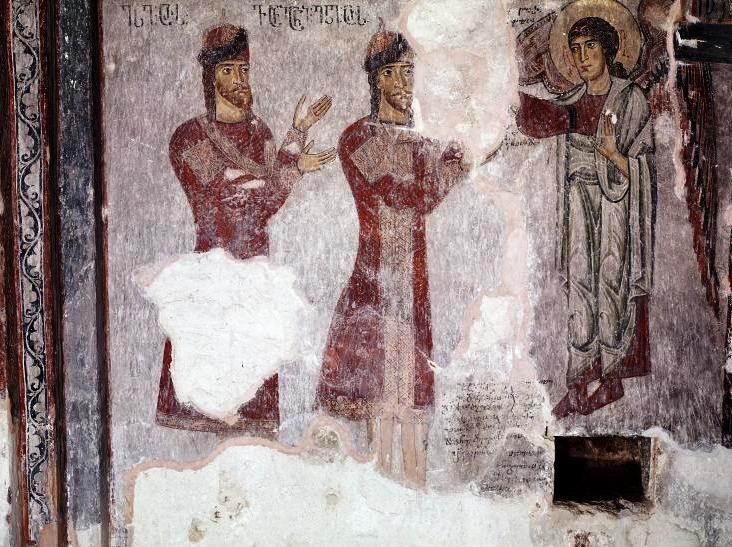
An 11th-century fresco from Racha depicting the eristavi Kvariani.

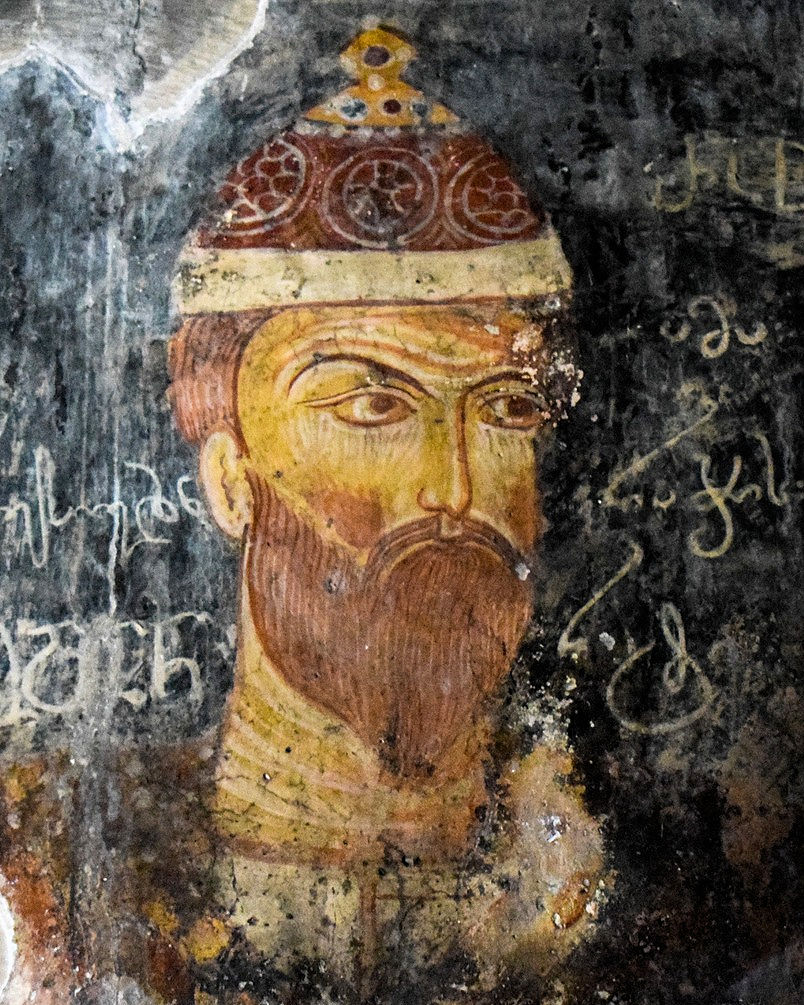
Rati, eristavi of Racha of the Kakhaberidze family, founder of the Mghvimevi monastery, 13th century.

Eristavi (Georgian: ერისთავი; literally, "head of the nation") was a Georgian feudal office, roughly equivalent to the Byzantine strategos and normally translated into English as "prince" or less commonly as "duke". In the Georgian aristocratic hierarchy, it was the title of the third rank of prince and governor of a large province. Holders of the title were ex-officio commanders of a military 'banner', wore a distinctive dress, ring, belt and spear and rode a particular breed of horse.

Some high-ranking eristavis were also titled as eristavt-eristavi (Georgian: ერისთავთ-ერისთავი), i.e. "duke of dukes" or archduke but it is improbable that the holder of the title had any subordinate eristavis. Erismtavari (Georgian: ერისმთავარი; literally, "chief of the people" or grand duke) was a similar title chiefly endowed upon the pre-Bagratid rulers of Iberia (Eastern Georgia) and later used interchangeably with the eristavi.

The title gave origin to the surname of four Georgian noble houses—Eristavi of Aragvi, Eristavi of Ksani, Eristavi of Racha, and Eristavi of Guria—confirmed in their princely ranks under the Russian rule in the 19th century. These families were often known simply as Princes Eristov in Russia but they did not have the same origin.

== See also ==
- List of Georgian dukes (eristavs)
- Eristoff, Vodka
- House of Sidamoni
