= Qvirila =

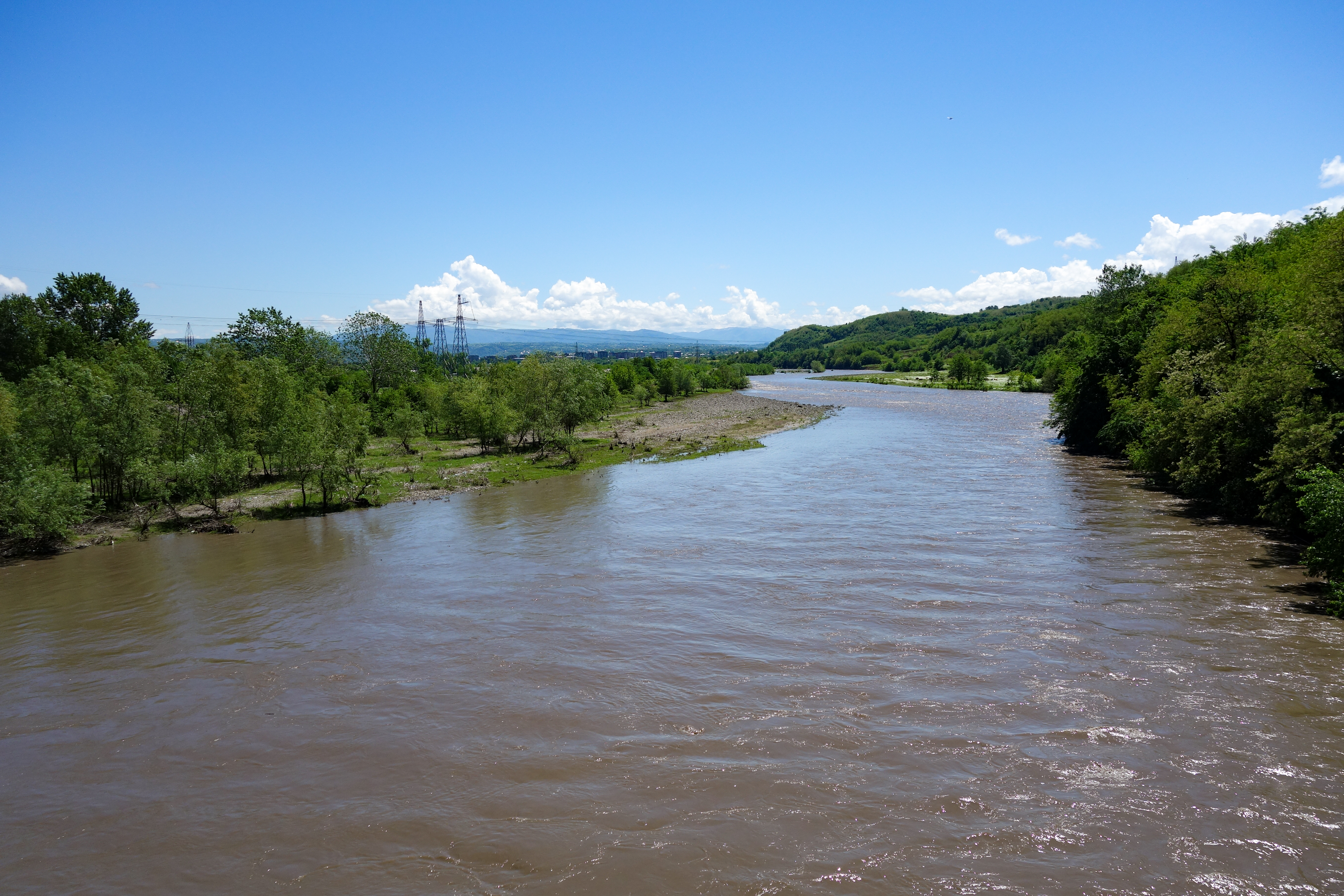
- The Qvirila near Zestaponi

- Qvirila Qvirila (Imereti)
- Native name: ყვირილა (Georgian)

Location
- Country: Georgia

Physical characteristics
- Mouth: Rioni
  - coordinates: 42°10′21″N 42°43′43″E
- Length: 140 km (87 mi)
- Basin size: 3,630 km^{2} (1,400 sq mi)

Basin features
- Progression: Rioni→ Black Sea
- Tributaries
  - right: Dzirula

The Qvirila (Georgian: ყვირილა [χʼviɾiɫä]) is a river of Georgia. It is 140 km (87 mi) long, and has a drainage basin of 3,630 km^{2} (1,400 sq mi). It is a left tributary of the Rioni, which it joins south of the city Kutaisi.

== Geographic information ==
It originates in South Ossetia, in the gorges of the mountains of the Racha Range. Most of the river is located in Georgia. After the confluence with its left tributary the Dzirula it flows through flat terrain, before going through the mountains. The river is fed mainly by rain. On average, water flow per year near the city Zestaponi, located 42 kilometers from its mouth, 61 m³ / s, at the mouth of about 90 m³ /from. The river is suitable for whitewater canoeing.

The Chiatura manganese ore deposit is located in the river basin.
