= Abbas I's Kakhetian and Kartlian campaigns =

Part of the Ottoman–Safavid War

Date	1614–1617
Location	Kartli, Tbilisi, Kakheti
Result	Safavid victory: Mass deportation and massacre of Georgians

Belligerents
Safavid Empire; Lesser Kabardia	Kingdom of Kakheti; Kingdom of Kartli; Supported by: Kingdom of Imereti; Principality of Mingrelia; Principality of Guria; Ottoman Empire; Ossetians

Commanders and leaders
Shah Abbas I; Ganj Ali Khan; Isa Khan Sheykhavand; Bektash Beg Torkman †; Pir Budaq Khan; Yusuf Khan; Giorgi Saakadze (Mūrāv-Beg); Bagrat VII; (Kingdom of Kakheti) Jesse (Isa Khan); (Kingdom of Kakheti) David Jandieri (until 1615); Mudar Alkhas	(Kingdom of Kakheti) Teimuraz I: Luarsab II (surrendered) (POW); (Kingdom of Kakheti) David Jandieri (after 1615)

Casualties and losses
Unknown	100,000 killed 130,000–160,000–200,000 deported

Abbas I’s Kakhetian and Kartlian campaigns (Georgian: აბას I-ის კახეთისა და ქართლის ლაშქრობები) refers to the four campaigns Safavid Shah Abbas I led between 1614 and 1617, in his East Georgian vassal kingdoms of Kartli and Kakheti during the Ottoman–Safavid War (1603–18). The campaigns were initiated as a response to the shown disobedience and subsequently staged rebellion by Abbas' formerly most loyal Georgian ghulams, namely Luarsab II of Kartli and Teimuraz I of Kakheti. After the complete devastation of Tbilisi, the quelling of the uprising, the massacre of up to 100,000 Georgians, and the deportation of between 130,000 and 200,000 more to mainland Iran, Kakheti, and Kartli were temporarily brought back under the Iranian sway.

== Background ==
In 1606, Abbas had appointed Luarsab II and Teimuraz I (also known as Tahmuras Khan) on the thrones of Safavid vassals Kartli and Kakheti, at the behest of Kartlian nobles and Teimuraz's mother Ketevan; both seemed like malleable youths. However, tensions between Georgia and the Shah rose in 1612 as Teimuraz and Luarsab executed pro-Iranian nobility including the governor of Karabakh. In 1613, when the Shah summoned them to join him on a hunting expedition in Mazandaran, they did not appear as they feared that they would be either imprisoned or killed. In the spring of 1614 war broke out. This event brought an end to the Treaty of Nasuh Pasha.

== Invasion ==
Iranian armies invaded the two territories in March 1614, and the two allied kings subsequently sought refuge in the Ottoman vassal Imeretia. Abbas, as reported by the Safavid court historian Iskander Beg Munshi, was infuriated by what was perceived as the defection of two of his most trusted subjects and gholams. He deported 30,000 Kakhetian peasants to Iran and appointed a grandson of Alexander II of Kakheti to the throne of Kakheti, Jesse of Kakheti (also known as "Isā Khān"). Raised up at the court in Isfahan and a Muslim, he was perceived as fully loyal to the Shah.

Abbas threatened Imeretia with devastation if they did not give up the fugitive kings; the Imeretian, Mingrelian, and Gurian rulers jointly refused his demand. Luarsab, however, surrendered voluntarily to the Shah; Abbas initially treated him well but when he learned that Luarsab and Teimuraz had offered an alliance with the Ottomans he demanded that Luarsab accept Islam. When Luarsab refused, he was thrown in prison.

Teimuraz returned to eastern Georgia in 1615, taking advantage of a resurgence in Ottoman-Safavid hostilities, and there he defeated a Safavid force. However, when the Ottoman army postponed its invasion of the Safavids, Abbas was able to briefly send an army back to defeat Teimuraz, and redoubled his invasion after brokering a truce with the Ottomans. The Safavid soldiers met heavy resistance by the citizens of Tbilisi, but Iranian rule was fully restored over eastern Georgia.

In 1615, the elderly Lesser Kabardian prince Mudar Alkhas, who had strong family ties with the Shah of Iran and the Shamkhal of Tarki, unexpectedly invaded the Darial Gorge, occupying the whole region. His troops advanced into Georgia, thereby opening the way forghe Shah's troop to enter deeper into the Caucasus.

== Massacres and deportations ==
In a punitive expedition to Kakheti, Abbas's army then killed perhaps 60-70,000 or 100,000 Georgians, with twice as many more being deported to Iran, removing about two-thirds of the Kakhetian population. More refugees were rounded up in 1617. In 1619 Abbas appointed the loyal Simon II (or Semayun Khan) as a puppet ruler of Kartli, while placing a series of his own governors to rule over districts where the rebellious inhabitants were mostly located.

These deportations marked another stage in the Safavid policy of forcibly resettling huge amounts of Georgians and other ethnic Caucasian groups such as the Circassians and Armenians, to mainland Persia.

== Aftermath ==
Abbas obtained control over eastern Georgia for a time; however the aggrieved Giorgi Saakadze and King Teimuraz led new rebellions in 1625 and 1626 which were more effective at reducing Safavid control of the region.

== See also ==
- Treaty of Nasuh Pasha
- Treaty of Serav
- Kakhetian Uprising (1659)

== Sources ==
- Blow, David (2009). Shah Abbas: The Ruthless King Who became an Iranian Legend. London, UK: I. B. Tauris & Co. Ltd. ISBN 978-1-84511-989-8. LCCN 2009464064.
- Kacharava, Eka (2011). "Alaverdy Eparchy" (PDF). Friends of Academic Research in Georgia. Archived (PDF) from the original on 18 May 2015.
- Khanbaghi, Aptin (2006). The Fire, the Star and the Cross: Minority Religions in Medieval and Early Modern Iran. London, UK: I. B. Tauris. ISBN 1-8451-1056-0. LCCN 2006296797.
- Matthee, Rudi (2011). Persia in Crisis: Safavid Decline and the Fall of Isfahan. I.B.Tauris. pp. 1–371. ISBN 978-0857731814.
- Mikaberidze, Alexander (2015). Historical Dictionary of Georgia (e ed.). Rowman & Littlefield. ISBN 978-1442241466.
- Mitchell, Colin P., ed. (2011). New Perspectives on Safavid Iran: Empire and Society. Milton Park, UK: Routledge. ISBN 978-0-4157-7462-8. LCCN 2010032352.
- Monshi, Eskandar Beg (1978). Tārīk̲-e ʻālamārā-ye ʻAbbāsī [The History of Shah 'Abbas the Great]. Persian Heritage (in Arabic and English). Translated by Savory, Roger M. Boulder, CO: Westview Press. ISBN 0-8915-8296-7. LCCN 78020663.
- Parizi, Mohammad-Ebrahim Bastani (2000). "GANJ-ʿALĪ KHAN". Encyclopaedia Iranica, Vol. X, Fasc. 3. pp. 284–285.
- Roemer, H.R. (1986). "The Safavid period". The Cambridge History of Iran, Volume 5: The Timurid and Safavid periods. Cambridge: Cambridge University Press. pp. 189–351. ISBN 9780521200943.
- Savory, Roger M. (1980). Iran under the Safavids. Cambridge, UK: Cambridge University Press. ISBN 0-521-22483-7. LCCN 78073817.
