= Prince Heraclius of Kakheti =

Heraclius

Governor (Sanjak-bey) of Shaki
- Tenure: 1578
- Died: 1589; Istanbul, Ottoman Empire
- Spouse: Circassian princess
- Dynasty: Bagrationi
- Father: Alexander II of Kakheti
- Mother: Tinatin Amilakhvari

Heraclius (Georgian: ერეკლე; died 1589) was a Georgian prince (batonishvili) of the royal house of Kakheti, son of King Alexander II of Kakheti by his wife Tinatin Amilakhvari.

== Biography ==
According to the 18th-century Georgian historian Vakhushti of Kartli, Heraclius, soon after Alexader's accession to the throne of Kakheti, took offence at his brother David and clandestinely repaired for the Ottoman court in Constantinople. The Safavid Iranian shah Tahmasp I saw this as a renege on the Kakhetians' pledge of loyalty. Advancing with his army into Karabakh, the shah summoned Alexander to his camp. Through the machinations of Prince Cholokashvili, the Kakhetians managed to divert the shah's attention to the political intrigues in the principality of Samtskhe, which was invaded and ravaged by the Iranians in 1574.

In 1578, when Lala Mustafa Pasha's Ottoman army marched into Georgia, Alexander II of Kakheti accepted the sultan's suzerainty and helped Lala Pasha to conquer Shirvan. Alexander's son Heraclius was briefly appointed by the Ottomans a governor of sanjak of Shaki in Shirvan, which had hitherto been ruled by Alexander's alienated brother Isa-Khan on the shah of Iran's behalf. Erekle reappears in the historical records as a signatory, together with his father Alexander II and brothers, David and George, to the oath of allegiance to Feodor I of Russia on 28 September 1587, a culmination of the mission of the Russian envoy Rodion Birkin, which, however, did not bring about any tangible changes in the regional political climate.

== Ancestry ==
Ancestors of Prince Heraclius of Kakheti

16. Alexander I of Kakheti
8. George II of Kakheti
17. Ana Irubakidze-Cholokashvili
4. Levan of Kakheti
9. Helene Irubakidze-Cholokashvili
2. Alexander II of Kakheti
20. Giorgi I Gurieli
10. Mamia I Gurieli
5. Tinatin Gurieli
1. Erekle
24. Mamisa Amilakhvari
12. Taqa Amilakhvari
25. Gulkan N.
6. Bardzim Amilakhvari
26. Zaza Panaskerteli-Tsitsishvili
13. Olympia Panaskerteli-Tsitsishvili
3. Tinatin Amilakhvari
