= Bektash Beg Torkman =

Safavid military leader

Bektash Beg Torkman, also commonly referred to as Bektash of Kakheti (died 1615), was a Safavid military leader, who was the first member of the Qizilbash to govern Kakheti.

== Biography ==
Bektash's father was an influential Qizilbash commander named Mohammad Khan Torkman, while his mother was a daughter of king Alexander II of Kakheti. As Alexander II was the father of Constantine, and Constantine himself was married to a sister of Bektash, Bektash and Constantine were brother-in-laws as well as cousins at the same time. According to Professor Hirotake Maeda, this was part of king Abbas I (r. 1588–1629) intentions to make the Bagrationis and Qizilbash leaders related to each other by blood, and to incorporate them into Safavid elite society. A member of the "Torkman tribe", who traditionally held the governorship of Tabriz, Bektash was sent to Kakheti by Abbas I together with Prince Constantine and fellow Torkman tribesmen in 1604-1605.

In the ensuing period in Kakheti, Constatine killed his own father Alexander II and Prince Giorgi and controlled Kakheti for a period, but the Georgians soon revolted and Constantine was killed as a result. Ten years later, when the shah himself led a punitive expedition to Georgia by which Safavid Iranian rule over eastern Georgia (Kartli, Kakheti) would be decisively cemented, Bektash was officially appointed as the first Qizilbash governor of Kakheti.

In 1615, during the revolt in Georgia against the Safavid rule, Bektash was killed.

== Sources ==
- Floor, Willem; Herzig, Edmund, eds. (2012). Iran and the World in the Safavid Age. I.B.Tauris. ISBN 978-1850439301.
