= Prince George of Kakheti =

Prince George of Kakheti may refer to:

- Prince George of Kakheti (died 1561), son of Levan of Kakheti
- Prince George of Kakheti (died 1605), son of Alexander II of Kakheti
- Prince George of Kakheti (died 1650/51), son of Prince David of Kakheti
- Prince George of Kakheti (fl. 1696–1698), son of Heraclius I of Kakheti
