= Jesse of Kakheti =

Ruler of Kakheti, Georgia (died 1615)

Jesse (Georgian: იესე) or Isā Khān (Persian: عیسی خان, romanized: ʿIsā Khān; Georgian: ისა-ხანი), of the Bagrationi dynasty, was a Safavid-appointed ruler of Kakheti in eastern Georgia from 1614 to 1615.

== Biography ==
Jesse was a son of Crown Prince George, himself a son of King Alexander II of Kakheti, by his first wife, a daughter of Adi Korklu Bey I, Sultan of Elisu. Held as a political hostage by Abbas I of Persia, he was converted to Islam and brought up at the shah’s court in Isfahan. In 1614, when Abbas I's armies overrun Kakheti, the king Teimuraz I had to flee to western Georgia (Kingdom of Imereti). Abbas appointed his loyal vassal, Isā Khān, as a governor of the region, but he failed to gain a foothold there.
