= Papuna Amilakhvari =

Papuna Amilakhvari (Georgian: პაპუნა ამილახვარი; died 1625), was a political and military figure of the Kingdom of Kartli in the first quarter of the 17th century. He was the head of the Amilakhvari family, commander of the Zemo Kartli banner (sadrosho), and governor (mouravi) of Gori.

== Biography ==
In October 1605, by order of King George X of Kartli, Papuna Amilakhvari assisted Queen Ketevan in her struggle against the usurper Constantine I of Kakheti. Papuna Amilakhvari was later deprived of his office by Bagrat VII. In 1614, Shah Abbas I granted the office of Amilakhvari to Anduqapar Amilakhvari. During the Battle of Martkopi, Papuna Amilakhvari supported the rebellious Georgians and had Anduqapar arrested. Papuna Amilakhvari was later put to death at the instigation of Anduqapar by Jesse, Duke of Ksani.

== Family ==
Papuna Amilakhvari was married to Tamar, daughter of Prince Vakhtang, son of King Luarsab I. Their children were:

- Iotam (died 1649);
- Paata (fl. 1642);
- Bezhan (fl. 1619–1656);
- Givi (fl. 1619–1656).
