= Zagem =

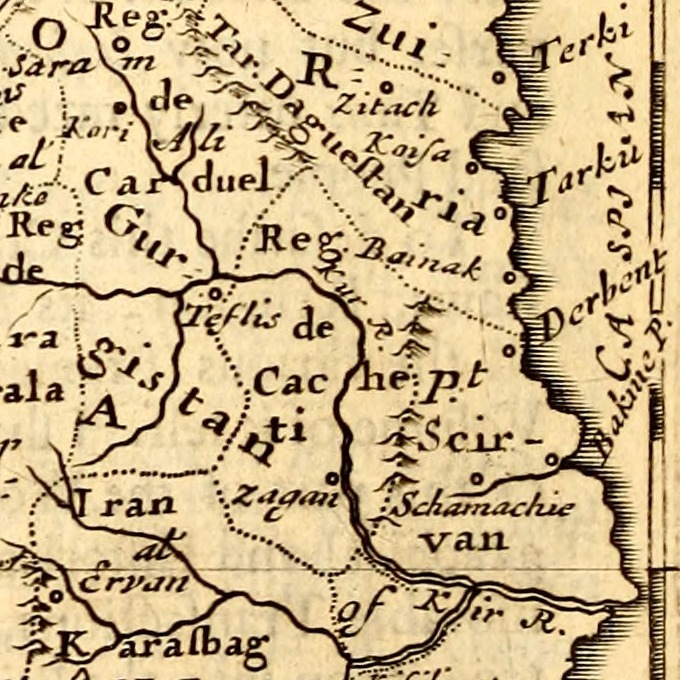
A portion of the 1693 map by Robert Morden showing the Kingdom of Kakheti (Reg. de Cachet) with the town of Zagem (Zagan).

Zagem or Bazari (Georgian: ბაზარი) was a town in the southeast Caucasus, in the eastern Georgian kingdom of Kakheti. It flourished from the 15th to the 17th century as a vibrant commercial and artisanal centre. In the 1550s, it became a dependency of the Karabakh–Ganja province of Safavid Iran. The fortunes of the town were reversed by Safavid military actions in the area in 1615. By the 1720s, the town had been reduced to an insignificant hamlet. The settlement was located in what is now the Zaqatala District of Azerbaijan, but no evidence of the town remains at the site. The toponym Zagem is found exclusively in non-Georgian sources; Georgians knew it as Bazari, meaning "bazaar".

== Etymology and location ==
Called Bazari ("bazaar") in the Georgian sources, the town was variously known to the Persian authors as Zagam, Zagham, or Zakam, and to the European accounts as Zagem, Zagen, Zagain, Zegharn, or Seggen. The non-Georgian forms are probably related to the toponym tsagam (цагъам), meaning "a blackberry bush" in Lezgian, a language of the neighboring mountainous tribe. The town lay in the river plain of Alazani (Qanıx), on the left bank of that river, in the present-day Republic of Azerbaijan, where a homonymous village is still found some 25 km south of the city of Zaqatala, close to the border with Georgia.

== History ==
=== Early history ===
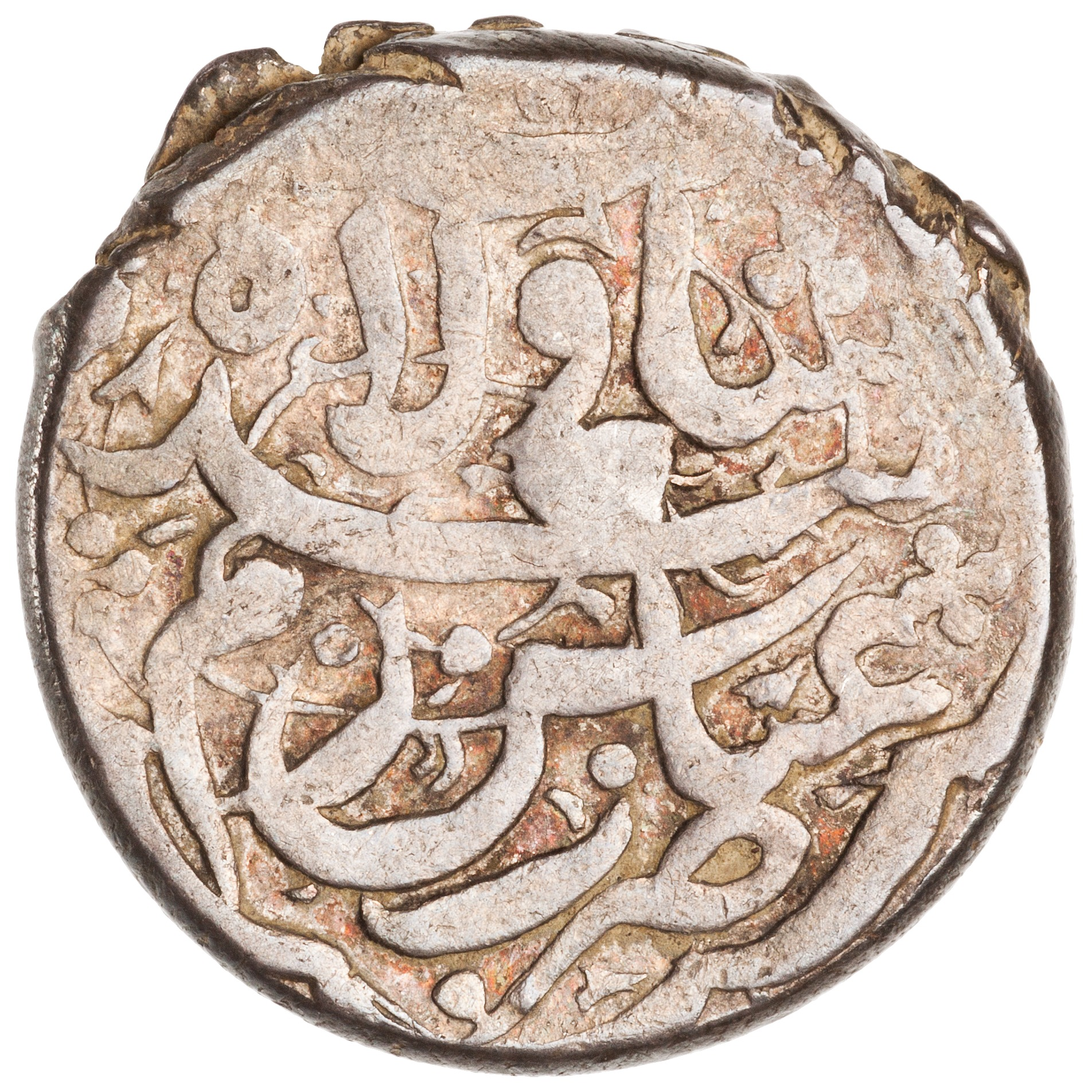
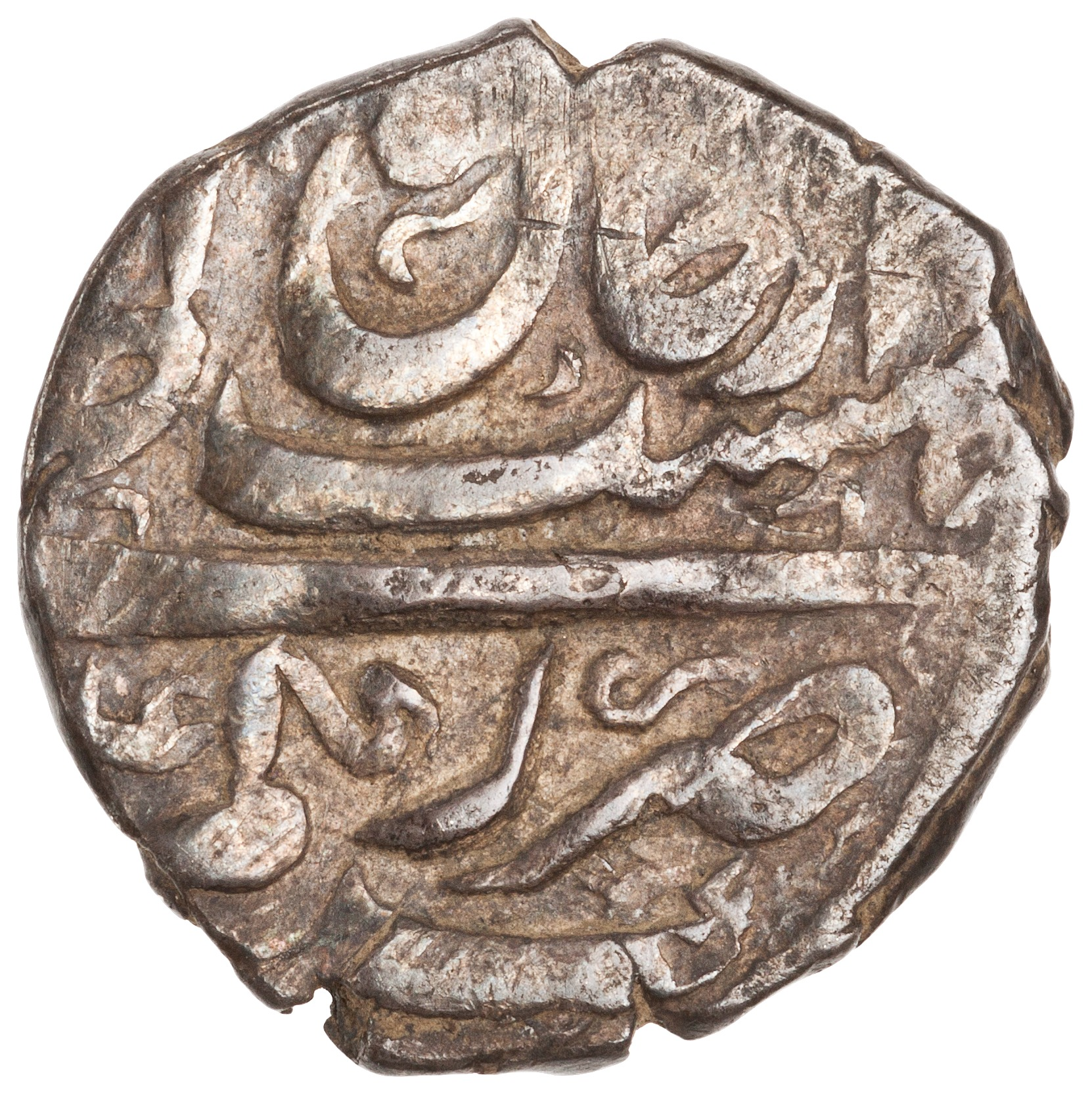
Two Safavid coins minted in Zagam. Left: Coin of Shah Abbas the Great (Abbas I) (r. 1588–1629).
Right: Coin of Shah Safi (r. 1629–1642).

The town named Bazari is first documented in Georgian sources in 1392. Owing to its location on a road from Gremi in Kakheti to the neighboring country of Shirvan and proximity to major regional trade routes, as well as due to relative peace and stability achieved by the Bagratid kings of Kakheti, the town of Bazari/Zagem became an important regional commercial and crafts centre, settled by the Georgian, Jewish, Armenian, and Muslim communities. In the 16th century, it emerged as the economic capital of Kakheti and home to a royal residence. Not infrequently, for the contemporary Persian and Turkish sources, "the ruler of Zagam" was a synonym to the king of Kakheti. In the 1550s, the Safavid military leader and official Qalich Beg, son of Oveys Beg Pazuki, assumed the governorship over the town, and ruled for nine years.

Zagem's notability as an economic hub is further emphasized by the existence in the town of a mint, which issued silver coins (abbasi) in the name of Safavid shahs and became known to modern scholars with the discovery, in 1967, of two such coins in Birkiani in northeastern Georgia. In total, about 80 coins produced by the Zagem mint have been found throughout the South Caucasus, dating from 963 AH (1555/1556 CE) to 1056 AH (1646/1647 CE) or 1066 AH (1655/1656 CE).

=== Vicissitudes ===
On 7 October 1604, the vicinity of Zagem was the arena of a battle between the Kakhetian and the Turkish-Kumyk armies. The Kakhetian crown-prince George employed 40 musketeers from the retinue of the Russian ambassadors Mikhail Tatishchev and Andrei Ivanov and led his 5,000-strong force to defeat the Turks and force the Kumyks under Sultan-Mut into flight. On 12 March 1605, the same Russian diplomats witnessed in Zagem a royal parricide in which Prince Constantine, apparently at the order of Shah Abbas I of Persia, killed his reigning father Alexander II and elder brother Crown Prince George, the last year's victor over the Turks, and had their entourage massacred.

=== Sack of Zagem ===
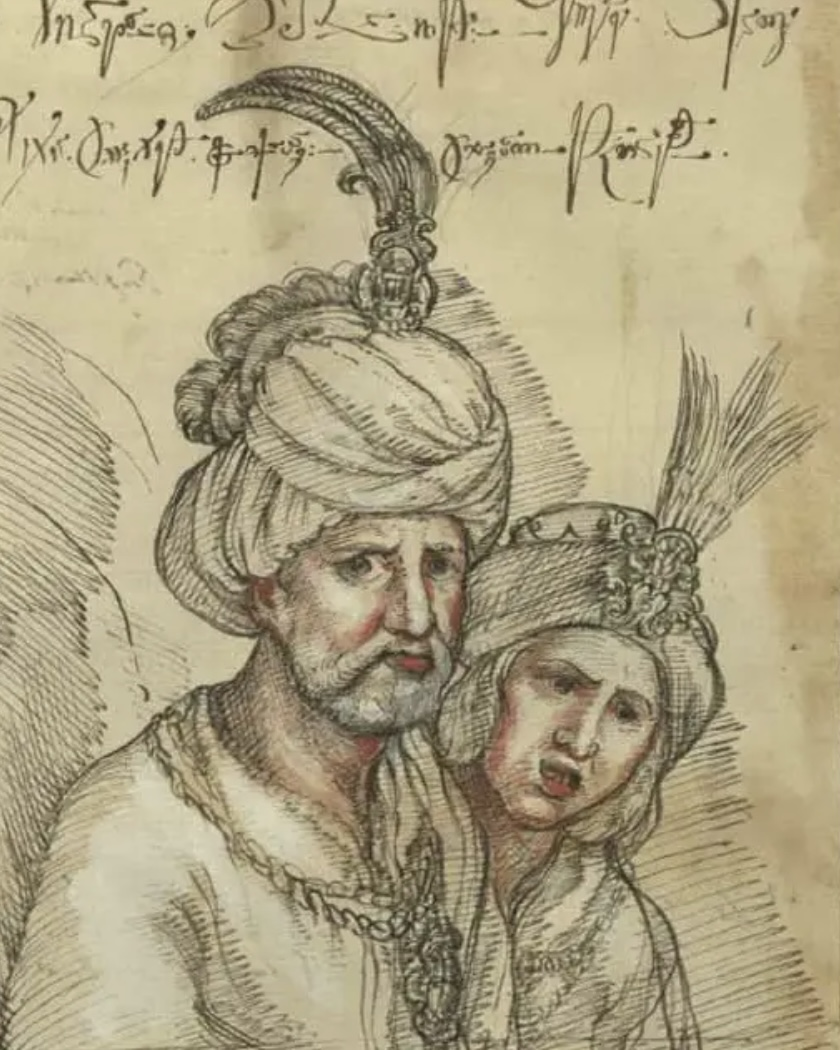
King Teimuraz I of Kakheti as depicted by the Italian missionary Teramo Castelli. Under Teimuraz's rule, Kakheti was invaded by Shah Abbas I of Persia and Zagem was sacked in 1615.

Beginning in March 1614, Shah Abbas I undertook a systematic military campaign with the aim to bring Kakheti more firmly into the Safavid empire. To this end, the shah conducted a reorganization of the occupied Kakhetian territory which modified its ethnic and demographic structure. The Kakhetians revolted in 1615 and Shah Abbas returned with his army to deal with the rebels. His commander-in-chief in Shirvan, Yusuf-Khan, advanced with a Qizilbash force consisting of the Ustajlu, Baylat, and Pazuki tribes from the east through Shakki and laid waste to Zagem. The story of the town's destruction is described by the Safavid-era historians Iskandar Beg Munshi and Fazli Isfahani Khuzani. The latter, a Persian official responsible for the task of counting booty after the sack of Zagem, recorded 700 Jewish and Georgian captives, 2,000 severed heads, and 30,000 tumans excluding the booties hidden by the troops. Fazli then went on to report the success to Shah Abbas, who was headquartered near Ganja. Shah Abbas renounced his right over one-fifth of booty, only taking 3 boys and 2 girls. According to the Russian church historian Sergey Belokurov (1891), among the treasures of Zagem looted by the Persians was the chiton of Jesus, which was, in March 1625, presented by the shah's envoys to the Russian tsar Michael I in Moscow.

The surviving population of Zagem—Christians, Muslims, and Jews—was then deported to Persia's interior and mostly resettled to the localities in Mazandaran such as Farrokhabad to help develop the area. A Jewish deportee, Khoja Lale Zar ebn Ya'qub, played an important role in silk trade in the Safavid empire. The vacated lands of Zagem were occupied by the Turkic Qizilbash nomads headed by Bektash Beg Torkman, himself a son of a Qizilbash chieftain and a Georgian princess.

Zagem was never able to recover from the blow dealt in 1616. King Teimuraz I of Kakheti was able to return to the town for a couple of times. It saw a modest revival in the 1630s and early 1640s, but then went in decline and fell under the rule of Safavid regional governors. According to Muhammad Ibrahim b. Zayn al-'Abidin Nasiri's chronicle (c. 1730), by the end of the Safavid period the governor of Zagam was the governor of the Shams al-Dinlu tribe. With the 1722 demise of the Safavid empire and the ensuing chaos at its Caucasian periphery, Zagem lost all vestiges of its past importance as a commercial outpost and faded away.

== Sources ==
- Allen, William Edward David (1970). Russian embassies to the Georgian kings (1589–1605), Vol. II. Cambridge University Press. ISBN 052101029-2.
- Beradze, Grigory G; Smirnova, Lidiya P (1988). Материалы по истории ирано-грузинских взаимоотношений в начале XVII века [Materials for the history of Iranian–Georgian relations in the beginning of the 17th century] (in Russian). Tbilisi: Metsniereba. ISBN 5-520-00126-X.
- Dundua, G; et al. (2013). "Coins of the Georgian kings and princes in the 15th-16th cc". Online English-Georgian Catalogue of Georgian Numismatics. Tbilisi State University.
- Esbroeck, Michel van (1993). "Invention des reliques comme attribut impérial: la tunique du Christ à Moscou et son symbolisme" [Acquisition of relics as imperial symbol: the Chiton of Christ in Moscow and its symbolism]. In Catalano, Pierangelo (ed.). Roma fuori di Roma: istituzioni e immagini [Rome outside Rome: Institutions and Images] (in French and Italian). Rome: Sapienza University of Rome. pp. 225–243.
- Floor, Willem M. (2008). Titles and Emoluments in Safavid Iran: A Third Manual of Safavid Administration, by Mirza Naqi Nasiri. Washington, DC: Mage Publishers. ISBN 978-193382323-2.
- Gvasalia, Jondo (1977). ბაზარი [Bazari]. ქართული საბჭოთა ენციკლოპედია, ტ. 2 [Georgian Soviet Encyclopedia, Vol. 2] (in Georgian). Tbilisi.
- Maeda, Hirotake (2006). "The forced migrations and reorganisation of the regional order in the Caucasus by Safavid Iran: Preconditions and developments described by Fazli Khuzani". In Ieda, Osamu; Uyama, Tomohiko (eds.). Reconstruction and interaction of Slavic Eurasia and its neighbouring worlds (PDF). Slavic Eurasian Studies, No.10. Sapporo: Slavic Research Centre, Hokkaido University. ISBN 493863739-1.
- Maeda, Hirotake (2012). "Exploitation of the Frontier: The Caucasus Policy of Shah 'Abbas I". In Floor, Willem; Herzig, Edmund (eds.). Iran and the World in the Safavid Age. London: I.B.Tauris. ISBN 978-185043930-1.
- Minorsky, Vladimir (1980). Tadhkirat al-Muluk: A Manual of Safavid Administration (2nd ed.). London: Gibb Memorial Trust. ISBN 978-0-906094-12-9.
- Paghava, Irakli (2013). სეფიანებთან საქართველოს ურთიერთობის ისტორიიდან – კახეთის ქალაქი ბაზარი (ზაგემი) XVII-XVIII საუკუნეებში [On the Safavid-Georgian Relations: City Of Bazari (Zagemi) in Kakheti in the 17th-18th cc. (According to Numismatic and Written Data)]. In Sanikidze, George (ed.). ახლო აღმოსავლეთი და საქართველო VI [The Near East and Georgia, Vol. 7] (PDF) (in Georgian and English). Tbilisi: Ilia State University Press. pp. 218–226. ISBN 978-9941-18-197-9.
- Suny, Ronald Grigor (1994). The Making of the Georgian Nation (2nd ed.). Bloomington: Indiana University Press. ISBN 025320915-3.
