= Jandieri =

Georgian noble family

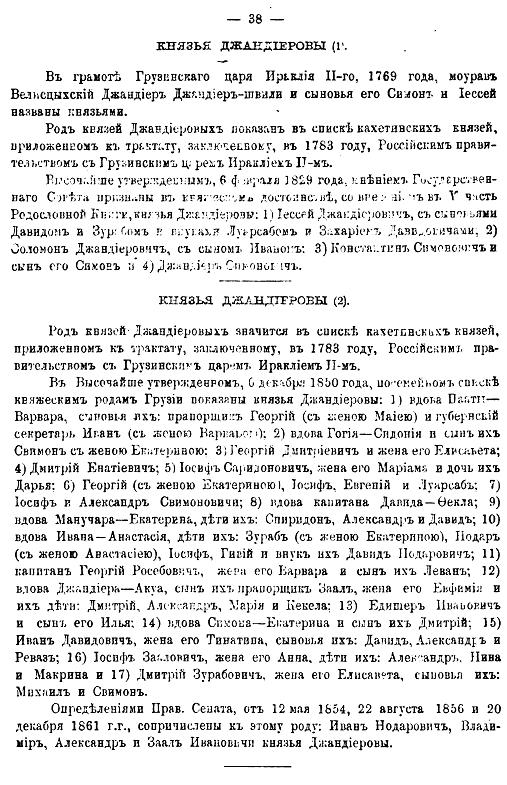
Princes Jandierov in the Georgian nobility book from 1892

The House of Jandieri (Georgian: ჯანდიერი) was a Georgian noble family of Georgian noble origin, known from the seventeenth century as grandees in the Kingdom of Kakheti.

== History ==
According to the genealogical treatise by Prince Ioane of Georgia (1768–1830), the family was elevated, in 1628, to the princely rank by the king Teimuraz I of Kakheti. After the Russian annexation of Georgia, the family was recognized by the Imperial order as princes Jandierov or Jandieri Джандиери) in 1829.

One of the members of the Jandieri family, Joseph, served as the Catholicos of Georgia from 1755 to 1764, and has been canonized by the Georgian Orthodox Church.
