= Constantine I of Kakheti =

King of Kakheti

Constantine I

King of Kakheti
- Reign: March 1605 – October 1605
- Predecessor: Alexander II
- Successor: Teimuraz I
- Born: 1566; Kingdom of Kakheti
- Died: 22 October 1605 (aged 38–39)
- Spouse: Unnamed daughter of Mohammad Khan Torkman
- Dynasty: Bagrationi
- Father: Alexander II of Kakheti
- Mother: Tinatin Amilakhvari
- Religion: Shia Islam (formerly Georgian Orthodox Church)

Constantine I (Georgian: კონსტანტინე I), also known as Constantine Khan (Persian: کنستانتین خان; კონსტანტინე ხანი), Constantin(e) Mirza, or Konstandil / Kustandil Mirza (1566 – 22 October 1605), of the Bagrationi dynasty, was a king (mepe) of Kakheti in eastern Georgia from March to October 1605.

== Biography ==
A son of King Alexander II of Kakheti by his wife, Princess Tinatin Amilakhvari, Constantine was taken in his childhood to Persia where he was converted to Islam, brought up at the court, and lived for many years. When envoys from his father Alexander II, Simon I of Kartli, and Manuchir II of Samtskhe arrived at the Safavid court between 1596 and 1597 with many gifts, including slave boys and girls, Constantine entertained them. He served as a darugha (prefect) of the royal city of Qazvin and then of Isfahan (1602–1603). In 1604, Shah Abbas I of Persia appointed him as the governor and commander of Shirvan to fight the Ottoman forces there, and ordered him to secure the Kakhetian participation in the campaign. As Alexander II was reluctant to engage in this conflict, Constantine, accompanied by a sizable Persian entourage, arrived in Kakheti, being honorably met by his father and elder brother George at a camp near the town of Zagem (Bazari).

On 12 March 1605, during the negotiations, Constantine murdered Alexander and George, and declared himself King of Kakheti. However, his subjects refused to recognize a patricide and revolted. The rebellion was led by Ketevan, widow of Constantine's brother David I, who requested aid from his relative George X, King of Kartli. Constantine succeeded in bribing some of the rebel nobles, and, on the shah's order, led a combined Kakhetian-Qizilbash army against Shirvan. During the protracted siege of Shemakha, the Kakhetian auxiliaries revolted and made Constantine flee. The rebels sent emissaries to Shah Abbas and pledged loyalty provided that Abbas confirmed their candidate, Ketevan's son Teimuraz, as a Christian king of Kakheti. Meanwhile, the Kartlian forces under Prince Papuna Amilakhvari intervened and inflicted a decisive defeat on Constantine's army on 22 October 1605. Constantine was killed in battle, and Abbas was forced to acknowledge Teimuraz as a king.

== Marriage ==
According to the recently discovered chronicle by Fazli Isfahani Khuzani, a contemporary Persian official and historian, Constantine married, c. 1604, his own niece, a daughter of Mohammed Khan, an influential Qizilbash chieftain, who was married to a daughter of Alexander II. Mohammed Khan's son, Bektash (who was therefore Constantine's brother-in-law and cousin at the same time), accompanied Constantine to Kakheti and later became the province's ruler until being overthrown in a rebellion led by Davit Jandieri in 1615.

== See also ==
- Iranian Georgians

== Ancestry ==
Ancestors of Constantine I of Kakheti

16. Alexander I of Kakheti
8. George II of Kakheti
17. Ana Irubakidze-Cholokashvili
4. Levan of Kakheti
9. Helene Irubakidze-Cholokashvili
2. Alexander II of Kakheti
20. Giorgi I Gurieli
10. Mamia I Gurieli
5. Tinatin Gurieli
1. Constantine I
24. Mamisa Amilakhvari
12. Taqa Amilakhvari
25. Gulkan N.
6. Bardzim Amilakhvari
26. Zaza Panaskerteli-Tsitsishvili
13. Olympia Panaskerteli-Tsitsishvili
3. Tinatin Amilakhvari

== Sources ==
- Floor, Willem M. (2008). Titles and Emoluments in Safavid Iran: A Third Manual of Safavid Administration, by Mirza Naqi Nasiri. Washington, DC: Mage Publishers. p. 286. ISBN 978-1933823232.
- Floor, Willem; Herzig, Edmund, eds. (2012). Iran and the World in the Safavid Age. I.B.Tauris. p. 502. ISBN 978-1850439301.
- Matthee, Rudi (2001). "GEORGIA vii. Georgians in the Safavid Administration". Encyclopaedia Iranica, Vol. X, Fasc. 5. pp. 493–496.
- Matthee, Rudi (2012). Persia in Crisis: Safavid Decline and the Fall of Isfahan. I.B.Tauris. p. 146. ISBN 978-1-84511-745-0.
- Allen, W. E. D. (1970). Russian Embassies to the Georgian Kings, 1589–1605: Volumes I and II. Taylor & Francis. ISBN 978-1-317-06040-6.

| Preceded by Ottoman Governors | Governor of Shirvan; 1604–05 | Succeeded by Zu'l Fiqar Qaramanlu |
| Preceded by Alexander II | King of Kakheti; 1605 | Succeeded by Teimuraz I |
