= Teimuraz I =

17th-century King of Kakheti

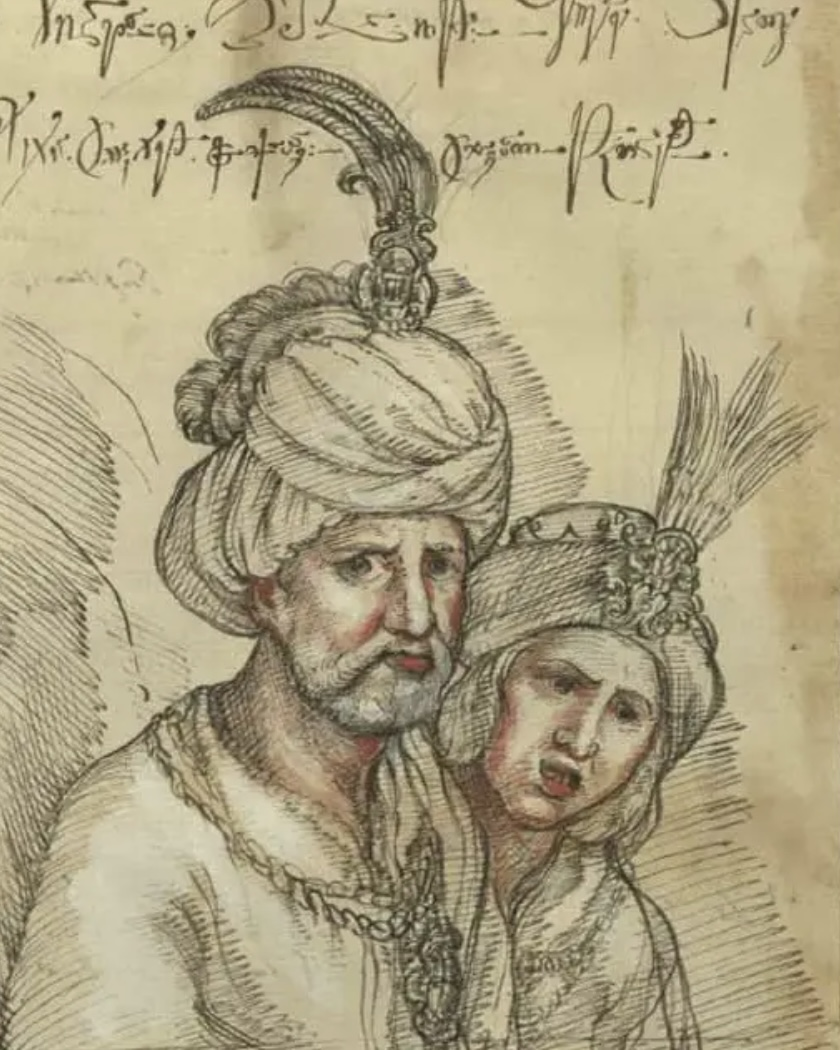
- Teimuraz I and his wife Khoreshan. A sketch from the album of the contemporaneous Roman Catholic missionary Cristoforo Castelli

King of Kakheti
- Reign: 1606–1614; 1615–1616; 1625–1633; 1634–1648
- Predecessor: Constantine I
- Successor: Interregnum

King of Kartli
- Reign: 1625–1633
- Predecessor: Simon II
- Successor: Rostom
- Rival king: Simon II (1625–1631)
- Born: 1589
- Died: 1663 (aged 73–74); Gorgan, Iran
- Burial: Alaverdi Monastery
- Spouse: Ana Gurieli (m. 1607; died 1610) Khoreshan of Kartli (m. 1612; died 1659)
- Issue: Prince Levan; Prince Alexander; Prince David; Princess Darejan; Princess Tinatin
- Dynasty: Bagrationi
- Father: David I of Kakheti
- Mother: Ketevan the Martyr
- Religion: Georgian Orthodox Church
- Khelrtva

Teimuraz I (Georgian: თეიმურაზ I; 1589–1663), of the Bagrationi dynasty, was a Georgian monarch (mepe) who ruled, with intermissions, as King of Kakheti from 1606 to 1648 and also of Kartli from 1625 to 1633. The eldest son of David I and Ketevan, he was made king of Kakheti following a revolt against his reigning uncle, Constantine I. From 1614 on, he waged a five-decade long struggle against the Safavid Iranian domination of Georgia in the course of which he lost several members of his family and ended his life as the Shah's prisoner at Astarabad at the age of 74.

A versatile poet and admirer of Persian poetry, Teimuraz translated into Georgian several Persian love-stories and transformed the personal experiences of his long and difficult reign into a series of original poems influenced by the contemporary Persian tradition.

== Early life ==
Teimuraz was the son of David I of Kakheti by his wife Ketevan (née Bagrationi-Mukhraneli). Kakheti, the easternmost Georgian polity that emerged after the fragmentation of the Kingdom of Georgia in the late 15th century, was within the sphere of influence of the Safavid dynasty of Iran. Until the early years of the 17th century, the kings of Kakheti had maintained peaceful relations with their Iranian suzerains, but their independent foreign policy and diplomacy with the Tsardom of Russia had long irked the shahs of Iran.

He returned home in 1606, after Christian Kakhetians, rallied by Teimuraz's mother Ketevan, revolted and overthrew their Muslim king, Constantine I, who had killed his own father, King Alexander II of Kakheti, in an Iranian-sponsored coup. The nobles of Kakheti requested that Shah Abbas I confirmed Teimuraz, who was Alexander II's grandson, on the throne. Abbas, frustrated by the rebellion and preoccupied with his new war with the Ottoman Empire, acceded to the Kakhetians' demand. Teimuraz was crowned King of Kakheti and began a long and difficult reign in conflict with his Safavid overlords.

Since the new monarch was still underage, Queen Ketevan temporarily assumed the function of a regent and arranged, in 1607, Teimuraz's marriage to Princess Ana Gurieli, daughter of Mamia II Gurieli, Prince of Guria on Georgia's Black Sea coast. In 1610, Ana died of a throat tumor and Teimuraz remarried, with Shah Abbas's encouragement, Khoreshan of Kartli, sister of Luarsab II, Kakheti's western neighbor, while the Shah himself married Teimuraz's sister Helene.

== Iranian invasion ==
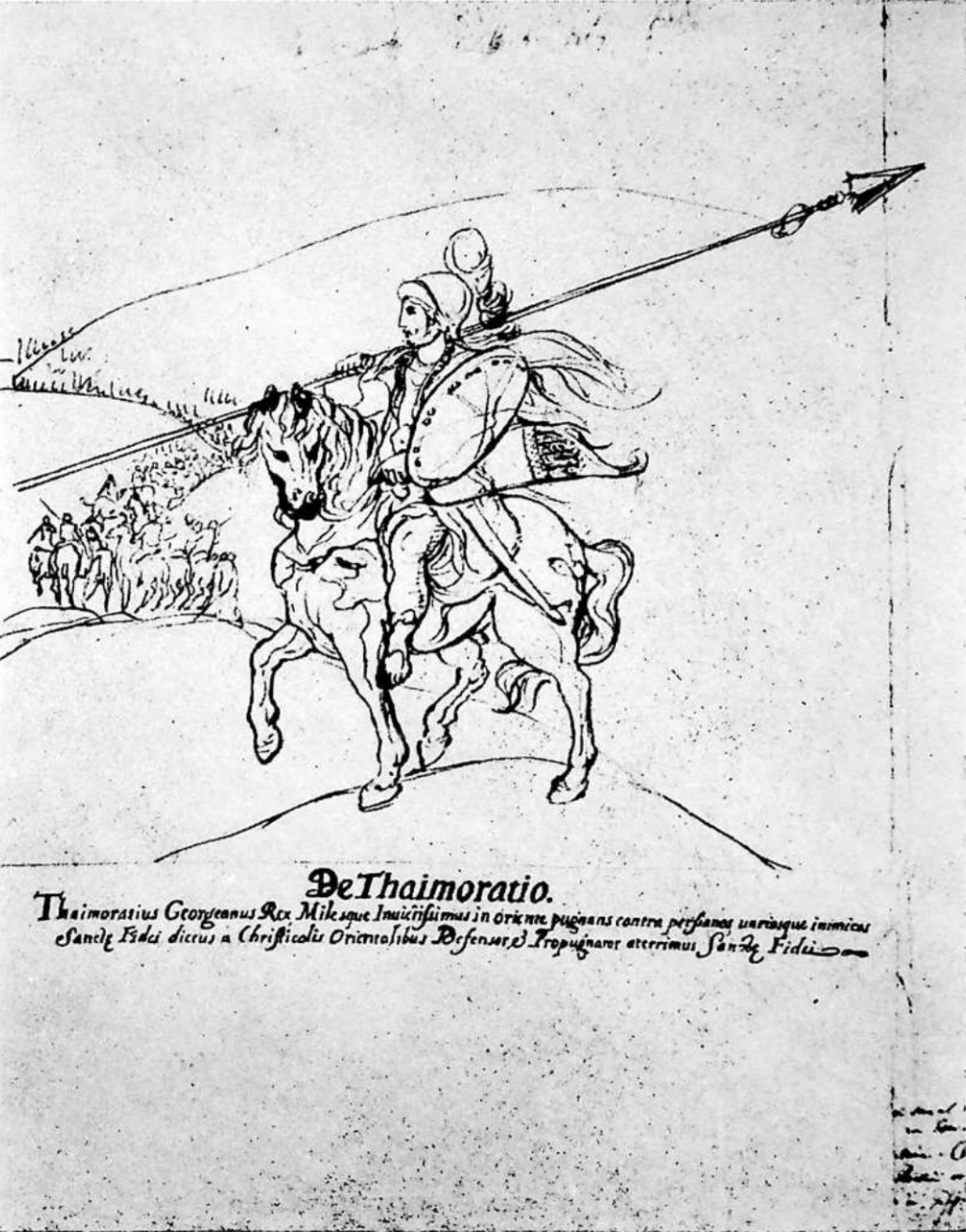
Teimuraz I, prepared for battle. A sketch from the album of the contemporaneous missionary Cristoforo Castelli.

As the Safavid-Ottoman war drew to its close, Abbas I renewed efforts to bring Georgia more completely into his empire. His relations with Teimuraz I quickly deteriorated after the king of Kakheti turned down the shah's summons to Isfahan. Teimuraz, threatened with an Iranian invasion, attempted to buy peace by sending his two sons, Levan and Alexander, and his mother Ketevan as honorary hostages to the shah's court in 1613. This move, however, failed to relieve pressures on Kakheti.

Once the hostilities with the Ottomans had ceased momentarily in 1614 with the Iranian army at its acme, Abbas I sent in his troops against the Georgian kingdoms. This time he was aided by the Georgian nobleman, Giorgi Saakadze, an able fighter who had formerly enjoyed much influence in the service of Luarsab II of Kartli until a threat to his life had led him to defect to the shah. The Iranians drove both Teimuraz and Luarsab from their realms into the western Georgian Kingdom of Imereti, and Abbas I replaced them with Georgian converts to Islam. Bagrat VII was installed in Kartli, while Kakheti was given to Teimuraz's cousin Isa Khan. George III of Imereti, under the Ottoman protection, refused to give up the refugees and the shah retaliated by giving Kartli and Kakheti over to his troops for pillage. Then Luarsab chose to surrender, but rejected the shah's request to renounce Christianity. Abbas exiled him to Iran and had him strangled at Shiraz in 1622.

While in exile in Imereti in 1615, Teimuraz I joined George III of Imereti in sending a letter to Tsar Michael of Russia, informing him of their opposition to the Iranian shah and requesting aid. Recovering from the Time of Troubles, Russians were not prepared and did not intend to intervene in the Caucasian affairs, however. Left to their own devices, the Kakhetian nobles rallied behind David Jandieri and revolted against Isa Khan on September 15, 1615. The rebellion quickly spread to Kartli, and the Georgian nobles proposed Teimuraz I as king of all of eastern Georgia. A punitive Iranian expedition under the command of Ali Quli-Khan was routed by Teimuraz's forces at Tsitsamuri, leading Shah Abbas to personally lead the next invasion in 1616. The rebellion was quashed, and Teimuraz once again fled to western Georgia. Kakheti was subjected to a complete devastation from which this kingdom never fully recovered. As the official history of Shah Abbas's reign, the Alam-ara proclaims: "Since the beginning of Islam no such events have taken place under any king."

Once flourishing towns of Kakheti, like Gremi and Zagem, shrank to villages and several settlements disappeared. Sixty to seventy thousand people were killed, and more than one hundred thousand Kakhetian peasants were deported into the Safavid possessions. Their descendants make up the bulk of the ethnic Georgian population of present-day Iran, and a Georgian dialect is still spoken in and around Fereydunshahr, Isfahan province.

== Rebel king ==
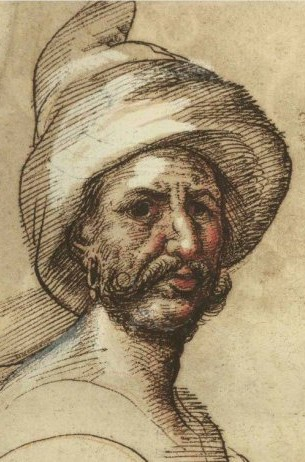
Giorgi Saakadze.

Letter to King Philip IV of Spain from Teimuraz I.

Teimuraz continued to seek and exploit Russian and Ottoman aid against Iran and remained a rallying point for opposition to the Safavids, encouraging his subjects to reject a Muslim replacement for him. Shah Abbas took revenge by torturing to death the king's mother, Ketevan, on September 13, 1624, and castrating his sons, Levan and Alexander.

Meanwhile, Abbas I's appointed governor of Kakheti, Paykar Khan, embarked on a campaign to resettle the depopulated areas of eastern Georgia with Turkic nomads, sparking a rebellion by the remaining Georgian population. The shah's former Georgian ally, Giorgi Saakadze, or Mourav-Beg as he was known in Iran, joined the revolt and led the Georgians to a victory over the Iranian army led by Qarachaqay Khan at the Battle of Martkopi on March 25, 1625. Saakadze went on to annihilate the Turkic migrants and reinstated Teimuraz as king of Kartli and Kakheti. The shah failed to crush the uprising despite the costly victory over the Georgians at the Battle of Marabda on July 1, 1625. Faced by guerrilla resistance in the highlands of Georgia, Abbas recognized the rebel king's right to rule.

The Georgian nobility, however, soon divided into two opposing camps. On one side stood Saakadze and his followers who objected to Teimuraz's control of Kartli and intended to invite the Imeretian prince Alexander (the future King Alexander III of Imereti) as a new king. On the other, Teimuraz and his loyal Kakhetian party who gained an influential supporter in Saakadze's brother-in-law and erstwhile associate Zurab, eristavi ("duke") of Aragvi. Shah Abbas I, suspicious of Saakadze's diplomacy with the Ottomans, also encouraged Teimuraz to deal a final blow to the ambitious general. Later in 1626, the rivalry among the Georgian leaders culminated in the Battle of Bazaleti in which the royal army won a decisive victory, driving Saakadze into exile to Constantinople where he was put to death in 1629 after serving a brief military career under Sultan Ibrahim I.

After the defeat of Saakadze and the death of Shah Abbas I in 1629, Teimuraz proceeded to strengthen his authority in eastern Georgia. He instigated Zurab of Aragvi to murder Semayun Khan, an Iranian-appointed rival king of Kartli in 1630, and then had Zurab assassinated, thereby getting rid of them both. By the early 1630s, Teimuraz I had gained more or less stable control of both Kartli and Kakheti. Determined to eliminate the Safavid hegemony over Georgia, Teimuraz sent his ambassador, Niciphores Irbachi, to Western Europe and requested the aid from Philip IV of Spain and Pope Urban VIII. However, the rulers of Europe were too involved in the Thirty Years' War (1618–1648) to be concerned about the fate of a small Caucasian kingdom, and nothing came of this mission, the publication of the first Georgian printed book Dittionario giorgiano e italiano ("Georgian-Italian Dictionary"; Rome, 1629) by Stefano Paolini and Niciphores Irbachi being the only result of this embassy.

== End of reign ==
Meanwhile, Teimuraz relations with the new Iranian shah, Safi, progressively deteriorated. In 1631, Teimuraz avenged the mountainous tribes of Dagestan for having joined Shah Abbas in the destruction of Kakheti, and devastated several of their settlements (auls). In 1633, he gave shelter to his brother-in-law Daud Khan, the Iranian governor (beglarbeg) of Ganja and Karabakh of Georgian extraction, who had fled Shah Safi's crackdown on the family of his brother Imam Quli Khan, the influential governor of Fars, Lar and Bahrain. Teimuraz refused to surrender the fugitive, and, fully appreciating the consequences of this refusal, gathered his forces in haste. Shah Safi retaliated by declaring Teimuraz deposed and replacing him with his favorite, a Muslim Georgian prince Khosro Mirza (Rostom), who had played an important role in consolidating Safi's hold of power after Shah Abbas's death.

Rostom and his fellow Georgian in the Safavid service, Rostam Khan, led the Iranian army into Georgia and took control of Kartli and Kakheti in 1633. Teimuraz escaped into yet another exile to Imereti, but re-established himself in Kakheti in 1634. In 1638, through Rostom's mediation, Teimuraz was pardoned and reconfirmed as king of Kakheti by the shah. He resumed his quest for alliance with Russia, however, and took an oath of allegiance to Tsar Michael on April 23, 1639, but the Russian protectorate never materialized in practice.

In 1641, Teimuraz, who was intent upon uniting all of eastern Georgia under his rule, backed a nobles' conspiracy against Rostom, which finally ruined his relations with the ruler of Kartli. The plot collapsed and the king of Kakheti, who had already advanced with his troops to the walls of Tbilisi, Rostom's capital, had to withdraw. In 1648, Rostom, joined by an Iranian force, marched against Kakheti and routed Teimuraz's army at Magharo. Having lost his last surviving son, David, on the battlefield, Teimuraz fled to Imereti whence he endeavored to regain the crown with the Russian aid. He sent his grandson, Heraclius, to Moscow in 1653, and personally visited Tsar Alexis of Russia in June 1658.

In the meantime, Rostom's willingness to cooperate with his Safavid suzerains won for Kartli a large measure of autonomy and relative peace and prosperity. However, the nobles and the populace of Kakheti continued to rally around the exiled Teimuraz in the hope of ending their subjection to Iran. In order to end resistance in Kakheti once and for all, Shah Abbas II revived a plan to populate the country with the Turkic nomads, a measure that incited a general uprising in 1659. The rebels succeeded in expelling the nomads but still had to grudgingly accept the shah's suzerainty.

Unable to garner the Russian support for his cause, Teimuraz concluded that the prospects for recovering the crown were nil and returned to Imereti to retire to a monastery in 1661, the same year when Rostom's successor to the throne of Kartli, Vakhtang V, crossed into western Georgia to enthrone his son, Archil II, as king of Imereti. Vakhtang V sent Teimuraz to Isfahan and the old Georgian ex-monarch was honorably received by Abbas II, but cast into prison when his grandson Heraclius returned from Russia and made a failed attempt at taking control of Kakheti. Teimuraz died in captivity at the fortress of Astarabad in 1663. His remains were transported to Georgia and interred at the Alaverdi Monastery.

== Poetry ==
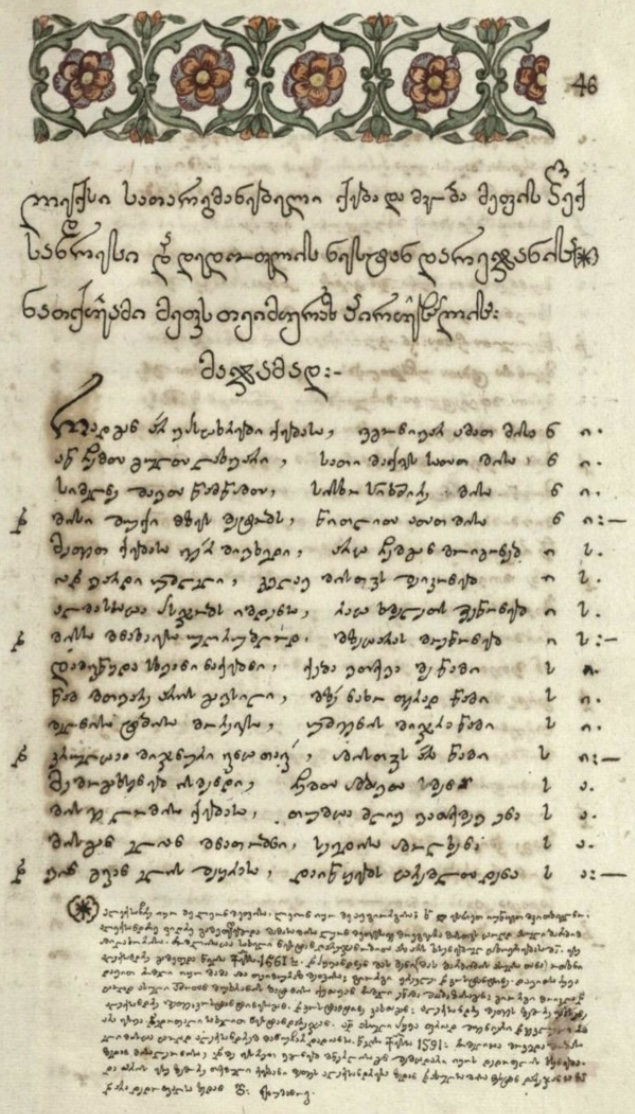
Poem by Teimuraz I.

Teimuraz I's literary works addresses a wide range of topics and includes his original poems as well as translations and adaptations from Persian. This king-poet had such a universal knowledge of Persian and Georgian literature and was so proud of his innovations into the Georgian poetry, that, in his old age, Teimuraz proclaimed himself the greatest poet of Georgia and thought himself superior to the celebrated medieval Georgian author Shota Rustaveli. Although no such claim has ever been accepted by the critics of Georgian literature, there can be no doubt that his courtly and rather mannered lyricism had a certain influence on the 17th-19th-century Georgian poetry. Educated at the Safavid court, he was proficiently fluent in Persian, and his poetic language was full of Persian imagery and allusions, loanwords, and phraseology. Commenting on his interest in Persian poetry, he wrote: "The sweetness of Persian speech urged me to compose the music of verse." During his first creative period, 1629–34, when he was relatively secure on his throne, Teimuraz translated and adapted from Persian the romances of Layla and Majnun (Georgian: ლეილმაჯნუნიანი, romanized: leilmajnuniani), Yusuf and Zulaikha (Georgian: იოსებზილიხანიანი, romanized: iosebzilikhaniani), The Rose and the Nightingale (Georgian: ვარდბულბულიანი, romanized: vardbulbuliani), and The Candle and the Moth (Georgian: შამიფარვანიანი, romanized: shamiparvaniani).

The second period, 1649–56, was in exile at the court of his son-in-law, Alexander III of Imereti, when Teimuraz, in his own words, used poetry as therapy: "Tears flowed mercilessly like the Nile from my eyes. To overcome I wrote from time to time, I threw my heart into it." In his poems, Teimuraz laments the destruction of his kingdom, condemning the "transient and perfidious world", and mourns the fate of his family and friends, cursing the cause of his own and his people's misfortunes, the "bloodthirsty king of Persia."

Teimuraz's most elaborate and painful poem, however, was his first, The Book and Passion of Queen Ketevan (წიგნი და წამება ქეთევან დედოფლისა, ts'igni da ts'ameba ketevan dedoplisa) written in 1625, seven months after his mother, Ketevan, was martyred in Shiraz on September 13, 1624. The poem, which in the words of Professor Donald Rayfield proves that "whatever Georgia lost in the king, it gained in the poet", is influenced by the medieval Georgian hagiographic genre, vividly describing the tortures to which the queen mother is subjected after she refuses to follow Shah Abbas's order to renounce Christianity. Teimuraz quotes her prayer to the Holy Trinity and the Archangel Gabriel for the strength to endure and spares the reader nothing of the horrors of Ketevan's execution. Teimuraz's immediate source were the eyewitnesses of the event, the Augustinian missionaries from Iran, who brought the king his mother's remains. The same source is shared by another description of Ketevan's martyrdom, the classical tragedy Katharine von Georgien by the German author Andreas Gryphius (1657).

== Family ==
Teimuraz was first married to Ana, daughter of Mamia II Gurieli, Prince of Guria. She died of an ulcerated throat in 1610. They had two sons:

- Prince Levan (1608–1620), who was taken hostage by Abbas I of Persia in 1614 and castrated in an act of revenge in 1620 (or 1618). He went mad and died shortly thereafter.
- Prince Alexander (1609–1620), who was also taken hostage by Abbas I of Persia in 1614 and castrated in 1620 (or 1618). He did not survive the mutilation and died soon afterward.

In 1612, Teimuraz married Khoreshan, daughter of George X and sister of Luarsab II. They had three children:

- Prince David (1612–1648), who was appointed Prince of Mukhrani (1626–1628) by his father. He was killed at the Battle of Magharo fighting against the Iranians, leaving three sons, including Heraclius I of Kakheti, who later reigned as King of Kartli (r. 1688–1703) and Kakheti (r. 1703–1709).
- Princess Darejan (died 1668), who was successively married to Zurab I, Duke of Aragvi in 1623, Alexander III of Imereti in 1629, and Vakhtang of Imereti in 1661. She became notorious for her controversial role in the politics of western Georgia.
- Princess Tinatin, who married Safi of Persia in 1637.

== Notes ==
Regnal titles
Preceded by Constantine I	King of Kakheti; 1606–1614	Succeeded by Jesse
Preceded by Jesse	King of Kakheti; 1615–1616	Succeeded by Interregnum
Preceded by Interregnum	King of Kakheti; 1625–1633	Succeeded by Interregnum
Preceded by Interregnum	King of Kakheti; 1634–1648	Succeeded by Union with Kartli under Rostom
Preceded by Simon II (Rival king 1625–1631)	King of Kartli; 1625–1633	Succeeded by Rostom
