= Princess Marta of Kakheti =

17th century Georgian princess royal of the Bagrationi dynasty

Marta (Georgian: მართა) was a Georgian princess royal of the Bagrationi dynasty, and a wife of the Safavid Iranian king (shah) Abbas I (r. 1588–1629).

Marta was a daughter of David I by his wife Ketevan, daughter of Ashotan I, Prince of Mukhrani.

She married Abbas I on 20 September 1604. The two divorced in c. 1614.

== Sources ==
- Bierbrier, Morris (1997). "The Descendants of Theodora Comnena of Trebizond". The Genealogist. 11 (2).
- Butler, John Anthony (2012). Sir Thomas Herbert: Travels in Africa, Persia, and Asia the Great, by Sir Anthony Herbert, Bart. ACMRS Publications. ISBN 978-0866984751.
