= Georgia–India relations =

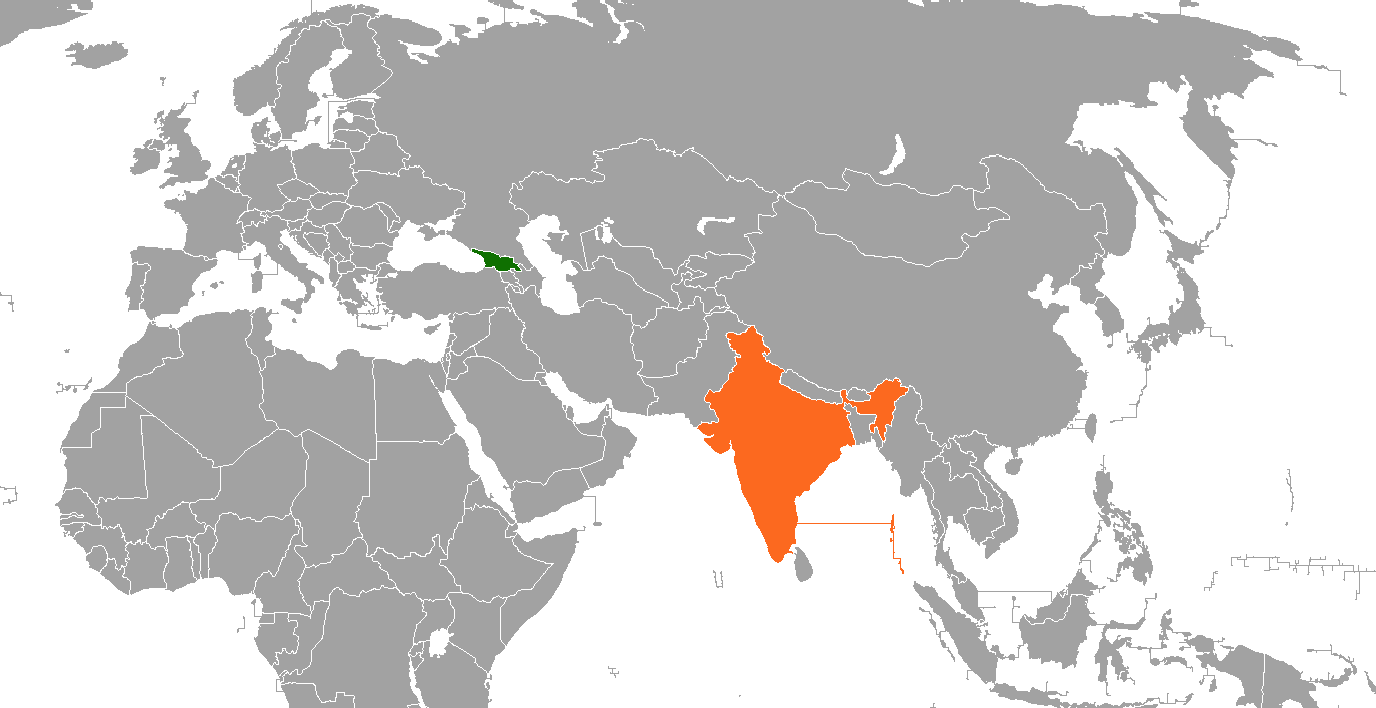
- Georgia: India

Georgia and India maintain diplomatic relations. India maintains an embassy in Tbilisi. Georgia maintains an embassy in New Delhi.

== History ==
Relations between Georgia and India date back to ancient times. The Panchatantra influenced Georgian folk legends. According to Ancient Greece popular culture, after numerous deaths in Argonauts and Theseus came back for the throne, Medea finally returned to Colchis while her son Medus fought in numerous wars until he met his death while marching against the Indians.

While it remains unknown whether there is any verifiable history behind these Ancient Greek tales, numerous rulers of Colchis claimed to be descendants of Aeëtes and not denying the deeds of his grandson Medus as fictional.

During the medieval period, Georgian missionaries, travelers, and traders visited India. Some Georgians served in the courts of Mughal emperors, and a few rose to the rank of governor. Udaipuri Begum, one of Mughal emperor Aurangzeb's wives, was of Georgian descent.

Georgian historians theorize that the remains of Georgian Queen Ketevan, who died in Shiraz, Iran in 1624, were transferred to St. Augustine Tower in Goa by the Portuguese. On 24 September 2017, the Government of India transferred the remains to the Georgian National Museum and the Holy Trinity Church (Sameba) in Tbilisi for a period of six months during which both religious and scientific events were staged. On 9 July 2021, the holy relics were gifted to the Georgian government and to Catholicos-Patriarch Ilia II by Indian Foreign Minister S. Jaishankar.

Jawaharlal Nehru visited Tbilisi in 1955, during his tour of the Soviet Union, and met with Georgian Indologist and Sanskrit scholar Giorgi Akhvlediani. Indira Gandhi visited the city during her tour of the Soviet Union in 1976. Foreign Minister Atal Bihari Vajpayee visited Georgia in June 1978.

India was among the first countries to officially recognize Georgia, doing so on 26 December 1991. Diplomatic relations were established 28 September 1992. Georgian Foreign Minister Irakli Menagarishvili visited New Delhi in May 2000. This was the first diplomatic visit between the two countries since Georgia's independence. Menagarishvili held bilateral discussions with Foreign Minister Jaswant Singh on 11 May.

As of 2026, India does not recognize Abkhazia or South Ossetia.

Georgia opened an honorary consulate in New Delhi in 2005, and upgraded it to an embassy in 2010. The first resident Ambassador of Georgia to India assumed office on 25 February 2010. Secretary in the Ministry of Overseas Indian Affairs Parvez Dewan represented India at the first "Day of Diaspora" celebrations in Tbilisi in May 2012. Deputy Foreign Minister David Jalagania led a Georgian delegation to attend the first Inter-Governmental Commission (IGC) in Delhi April 2014. India's Central Election Commissioner Nasim Zaidi participated in the International Conference of Election Commissioners in Batumi in February 2015. An Indian Foreign Ministry delegation attended the AIIB Founding Member countries Expert Meeting in Tbilisi in July 2015. Chairperson of the Election Commission of Georgia Tamar Zhvania visited New Delhi on 13 July 2015. During the visit, the two countries signed an MoU for cooperation in election management and administration.

Indian Election Commissioner O.P. Rawat and two other Election Commission officials visited Kakheti province, Georgia to participate in a multilateral event on electoral practices in February 2016. Deputy Economy Minister Ketevan Bochorishvili visited India in April 2016. She promoted a "Film in Georgia" project to Indian directors, producers and film studios. A delegation from India International Institute of Democracy and Election Management (IIIDEM) visited Tbilisi to conduct training for officials of the Election Commission of Georgia in June 2016. The Second Session of the India-Georgia Inter-Governmental Commission on Trade, Economic, Scientific & Technological, Cultural and Educational Cooperation (IGC) was held in Tbilisi on 25 July 2016.

Georgia has supported India at various international fora and multilateral organizations. The country supported India's candidatures at the International Civil Aviation Organization (ICAO), the executive board of UNESCO, and membership of the Council of International Maritime Organization (IMO) in 2013, the UNHRC in 2014, and the World Customs Organization in 2015. India voted for Georgia's candidature at the International Hydrographic Organization (IHO) in 2013.

== Economic relations ==
Bilateral trade between Georgia and India totaled US$107.04 million in 2015–16, declining slightly from $105.02 million in the previous fiscal. India exported $82.57 million worth of goods to Georgia, and imported $24.47 million. The main commodities exported by India to Georgia are cereals, nuclear reactors, boilers, machinery and mechanical appliances, pharmaceuticals, electrical machinery and equipment, aluminium and aluminium articles. The major commodities imported by India from Georgia are fertilisers, aluminium and aluminum articles, copper and copper articles.

India's foreign direct investment in Georgia rose from $29,000 in 2005 to $26 million by November 2011. An FDI of US$6.13 million was made by Indian companies in Georgia in the third quarter of 2012 alone. JSW Steel Netherlands BV, the Dutch subsidiary of Indian firm JSW Steel, partnered with Georgian Steel Group Holding Limited to establish a plant to convert metal scraps into reinforced steel bars. The plant was officially inaugurated by President in November 2009. Trans Electrica was founded by Indian firm Continental Construction, along with British and Georgian firms, to construct a hydro power plant in Georgia. Escorts Group maintain authorized distributor in Tbilisi to sell their tractors and other products.

Indian firms have made large investments in steel, infrastructure, agriculture farming and service sectors in Georgia. Around 150 Indians, mostly from Punjab, have acquired a combined total of about 1500 hectares of agricultural land for cultivation in Georgia. This is facilitated by the Georgian Government's policy of encouraging immigration of people with agricultural knowledge to the country in an effort to boost its declining agricultural production. Indian farmers are attracted by the low cost of land in Georgia. One Punjabi Sikh farmer who emigrated to Georgia noted that he could purchase 200 hectares of land in Georgia from the money made by selling one hectare of land in Punjab. Tata Power invested around $280 million in a power project in Georgia.

In February 2014, an Indian pharmaceutical delegation visited Georgia for the first time. They visited several pharmaceutical plants and labs in Georgia and held discussions with Georgian businesses. The first ever India Tourism Seminar "Incredible India" was held in Tbilisi on 26 September 2014. It was organized by the Embassy of India in Yerevan and the Regional Office of Tourism of India in Frankfurt, Germany. Sixty-two Georgian tour operators attended the seminar.

== Cultural relations ==
Indian films and cuisine are popular in Georgia, and there are several Indian restaurants in Tbilisi. There is some interest in the Hindi language among Georgians.

The Institute of Multi Task Diplomacy in Tbilisi, with support from the Mahatma Gandhi Foundation in India, founded the Gandhi Foundation Georgia on 30 June 2014 in Tbilisi to promote Gandhian philosophy in the country. The Gandhi Foundation Georgia established a its second branch in Batumi. Superintending Archaeologist of Archaeological Survey of India (ASI) Taher visited Georgia to attend the International Council of Museums' Conference in September 2014.

As of July 2016, around 2,000 Indian citizens reside in Georgia, almost half of whom are students at the Tbilisi State Medical University. About 200 citizens are employed by Indian companies involved in the infrastructure sector in Georgia, while others are businessmen, agricultural farmers and workers.

== Foreign aid ==
India donated ₹5 lakh (equivalent to ₹36 lakh or US$38,000 in 2026) worth of medicines and relief supplies to refugees and displaced persons from Abkhazia in December 1994.

Citizens of Georgia are eligible for scholarships under the Indian Technical and Economic Cooperation Programme. The Indian Council for Cultural Relations (ICCR) provides scholarships for Georgians to pursue undergraduate and postgraduate courses at universities in India. The ICCR also offers Kendriya Hindi Sansthan scholarships to study Hindi in India. The ICCR established a Chair of Contemporary Indian Studies at the Tbilisi State University in October 2011.

== Resident diplomatic missions ==
- Georgia has an embassy in New Delhi.
- India has an embassy in Tbilisi

== See also ==
- Foreign relations of Georgia
- Foreign relations of India
