= Battle of Tsitsamuri =

1615 battle

- Part of Kakhetian Uprising (1615)
| Date | 1615 |
| Location | Tsitsamuri, Georgia 41°51′39″N 44°43′57″E |
| Result | Georgian victory |

Belligerents
| Kingdom of Kakheti | Safavid Persia |

Commanders and leaders
| Teimuraz I | Ali-Quli Khan |

Strength
| 5,000 to 6,000 | 15,000 |

Casualties and losses
| Low | Very heavy |

The Battle of Tsitsamuri (Georgian: წიწამურის ბრძოლა) was fought in 1615 between the armies of Kingdom of Kakheti under Teimuraz I and Persian Empire led by Ali Kuli Khan.

== Battle ==
The battle took place after the initiation of the rebellion by Teimuraz I of Georgia, David Jandieri and Nodar Jorjadze in September 15, 1615. Shah Abbas I sent his general, Ali Kuli Khan Shamlu with 15,000 Qizilbash militants to crush the uprising, who set up fortifications near the village of Tsitsamuri. The Georgians attacked the Persian encampment at noon. Teimuraz I personally led the center of his army, while David and Nodar commanded right and left flanks respectively. After destroying the center of the Qizilbash army, the Persian flanks were routed with ease. Georgians ran down the retreating Persians and killed most of them, while others drowned in the Kura and Aragvi rivers. The Georgians were left with a large loot. According to contemporary Georgian historian Parsadan Gorgijanidze, "the prices of camels were halved after salvaging the stashes from Persian camps".

== Aftermath ==
Despite the important victory won by the Georgians in 1615, the rebellion was crushed the following year when Shah Abbas I personally led the second invasion with a much larger army. Teimuraz I fled to Imeretia once again. The Shah, unable to halt the partisan warfare of the rebels, burned down villages and towns one by one, killing 100,000 Kakhetians and deporting 150,000 to 200,000 to Persia. According to a contemporary historian Iskander Mus, "the day had come for second coming for the Georgians".
