= Ketevan the Martyr =

Queen of Kakheti from 1601 to 1602, Georgian Orthodox saint

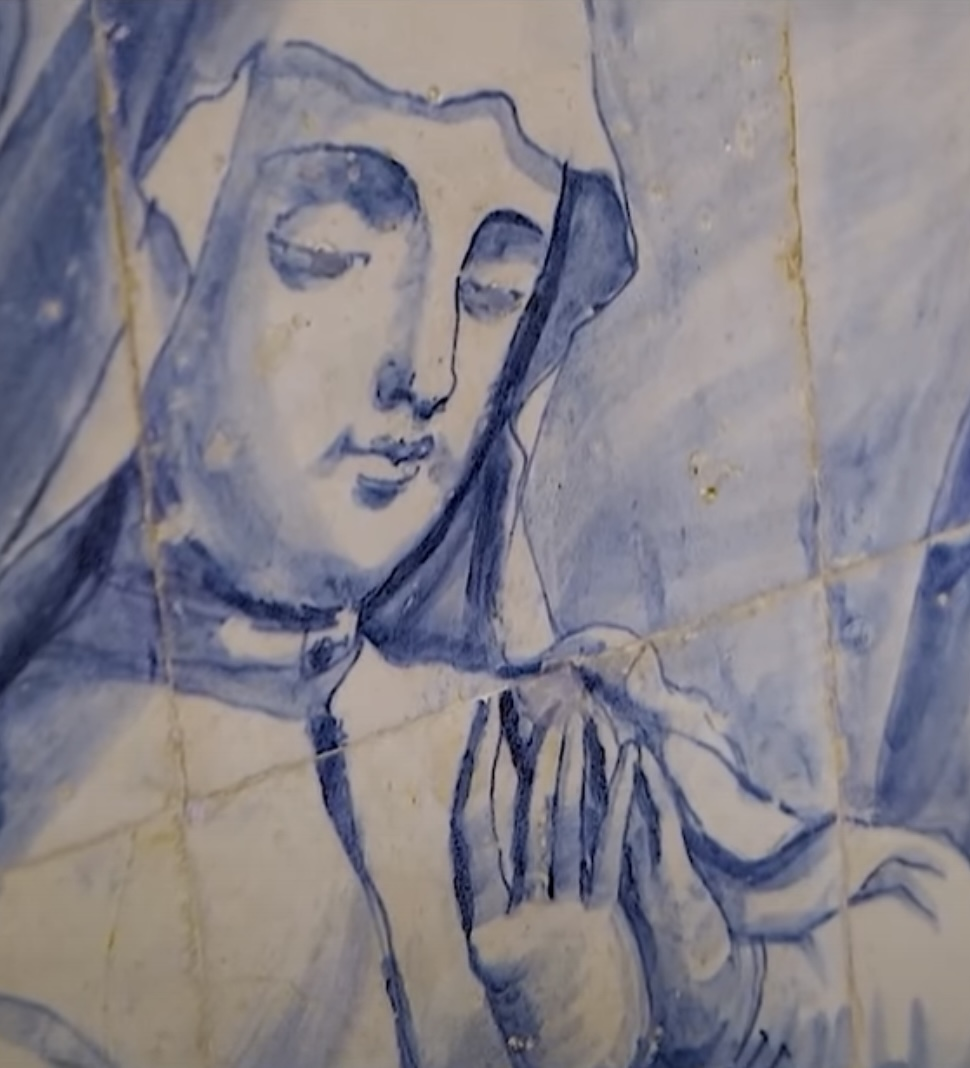
- Ketevan depicted on an azulejo at the Graça Convent in Lisbon

Queen consort of Kakheti
- Tenure: 1601–1602

Regent of Kakheti
- Regency: 1605–1614
- Monarch: Teimuraz I
- Died: 13 September 1624; Shiraz
- Burial: Alaverdi Monastery
- Spouse: David I of Kakheti
- Issue: Teimuraz I Vakhtang; Helena; Marta
- Dynasty: Bagrationi-Mukhrani
- Father: Ashotan I, Prince of Mukhrani
- Religion: Georgian Orthodox Church
- Khelrtva

Saint Ketevan
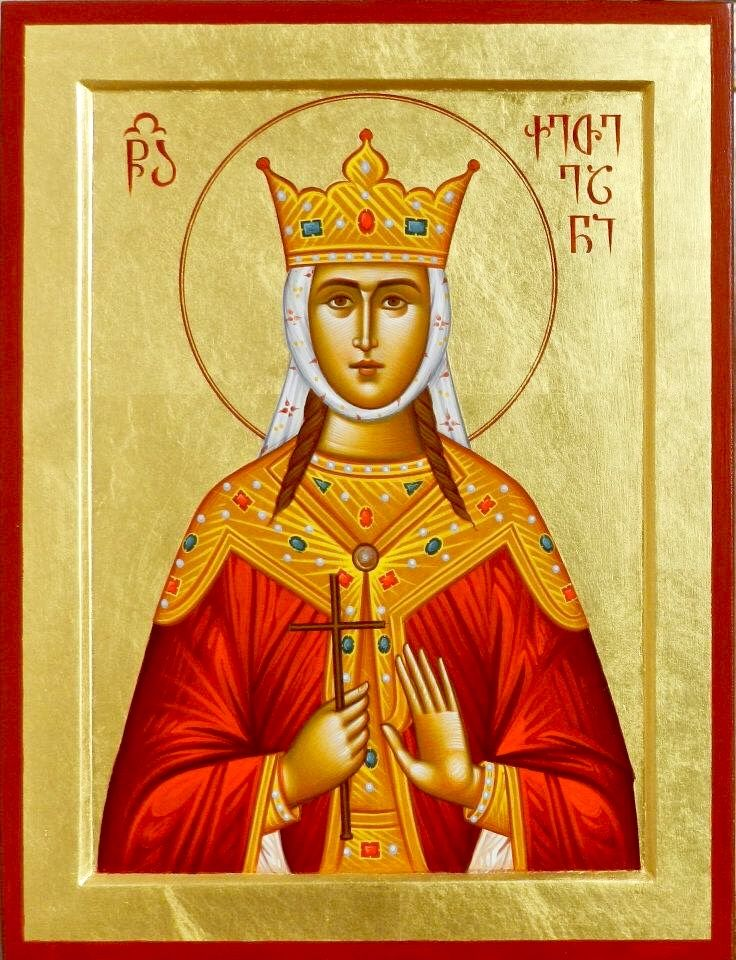
- Icon of Ketevan the Martyr

Great martyr
- Died: 13 September 1624
- Venerated in: Eastern Orthodox Church
- Feast: 13 September

Ketevan the Great Martyr (Georgian: ქეთევან წამებული, romanized: ketevan ts'amebuli; died 13 September 1624) was a queen consort of Kakheti, a kingdom in eastern Georgia. She was regent of Kakheti during the minority of her son Teimuraz I of Kakheti from 1605 to 1614. She was killed in Shiraz, Iran, after prolonged tortures by the Safavid suzerains of Kakheti for refusing to give up the Christian faith and convert to Islam. She has been canonized as a saint by the Georgian Orthodox Church.

== Life ==
Ketevan was born to Prince Ashotan Bagration of Mukhrani and married Prince David Bagration of Kakheti, the future David I, King of Kakheti from 1601 to 1602.

After David's death, she engaged in religious building and charity. However, when David's brother Constantine I killed his reigning father, Alexander II, and usurped the crown with the Safavid Iranian support in 1605, Ketevan rallied the Kakhetian nobles against the patricide and routed Constantine's loyal force. The usurper died in battle. According to the Safavid official and chronicler, Fażli Ḵuzāni, Ketevan showed characteristic mercy to Constantine's surviving supporters and his Qizilbash officers. She ordered that the wounded enemy soldiers be treated accordingly and accepted in service if they desired. The Muslim merchants, who suffered in the war, were compensated and set free. Ketevan had Constantine's body laid to rest and sent to Ardebil.

After the uprising she negotiated with Shah Abbas I of Iran who was the suzerain over Georgia, to confirm her underage son, Teimuraz I, as king of Kakheti, while she assumed the function of a regent.

In 1614, sent by Teimuraz as a negotiator to Shah Abbas, Ketevan effectively surrendered herself as an honorary hostage in a failed attempt to prevent Kakheti from being attacked by the Iranian armies. She was held in Shiraz for several years until Abbas I, in an act of revenge for the recalcitrance of Teimuraz, ordered the queen to renounce Christianity, and upon her refusal, had her tortured to death with red-hot pincers in 1624. Portions of her relics were clandestinely taken by the St. Augustine Portuguese Catholic missioners, eyewitnesses of her martyrdom, to Georgia, where they were interred at the Alaverdi Monastery. The rest of her remains were said to have been buried at the Church of St. Augustine in Goa, India. After several expeditions to Goa in the 21st century to search for the remains, they were believed to be found in late 2013.

=== Sainthood ===
Queen Ketevan was canonized by Patriarch Zachary of Georgia (1613–1630), and September 13 (corresponding to September 26 in the modern Gregorian calendar) was instituted by the Georgian Orthodox Church as the day of her commemoration.

The account of Ketevan's martyrdom related by the Augustinians missioners was exploited by her son, Teimuraz, in his poem The Book and Passion of Queen Ketevan (წიგნი და წამება ქეთევან დედოფლისა, ts'igni da ts'ameba ketevan dedoplisa; 1625) as well as by the German author Andreas Gryphius in his classical tragedy Catharina von Georgien (1657). The Georgian monk Grigol Dodorkeli-Vakhvakhishvili of the David Gareja Monastery was another near-contemporaneous author whose writings, a hagiographic work as well as several hymns, focus on Ketevan's life and martyrdom. The Scottish poet William Forsyth composed the poem The Martyrdom of Kelavane (1861), based on Jean Chardin's account of Ketevan's death.

== Relics and archaeological findings ==
=== Portugal ===
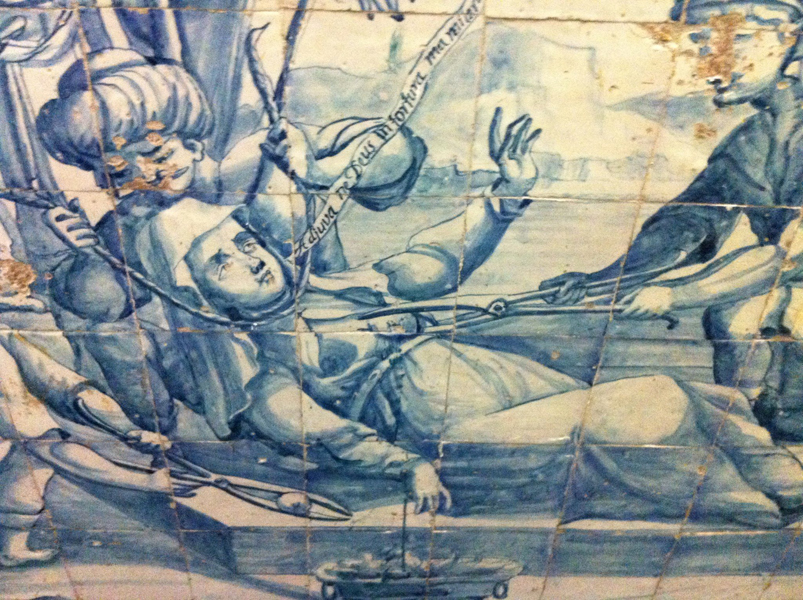
The scene of the martyrdom of Ketevan on a panoramic azulejo.

In 2008, it was discovered that Graça Convent in Lisbon, Portugal contained a previously unknown, large panoramic azulejo depicting Queen Ketavan's martyrdom in Persia. The scenes were based on accounts of her martyrdom by Portuguese Augustinian missionaries who witnessed her death. Panoramic tilework was in a state of disrepair and Georgia offered thousands of euros for repairs.

In 2017, a full replica of the Portuguese depiction of Ketevan's martyrdom was unveiled in Georgia and displayed at the Palace of Mukhrani.

In October 2017, President of Georgia Giorgi Margvelashvili visited Queen Ketevan's mural at the Graça Convent during his official trip to Portugal. Restoration works continued and an agreement was signed between the convent and the National Agency of Cultural Heritage Preservation of the Ministry of Culture of Georgia.

=== India (Goa) ===
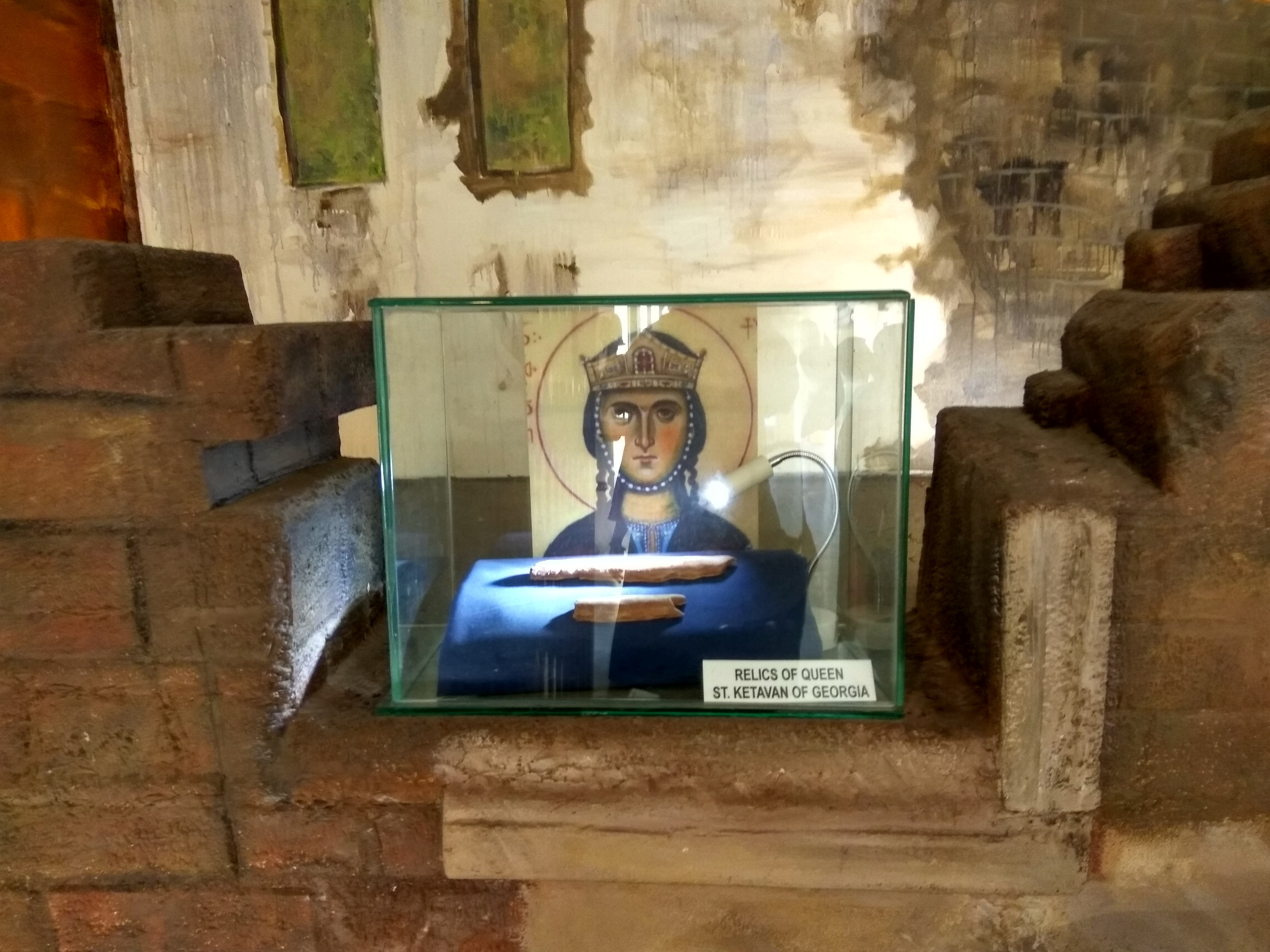
Remains of Queen Ketevan in Goa.

The importance of Queen Ketevan for the Georgian people has led to a relic "hunt" during the last decades, notably in Goa. Since 1989, various delegations coming from Georgia have worked together with the Archaeological Survey of India to try to locate Ketevan's grave within the ruins of the Augustinian convent of Our Lady of Grace, at Old Goa, Goa. These efforts were thwarted because the teams were unable to correctly interpret the Portuguese documents that provided clues as to Ketevan's burial place.

These historical sources stated that Ketevan's palm and arm bone fragments were kept inside a stone urn beneath a specific window within the Chapter Chapel of the Augustinian convent. In May 2004, the Chapter Chapel and window mentioned in the sources were found during a collaboration work between Portuguese and Overseas Citizen of India architect Sidh Losa Mendiratta and the Archaeological Survey of India, Goa-circle (at the time when Nizammudin Taher was superintendent archaeologist). Although the stone urn itself was missing, its coping stone and a number of bone fragments were found close to the window mentioned in the Portuguese sources.

The CSIR-Centre for Cellular and Molecular Biology, Hyderabad, India and Estonian Biocentre Estonia carried out ancient DNA analysis on these human bone remains excavated from the St. Augustine convent by sequencing and genotyping of the mitochondrial DNA. The investigations of the remains revealed an unusual mtDNA haplogroup U1b, which is absent in India, but present in Georgia and surrounding regions. Since the genetic analysis corroborates archaeological and literary evidence, it is likely that the excavated bone belongs to Queen Ketevan of Georgia. However, it is important to keep in mind that Ketevan's palm and arm bone fragments were kept in the same urn as the complete remains of two European missionaries, friar Jerónimo da Cruz and friar Guilherme de Santo Agostinho. Therefore, it would be crucial to determine the sex and the kind of bone of the fragments tested in order to have conclusive results. According to a story in India's Mint on Sunday newspaper, "additional tests confirmed that the U1b bone came from a woman. So, in 2013, it was established that the bone found in two pieces in 2005 was consistent with being from a Georgian woman".

In 2017, celebrating twenty-five years of diplomatic relations between India and Georgia, the relics were sent to Georgia for a period of six months during which both religious and scientific events were staged.

The Indian government has offered some parts of the holy relics of Goa to Georgia. On July 9, 2021, the relics were handed over to the Georgian government and to Catholicos-Patriarch Ilia II of Georgia by Indian Foreign Minister S. Jaishankar.
