= Prince George of Kakheti (died 1605) =

George

Regent of Kakheti
- Reign: 1604 – March 1605
- Monarch: Alexander II
- Died: 12 March 1605; Zagem
- Burial: Alaverdi Monastery
- Spouse: Daughter of Krym-Shevkal (m. 1590) Daughter of Kaikhosro, Pasha of Ganja (m. 1602)
- Issue: Jesse of Kakheti
- Dynasty: Bagrationi
- Father: Alexander II of Kakheti
- Mother: Tinatin Amilakhvari
- Religion: Georgian Orthodox Church
- Khelrtva

George (Georgian: გიორგი, romanized: giorgi; died 12 March 1605), of the Bagrationi dynasty, was a crown prince (batonishvili) of Kakheti, a kingdom in eastern Georgia.

== Biography ==
George was a son of Alexander II, king of Kakheti (1574–1605), who was temporarily dispossessed of the crown by his oldest son David I in 1601. George revolted against David, who managed to pacify his defiant brother through awarding him a large estate. Nevertheless, George conspired with some of the oppositionist nobles, in 1602, to murder David, but the plot collapsed and the prince fled to the neighboring Georgian ruler, George X, who, however, surrendered him to David. George was cast in prison and released when his father, Alexander II, was able to resume his reign upon David's death.

He functioned as a regent during his father's absence at the Safavid Iranian court from early 1604 to March 1605. In August 1604, he received Russian ambassadors and in October employed their armed entourage of 40 musketeers in defeating the expedition of the governors of Ganja and Shemakha against the frontier town of Zagem. On January 1, 1605, George pledged his allegiance to the Tsar of Russia. He was murdered, together with Alexander II, by his Islamized brother Constantin Khan on 12 March 1605.

== Family ==
Prince George first married, in 1590, a daughter of Krym-Shevkal, Sultan of Elisu. He married secondly, in 1602, a daughter of Kaikhosro, Pasha of Ganja. By his first wife, George had one son:

- Prince Jesse (Isa Khan), who, after his father's murder, was raised at the Shah’s court, where he converted to Islam. In 1615, by order of Shah Abbas I, he was proclaimed king of Kakheti following the flight of Teimuraz I. His rule was short-lived, however, as the Kakhetians opposed a Muslim ruler and forced him to flee to Ardabil.

== Ancestry ==
Ancestors of Prince George of Kakheti (died 1605)

16. Alexander I of Kakheti
8. George II of Kakheti
17. Ana Irubakidze-Cholokashvili
4. Levan of Kakheti
9. Helene Irubakidze-Cholokashvili
2. Alexander II of Kakheti
20. Giorgi I Gurieli
10. Mamia I Gurieli
5. Tinatin Gurieli
1. George
24. Mamisa Amilakhvari
12. Taqa Amilakhvari
25. Gulkan N.
6. Bardzim Amilakhvari
26. Zaza Panaskerteli-Tsitsishvili
13. Olympia Panaskerteli-Tsitsishvili
3. Tinatin Amilakhvari

== Bibliography ==
- Allen, W. E. D. (1970). Russian Embassies to the Georgian Kings, 1589–1605: Volumes I and II. Taylor & Francis. ISBN 978-1-317-06040-6.
