= David I of Kakheti =

King of Kakheti from 1601 to 1602

David I
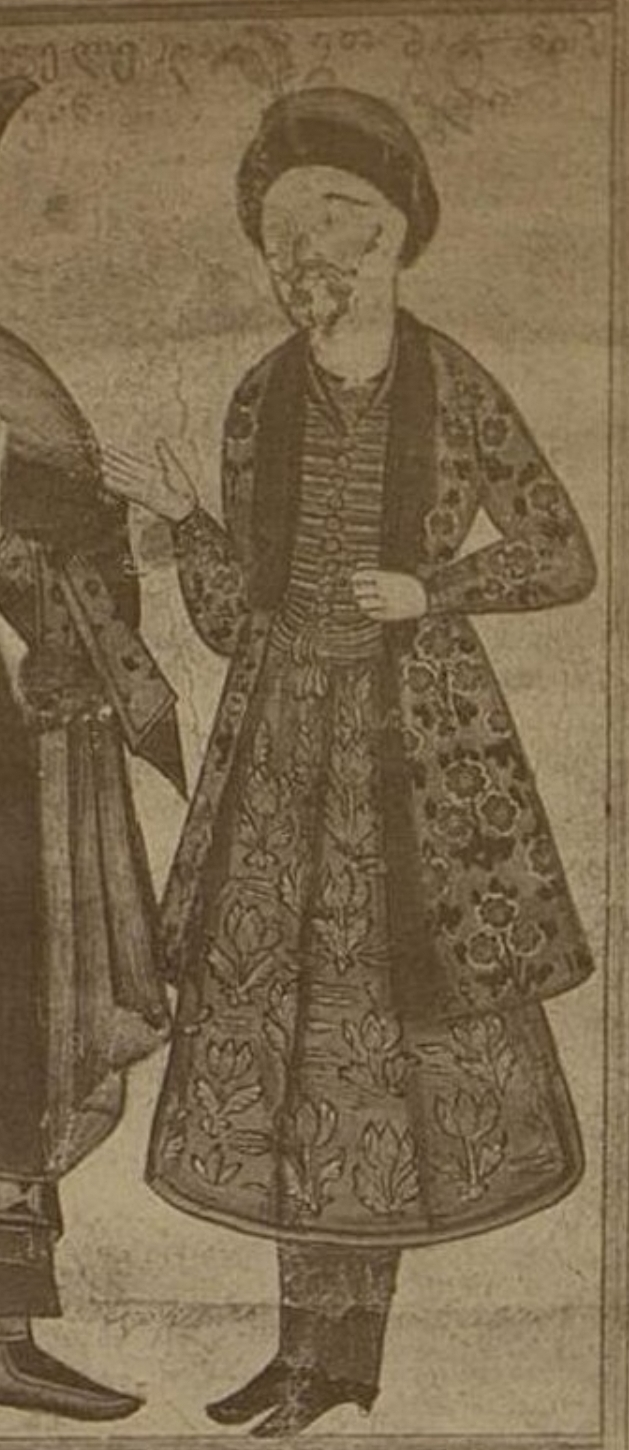
- King David I from King Imam-Qoli Khan's charter to the church of St. David, 1708, 1723.

King of Kakheti
- Reign: October 1601– 21 October 1602
- Predecessor: Alexander II
- Successor: Alexander II
- Died: 21 October 1602; Gremi
- Spouse: Ketevan of Mukhrani (m. 1581)
- Issue Among others: Teimuraz I of Kakheti
- Dynasty: Bagrationi
- Father: Alexander II of Kakheti
- Mother: Tinatin Amilakhvari
- Religion: Georgian Orthodox Church
- Khelrtva

David I (Georgian: დავით I, romanized: davit I; died 21 October 1602), of the Bagrationi dynasty, was a king (mepe) of Kakheti in eastern Georgia from October 1601 until his death in October 1602.

== Biography ==
David was a son of Alexander II of Kakheti by his wife, Princess Tinatin Amilakhvari. In mid-1601, he capitalized on the illness of his father and gained an effective control of the government, sidelining his younger brother George. When Alexander recovered, David refused to relinquish his powers and forced his father into abdication in October 1601. David was crowned king of Kakheti, but his brother, George, masterminded a plot which quickly collapsed and led to repressions. David had George imprisoned while seventeen of his supporters were executed.

David’s foreign policy was a continuation of his father’s line. In 1602, he received a Russian embassy and reaffirmed his loyalty to the tsar. He then marched against Nugzar, the defiant lord of the Aragvi and forced him into submission.

David suddenly died on 21 October 1602, and Alexander II recovered the crown. David is also remembered as a translator of a portion of the Tales of Kalila and Dimna from Persian.

== Family ==
David was married to Ketevan, daughter of Ashotan I, Prince of Mukhrani. Their children were:

- Teimuraz I of Kakheti (1589–1663), King of Kakheti (r. 1606–1648) and Kartli (r. 1625–1632);
- Prince Vakhtang (Bagrat) (fl. 1602–1604);
- Prince Helen, who married Shah Abbas I.

According to Thomas Herbert, David also had one more daughter, Marta, who also married Shah Abbas I.

== Ancestry ==
Ancestors of David I of Kakheti

16. Alexander I of Kakheti
8. George II of Kakheti
17. Ana Irubakidze-Cholokashvili
4. Levan of Kakheti
9. Helene Irubakidze-Cholokashvili
2. Alexander II of Kakheti
20. Giorgi I Gurieli
10. Mamia I Gurieli
5. Tinatin Gurieli
1. David I
24. Mamisa Amilakhvari
12. Taqa Amilakhvari
25. Gulkan N.
6. Bardzim Amilakhvari
26. Zaza Panaskerteli-Tsitsishvili
13. Olympia Panaskerteli-Tsitsishvili
3. Tinatin Amilakhvari

Preceded by Alexander II	King of Kakheti; October 1601- 21 October 1602	Succeeded by Alexander II
