= Alexander II of Kakheti =

King of Kakheti from 1574 to 1605

Alexander II
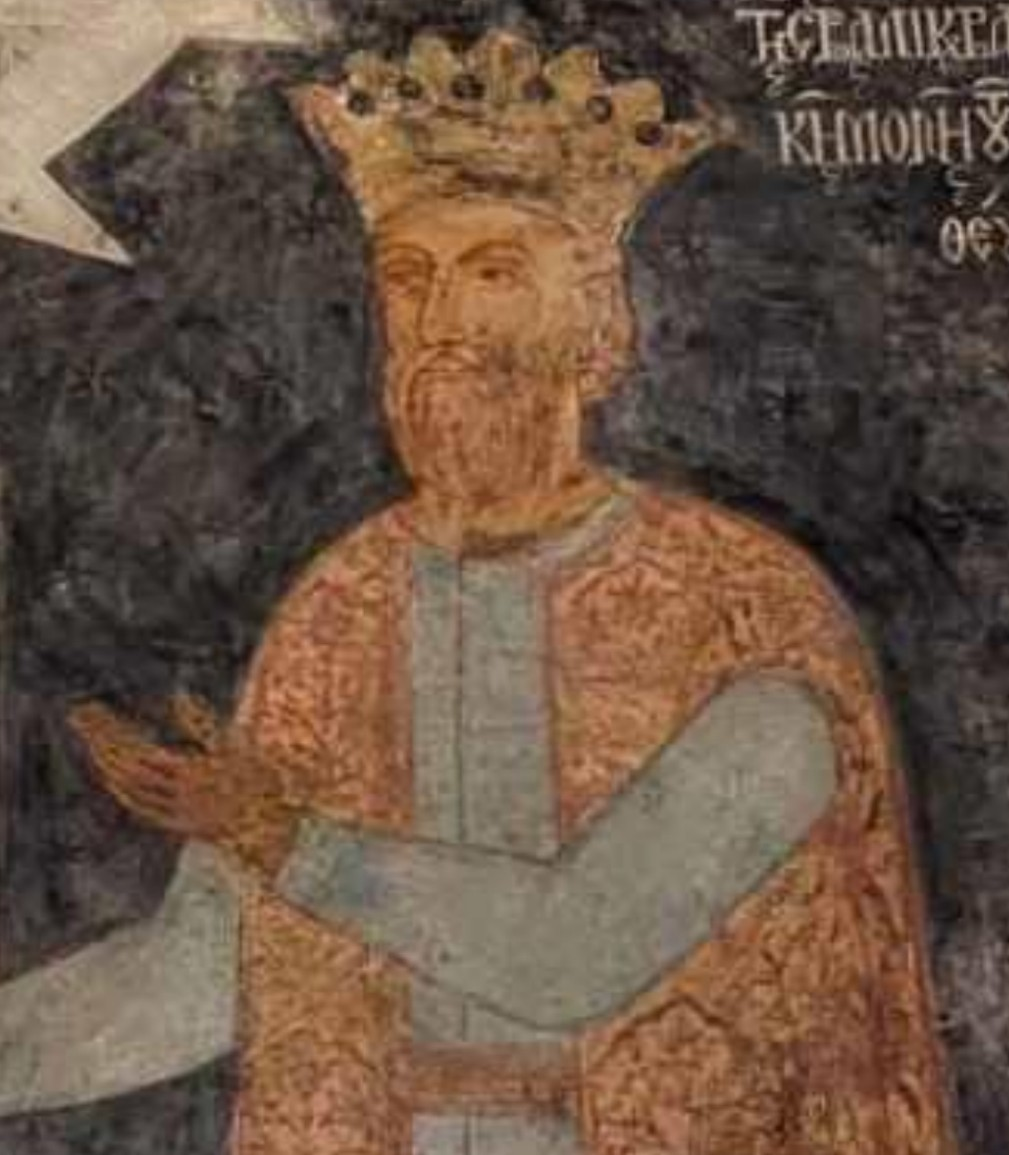
- Fresco of King Alexander II from the Philotheou Monastery, dated between 1561 and 1574.

King of Kakheti
- 1st Reign: 1574 – October 1601
- Predecessor: Levan
- Successor: David I
- 2nd Reign: 21 October 1602 – 12 March 1605
- Predecessor: David I
- Successor: Constantine I
- Born: 1527
- Died: 12 March 1605 (aged 77–78); Dzegami
- Spouse: Tinatin Amilakhvari; Tamar
- Issue Among others: Prince Heraclius; David I of Kakheti; Prince George; Constantine I of Kakheti
- Dynasty: Bagrationi
- Father: Levan of Kakheti
- Mother: Tinatin Gurieli
- Religion: Georgian Orthodox Church
- Khelrtva

Alexander II (Georgian: ალექსანდრე II, romanized: aleksandre II; 1527 – March 12, 1605) of the Bagrationi dynasty, was a king (mepe) of Kakheti in eastern Georgia from 1574 to 1605. In spite of a precarious international situation, he managed to retain relative economic stability in his kingdom and tried to establish contacts with the Tsardom of Russia. Alexander fell victim to the Iran-sponsored coup led by his own son, Constantine I.

== Early reign and political alliances ==
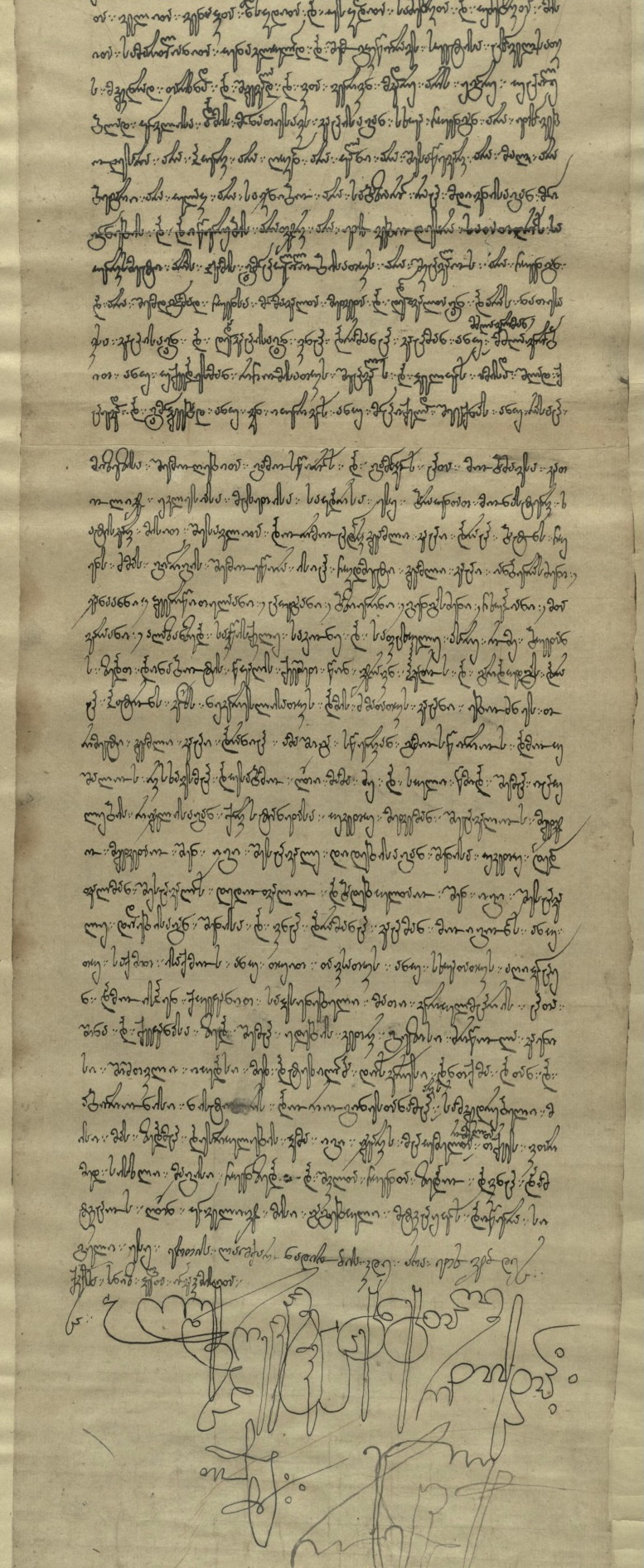
Royal charter of Alexander II.

Alexander was a son of King Levan of Kakheti by his first wife Tinatin Gurieli. Upon Levan's death in 1574, Alexander secured his succession in a power struggle with his half-brothers – El-Mirza and Kaikhosro – and their party. He was aided by his kinsman and western neighbor, David XI, who sent auxiliary troops under the princes Bardzim Amilakhvari and Elizbar of the Ksani, and helped Alexander crush the opponents at the Battle of Torgi.

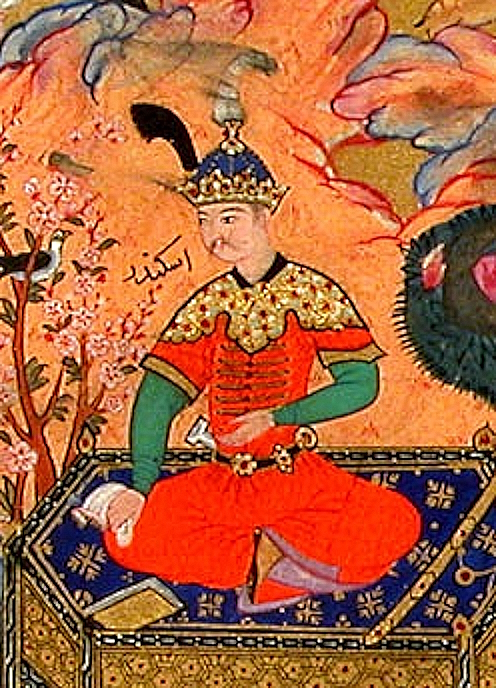
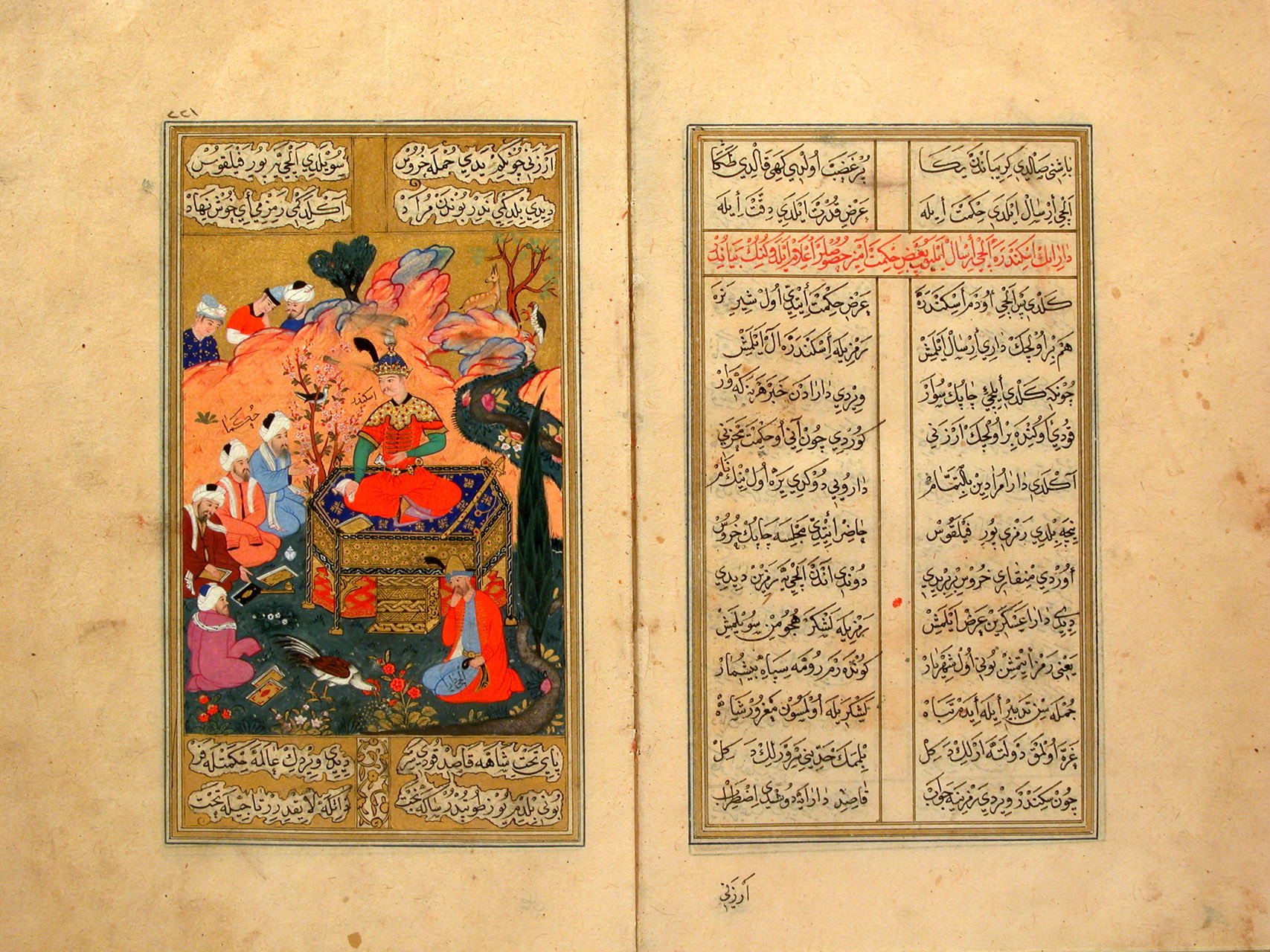
Alexander ("Iskander") II, enthroned in a 1598 miniature from the Secaatname.

Alexander II continued a traditional policy of his predecessors aimed at keeping peace with the neighbors of Kakheti. This, for the time being, secured the economic stability and prosperity in the kingdom. However, he faced a difficult task of maneuvering between the Ottomans and Safavid Iran as both empires vied for the hegemony in the Caucasus. Although Alexander was initially a vassal, at least nominally, of the Safavids, he repudiated his allegiance to the Shah of Iran and accepted the Ottoman suzerainty when the latter empire gained the upper hand in 1578. The move did not prevent, however, Kakheti from being attacked by the mountainous subjects of the Shamkhal of Tarki who was apparently instigated by the Ottoman agents. Alexander decided to resume his father's efforts to establish alliance with the Tsardom of Russia. After exchanging ambassadors in 1586–1587, Alexander received the protection of Tsar Feodor I of Russia, signing the Book of Pledge in 1589. Russian troops were sent against the shamkhal in a brief campaign of 1592. Little else came of the Russian promises, leading to a series of complaints by Alexander to the tsar's ambassadors.

Between 1596 and 1597, envoys of Alexander II, Simon I of Kartli, and Manuchehr of Samtshke arrived at the Safavid court, including slave boys and girls, who were entertained by Prince Constantine (also known as Kunstandil), the son of Alexander II himself, who had been brought up at the Safavid court.

=== War with Kabardians ===
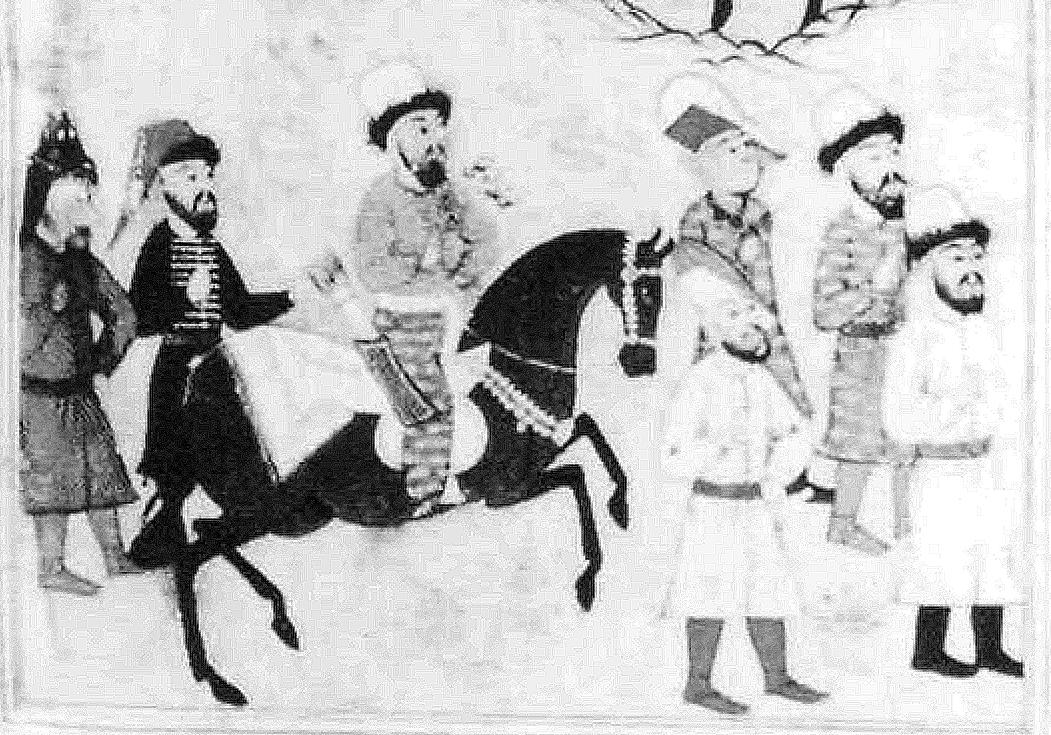
Alexander II of Kakheti with his Georgian troops at the conquest of Sheki in Shirvan with the Ottomans on 10 September 1578. Nusretname, Topkapi, H.1365

In 1596, Kabardian forces led by princes Solokh and Aitek-Murza advanced through the Daryal Gorge, seizing fortified settlements (’‘kabaki’’) belonging to the Ingush noble Sultan-Murza. After establishing control in the highlands, they moved southward into Kartli's mountainous borderlands, specifically targeting the Sioni and Ksani regions.

The same report noted that another Kabardian noble, referred to as “Gosudar Alkas,” had warned King Alexander about Solokh's actions and even released many of the captives taken during the raid. In retaliation, Solokh attempted to incite Russian voivodes stationed in Terek to join him in military action against Alkas.

In response, Alexander sent a letter to the Russian commanders urging them not to act against Alkas. He assured them that if Alkas had offended the Russian Tsar in any way, he would soon “correct his mistake, fully submit to the Tsar, and remain eternally loyal.”

== Downfall ==
In October 1601, Alexander's son, David, revolted from the royal authority and seized the crown, forcing his father to retire to a monastery. David died a year later, on October 2, 1602, and Alexander was able to resume the throne. Meanwhile, Iran started to regain what had earlier been lost to the Ottomans. The energetic Shah Abbas I laid a siege to the Ottoman-held fortress of Erivan in November 1603 and summoned Alexander to his headquarters. After months of hesitation, Alexander acceded, massacred the Ottoman garrison in Tiflis, and arrived at Erivan in April 1604. Early in 1605, Shah Abbas sent him back with orders to raid Shirvan. He was accompanied by his son, Constantine, who had been raised at the Safavid court as a convert to Islam.

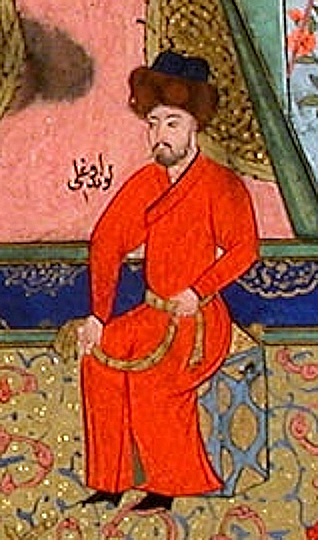
Alexander II of Kakheti (Levend-oğlu, لوند اوغلی, "Son of Levan"), in the presence of Ottoman ruler Lala Mustafa Pasha. Şeca'atname (1586).

Back in Kakheti, Alexander found a new Russian embassy requesting his support in a projected campaign against the shamkhal. The Russian envoys had already been favorably received by Alexander's son, George, who ran the kingdom in his father's absence. Dissatisfied by this maneuver, Constantine demanded the loyal execution of the shah's orders. On March 12, 1605, Alexander summoned a council at Zagem. Within hours, Constantine led his Qizilbash entourage into a bloody coup against his own father; Alexander, George and several of their nobles were massacred. Constantine was made by the shah king of Kakheti, and the Safavid suzerainty was, for the time being, reasserted in the kingdom.

== Family ==
Alexander II was married to Tinatin (died 1594), daughter of Prince Bardzim Amilakhvari, who bore him six sons and three daughters. He probably married secondly to a certain Tamar (fl. 1578–1585). The children of Alexander were:

- Prince Heraclius (died 1589), who died in Istanbul;
- David I of Kakheti (died 1602), King of Kakheti (r. 1601–1602);
- Prince George (died 1605), who was killed with his father;
- Constantine I of Kakheti (1566–1605), who murdered his father and brother George and ruled Kakheti for six months before being killed during the Kakhetian uprising;
- Prince Anton (fl. 1578–1590);
- Prince Rostom (fl. 1569–1579);
- Princess Nestan-Darejan (died 1591 or 1597), who married Manuchar I Dadiani, Prince of Mingrelia. Their son, Levan II Dadiani, was raised by Alexander II;
- Princess Ana (died 1619), who married Bagrat VII;
- An unnamed daughter, who married Hamza Mirza, elder brother of Shah Abbas I.

== Ancestry ==
Ancestors of Alexander II of Kakheti

8. Alexander I of Kakheti
4. George II of Kakheti
9. Nestan-Darejan N.
2. Levan of Kakheti
10. Garsevan Cholokashvili
5. Ana Cholokashvili
1. Alexander II
12. Giorgi I Gurieli
6. Mamia I Gurieli
3. Tinatin Gurieli

== Sources ==
- Blow, David (2009). Shah Abbas: The Ruthless King Who became an Iranian Legend. London, UK: I.B. Tauris & Co. Ltd. ISBN 978-1845119898. LCCN 2009464064.
- Allen, W. E. D. (1970). Russian Embassies to the Georgian Kings, 1589–1605: Volumes I and II. Taylor & Francis. ISBN 978-1-317-06040-6.

Preceded by Levan	King of Kakheti; 1574–October 1601	Succeeded by David I
Preceded by David I	King of Kakheti; 21 October 1602 - 12 march 1605	Succeeded by Constantine I
