= Kingdom of Kakheti =

1466–1762 kingdom in eastern Georgia

Kingdom of Kakheti კახეთის სამეფო
- 1466–1762
- Flag 18th century coat of arms according to Vakhushti

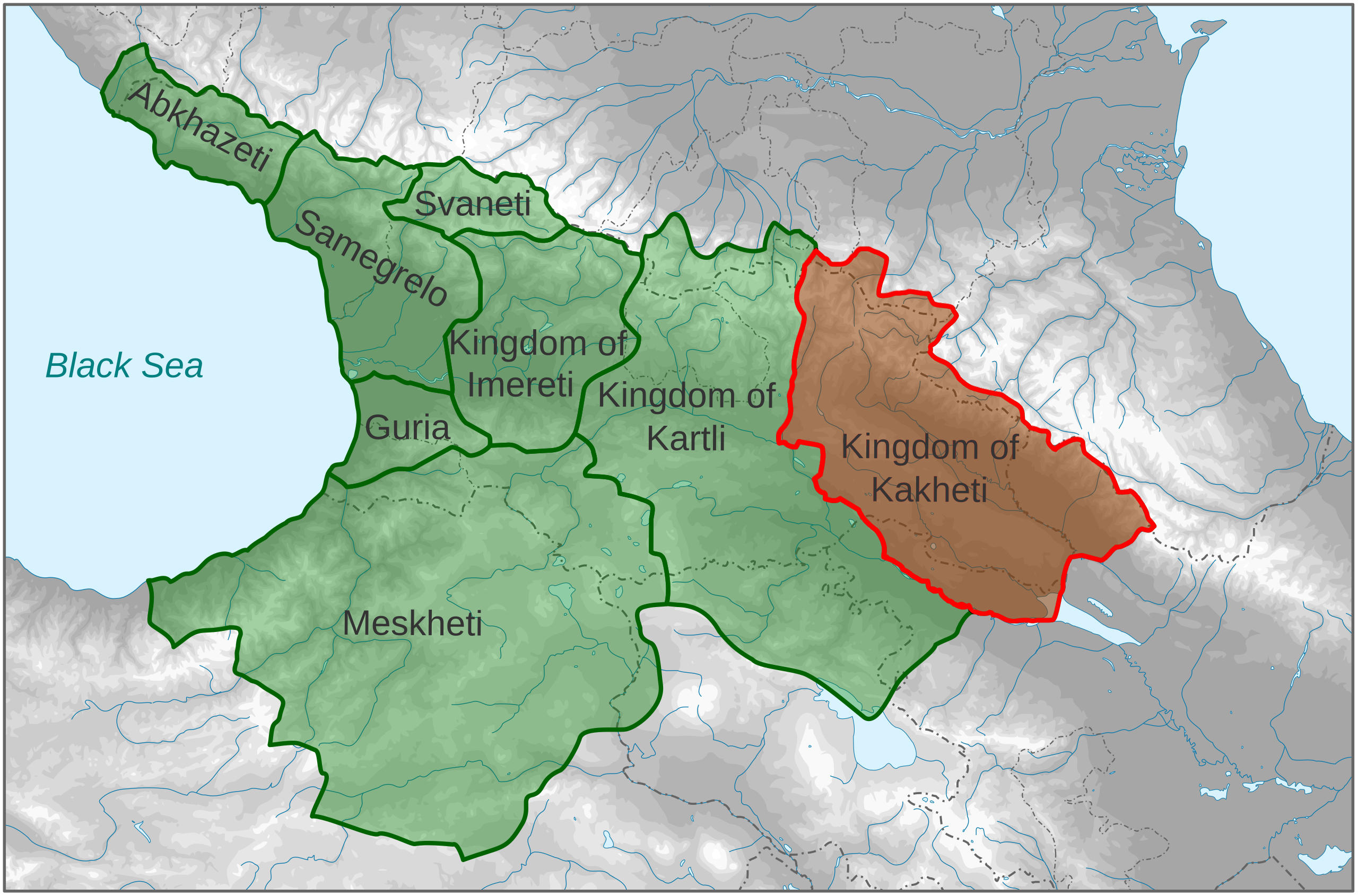
- Kingdom of Kakheti after Georgia's dissolution as a unified state, in 1490
- Status: Kingdom
- Capital: Gremi (1466–1664); Telavi; 41°55′0″N 45°29′0″E
- Common languages: Georgian (numismatics); Persian (numismatics) (Note: "King Vakhtang VI (r. 1716–24), Teimuraz’s successor as ruler of Kartli and resister of the Safavids, continued to imbue his poetry with Persian metaphors and symbols, while his own successor Teimuraz II (r. 1732–44 in Kakheti, 1744–62 in Kartli) translated the tale of Sindbad (as Timsariani) from Persian. Their coinage was also issued with both Georgian and Persian script.")
- Religion: Orthodox Christianity; Judaism; Shia Islam
- Government: Feudal monarchy
- King
  - 1466–1476: George I (first)
  - 1744–1762: Heraclius II (last)
- History
  - Established: 1466
  - Georgia (Kartli) recognizes independence: 1490
  - Vassal state of Persia: 1555–1578; 1612–1723; 1736–1747
  - Vassal state of Ottoman Empire: 1578–1612; 1723–1736
  - Union of Kartli and Kakheti: 1762
Preceded by	Succeeded by
Kingdom of Georgia	Kingdom of Kartli-Kakheti; Elisu Sultanate
- Today part of: Armenia; Azerbaijan; Georgia; Russia

The Kingdom of Kakheti (Georgian: კახეთის სამეფო, romanized: k'akhetis samepo; also spelled Kaxet'i or Kakhetia) was a late medieval and early modern monarchy in eastern Georgia, centered at the province of Kakheti, with its capital first at Gremi and then at Telavi. It emerged in the process of a tripartite division of the Kingdom of Georgia in 1466 and existed, with several brief intermissions, until 1762 when Kakheti and the neighboring Georgian kingdom of Kartli were merged through a dynastic succession under the Kakhetian branch of the Bagrationi dynasty. Through much of this period, the kingdom was a vassal of the successive dynasties of Iran, and to a much shorter period Ottoman Empire, (Note: "On 7 August 1578 Lala Paşa’s army started moving down the left bank of the Kura; ... Lala Paşa then turned east, towards Shirvan. When the Ottoman army reached the Kartli–Kakhetia border at Sartichala on the river Iori, King Aleksandre II of Kakhetia met them in his new role as an Ottoman vassal. As a reward, Aleksandre’s son Erekle was made Ottoman governor of Shaki in Azerbaijan, and the king himself was granted the title of Beglarbeg. The fee was an annual tribute of 30 bales of silk, twenty young men and women, ten falcons and ten goshawks. (p.176). ... In 1590 the Iranians signed a peace treaty conceding virtually all Georgia, Armenia and Azerbaijan to the Ottomans. (p.179). ... In spring 1723 Konstantine used Iranian soldiers to capture Tbilisi; Vakhtang fled to Tskhinvali. The Paşa of Erzurum told Vakhtang to submit to the sultan, if he wanted to be king of Kartli: the darbazi advised capitulation. Second Lieutenant Tolstoi still insisted that Tsar Peter was coming; Vakhtang merely pretended to accept the sultan’s terms. On 12 June an Ottoman army bloodlessly took Tbilisi from Konstantine. Vakhtang bribed the Ottoman commander Ibrahim Paşa to disarm Konstantine and install Vakhtang’s son Bakar as Kartli’s governor. For a few weeks Bakar and Konstantine both resisted the Ottomans, but soon fled, Konstantine eventually converting to Islam and becoming Ottoman vassal king of Kakhetia. (p.227).") but enjoyed intermittent periods of greater independence, especially after 1747.

== Revival of the Kingdom ==
The reemergence of the Kingdom of Kakheti was the first step towards the partition of Georgia which had been embroiled in fratricidal wars since the mid-15th century. This took place after King George VIII, himself a usurper to the throne of Georgia, was captured by his defiant vassal Qvarqvare III, Duke of Samtskhe, in 1465, and dethroned in favor of Bagrat VI. He then set himself up as an independent ruler in his former princely appanage of Kakheti, the easternmost province of Georgia centered on the river valleys of Alazani and Iori, where he remained, a sort of anti-king, till his death in 1476. Overwhelmed by these difficulties, Constantine II, king of a reduced Georgia, was obliged to sanction the new order of things. He recognized in 1490 Alexander I, son of George VIII, as King of Kakheti in the east, and in 1491 Alexander II, son of Bagrat VI, as King of Imereti in the west, leaving himself in control of Kartli. In this way, the tripartite division of the Kingdom of Georgia was consummated.

== Brief annexation by Kartli ==
Following the death of George II, who had staged numerous incursions into the neighboring Kingdom of Kartli, Kakheti was left weakened and annexed by Kartli. However his son, Levan of Kakheti, was taken covertly to the Kakhetian mountains at the age of 9 to prevent him from being captured by the Kartlians. Following the invasion of Kartli by Ismail I, Shah of Iran, the nobles who had brought Levan to the mountains saw an opportunity, and declared Levan King of Kakheti. Following a 2-year war, Kartli rescinded control over Kakheti and recognized the nation's independence.

== Kakheti in the 16th century ==
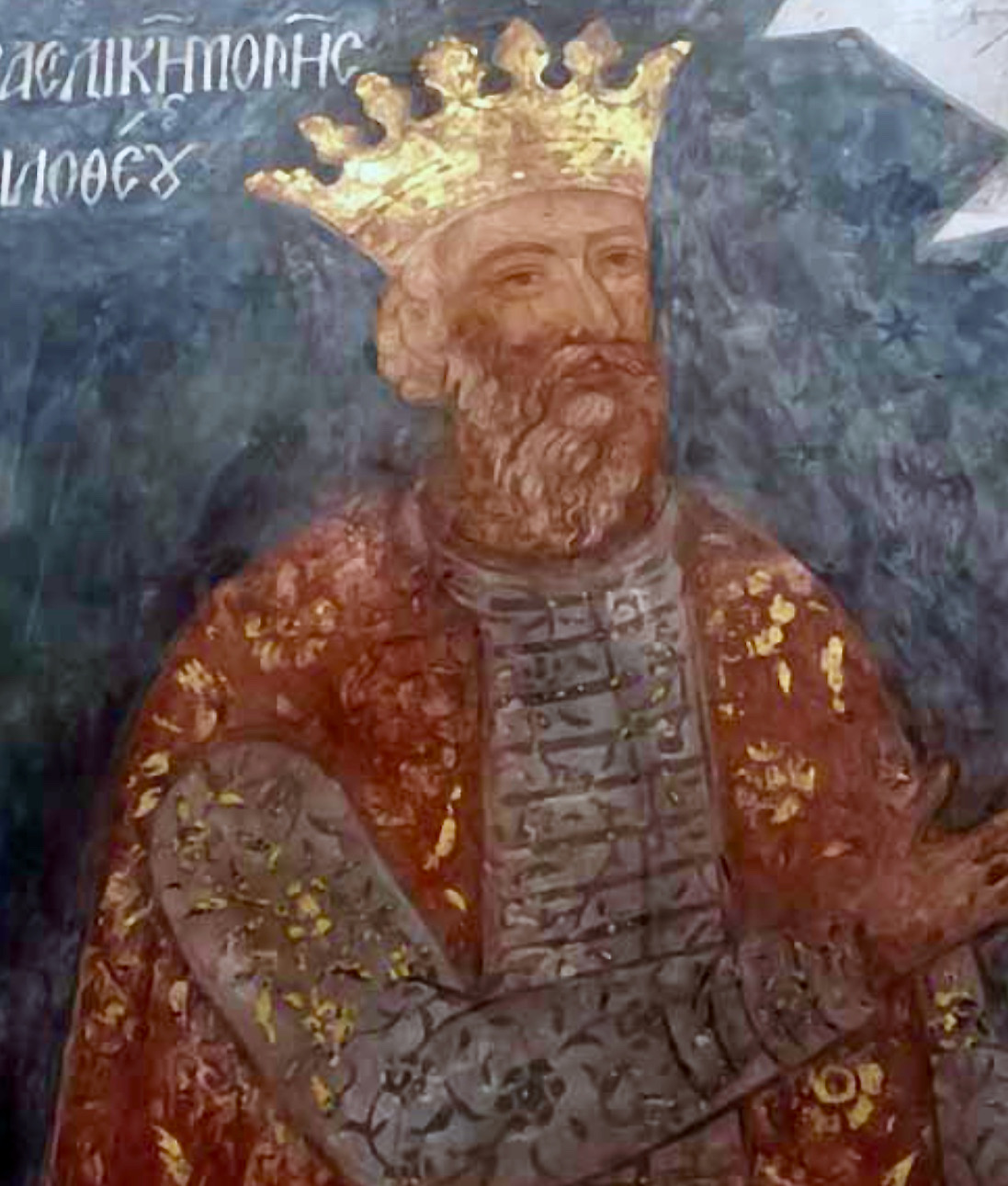
King Levan presided over the most prosperous period in the history of the Kakhetian realm

Unlike other Georgian polities, Kakheti was spared, for the time being, from major foreign incursions and significant internal unrest. Furthermore, it had the advantage over other parts of Georgia of flanking the important Ghilan-Shemakha-Astrakhan “silk route.” The Kakhetian government sponsored this trade and actively participated in it, closely tying the kingdom to the economic life of eastern Transcaucasia and Iran. The extensively cultivated fertile lands of Kakheti combined with vibrant Jewish, Armenian and Persian colonies in the trading towns of Gremi, Zagemi, Karagaji, and Telavi, resulted in prosperity, not observable in other parts of a fragmentized Georgia. This relative stability for a time strengthened the monarch's power and increased the number of his supporters among the nobility.

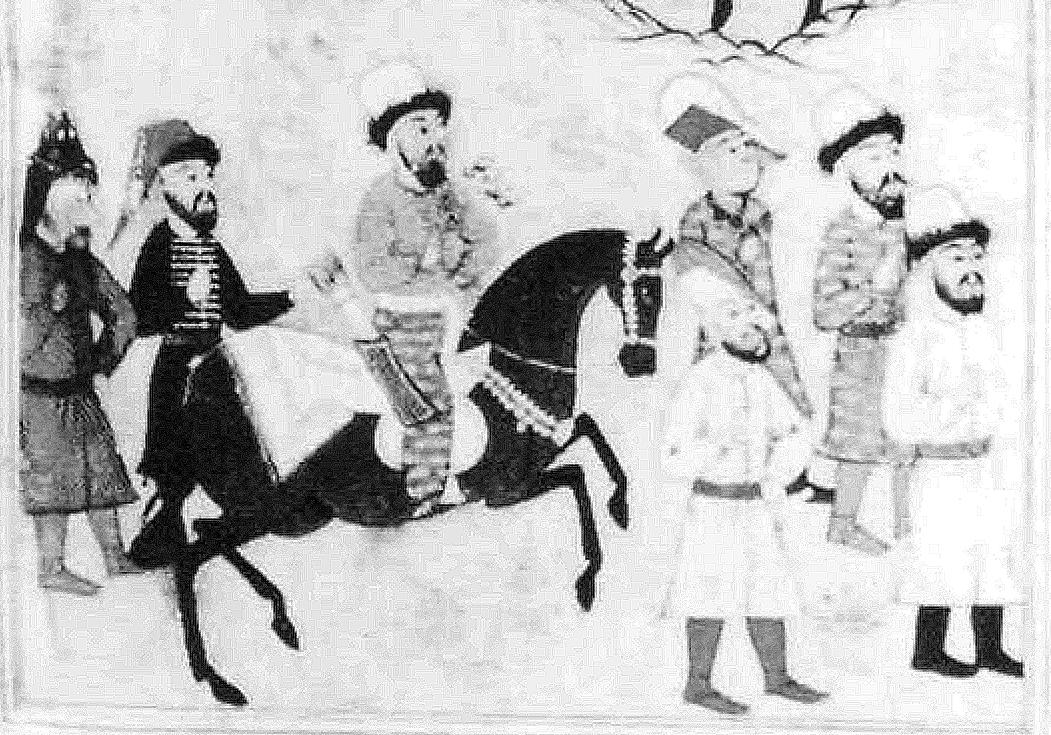
Alexander II of Kakheti with his Georgian troops at the conquest of Sheki in Shirvan with the Ottomans on 10 September 1578. Nusretname, Topkapi, H.1365

Threatened by the emerging Ottoman and Safavid empires, the kings of Kakheti persuaded a carefully staged politics of balance, and tried to establish an alliance with the co-religionist rulers of Muscovy against the shamkhals of Tarki in the North Caucasus. An Ottoman-Safavid peace deal at Amasya in 1555 left Kakheti within the sphere of Safavid Iranian influence, but the local rulers still maintained considerable independence and stability by showing willingness to cooperate with their Safavid overlords. Nevertheless, in 1589, Alexander II of Kakheti officially pledged his allegiance to Tsar Feodor I of Russia, but the alliance was never actually implemented in practice. With Alexander's murder in an Iranian-sponsored coup staged by his own son, a Muslim convert Constantine I, in 1605, the fortunes of Kakheti began to reverse. The people of Kakheti refused to accept the patricide and overthrew him, forcing the energetic Safavid shah Abbas I to reluctantly recognize the rebels’ nominee and Constantine's nephew Teimuraz I as a new king in 1605. Thus began Teimuraz's long and difficult reign (1605–1648) in conflict with the Safavids.

== Iranian hegemony ==
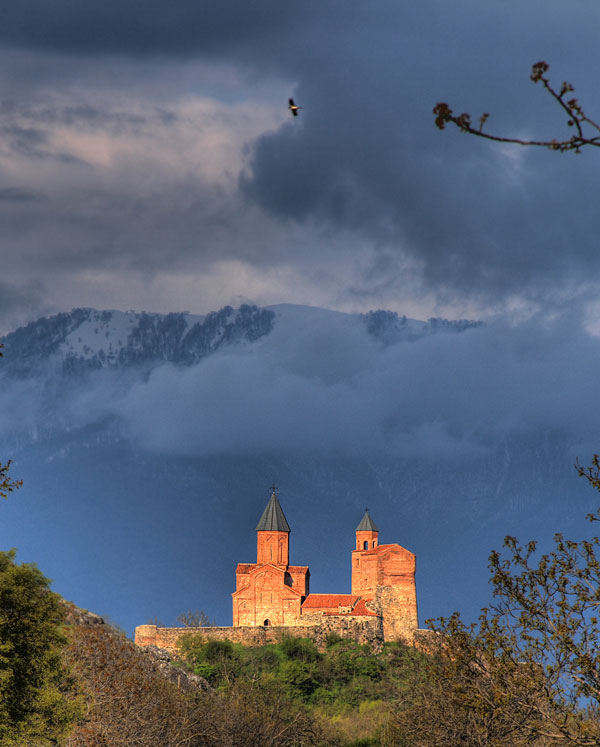
The ruins of a royal castle at Gremi.

In the mid-1610s, Shah Abbas I renewed his effort to bring Georgia more completely into the Safavid empire and subjected Kakheti to repeated invasions in 1614, 1615 and 1616. In a series of Georgian insurrections and Iranian reprisals, sixty to seventy thousand people were killed, and more than one hundred thousand Kakhetian peasants were forcibly deported into Iran. The population of Kakheti dropped by two-thirds; once flourishing towns, like Gremi and Zagemi, shrank to insignificant villages; agriculture declined and commerce came to a standstill. By 1648, the indefatigable Taimuraz had finally been ousted from Kakheti. Kakheti was subsequently put under the rule of Rostom (Rostam Khan), the vali of Kartli. However Rostom's rule was only nominal, for real power in Kakheti was in the hands of Iranian governors appointed by the Shah. The Safavid government tightened its control of Kakheti, implemented a policy of replacing the native population with nomadic Turkic tribes. At the same time, the Dagestani mountaineers started to attack and colonize the Kakhetian marchlands.

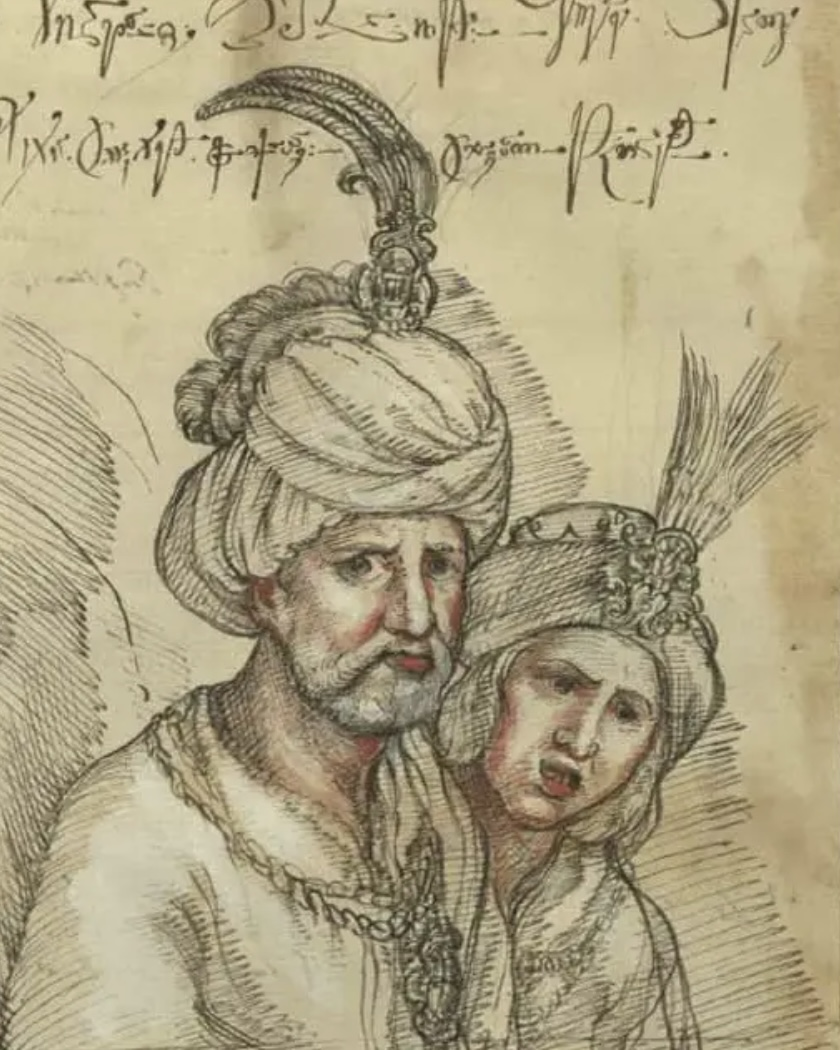
Teimuraz I of Kakheti and his wife Khoreshan. A sketch from the album of the contemporaneous Roman Catholic missionary Cristoforo Castelli.

In 1659, Kakhetians staged a general uprising, thwarting Safavid plans to settle tens of thousands of Turkomans in Kakheti. Yet, Kakheti remained under Iran's political control; the three aristocratic leaders of the uprising surrendered and were executed. Some years later, Vakhtang V, a Muslim Georgian king/vali of Kartli, managed to obtain the shah's permission to install his son Archil as king/vali in Kakheti. For a time, the two kingdoms of eastern Georgia were virtually united under Shah-Nawaz and his son, and a period of relative peace ensued. Making the town of Telavi his capital, in place of Gremi which was ruined by the Iranian invasions, Archil set out to implement a program of reconstruction. However, the promising situation was of short duration. Archil's ascension in Kakheti marked the beginning of a rivalry between the two Bagrationi branches – the Mukhrani, to which Archil belonged, and the House of Kakheti, dispossessed of the crown in the person of Teimuraz I.

From 1677 to 1703, the Bagrationi dynasty lost control of the Kakhetian throne, and Kakheti once again came under direct Safavid rule. The House of Kakheti finally succeeded, at the expense of their apostasy to Islam, in reestablishing themselves in 1703, and ruled, henceforth, at the pleasure of their Safavid suzerains. This proved to be of little benefit, however, and the kingdom continued to be plagued by the incessant Dagestani inroads.

From 1724 to 1744, Kakheti was subjected to the successive Ottoman and Iranian occupations. However, the service rendered by the Kakhetian prince Teimuraz II to Nader Shah of Iran in the struggle against the Ottomans resulted in an annulment of heavy tribute paid by Kakheti to the Iranian court in 1743. In 1744, as a reward for their loyalty, Nader granted the kingship of Kartli to Teimuraz II and that of Kartli to his son Erekle II. Both monarchs were crowned in accordance to a Christian tradition in 1745. They exploited the turmoil in Iran that followed Nader's assassination in 1747 and established themselves as virtually independent rulers. Their rule helped to stabilize the country; economy began to revive, and the Dagestani attacks were reduced, but not eliminated. When Teimuraz died on January 8, 1762, Erekle succeeded him, thus uniting eastern Georgia as a single state for the first time in nearly three centuries, in the form of the Kingdom of Kartli-Kakheti.

== See also ==
- List of monarchs of Kakheti
- Kakheti kings family tree
