= List of Georgian royal consorts =

List of Georgian consorts

This is a list of the royal consorts of Georgia from 302 BCE–20 February 1810.

== Queen consort of the Kingdom of Iberia (302 BC–580) ==
Name	Father	Birth	Marriage	Became Consort	Ceased to be Consort	Death	Spouse
Durdzuk woman	-	-	-	-	234 BC husband's death	-	Pharnavaz I
Persian woman	-	Barda	-	-	159 BC husband's death	-	Sauromaces I
Royal princess	Sauromaces I (Pharnavazid)	-	-	-	109 BC husband's death	-	Mirian I
Royal princess	Mirian I (Pharnavazid)	-	-	-	78 BC husband's death	-	Artaxias I
Parthian woman	-	-	-	-	30 BC husband's death	-	Pharnavaz II
Parthian woman	-	-	30 BC		20 BC husband's death	-	Mirian II
Royal princess	Tigranes IV	-	-	-	58 AD husband's death	-	Pharasmanes I
Ghadana	Vologases III	-	-	-	132 husband's death	-	Pharasmanes II
Drakontis	Vologases?	-	-	-	189 husband's death	-	Amazasp II
Sephelia; Greek princess	-	-	-	-	216 husband's death	-	Rev I
Abeshura	Aspacures I (Pharnavazid)	-	-	-	292		Mirian III
Nana	Theothorses	-	-	-	361 husband's death	-	Mirian III
Salome	Tiridates III	-	-	-	-	-	Rev II
Royal princess	Trdat (Chosroid)	-	-	-	394 husband's death	-	Aspacures III
Maria; Greek princess and relative of Emperor Jovian	-	-	-	-	435 husband's death	-	Archil
Sagdukht	Barzabod (Mihranids)	-	-	-	447 husband's death	-	Mihrdat V
Balendukht	Hormizd III (Sasanids)	-	-	-	-	-	Vakhtang I
Elene; Roman woman	-	-	-	-	522 husband's death	-	Vakhtang I

== Queen consort of the Principality of Iberia and Kingdom of the Iberians (580–1008) ==
Name	Father	Birth	Marriage	Became Consort	Ceased to be Consort	Death	Spouse
When king Bacurius III of Iberia died in 580, the Sassanid king Hormizd IV seized on the opportunity to abolish the monarchy of Iberia. The heirs of the royal dynasty withdrew to their highland fortresses. Later they were recognized as the presiding princes of Iberia what resulted the restoration of kingship in 888 by Adarnase IV of Iberia.
Armenian princess	- (Kamsarakan)	-	-	-	684 husband's death	-	Adarnase II; Presiding prince
Georgian noblewoman	-	-	-	-	760 husband's death	-	Adarnase III; Presiding prince
Royal princess	Guaram III (Guaramids)	-	-	-	786 husband's death	-	Archil; Presiding prince
Latavri	Adarnase I (Bagrationi)	-	790		807 husband's death	-	Juansher; Presiding prince
Armenian princess	Smbat VIII (Bagratuni)	-	-	-	876 husband's death	-	Bagrat I Presiding prince
Gurandukht	George II (Anchabadze)	-	-	-	1008 husband's death	-	Gurgen
After the death of Gurgen, his son Bagrat III became a first king of the united Kingdom of Georgia.

== Queen consort or King consort of the Kingdom of Georgia (1008–1490) ==
Name	Father	Birth	Marriage	Became Consort	Ceased to be Consort	Death	Spouse
Martha	-	-	-	1008 unification of Georgia	7 May 1014 husband's death	-	Bagrat III
Mariam of Vaspurakan	Senekerim-Hovhannes Artsruni, King of Vaspurakan (Artsruni)	-	before 1018	7 May 1014 husband's accession	- divorce	between 1072 and 1103	George I
Alda of Alania	A King of Alania (Tsarazon)	-	after her husband's divorce with first wife		16 August 1027 husband's death	after 1042	George I
Helena Argyre	Basil Argyros (Argyros)	-	1033		1034		Bagrat IV
Borena of Alania	A King of Alania (Tsarazon)	-	1034–1040		24 November 1072 husband's death	after 1072	Bagrat IV
Elene (Helen)	-	-	-	24 November 1072 husband's accession	1089 husband's abdication	-	George II
Rusudan	-	-	-	1089 husband's accession	1107 divorce	-	David IV
Gurandukht	Otrok Khan of the Kipchaks (Sarukhanids)	-	1107		24 January 1125 husband's death	-	David IV
The name of Demetrius I's wife is unknown, but he had several children
Burdukhan of Alania	Khuddan, King of Alania (Tsarazon)	-	1155	1156 husband's accession	27 March 1184 husband's death	-	George III
Yury Bogolyubsky	Andrey Bogolyubsky (Rurik)	-	1185		1187 divorce	after 1191	Tamar
David Soslan	Jadaroni	-	1189		1207		Tamar
Ghias ad-Din	Tughril ibn Kılıç Arslan II, Emir of Erzerum (Saltukids)	-	1224		1245 wife's death	1247	Rusudan
Tamar Amanelisdze	Georgian noble (Amanelisdze)	-	-	1245 husband's accession	before 1254		David VI
Theodora Doukaina Palaiologina	Michael VIII Palaiologos (Palaiologos)	-	1254		1259 became queen of Imereti	-	David VI
Jigda-Khatun		-	-	1247 husband's accession	1252		David VII
Gvantsa Kakhaberidze	Kakhaber IV Kakhaberidze, Duke of Racha and Tavkveri (Kakhaberidze)	-	1252		1262		David VII
Esukan	Chormaqan (Noyan)	-	1268		1269		David VII
Theodora Megale Komnena	Manuel I of Trebizond (Komnenos)	-	1272		after 1280		Demetrius II
Solghar	? (Borjigin)	-	1278		12 March 1289 husband's death	-	Demetrius II
Natela Jaqeli	Beka I Jaqeli, Atabeg of Samtskhe (Jaqeli)	-	1280		12 March 1289 husband's death	-	Demetrius II
Oljath	Abaqa Khan (Borjigin)	-	-	1289 husband's accession	1292 husband's death	before 1302	Vakhtang II
Oljath	Abaqa Khan (Borjigin)	-	1292		before 1302		David VIII
Anonymous	Hamada Surameli (Surameli)	-	1302		1311 husband's death	-	David VIII
Ripsime	-	-	-	1302 husband's accession as rival king	1308 husband's death	-	Vakhtang III
The identity of King George V's wife is not known. The "Georgian Chronicle" of the 18th century reports George V marrying a daughter of "the Greek Emperor, Lord Michael Komnenos". However the reigning dynasty of the Byzantine Empire in the 14th century were the Palaiologoi, not the Komnenoi. The marriage of a daughter of Michael IX Palaiologos and his wife Rita of Armenia to a Georgian ruler is not recorded in Byzantine sources. Neither is the existence of any illegitimate daughters of Michael IX. The Komnenoi did rule however in the Empire of Trebizond. A Michael Komnenos was Emperor from 1344 to 1349. His wife was Acropolitissa. Their only child recorded in primary sources was John III of Trebizond. Whether John III had siblings is unknown.
Sindukhtar Jaqeli	Qvarqvare II Jaqeli, Atabeg of Samtskhe (Jaqeli)	-	-	1346 husband's accession	1360 husband's death	-	David IX
Helen	-	-	-	1360 husband's accession	1366		Bagrat V
Anna of Trebizond	Alexios III of Trebizond (Komnenos)	6 April 1357	June 1367		1393 husband's death	after 1406	Bagrat V
Nestan-Darejan	-	-	-	1393 husband's accession	1407 husband's death	-	George VII
Natia Amirejibi	Kutsna Amirejibi (Amirejibi)	-	-	1407 husband's accession	1412 husband's death	-	Constantine I
Dulandukht Orbelian	Beshken II Orbelian (Orbelian)	-	1410	1412 husband's accession	before 1414		Alexander I
Tamar of Imereti	Alexander I of Imereti (Bagrationi)	-	1414		1442 husband's death	-	Alexander I
Siti Panaskerteli	Zaza Panaskerteli-Tsitsishvili (Panaskerteli)	-	1442		1444		Vakhtang IV
Tamar Jaqeli	Qvarqvare II Jaqeli, Atabeg of Samtskhe (Jaqeli)	-	1445	December 1446 husband's accession	before 1456		George VIII
Nestan-Darejan	-	-	1445		1465 husband's deposition	1510	George VIII
Elene (Helen)	-	-	-	1465 husband regain Georgia	1478 husband's death	3 November 1510	Bagrat VI
Tamar	-	-	1473	1478 husband regain Georgia	1490 husband lost Georgia	1492	Constantine II

Georgia split into three independent kingdoms by 1490. The Kings of Kartli were descendants of Constantine II, the Kings of Kakheti from George VIII and the Kings of Imereti from Bagrat VI.

== Queen consort of the Kingdom of Kartli (1484–1762) ==
Name	Father	Birth	Marriage	Became Consort	Ceased to be Consort	Death	Spouse
Tamar	-	-	1473	1490 husband recognizes Kakheti and Imereti	1492		Constantine II
Mirangul Baratashvili	David Jambakur Katchibadze Baratashvili, Prince of Gareja (Baratashvili)	-	-	27 April 1505 husband's accession	1525 husband's abdication	1556	David X
Gulchari	-	-	-	1525 husband's accession	1527 husband's abdication	-	George IX
Tamar of Imereti	Bagrat III of Imereti (Bagrationi)	-	25 March 1526	1527 husband's accession	1556 husband's death	1556	Luarsab I
Nestan-Darejan of Kakheti	Levan of Kakheti (Bagrationi)	-	1559	1556 husband's accession	1569 husband's imprisonation	-	Simon I
Elene (Helen)	-	-	-	1569 husband's accession	1578 husband flee from Georgia	-	David XI (Daud Khan)
Nestan-Darejan of Kakheti	Levan of Kakheti (Bagrationi)	-	1559	1578 husband's restoration	1600 husband's imprisonation	-	Simon I
Tamar Lipartiani	Giorgi Lipartiani	-	15 September 1578	1600 husband's accession	7 September 1606 husband's death	after 1610	George X
Makrine Saakadze	Prince Siaush Saakadze (Saakadze)	-	1610		around 1612 divorce	after 1612	Luarsab II
Anna of Kakheti	Alexander II of Kakheti (Bagrationi)	-	-	1616 husband's accession	1619 husband's death	1619	Bagrat VII
Jahan Banu Begum	Isa Khan Sheykhavand	-	1626		1631 husband's death	-	Simon II
Khoreshan of Kartli	George X (Bagrationi)	-	1612	1625 husband's accession in rivalry with Simon II and Rostom	1633 husband's deposition	1659	Teimuraz I
Ketevan Abashishvili	Gorjasp Abashishvili	-	1633		1633		Rostom
Mariam Dadiani	Manuchar I Dadiani, Prince of Mingrelia (Dadiani)	1599/1609	1634		17 November 1658 husband's death	1682	Rostom
Rodam Kaplanishvili Orbeliani	Qaplan Baratashvili-Orbelishvili	-	-	17 November 1658 husband's accession	1659 divorce	1691	Vakhtang V
Mariam Dadiani	Manuchar I Dadiani, Prince of Mingrelia (Dadiani)	1599/1609	1659		1676 husband's death	1682	Vakhtang V
Tamar Davitashvili	Prince David Davitashvili	-	-		4 December 1683		George XI
Khoreshan Mikeladze	Prince Giorgi Mikeladze (Mikeladze)	-	1687		1688 husband's deposition	24 February 1695	George XI
Ana Cholokashvili	Prince Irubakidze (Cholokashvili)	-	1677	1688 husband's accession	1703 husband's deposition	before April 1716	Heraclius I
Ketevan	-	-	-	-	27 October 1711 husband's death	3 May 1730	Kaikhosro
Interregnum 1711–1714
Elene of Kakheti	Heraclius I of Kakheti (Bagrationi)	1687	1715		June 1716 husband's deposition	27 April 1750	Jesse
Rusudan of Circassia	Kilchiko, Prince of Lessr Kabarda (?) (Misostov?)	-	1696	June 1716 husband's accession	1724 husband fled	30 December 1740	Vakhtang VI
Elene of Kakheti	Heraclius I of Kakheti (Bagrationi)	1687	1715	1724 husband's restoration	1727 husband's death	27 April 1750	Jesse
Upon Jesse's death, Kartli was annexed to the Ottoman Empire but with help from the Persians, Kartli was given to the King Teimuraz II who in turn relinquished Kakheti to his son Heraclius II. The two kingdom will only be fully united under Heraclius II.
Tamar of Kartli	Vakhtang VI (Bagrationi)	1696	1712	1744			Teimuraz II
Ana Baratashvili	Prince Bejan Baratashvili (Baratashvili)	1784	19 August 1746		8 January 1762 husband's death	1784	Teimuraz II

Upon Teimuraz II's death, Kartli and Kakheti were united once more with the exception of Imereti.

== Queen consort of the Kingdom of Kakheti (1490–1762) ==
Name	Father	Birth	Marriage	Became Consort	Ceased to be Consort	Death	Spouse
Nestan-Darejan	-	-	1456	1465 husband's deposition as King of Georgia	1476 husband's death	1510	George VIII (George I)
Ana Cholokashvili	Garsevan Cholokashvili (Cholokashvili)	-	-	1476 husband's accession	27 April 1511 husband's death	-	Alexander I
Elene (Helen)	? (Cholokashvili)	-	before 1504	27 April 1511 husband's accession	1513 husband's death	-	George II
1513–1518; Annexation by the Kingdom of Kartli
Tinatin Gurieli	Mamia I Gurieli, Prince of Guria (Gurieli)	-	-	1518 husband's restoration	1529 divorce	1591	Levan
unnamed	Kamal Kara-Musel, Shamkhal of Tarku (Shamkhals)	-	1529		1574 husband's death	-	Levan
Tinatin Amilakhvari	Bardzim Amilakhvari, Prince of Samilakhoro (Amilakhvari)	-	-	1574 husband's accession	October 1601 husband's deposition	-	Alexander II (1st reign)
Ketevan the Martyr	Ashotan I, Prince of Mukhrani (Bagrationi)	-	1581	October 1601 husband's accession	2 October 1602 husband's death	13 September 1624	David I
Tinatin Amilakhvari	Bardzim Amilakhvari, Prince of Samilakhoro (Amilakhvari)	-	-	2 October 1602, husband's restoration	12 March 1605 husband's murder	-	Alexander II (2nd reign)
Ana Gurieli	Mamia III Gurieli, Prince of Guria (Gurieli)	-	1607	1606 husband's accession	1610		Teimuraz I
Khoreshan of Kartli	George X (Bagrationi)	-	1612		1616 husband's deposition 1633 husband's deposition 1648 husband's deposition	1659	Teimuraz I
1614–1615; 1616–1623; 1633–1636; Annexation to Persia
1648–1656; Annexation to Kartli by King Rostom who did not use the title of King of Kakheti.
1656–1664; Annexation to Persia
Ketevan of Kakheti	Prince David of Kakheti (Bagrationi)	1648	22 March 1668		1675 husband's defect to Turks	16 April 1719	Archil II (1st reign)
1676–1703; Annexation to Persia
Yatri-Jahan-Begum	Shahrukh-Zadeh, Beylerbey of Erivan (Lezgins)	-	-	1703 husband's accession	2 November 1722 husband's death	-	David II
Perejan-Begum	Fath 'Ali Khan Daghistani, I'timād-ud-Daulah (Lezgins)	-	before 1720	2 November 1722 husband's accession	28 December 1732 husband's death	-	Constantine II
Tamar of Kartli	Vakhtang VI (Bagrationi)	1696	2 February 1712	1732 husband's accession	1744; Kakheti passed to their son	12 April 1746	Teimuraz II
Ketevan Pkheidze	Prince Zaal Pkheidze (Pkheidze)	-	1740	1744 husband's accession	1744		Heraclius II
Anna Abashidze	Prince Zaal Abashidze (Abashidze)	1730	1745		7 December 1749		Heraclius II
Darejan Dadiani	Prince Katsia Dadiani (Dadiani)	20 July 1734	1750		8 January 1762; Unification of Kartli and Kakheti	8 November 1807	Heraclius II

Upon Teimuraz II's death, Kartli and Kakheti were united once more with the exception of Imereti.

== Queen consort of the Kingdom of Kartli-Kakheti (1762–1801) ==
In 1762, the Kingdom of Kartli and the Kingdom of Kakheti were united under one ruler.

Name	Father	Birth	Marriage	Became Consort	Ceased to be Consort	Death	Spouse
Darejan Dadiani	Prince Katsia Dadiani (Dadiani)	20 July 1734	1750	8 January 1762; Unification of Kartli and Kakheti	11 January 1798 husband's death	8 November 1807	Heraclius II
Mariam Tsitsishvili	Prince Giorgi Tsitsishvili (Tsitsishvili)	9 April 1768	13 July 1783	11 January 1798 husband's accession	28 December 1800 husband's death	30 March 1850	George XII

Annexation of Kakheti and Kartli to Russia by Paul I of Russia, 1801.

== Queen consort of the Kingdom of Imereti (1490–1810) ==
Although a vassal kingdom of Imereti was created in 1258, the only queens consort mentioned by names were Theodora Palaiologina, the former Queen of All Georgia, and Ana Orbeliani, wife of Alexander I of Imereti, who was really a Duke of Shorapani and not a king.

Name	Father	Birth	Marriage	Became Consort	Ceased to be Consort	Death	Spouse
Elene (Helen)	-	-	-	1463 husband regain Georgia	1466 becomes Queen of All Georgia	3 November 1510	Bagrat II
Tamar	-	-	1483		12 March 1510		Alexander II
Elene (Helen)	-	-	-	12 March 1510 husband's accession	-		Bagrat III
Rusudan Sharvashidze	Prince Sharvashidze of Abkhazia (Shervashidze)	-	1563	1565 husband's accession	4 August 1578		George II
Tamar Diasamidze	Prince Shermazan Diasamidze (Diasamidze)	-	after 1578		1585 husband's death	after 1586	George II
Marekhi Dadiani	Levan I Dadiani, Prince of Mingrelia (Dadiani)	-	1586		1590 husband's imprisonation	-	Levan
Tinatin Jaqeli	Manuchar II Jaqeli, Atabeg of Samtskhe (Jaqeli)	-	1597		1605 husband's death	1610	Rostom
Tamar	-	-	-	1605 husband's accession	1639 husband's death	after 1639	George III
Darejan of Kakheti	Teimuraz I (Bagrationi)	-	1631	1639 husband's accession	1 March 1660 husband's death	1668	Alexander III
Ketevan of Kakheti	Prince David of Kakheti (Bagrationi)	1648	1660		1660 divorce	16 April 1719	Bagrat IV (1st reign)
Darejan of Kakheti	Teimuraz I (Bagrationi)	-	1661; Darejan chose her husband from the nobility to depose her stepson		1663 husband's deposition	1668	Vakhtang Tchutchunashvili (1st reign)
Tatia of Mukhrani	Constantine I, Prince of Mukhrani (Bagrationi)	-	1663	1663 husband's restoration	1663 divorce	-	Bagrat IV (2nd reign)
Tamar of Mukhrani	Constantine I, Prince of Mukhrani (Bagrationi)	-	1663		1668 husband's deposition	-	Bagrat IV (2nd reign)
Darejan of Kakheti	Teimuraz I (Bagrationi)	-	1661	1668 husband's restoration	1668		Vakhtang Tchutchunashvili (2nd reign)
Tamar of Mukhrani	Constantine I, Prince of Mukhrani (Bagrationi)	-	1663	1669 husband's restoration	1678 husband's deposition and their divorce	-	Bagrat IV (3rd reign)
Ketevan of Kakheti	Prince David of Kakheti (Bagrationi)	1648	22 March 1668	1678 husband's usurpation	1679 husband's deposition	16 April 1719	Archil II (1st reign)
Tamar of Mukhrani	Constantine I, Prince of Mukhrani (Bagrationi)	-	1679	1679 husband's restoration	1681 husband's death	after 1683	Bagrat IV (4th reign)
Darejan of Imereti	Bagrat IV of Imereti (Bagrationi)	-	1677	1681 husband's usurpation	1682 divorce	1695	George III Gurieli
Tamar of Mukhrani	Constantine I, Prince of Mukhrani (Bagrationi)	-	1682		1683 husband's deposition	after 1683	George III Gurieli
Ketevan of Kakheti	Prince David of Kakheti (Bagrationi)	1648	22 March 1668	1690 husband's usurpation	1691 husband's deposition	16 April 1719	Archil II (2nd reign)
Tamar Abashidze	George V of Imereti (Abashidze)	1681	1691		1695 husband's execution	1707/1709	Alexander IV (2nd reign)
Ketevan of Kakheti	Prince David of Kakheti (Bagrationi)	1648	22 March 1668	1695 husband's usurpation	1696 husband's deposition	16 April 1719	Archil II (3rd reign)
Tamar Abashidze	George V of Imereti (Abashidze)	1681	1696		1698 husband's deposition	1707/1709	George IV
Ketevan of Kakheti	Prince David of Kakheti (Bagrationi)	1648	22 March 1668	1698 husband's restoration	1698 husband's deposition	16 April 1719	Archil II (4th reign)
Ana Abashidze	George V of Imereti (Abashidze)	-	1698	1698 husband's accession	1700 divorce	1731	Simon
-	George III Gurieli (Gurieli)	-	1700		1701 husband's assassination	-	Simon
Elene (Helen) Abashidze	George V of Imereti (Abashidze)	-	1698	1701 husband's accession	1702 husband's deposition	after 1772	Mamia III Gurieli (1st reign)
Rodam of Kartli	George XI (Bagrationi)	-	1703	1703 husband's accession	October 1711 husband's deposition	after 1714	George VI (1st reign)
Tamar Chkhetidze	Papuna II Chkhetidze, Duke of Racha (Chkhetidze)	-	1711	October 1711 husband's accession	June 1712 husband's deposition	1715	Mamia III Gurieli (2nd reign)
Rodam of Kartli	George XI (Bagrationi)	-	1703	June 1712 husband's accession	November 1713 husband's deposition	after 1714	George VI (2nd reign)
Tamar Chkhetidze	Papuna II Chkhetidze, Duke of Racha (Chkhetidze)	-	1711	November 1713 husband's accession	5 January 1714 husband's death	1715	Mamia III Gurieli (3rd reign)
Tamar Chkhetidze	Papuna II Chkhetidze, Duke of Racha (Chkhetidze)	-	March 1714		1715		George VI (3rd reign)
Mariam Sharvashidze	? (Sharvashidze)	-	-	1716 husband's accession	1716 husband's deposition	after 1717	George IV Gurieli (1st reign)
Tamar Gurieli	Mamia III Gurieli (Gurieli)	-	1716	1719 husband's accession	22 February 1720 husband's assassination	1742	George VI (4th reign)
Mariam Dadiani	Bezhan Dadiani, Prince of Mingrelia (Dadiani)	-	1721		before December 1732		Alexander V (1st reign)
Tamar Abashidze	Levan Abashidze (Abashidze)	-	23 December 1732		1741 husband's deposition	-	Alexander V (1st reign)
N. Lipartiani	George Lipartiani, Prince of Salipartiano? (Lipartiani)	-		1741 husband's accession	1742 husband's deposition		George VII
Tamar Abashidze	Levan Abashidze (Abashidze)	-	23 December 1732	1742 husband's accession	March 1752 husband's death	-	Alexander V (2nd reign)
Mariam Dadiani	Otia Dadiani, Prince of Mingrelia (Dadiani)	-	1752	March 1752 husband's accession	1766 husband's deposition	1780	Solomon I (1st reign)
Ana Chkhetidze	Rostom I Chkhetidze, Duke of Racha (Chkhetidze)	-		1766 husband's accession	1768 husband's deposition		Teimuraz
Mariam Dadiani	Otia Dadiani, Prince of Mingrelia (Dadiani)	-	1752	March 1752 husband's accession	1766 husband's deposition	1780	Solomon I (2nd reign)
Gulkhan Tsulukidze	Prince Tzslukidze (Tsulukidze)	1730	?		23 April 1784 husband's death	1800	Solomon I (2nd reign)
Ana Orbeliani	Prince Mamuka Jambakurian-Orbeliani (Orbeliani)	17 July 1765	-	4 May 1784 husband's accession	11 June 1789 husband's deposition	4 June 1832	David II
Mariam Dadiani	Katsia II Dadiani, Prince of Mingrelia (Dadiani)	-	1791	11 June 1789 husband's accession	20 February 1810 husband's deposition	18 March 1841	Solomon II

Annexation of Imereti to Russia by Alexander I of Russia, 20 February 1810.

== Gallery ==
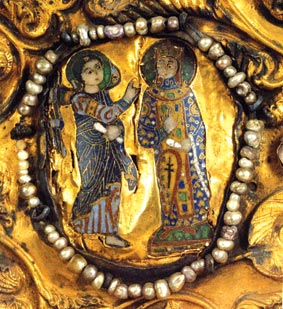
Mariam of Vaspurakan

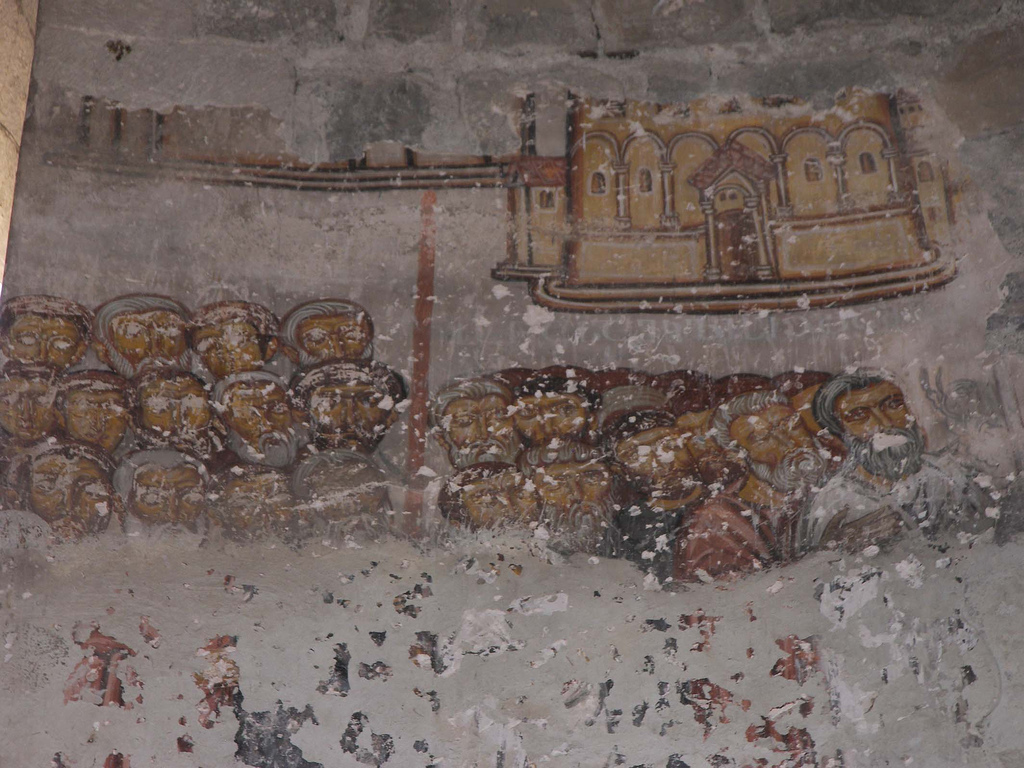
A fresco from Oshki, probably depicting the marriage of Bagrat IV and Elene at Bana

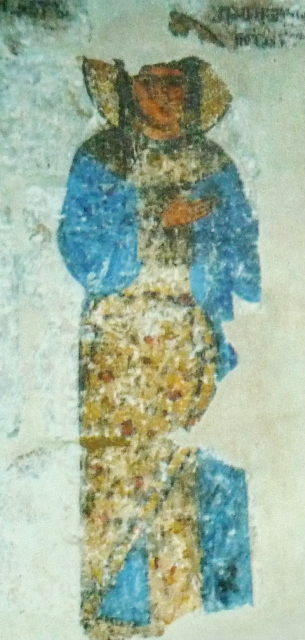
Borena of Alania

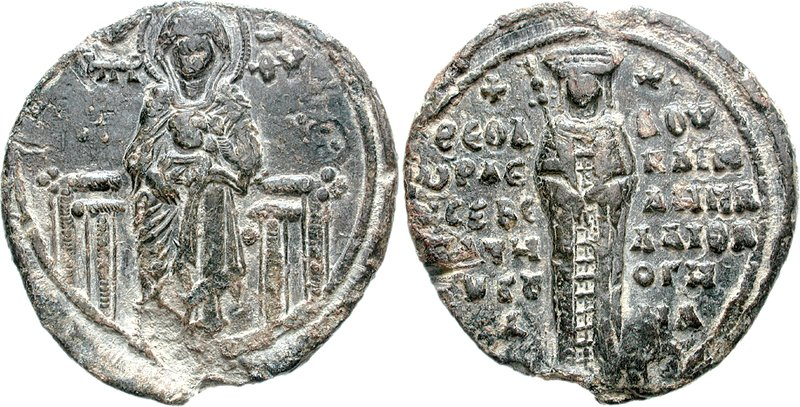
Theodora Doukaina Palaiologina

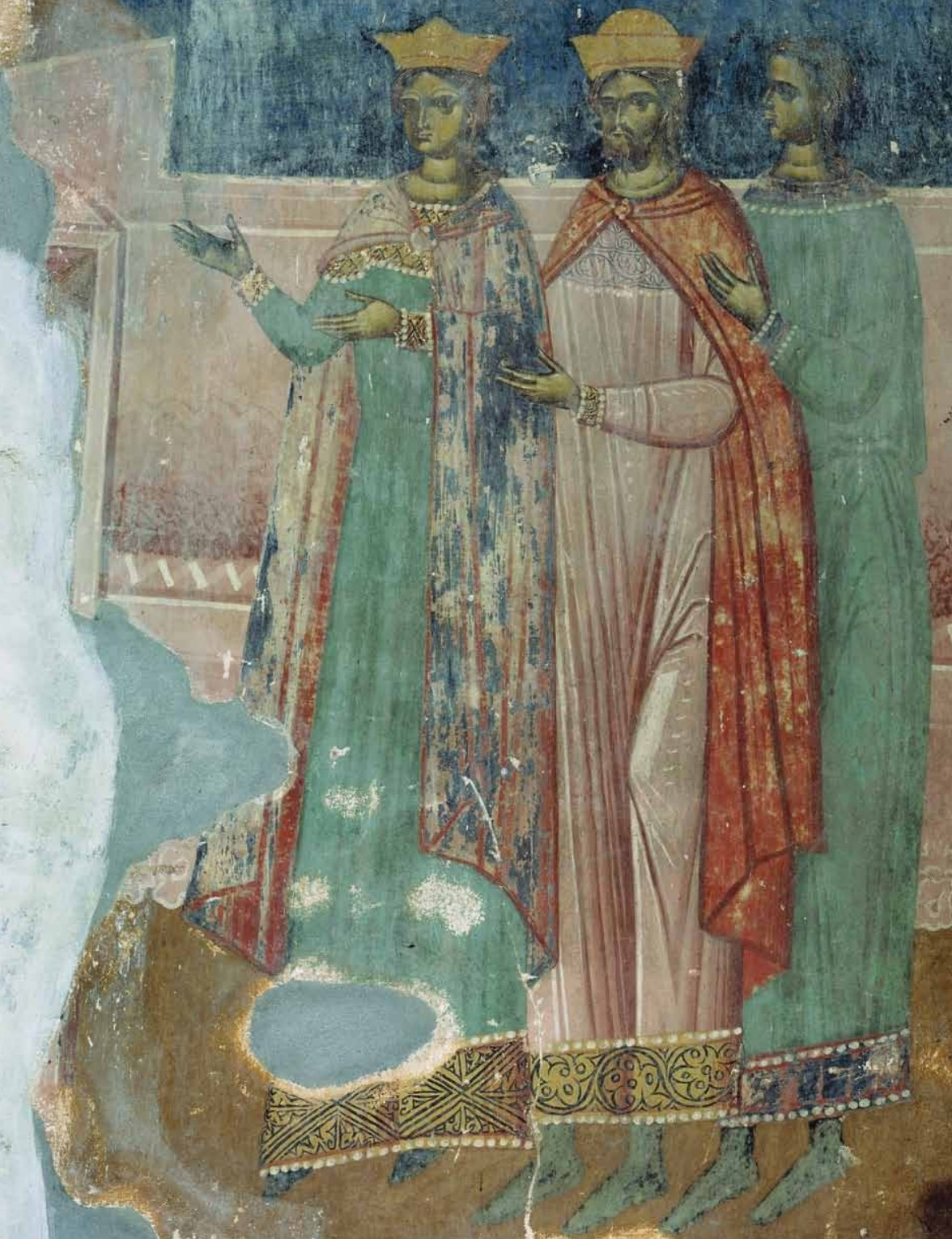
Tinatin Gurieli and King Levan, from a fresco from the Akhali Shuamta monastery

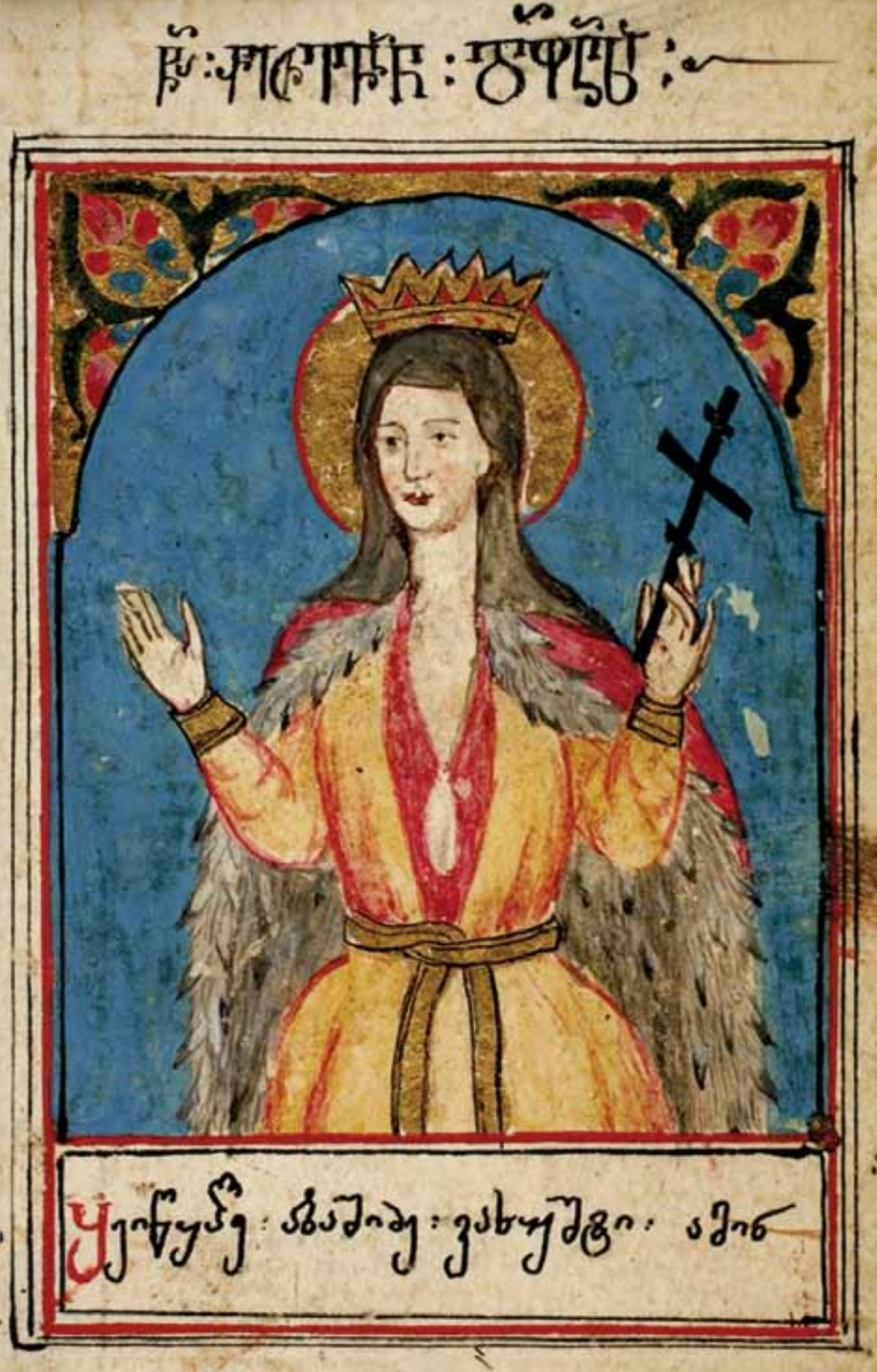
Ketevan of Mukhrani

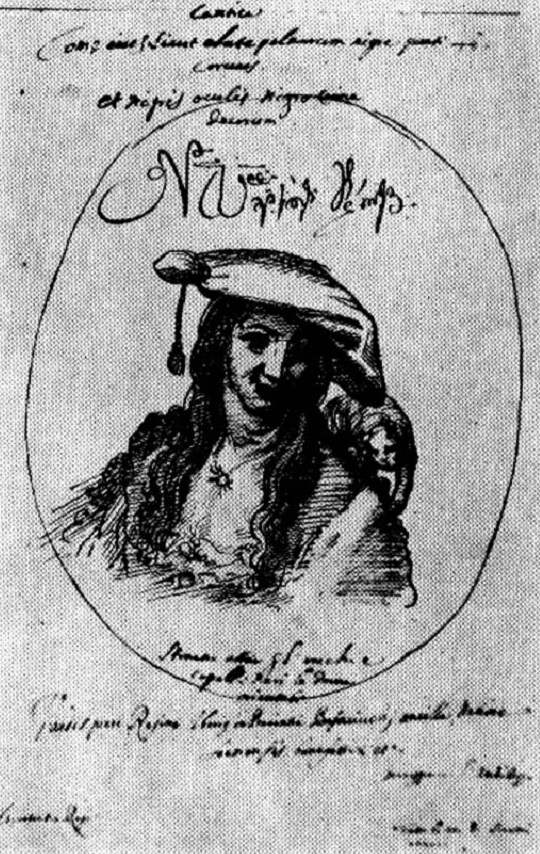
Darejan of Kakheti. A sketch by the contemporary Italian missionary Cristoforo Castelli.

Khoreshan of Kartli

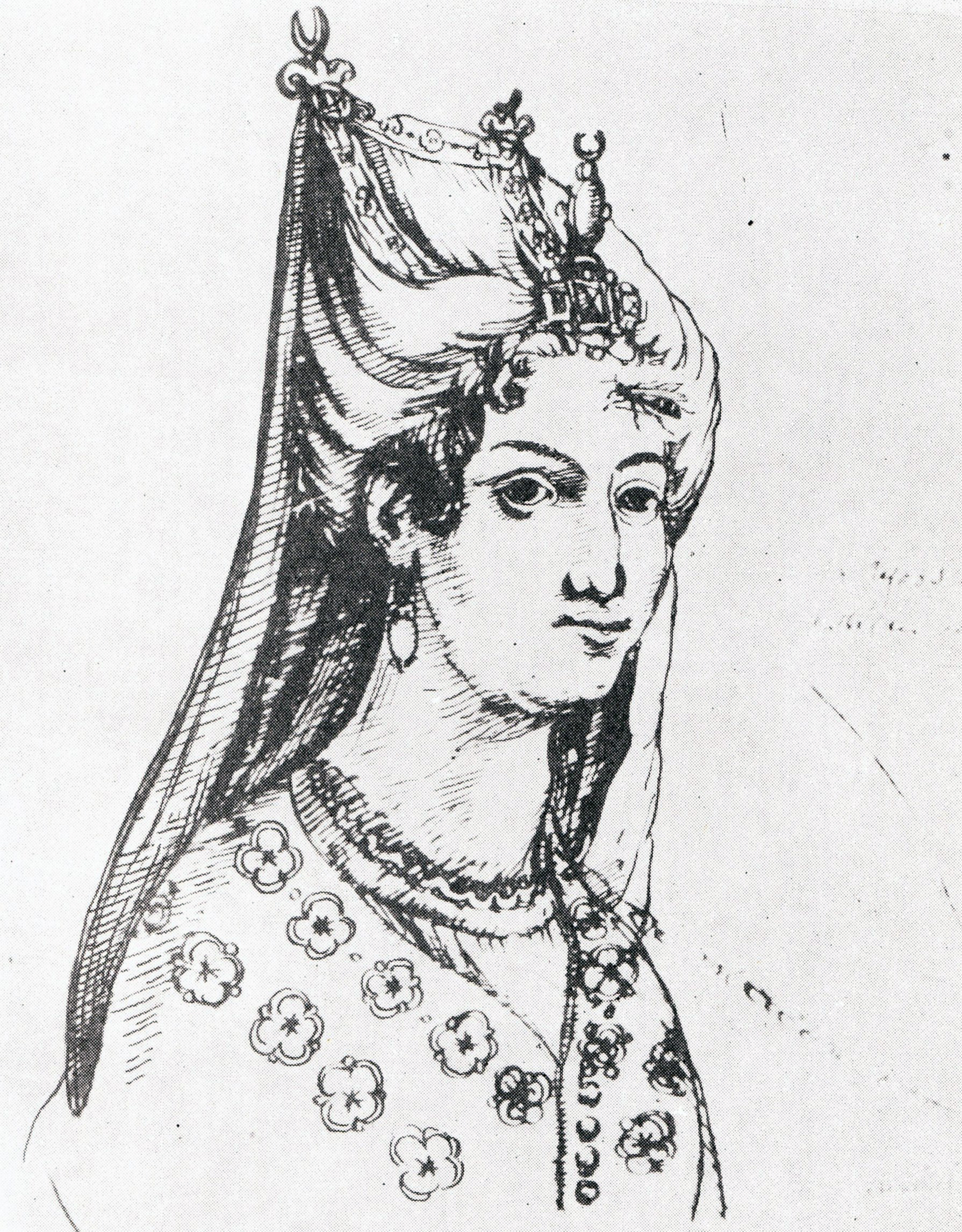
Mariam Dadiani

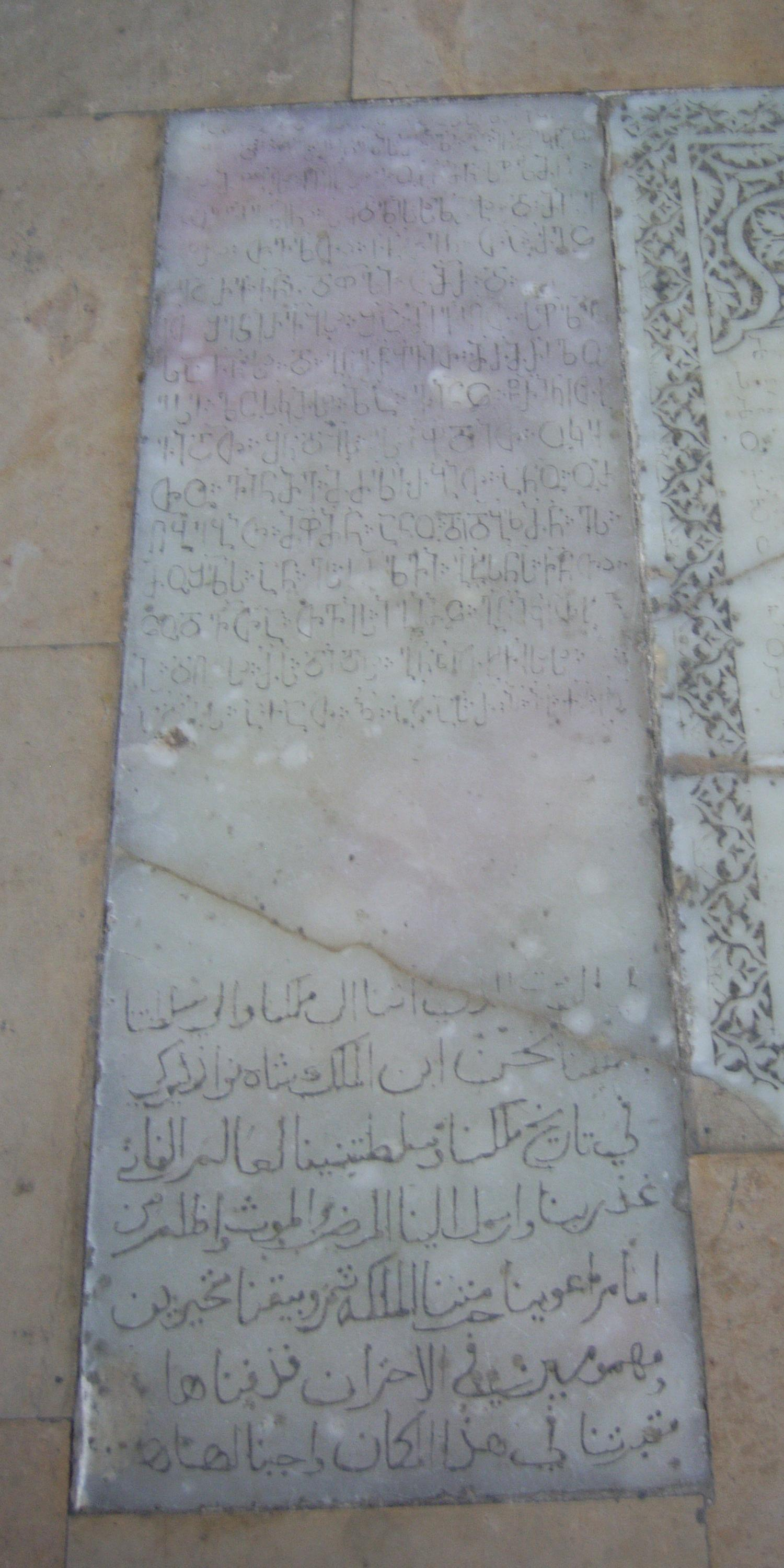
Epitaph of Tamar Davitashvili

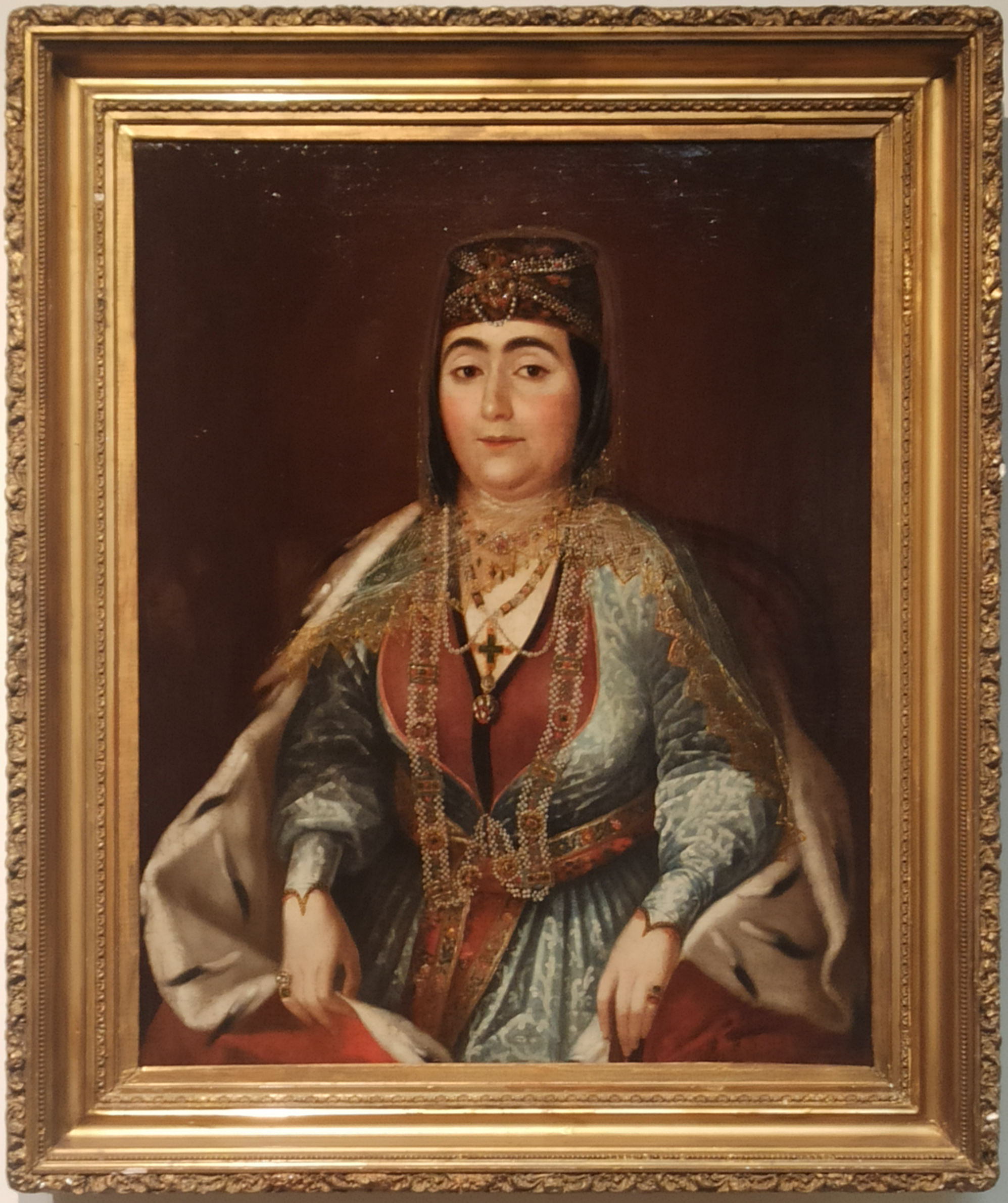
Darejan Dadiani

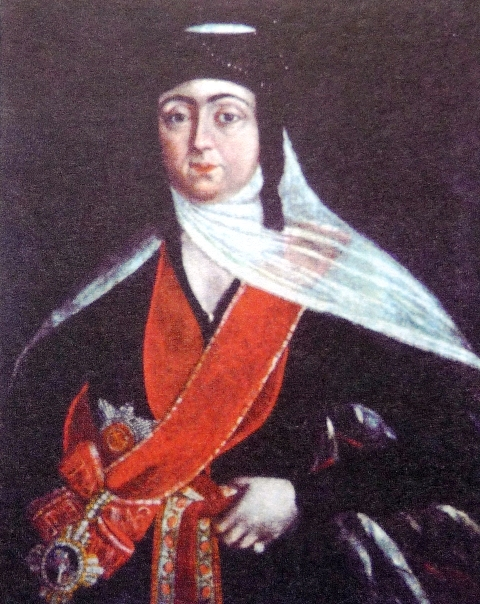
Mariam Tsitsishvili
