= Darejan of Kakheti, Queen of Imereti =

17th-century Queen of Imereti

Darejan of Kakheti
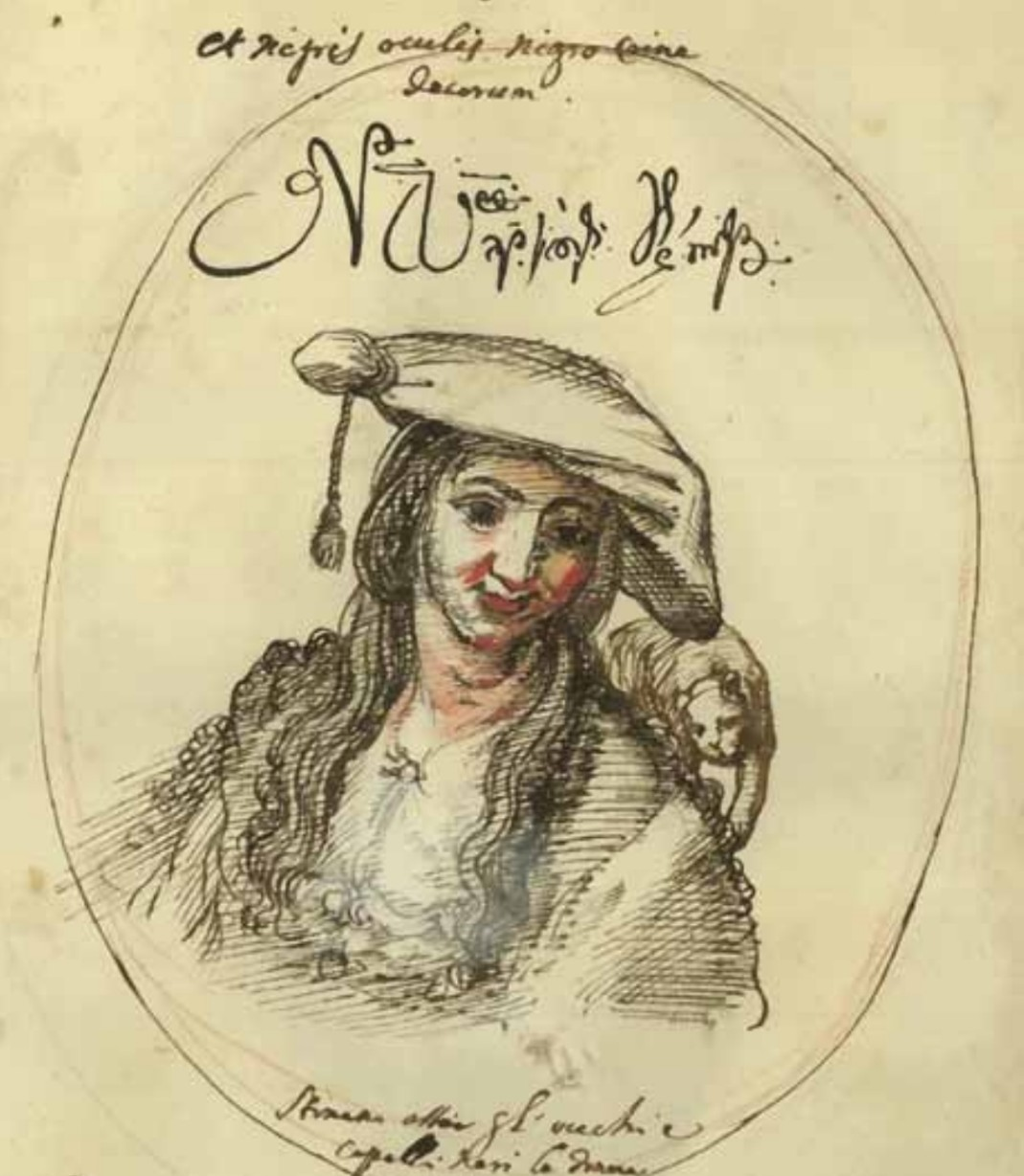
- Darejan, Queen of Imereti. A sketch by the contemporary Italian missionary Cristoforo Castelli.

Queen consort of Imereti
- Tenure: 1639–1660; 1661–1663; 1668
- Died: 1668
- Burial: Gelati Monastery prev. Church of All Saints, Kutaisi
- Spouse: Zurab, Duke of Aragvi (m. 1623; died 1631) Alexander III of Imereti (m. 1631; died 1660) Vakhtang of Imereti (m. 1661)
- Dynasty: Bagrationi
- Father: Teimuraz I
- Mother: Khoreshan of Kartli
- Religion: Georgian Orthodox Church
- Khelrtva

Darejan (Georgian: დარეჯანი, romanized: darejani) or Nestan-Darejan (Georgian: ნესტან-დარეჯანი, romanized: nest'an-darejani; died 1668) was a daughter of King Teimuraz I, a ruler of Kakheti in eastern Georgia, with a notable role in the contemporary politics of Georgia. Her three marriages represented a component of her family's and her own political machinations. Her first husband, Zurab, Duke of Aragvi, was put to death at the behest of Darejan's father in 1631. Her second and third marriages, to Alexander III and Vakhtang I, respectively in 1631 and 1661, made her a queen consort of Imereti, in western Georgia, where Darejan became embroiled in a series coups and counter-coups. She was eventually murdered by members of the rival party in Kutaisi.

== Early life and first marriage ==
Darejan was a daughter of Teimuraz I of Kakheti and his second wife Khoreshan, a sister of the neighboring Georgian monarch, Luarsab II of Kartli. In 1623, Teimuraz married off Darejan to his influential vassal, Zurab, Duke of Aragvi, in spite of the protests from Queen Khorashan, who blamed Zurab's family for many misfortunes that had befallen on her native Kartli. The marriage secured Zurab's support to Teimuraz against the warlord Giorgi Saakadze, in 1626, although Saakadze was himself married to Zurab's sister. Rid of Saakadze, Teimuraz then instigated Zurab to assassinate the rival pro-Persian ruler Simon II of Kartli in 1631, but he soon began to suspect Zurab of regal ambitions. Teimuraz invited his son-in-law to dinner and had him beheaded. He then sent Zurab's severed head to the Persian Shah Safi to prove his loyalty and to maintain his innocence in Simon II's death.

== Second marriage ==
On 14 May 1631, at Saportseli near Gori, Teimuraz married his widowed daughter to Crown Prince Alexander of Imereti. On this occasion, Teimuraz was presented with Shah Safi's decree confirmed him as a vassal king of Kartli and Kakheti, all of eastern Georgia. Having married Darejan to the Imeretian heir apparent, Teimuraz could now lay a foundation for unification of Georgia's three kingdoms. Alexander became king of Imereti in 1639 and died on 1 March 1660. He recognized no heir; Bagrat, his son by his first wife, had been disowned by Alexander; he had adopted Luarsab, a son of Darejan's late brother David, but the boy died. Prior to his death, Alexander, thus, had to recall his son Bagrat from Guria and make him his heir. Queen Dowager Darejan crowned Bagrat, but she had no intention of giving up her power. Although both were in their forties, Bagrat had to reckon with his step-mother's ambitions. Three days after Alexander's funeral, Darejan made Bagrat marry her niece Ketevan. All documents issued in Imereti during these years bore first Darejan's name, and second Bagrat's. As the conflict was brewing, the nobles became divided in two parties. Papuna, duke of Racha, urged Bagrat to employ the Ottoman force to remove Darejan, while the queen dowager enjoyed support of the Catholicos Simon I.

== Civil war ==
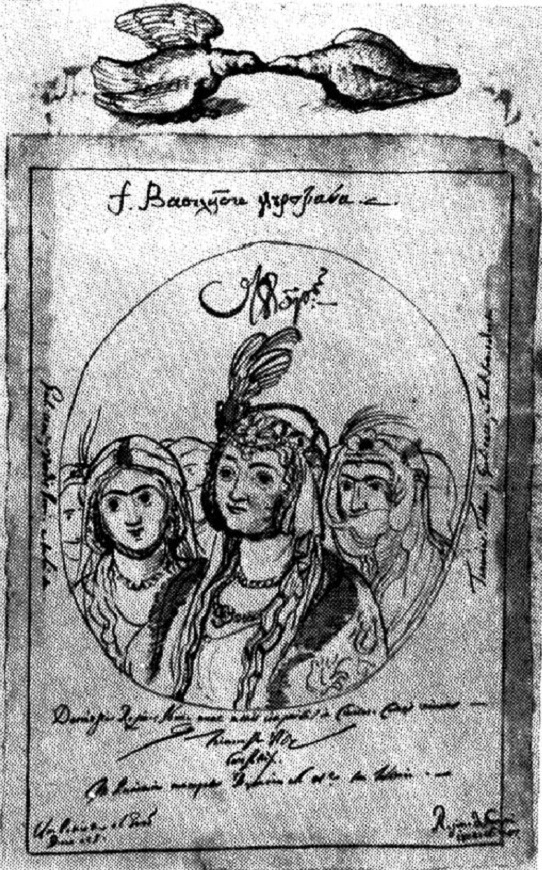
Queen Darejan of Imereti and her ladies-in-waiting. A drawing from De Castelli's travel album.

The matters headed to an open confrontation when Darejan persuaded Bagrat to divorce her niece Ketevan and suggested to the king that he should now marry her. On Bagrat's refusal, he was seized by Darejan's supporters and blinded. Darejan then offered the crown to her father Teimuraz, who had been ousted from eastern Georgia by the Persians and was then living in the Skanda castle in Imereti. Teimuraz, astounded by his daughter's vices, refused. Darejan then seized power, married an insignificant nobleman, Vakhtang Tchutchunashvili, who claimed a Bagrationi descent, and had him crowned king. The people of Imereti were outraged. The nobles of Lower Imereti invited Vameq III Dadiani, Prince of Mingrelia, and those of Upper Imereti called for Vakhtang V, King of Kartli, to intervene and overthrow Darejan and her husband. Vameq took the couple prisoner, had Vakhtang blinded, and usurped the throne of Imereti. Darejan appealed to Vakhtang V for help, offering her now divorced niece Ketevan for Vakhtang V's son Archil II, and her throne to Vakhtang himself. Vakhtang V moved into Upper Imereti in 1661 and Imereti became a battleground for the rulers of Kartli and Mingrelia. During the turmoil Darejan and her husband became hostages of the Ottoman pasha of Akhaltsikhe and were placed under arrest in Oltu, from where she asked, via her Moscow-based nephew Nicholas, the tsar of Russia to intervene, but her pleas remained unanswered.

== Death ==
Imereti remained in a state of anarchy. In 1668, Aslan, the pasha of Akhaltsikhe, motivated partly by a bribe offered by Darejan and partly the massacre of the Turkish soldiers at Kutaisi, marched into Imereti, placed Darejan and Vakhtang on the thrones, and plundered much of the country. The royal couple did not long survive their restoration. Different accounts are given of the manner of their deaths. According to the 18th-century Georgian historian Prince Vakhushti of Kartli, certain of the nobles of Imereti persuaded Darejan's vizier Khosia Lashkhishvili to kill her. According to this version, Khosia murdered her with a spear as she was doing her hair while other conspirators dispatched her husband Vakhtang in the square outside. The French traveler Jean Chardin relates, on the other hand, that the vizier lured Darejan to his apartment where Darejan was then stabbed to death. Following Chardin, Darejan's husband was held until the arrival of the blind Bagrat, the legitimate monarch, who had his hand guided as he stabbed the usurper repeatedly, exclaiming, "Traitor, you had my eyes put out; I shall tear out your heart!" Yet another 18th-century Georgian source, the anonymous Paris Chronicle, reports that Khosia Akhvlediani conspired with Prince Sekhnia Chkheidze to attack her while they were discussing state affairs in the presence of Bishop Sophron of Gelati. Khosia wounded the queen in her breast with a musket shot, then tied her up and bribed the Turkish garrison soldiers to allow him to stab her to death in the castle gateway. In the meantime, her husband Vakhtang was beheaded. The couple were interred at the Church of All Saints in Kutaisi. A year later, Darejan was afforded a royal burial at the Gelati Monastery.

== Ancestry ==
Ancestors of Darejan of Kakheti, Queen of Imereti

16. Levan of Kakheti
8. Alexander II of Kakheti
17. Tinatin Gurieli
4. David I of Kakheti
18. Bardzim Amilakhvari
9. Tinatin Amilakhvari
2. Teimuraz I
20. Bagrat, Prince of Mukhrani
10. Ashotan I, Prince of Mukhrani
21. Elene N.
5. Ketevan the Martyr
1. Darejan
24. Luarsab I
12. Simon I of Kartli
25. Tamar of Imereti (died 1556)
6. George X
26. Levan of Kakheti
13. Nestan-Darejan of Kakheti
27. N. of Tarku
3. Khoreshan of Kartli
28. Mamia III Dadiani
14. Giorgi I of Lipartiani
29. Elisabed N.
7. Tamar of Lipartiani
15. Taji N.

== Notes ==
Royal titles
Preceded by Tamar	Queen consort of Imereti; 1639–1660	Succeeded by Zira Dadiani
Preceded by Titia of Mukhrani	Queen consort of Imereti; 1661–1663	Succeeded by Titia of Mukhrani
Preceded by Tamar of Mukhrani	Queen consort of Imereti; 1668	Succeeded by Tamar of Mukhrani
