= Ketevan of Kakheti (1648–1719) =

Ketevan

Queen consort of Imereti
- Tenure: 1660–1661; 1678–1679; 1690–1691; 1695–1696; 1698

Queen consort of Kakheti
- Tenure: 1668–1675
- Born: 1648
- Died: 1719 (aged 70–71); Moscow
- Burial: Donskoy Monastery
- Spouse: Bagrat IV of Imereti (m. 1661; div. 1661) Archil II (m. 1677; died 1713)
- Issue: Darejan; Alexander; Mamuka; David
- Dynasty: Bagrationi
- Father: Prince David of Kakheti
- Mother: Helen Diasamidze
- Religion: Georgian Orthodox Church
- Khelrtva

Ketevan (Georgian: ქეთევანი; 1648 – 16 April 1719) was a princess (batonishvili) of the royal house of Kakheti, a kingdom in eastern Georgia. She was a daughter of Prince David of Kakheti and, by virtue of her marriages to Bagrat IV and Archil II, a queen consort of Imereti, a kingdom in western Georgia (1660–1661, 1678–1679, 1690–1691, 1695–1696, and 1698), and of Kakheti (1668–1675). In 1684 she accompanied her husband Archil in exile in Russia, where she was known as Tsaritsa Catherine of Imereti (Russian: Екатерина Давыдовна Имеретинская, Ekaterina Davydovna Imeretinskaya). She died in Moscow at the age of 71.

== Early life and first marriage ==
Ketevan was a daughter of Prince David of Kakheti and his wife, Helen Diasamidze. She was a granddaughter of King Teimuraz I of Kakheti on her father's side and grandniece of the catholicos of the Georgian Orthodox Church Eudemus I on her mother's side. Her father was killed in a battle with the Persians and their loyal Georgian nobles the same year she was born. Ketevan was reared by her aunt, Darejan, a consort of King Alexander III of Imereti. After Alexander's death on 1 March 1660, Darejan made all efforts to bring his heir and her step-son Bagrat IV under her influence, marrying him to her niece Ketevan three days after Alexander's funeral. With Darejan unwilling to give up power, the tensions rose in the royal family. The queen dowager persuaded Bagrat to divorce Ketevan and suggested to the king that he should now marry her. As Bagrat rejected the offer, he was captured and blinded on Darejan's order. Darejan then married a local nobleman, Vakhtang Tchuchunaishvili, and made him king. The coup inaugurated nearly a century of anarchy in Imereti, which left the country in ruins.

== Second and third marriages ==
In 1661, Darejan, beleaguered by enemies from all sides, appealed to Vakhtang V, King of Kartli, for help, offering her niece Ketevan for Vakhtang V's son Archil, and her throne to Vakhtang himself. The deal did not materialize and Darejan, her husband Vakhtang, and Ketevan found themselves in captivity of the Ottoman pasha of Childir in Oltu. When in 1663 Archil, son of Vakhtang V, was deposed in Imereti and sent to Persia for confirmation as king of Kakheti, he decided to marry Ketevan in order to assert his claim to Imereti. Vakhtang V paid 20,000 silver kuruş to ransom Ketevan from the pasha. Archil, then king of Kakheti, wed Ketavan in Tbilisi on 22 March 1668. In 1675, Archil, at odds with the Persian grand vizier Shaykh Ali Khan Zanganeh, left Kakheti and launched a series of attempts to establish himself in Imereti. By 1699, Archil gave up all hopes of reclaiming Imereti and finally settled down in Russia, whose government had first granted him and his family asylum in 1686.

== Later life and death ==
The couple's life in Russia was further marred in 1711 by the death of their last surviving son, Prince Alexander, who, a Russian artillery commander, had fallen in the hands of the victorious Swedes at Narva in 1700. On Archil's death in Moscow in 1713, with no surviving male children, Ketevan succeeded him as a steward of the estates granted upon the Georgian family by the Russian government, such as Vsekhsvyatskoye in the Moscow Governorate and Lyskovo in the Nizhny Novgorod Governorate. She died in Moscow on 16 April 1719 and was buried weeks later, due to a stormy flood, on 5 May 1719 at the Donskoy Monastery, alongside her husband. Archil's estates would pass, in 1724, to the family of his relative and yet another Georgian exile, Vakhtang VI.

== Children ==
Ketevan had children only by her marriage to Archil. These were one daughter and three sons:

- Princess Darejan, known in Russia as Darya Archilovna (1670 – 1740); she died unmarried and was buried at the Donskoy Monastery.
- Prince Alexander, known in Russia as Aleksandr Archilovich (1674 – 20 February 1711), a Russian army artillery commander under Peter the Great. He was married, with one daughter.
- Prince Mamuka, known in Russia as Matfey Archilovich (1676 – 23 March 1693); he died unmarried and was buried at the Donskoy Monastery.
- Prince David, known in Russia as David Archilovich (2 July 1682 – 24 October 1688); he died unmarried, buried at the Novodevichy Convent, and reburied in 1711 at the Donskoy Monastery.

== Ancestry ==
Ancestors of Ketevan of Kakheti (1648–1719)

16. Alexander II of Kakheti
8. David I of Kakheti
17. Tinatin Amilakhvari
4. Teimuraz I
18. Ashotan I, Prince of Mukhrani
9. Ketevan the Martyr
2. Prince David of Kakheti
20. Simon I of Kartli
10. George X
21. Nestan-Darejan of Kakheti
5. Khoreshan of Kartli
22. Giorgi I Lipartiani
11. Tamar Lipartiani
23. Taji N.
1. Ketevan
6. Levan Diasamidze
3. Elene Diasamidze
