= Tamar of Mukhrani =

- Princess of Mukhrani
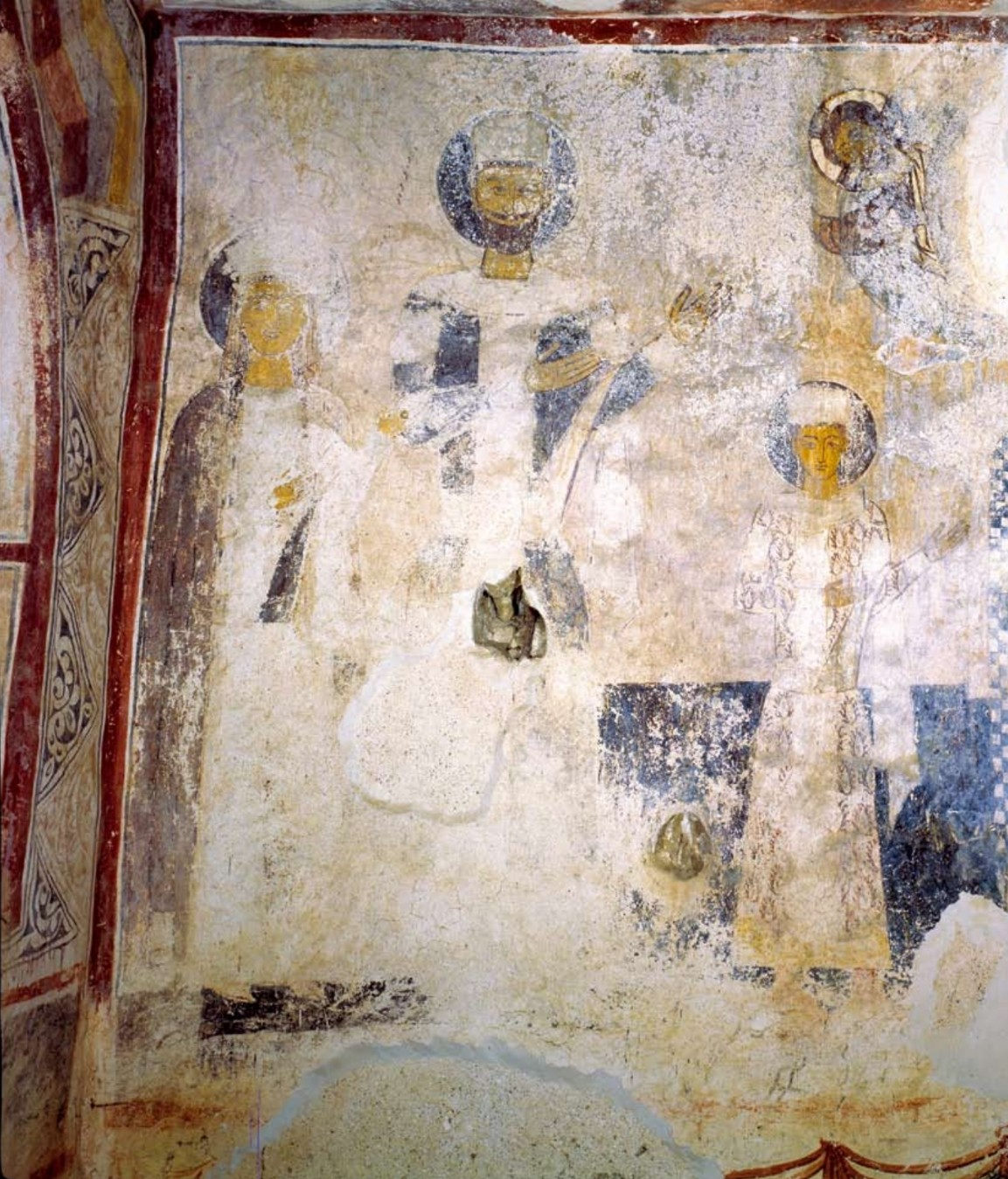
- A fresco at Gelati Monastery possibly depicting King Bagrat IV of Imereti, his wife Queen Tamar, and his young son, Alexander IV.
- Died: 1683; Mingrelia
- Spouse: Levan III Dadiani (m. 1661; div. 1663) Bagrat IV of Imereti (m. 1663; div. 1678) Levan III Dadiani (m. 1678; div. 1679) Bagrat IV of Imereti (m. 1679; died 1683) George III Gurieli (m. 1683)
- Issue: Princess Darejan; Prince George; Princess Tinatin
- House: Mukhrani
- Father: Constantine I, Prince of Mukhrani
- Mother: Darejan Abashidze
- Religion: Georgian Orthodox Church

Tamar (Georgian: თამარი; died 1683) was a Georgian princess of the House of Mukhrani who was married, successively, to three sovereigns of western Georgia—Levan III Dadiani, Prince of Mingrelia, then King Bagrat IV of Imereti, and finally, George III Gurieli, Prince of Guria. Tamar's marriages were part of political intrigues and accompanying wife swaps characteristic for the Georgian history of that century.

== Family background and first marriage ==
Tamar was a daughter of Constantine I, Prince of Mukhrani, by his wife Darejan, daughter of Prince Ghuana Abashidze. She was, thus, a brotherly niece of King Vakhtang V of Kartli. Both eyewitnesses, such as the French traveler Jean Chardin, and historians, such as the 18th-century royal Prince Vakhushti, characterize Tamar as being exceptionally beautiful as well as passionate and seductive.

Tamar's first marriage was occasioned by a military campaign of her uncle, Vakhtang V, into the western Georgian polities in the course of which, in 1661, he replaced King Bagrat IV of Imereti with his own son, Archil II, and Vameq III Dadiani, Prince of Mingrelia, with his protégé, Levan III Dadiani. Levan was given Tamar in marriage, but the couple became soon estranged from each other. Although Levan was in love with his wife, neither him nor Tamar was faithful.

== Second marriage ==
The union was terminated after Levan's adventurous attack on Bagrat IV upon his restoration in Imereti, in 1663, ended in disaster. Levan was captured and imprisoned in the Imeretian capital of Kutaisi. Bagrat V, who had earlier been blinded by his imperious stepmother Darejan, was married to Tamar's younger sister Tatia. A chain of intrigues ensued. The Imeretian courtiers induced Bagrat's sister, Tinatin, to seduce and marry the captive Mingrelian prince Levan, while Bagrat was convinced to discard Tatia and marry her more beautiful sister, Tamar. Simon, Catholicos of the Imeretian church, granted two divorces on the same day. Levan was set free, but he was still in love with Tamar and his enmity with Bagrat perpetuated. In 1678, Vakhtang's son Archil again expelled Bagrat from Kutaisi, forcing Tamar into flight to the Skande castle where she was captured and sent back to Levan in Mingrelia. Next year, Bagrat reconquered Imereti with the Ottoman troops, then raided Mingrelia and retook his wife. Despite this, Bagrat had to tolerate Tamar's adultery. The Frenchman Chardin, who dined with Tamar in Kutaisi in 1670, was shocked by her flagrant affair with the bishop of Gelati. Bagrat himself joked to Chardin that in Imereti every bishop had nine wives, "not counting those of his neighbors".

== Third marriage and death ==
Bagrat and Tamar had three children, a son and two daughters. One of their daughters, Darejan, was married off to George III Gurieli, Prince of Guria, who had an eye both on Tamar and the throne of Imereti. According to Prince Vakhushti, George was "querulous, godless, bloodthirsty, and a merciless slave-trader". When Bagrat died in 1681, George III Gurieli seized the throne of Imereti, divorced his child-bride Darejan and married his own mother-in-law, the queen dowager Tamar. Tamar died two years later, probably in childbirth, and George Gurieli, abhorred by the Imeretians, was overthrown and killed in an attempt to reconquer Kutaisi in 1684.
