= Princess Darejan of Imereti =

- Born: 1670
- Died: 6 October 1740 (aged 69–70)
- Burial: Donskoy Monastery
- Dynasty: Bagrationi
- Father: Archil II
- Mother: Ketevan of Kakheti
- Religion: Georgian Orthodox Church

Darejan or Darya (Georgian: დარეჯანი; Russian: Дарья Арчиловна, Darya Archilovna; 1670 – 6 October 1740) was a daughter of Archil II, sometime king of Imereti and of Kakheti in western and eastern parts of Georgia, respectively, by his wife Ketevan of Kakheti. In the 1680s, Darejan followed her parents and brothers into exile in Russia, where she lived a semi-secluded life, mostly at her family estate of Vsekhsvyatskoye at Moscow, occupied in local charity and benevolence.

== Engagement ==
At the age of 7, Darejan was affianced to the boy-prince Manuchar, a son of Levan III Dadiani, Prince of Mingrelia. On this occasion, Manuchar arrived at the court of Darejan's grandfather, King Vakhtang V, but, before the marriage could be consummated, the Mingrelians abducted him and brought back to his father upon being informed by Bagrat IV of Imereti that Vakhtang V allegedly planned to send Manuchar as a hostage to Persia.

== Life in Russia ==
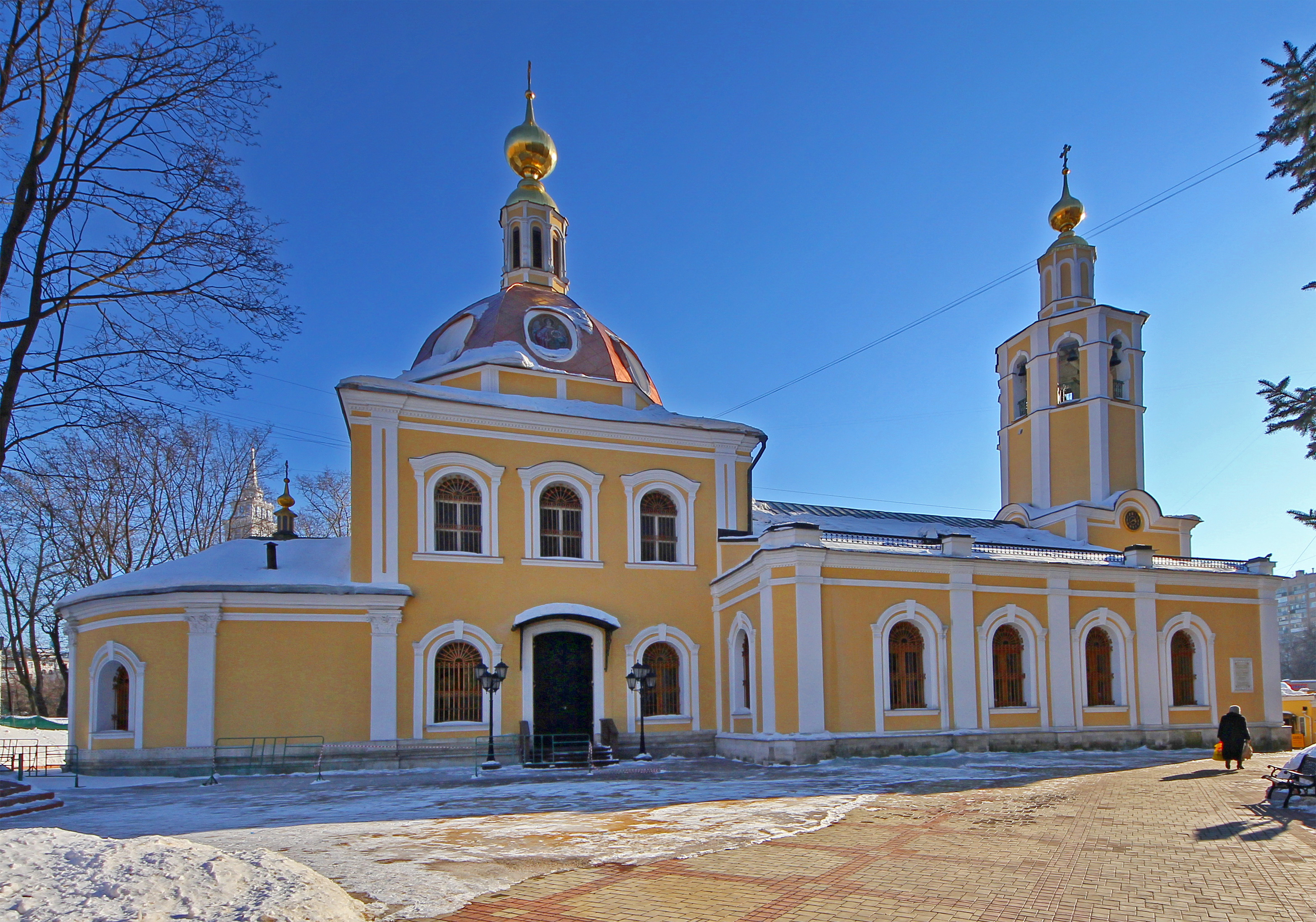
The Vsekhsvyatskoye Church of All Saints in 2011.

Darejan's family moved in Russia in 1684 and her father Archil finally established himself at Moscow after giving up all his claims to the crown of Imereti in 1699. Darejan succeeded in 1711 on the death of her brother Prince Alexander, a Russian army artillery commander, in the Swedish captivity, to the stewardship of the village of Vsekhsvyatskoye, now part of Moscow's Sokol District, which had been granted upon the Georgian family by the Russian government in 1686. Darejan spent most of her subsequent life in this estate, turning it into a Georgian émigré colony in Russia. She never married and had no children. She refrained from the courtly life and even declined in 1722 Peter the Great's personal offer to take part in the celebrations on the occasion of the treaty of Nystad with Sweden. Yet, in the 1720s, she played a role in the diplomacy between her cousin, Vakhtang VI, and the Russian government. Her estate hosted Grand Duchess Natalya Alexeyevna, who died there of measles in 1728, and Anna Ioannovna, preparing for a stately entry into Moscow upon her selection as the empress of Russia in 1730. From 1733 to 1736, she sponsored the construction of the Church of All the Saints in Vsekhsvyatskoye, which is still extant. Darejan died in 1740 and was buried at the Donskoy Monastery.

== Bibliography ==
- Toumanoff, Cyril (1976). Manuel de Généalogie et de Chronologie pour l'histoire de la Caucasie chrétienne (Arménie, Géorgie, Albanie) [Manual of Genealogy and Chronology of Christian Caucasian History (Armenia, Georgia, Albania)] (in French). Rome: Edizioni Aquila.
