= Khoreshan of Kartli =

17th-century Queen of Kakheti

Khoreshan
- Khorashan by Teramo Castelli.

Queen consort of Kakheti
- Tenure: 1612–1616; 1625–1633; 1634–1648

Queen consort of Kartli
- Tenure: 1625–1633
- Died: 1659
- Spouse: Teimuraz I (m. 1612)
- Issue: Prince David; Princess Darejan; Princess Tinatin
- Dynasty: Bagrationi
- Father: George X
- Mother: Tamar Lipartiani
- Religion: Georgian Orthodox Church
- Khelrtva

Khoreshan (Georgian: ხორეშანი, also Khorashan, ხორაშანი, or Khvareshan, ხვარეშანი; died 1659) was a Queen consort of Kakheti. She was a member of the Georgian Bagrationi dynasty, a daughter of King George X of Kartli and a consort of Teimuraz I of Kakheti, whom she married as his second wife in 1612. She spent more than four decades of her life with Teimuraz, whose eventful reign ended with his final overthrow by a pro-Iranian faction in 1648. Khoreshan accompanied him on his flights and comebacks. She was involved in diplomacy and patronized Catholic missionaries.

== Family background and marriage ==
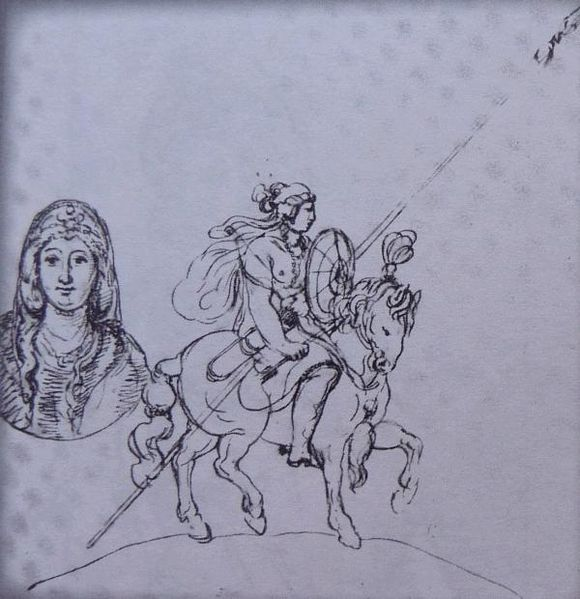
Queen Khoreshan, a sketch by the Catholic missionaire Teramo Castelli.

Khoreshan was the daughter of George X of Kartli by his wife Tamar Lipartiani. Among her four siblings was Luarsab II, George X's successor to the throne of Kartli and, eventually, a saint of the Georgian Orthodox Church. Khoreshan had been promised to Baadur, eldest son of the influential Georgian nobleman, Nugzar, Duke of Aragvi, but the girl was given by Luarsab in marriage to a 23-year-old widower, King Teimuraz I of Kakheti, in 1612. This breach of faith offended the ducal family and brought trouble to Luarsab in the following years. A younger brother of Khoreshan's former fiancé, Zurab, would later marry her daughter Darejan in spite of Khoreshan's opposition to this union.

Teimuraz's marriage to Khoreshan was encouraged and even insisted upon by Abbas I, the Safavid Shah of Iran, an overlord of both Kartli and Kakheti. Teimuraz was initially reluctant as Khoreshan was his relative through their common great-grandfather Levan of Kakheti, but he eventually bowed to the shah's will and wed her at Gremi. Further marriage arrangements to cement loyalty of the Georgian rulers were made in the same year; Khoreshan's younger sister, Tinatin, was sent to the harem of Shah Abbas, where Elene, a sister of Teimuraz, had already been installed. When discussing the rationale behind these marriages, the 18th-century Georgian chronicler, Prince Vakhushti, claims Abbas desired to humiliate the Georgian monarchs and offend their Christian values.

== Queen consort of Kakheti ==
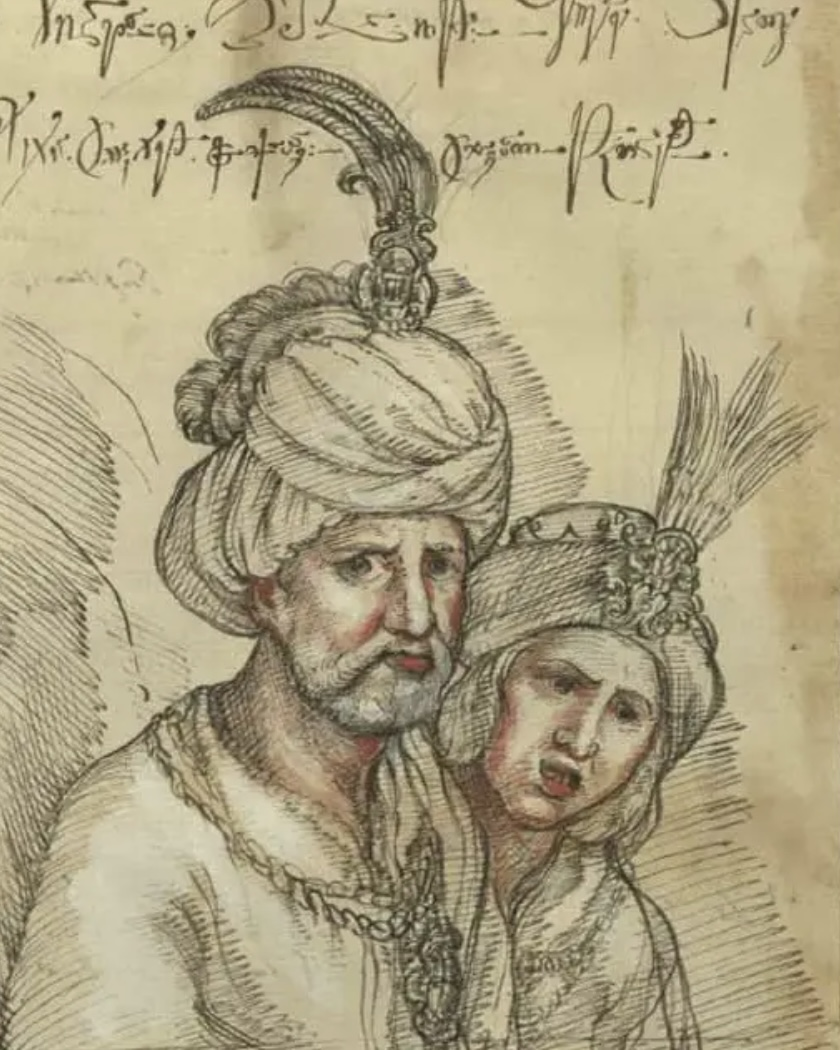
King Teimuraz I and Queen Khoreshan, a sketch from the album of the contemporaneous Roman Catholic missionary Cristoforo Castelli.

Khoreshan thus became a queen consort of Teimuraz and his faithful companion for 47 years of the king's turbulent life. Four times, in 1614, 1616, 1633, and in 1648, the couple was forced into flight from their kingdom as a result of Teimuraz's obstinate resistance to the Iranian hegemony. Twice, in 1625 and again in 1633, was Teimuraz able to briefly extend his rule over Kartli, the kingdom of his brother-in-law, Luarsab, who had been put to death at Shah Abbas's order in 1622. In the course of these events, Kakheti was devastated and the population shrank significantly as a result of war and waves of deportation to Iran's interior.

At least on one occasion, Khoreshan nearly fell into the hands of the Iranian soldiers. In 1620, when Khoreshan was accompanying Teimuraz in his journey in the Ottoman Empire during their second exile from Kakheti, Shah Abbas sent a force under the beylerbey of Erivan, Amirgune Khan, to seize Khoreshan and her entourage, staying at that time at Oltu. According to the Georgian chronicles, Khoreshan had a dream that she was attacked and robbed by soldiers. The queen was so alarmed that she immediately retired, with her people, into a hideout within the town's citadel. Amirgune Khan appeared at dawn, but he failed to find the fugitives, and withdrew, only to be attacked and defeated by the queen's majordomo, Prince Nodar Jorjadze, on his road back to Iran. This description of events is similar to that provided by the contemporary Portuguese Augustinian friar Ambrósio dos Anjos in his account of the martyrdom of Teimuraz's mother, Queen Ketevan, in Iran. According to Ambrósio dos Anjos, Shah Abbas intended to take Teimuraz's wife Khoreshan as his own in order to humiliate the recalcitrant Georgian ruler. Capitalizing on Teimuraz's temporary absence from home, the shah's men attempted her abduction, but the besieging Iranian force was stalled until Teimuraz was able to return unexpectedly, putting the intruders to rout.

Prince Vakhushti also reports an incident in which Teimuraz, outraged at defection of the nobles of the Baratashvili clan, was about to have their wives mutilated, but Khoreshan did not allow him such an act of revenge.

== Last years ==
The couple eventually ended up in exile in the Kingdom of Imereti in western Georgia in 1648, having lost their only son, Prince David, in a battle with the Iranian army in the same year. The latest downfall of Teimuraz, which proved to be permanent, was occasioned by the enthronement of Rostom of Kartli, a pro-Iranian relative of Khoreshan. The beleaguered king Teimuraz sent Khoreshan to parley; Rostom treated the queen with honor and magnanimously allowed his adversary a safe passage to Imereti. Teimuraz's last hopes rested on Russia, whither he departed in 1656. He returned to Imereti in 1659, with no tangible results, finding his queen already dead.

== Ancestry ==
Ancestors of Khoreshan of Kartli

16. David X
8. Luarsab I
17. Tamar Jaqeli
4. Simon I of Kartli
18. Bagrat III of Imereti
9. Tamar of Imereti
19. Tamar N.
2. George X
20. George II of Kakheti
10. Levan of Kakheti
21. Elene Cholokashvili
5. Nestan-Darejan of Kakheti
22. Kamal Kara-Musel, Shamkhal of Tarki
11. N. of Tarku
1. Khoreshan
24. Liparit II Dadiani
12. Mamia III Dadiani
6. George I Lipartiani
13. Elisabed N.
3. Tamar Lipartiani
7. Taji N.

== Notes ==
Royal titles
Preceded by Ana Gurieli	Queen consort of Kakheti; 1612–1616; 1625–1633; 1634–1648	Vacant Kakheti deposed and union with Kartli Title next held by Ketevan of Kakheti
Preceded by Jahan Banu Begum	Queen consort of Kartli; 1625–1633	Succeeded by Ketevan Abashishvili
