= George IV of Imereti =

George IV "Gochia" (Georgian: გიორგი V გოჩია, Giorgi V Gočia) was King of Imereti (western Georgia) from 1696 to 1698. He is frequently referred to as George V when George III Gurieli, who had reigned as king of Imereti from 1681 to 1683, is included in the list of the kings of Imereti.

== Biography ==
He was a relative of the reigning Bagrationi dynasty and resided in Mingrelia until recalled by the party of Imeretian nobles and installed as king after the deposition of King Archil II in 1696. The powerful leader of this party, Prince Giorgi-Malakia Abashidze, gave his daughter Princess Tamar Abashidze, widow of Alexander IV of Imereti, in marriage to George V, and became a virtual ruler of the kingdom. Despised for his incompetence and ignobility, George was soon deposed by Abashidze aided by Shoshita Chkheidze, Duke of Racha, who restored Archil to the Imeretian throne.

Preceded by Archil II	King of Imereti; 1696–1698	Succeeded by Archil II
