= Prince David of Kakheti =

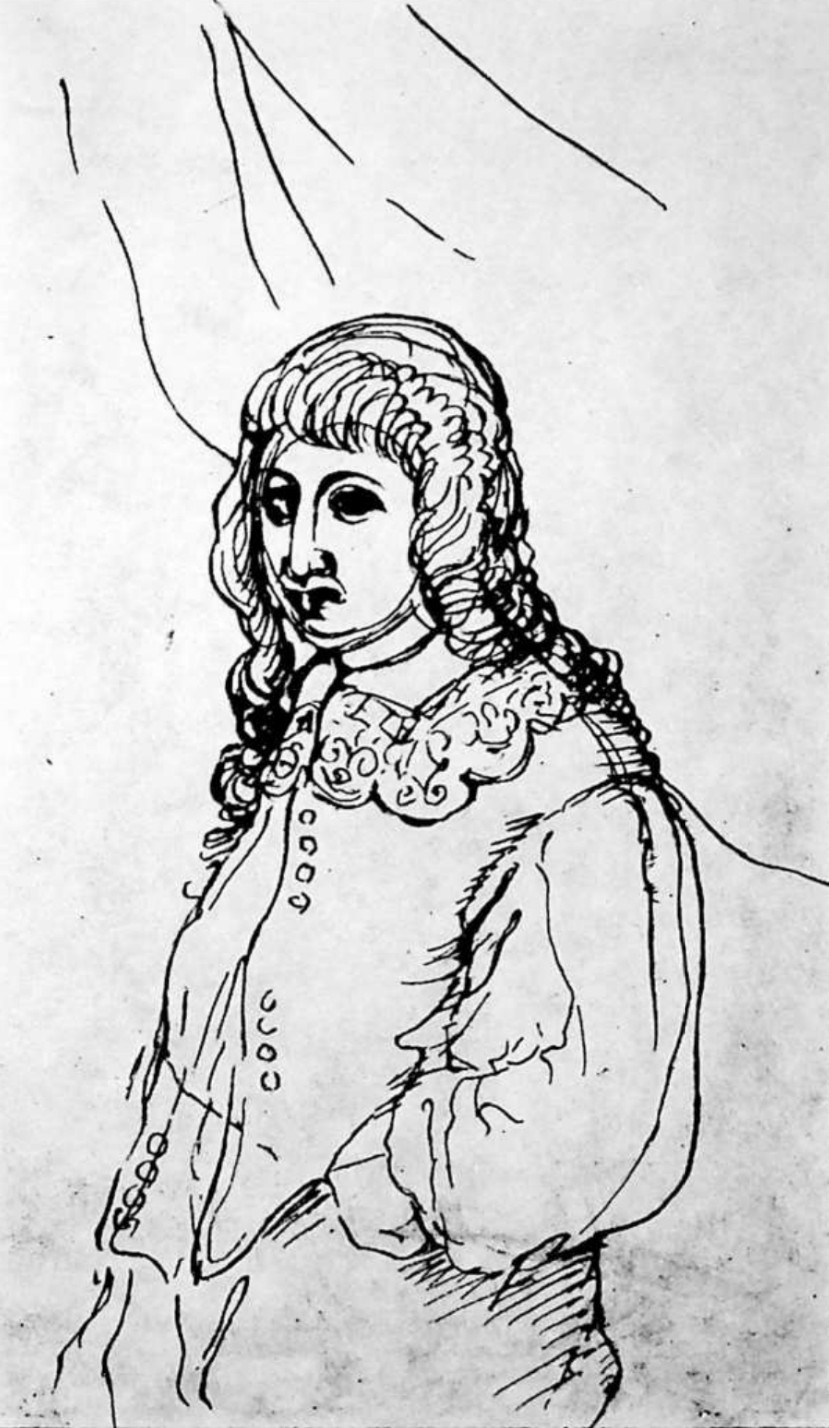
- David in sketch by the contemporary Italian missionary Cristoforo Castelli.

Ruler of Mukhrani
- Reign: 1626–1628
- Predecessor: Kaikhosro
- Successor: Vakhtang II
- Born: 1612
- Died: 1648 (aged 35–36); Magharo
- Burial: Alaverdi Monastery
- Spouse: Helen Diasamidze
- Issue Among others: Prince Luarsab; Heraclius I of Kakheti; Princess Ketevan
- Dynasty: Bagrationi
- Father: Teimuraz I of Kakheti
- Mother: Khoreshan of Kartli
- Religion: Georgian Orthodox Church
- Khelrtva

David, (Georgian: დავითი, romanized: daviti) also known by the hypocorism Datuna (Georgian: დათუნა; 1612–1648), was a prince (batonishvili) of the royal house of Kakheti, a kingdom in eastern Georgia. He was the only son of King Teimuraz I of Kakheti to have survived into adulthood. He fathered the future King Heraclius I of Kakheti, who continued the royal line of the Kakhetian Bagrationi. From 1626 to 1628, he held sway over the fief of Mukhrani, whose princely rulers had been dispossessed by Teimuraz I. He was killed in 1648 during a battle against the pro-Persian Georgian ruler Rostom of Kartli.

== Early life ==
David was born around 1612 into the family of Teimuraz I of Kakheti and his second wife Khoreshan, a sister of the neighboring Georgian monarch, Luarsab II of Kartli. He was the youngest of Teimuraz's sons and the king's only male offspring to have survived into adulthood. David's two elder half-brothers died in captivity in Persia, castrated at the order of the Persian shah Abbas I, who fought a devastating war against Kakheti in order to bend Teimuraz I into submission. David emerged in the political life of eastern Georgia in 1626, when he was bestowed with the princedom of Mukhrani, the fief of Kaikhosro, Prince of Mukhrani, a disgraced nobleman of Kartli, who had been forced to seek refuge in the Ottoman Empire along with Teimuraz's domestic arch-rival, Giorgi Saakadze. He rule it until 1628, before Mukhrani was restored to a member of its earlier princely family, Vakhtang II.

== Later years and death ==
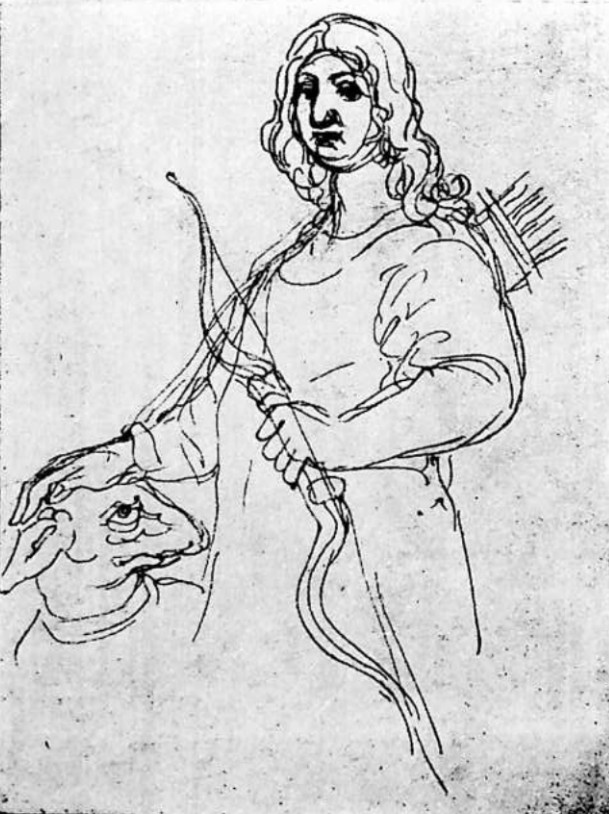
Prince David, a sketch by the Catholic missionaire Teramo Castelli.

In 1633, Teimuraz was overthrown by the seasoned Muslim Georgian prince Rostom Khan, who had come to conquer Kartli and Kakheti at the head of a Persian army. David was able, for the time being, to retain his hold of Mukhrani, and endeavored to meet Rostom for negotiations at Surami, but he suspected treachery and quickly withdrew to his estate. Rostom's attempts to win him over went in vain and David rallied to his father's cause as Teimuraz, having resumed his reign in Kakheti in 1638, marched with the Kakhetian army to dislodge Rostom from Kartli in 1648. Having taken command of his father's troops, David was attacked and defeated by Rostom's Persian auxiliaries at Magharo. David himself was killed in battle at the hand of the Kazakh officer Jamal Khan. David's severed head was delivered to Rostom. Teimuraz lost the crown of Kakheti at once. Through Rostom's magnanimity, he was able to retire to his in-laws in the western Georgian kingdom of Imereti and also have his last son, David, buried at the Alaverdi Monastery.

== Family ==
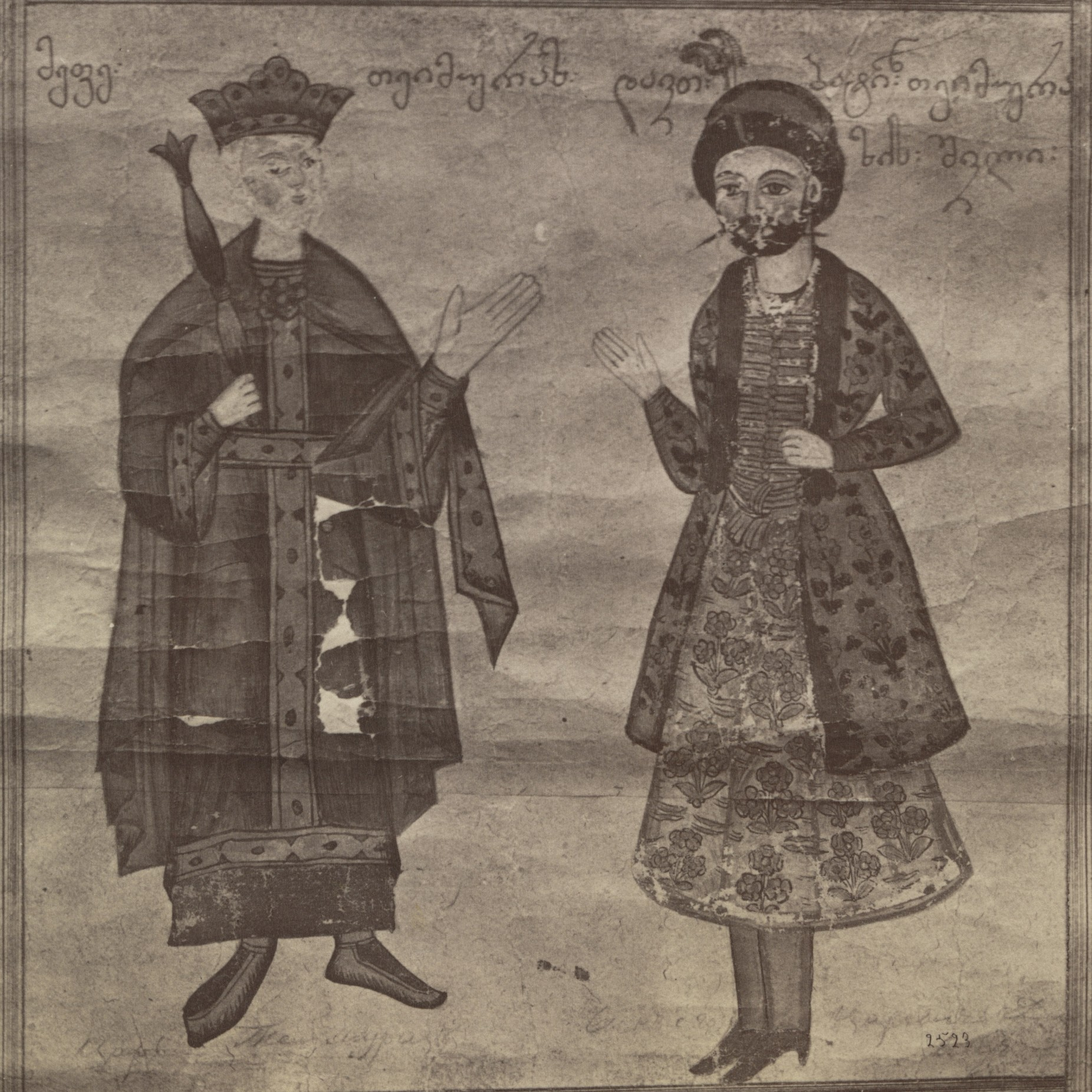
King Teimuraz I and Prince David.

David was married to Helen (died 1695), daughter of Prince Levan Diasamidze and niece of Catholicos-Patriarch Eudemus I of Georgia. Their children were:

- Prince Luarsab (died 1659);
- Heraclius I of Kakheti (died 1709), King of Kartli (r. 1688–1703) and Kakheti (r. 1703–1709);
- Prince George (died 1650/51);
- Prince Joseph;
- Princess Ketevan (died 1719), who married firstly Bagrat IV of Imereti and secondly Archil II;
- Princess Anastasia.

== Ancestry ==
Ancestors of Prince David of Kakheti

8. Alexander II of Kakheti
4. David I of Kakheti
9. Tinatin Amilakhvari
2. Teimuraz I
10. Ashotan I, Prince of Mukhrani
5. Ketevan the Martyr
1. David
12. Simon I of Kartli
6. George X
13. Nestan-Darejan of Kakheti
3. Khoreshan of Kartli
14. Giorgi I of Lipartiani
7. Tamar Lipartiani
15. Taji N.

== Bibliography ==
- Toumanoff, Cyril (1976). Manuel de Généalogie et de Chronologie pour l'histoire de la Caucasie chrétienne (Arménie, Géorgie, Albanie) [Manual of Genealogy and Chronology of Christian Caucasian History (Armenia, Georgia, Albania)] (in French). Rome: Edizioni Aquila.

Georgian royalty
Preceded by Kaikhosro	Ruler of Mukhrani; 1626–1628	Succeeded by Vakhtang II
