= Vameq III Dadiani =

Prince of Mingrelia

Vameq III
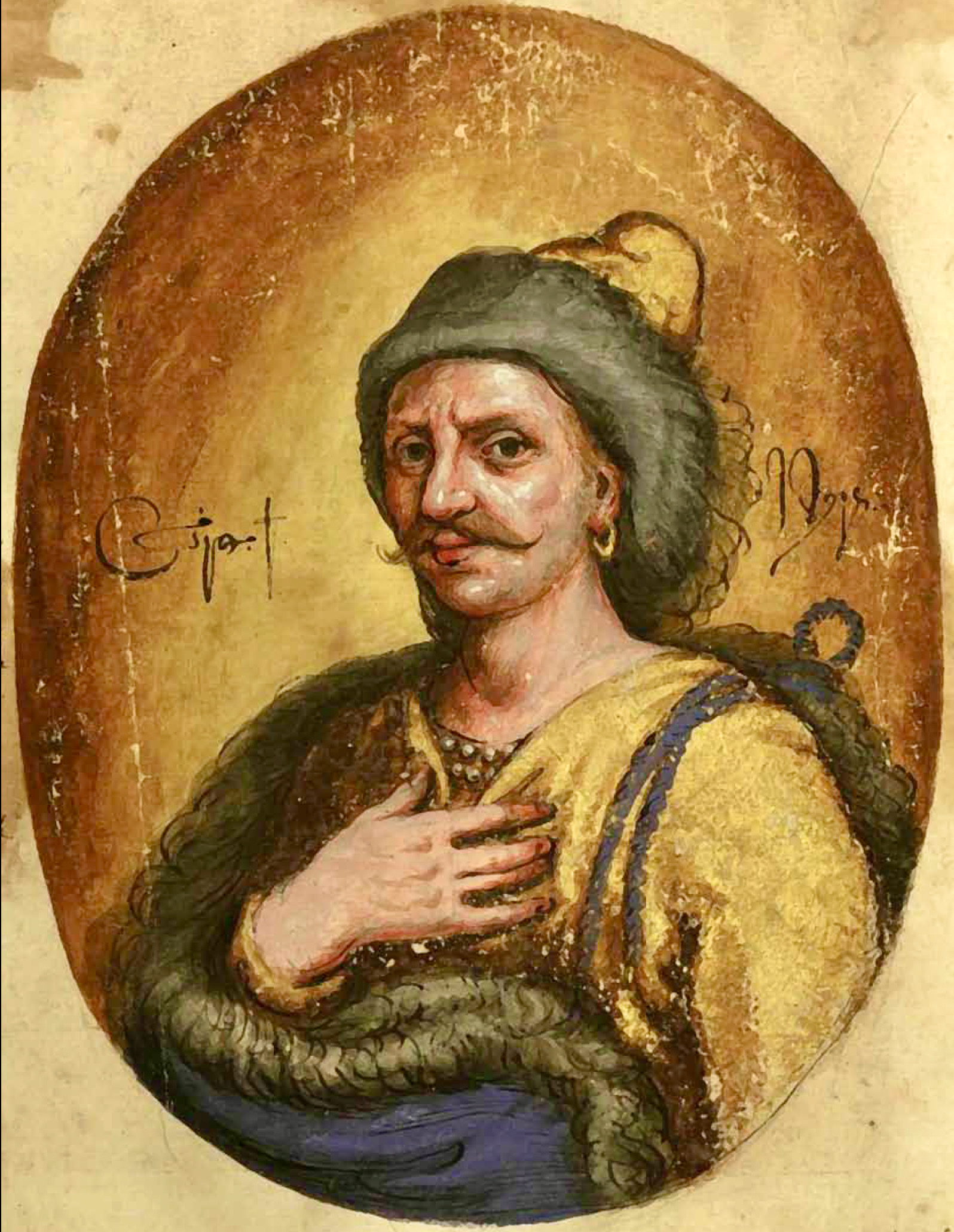
- Vameq III by Teramo Castelli

Prince of Mingrelia
- Reign: 1658—1661
- Predecessor: Liparit III Dadiani
- Successor: Levan III Dadiani

King of Imereti
- Reign: 1661
- Predecessor: Vakhtang Tchutchunashvili
- Successor: Archil II
- Died: 1661
- Spouse: Helen Gurieli
- Issue: Bagrat; George; Darejan
- House: Dadiani
- Father: George I Lipartiani
- Mother: Ana Dadiani
- Religion: Georgian Orthodox Church (Catholicate of Abkhazia)
- Khelrtva

Vameq III Dadiani (Georgian: ვამეყ III დადიანი; died 1661) was Prince of Mingrelia, of the House of Dadiani, from 1658 until being deposed in 1661. He was also briefly King of Imereti in 1661. He assumed both Mingrelian and Imeretian thrones and lost them during a messy civil war in western Georgian polities and was killed by assassins while hiding in a refuge of the mountains of Svaneti.

== Prince of Mingrelia ==
Vameq was born into the Lipartiani family, a younger line of the Dadiani dynasty of Mingrelia, which held the fief of Salipartiano in hereditary possession. Vameq was a son of George Lipartiani by his first wife Ana, probably his cousin and a daughter of George III Dadiani. Vameq succeeded to lordship of Salipartiano in 1618. In 1657, after the death of his relative, Levan II Dadiani, Vameq prevented his rival Liparit III Dadiani from becoming Mingrelia's next ruler. To his cause, Vameq was able to enlist support of King Alexander III of Imereti, but had to concede the border territory Levan II Dadiani had seized from Imereti as well as much of Levan's treasury. At the decisive battle of Bandza in June 1658, Vameq defeated his rival and secured the throne of Mingrelia.

== King of Imereti ==
In 1660, Alexander III's death occasioned a multifaceted civil war in Imereti, in which the dowager queen Darejan seized power and made her new husband, an insignificant nobleman, Vakhtang, king. The Imeretians revolted: the nobles of Lower Imereti invited Vamiq, while those of Upper Imereti appealed to King Vakhtang V, King of Kartli. Vamiq took Darejan and his husband prisoner, blinding the latter, and then declared himself king of Imereti in 1661. Darejan begged Vakhtang V for help, offering the Imeretian throne to him. The king of Kartli invaded, but stuck a deal with Vameq, dividing Imereti. The agreement was to be cemented by a marriage of Vamiq's daughter to Vakhtang's son, Archil II. However, Vameq—anxious that the marriage could eventually be used by Archil as a pretext to lay claim to Imereti—disrupted the agreement and opted for a local son-in-law, Prince Bezhan Gogoberidze. He, further, carried all of Imereti's royal treasury, twelve wagonloads, with him to Mingrelia, together with the captive queen Darejan.

Vakhtang V responded by recruiting Demetrius Gurieli, Prince of Guria, and the Upper Imeretian nobility to kill Gogoberidze. He then occupied Imereti and invaded Mingrelia, capturing Vameq's family and treasury, and forcing the defeated Dadiani into flight to the mountains of Svaneti. Vakhtang installed a loyal prince in Mingrelia, Levan III Dadiani, and then had Vameq assassinated in his mountainous refuge.

== Family ==
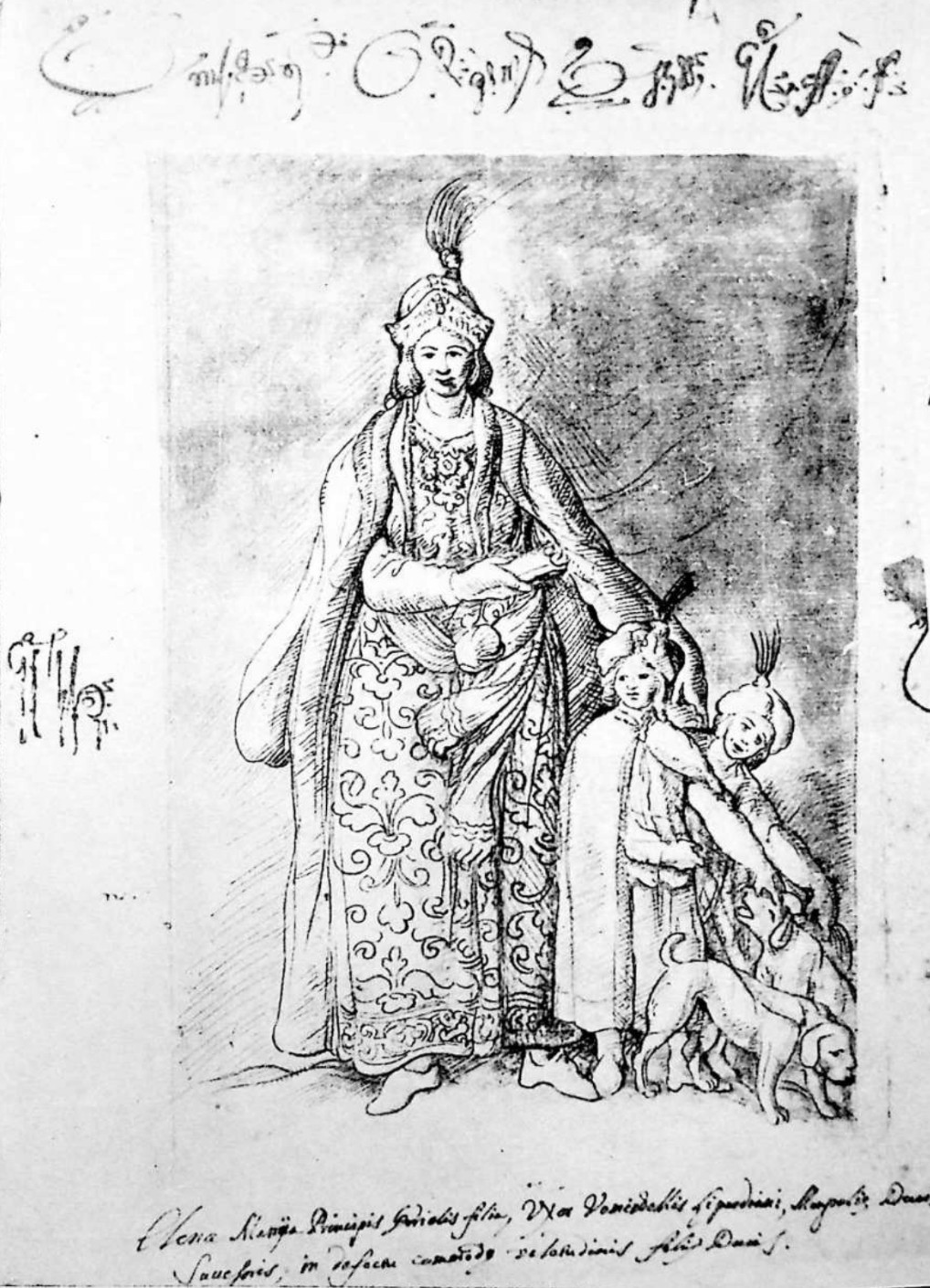
Helen Gurieli, wife of Vameq III Dadiani.

Vameq was married to Helen, daughter of Mamia II Gurieli, Prince of Guria. They had three children:

- Bagrat (died 1661);
- George, who emigrated to Russia;
- Darejan, who was betrothed to Archil II but later married Prince Bezhan Gogoberidze.

== Family ==
- Toumanoff, Cyril (1976). Manuel de Généalogie et de Chronologie pour l'histoire de la Caucasie chrétienne (Arménie, Géorgie, Albanie) [Manual of Genealogy and Chronology of Christian Caucasian History (Armenia, Georgia, Albania)] (in French). Rome: Edizioni Aquila.

Vameq III Dadiani House of Dadiani Born: ? Died: 1661
Regnal titles
Preceded by Liparit III	Prince of Mingrelia; 1658–1661	Succeeded by Levan III
Preceded by Vakhtang Tchutchunashvili	King of Imereti; 1661	Succeeded by Archil II
