= Chkhetidze =

Ancient Georgian noble family

Coat of arms of Princes Chkhotua

The House of Chkhetidze (Georgian: ჩხეტიძე) was an ancient Georgian noble family known in West Georgia from the tenth century. Members of the family held the title of Knyaz in the Russian Empire, granted to them in 1850 and 1861. The oldest known representative is Germain Chkhetidze, Archbishop-Metropolitan of Bedia in 999.

== Family lines ==
- The Princes Chkheidze (ჩხეიძე) in Imereti, confirmed in the princely title under the Russian Empire in 1850 and 1861.
- The Eristavi of Racha (ერისთავი რაჭისა), later entitled as Princes Eristov of Racha under the Russian rule in 1850. They ruled the Duchy of Racha from c. 1488 to 1768.
- The Princes Chkhotua or Tchkhotua (Chkotua; ჩხოტუა, ჩქოტუა) in Mingrelia and Abkhazia, elevated to the princely rank of the Russian Empire in 1901. The Grand Duke Cyril authorised the transfer of the name and title via the female line to a branch of the Chqonia/Chkonia, a feudal family from Guria (later belonging to the hereditary Russian nobility) in emigration on 26 July 1938.

== See also ==
- Chkheidze, Georgian last name derived from the name of the noble family
