= Simon of Imereti =

Simon

King of Imereti
- Reign: 1698–1701
- Predecessor: Archil II
- Successor: Mamia III Gurieli
- Died: 1701
- Spouse: Ana Abashidze (m. 1698; div. 1698) Unnamed daughter of George III Gurieli (m. 1698)
- Dynasty: Bagrationi
- Father: Alexander IV of Imereti
- Mother: Daughter of a didebuli
- Religion: Georgian Orthodox Church (Catholicate of Abkhazia)

Simon of Imereti (Georgian: სიმონი; died 1701), of the Bagrationi dynasty, was King (Mepe) of Imereti from 1698 to 1701.

== Biography ==
An illegitimate son of Alexander IV of Imereti, he was brought up at the court of Heraclius I of Kakheti, while Imereti was embroiled in the civil war among several claimants to the throne. In 1698, the Ottoman government sponsored a coup against King Archil II and installed Simon as king. The latter married Anika, daughter of the powerful prince Giorgi-Malakia Abashidze, but soon the prince and his second daughter Princess Tamar Abashidze (widow of Alexander IV) expelled Simon back to Kartli. With the support of Mamia III Gurieli, Prince of Guria, Simon managed to stage a comeback and married Mamia's sister. However, Prince Abashidze promised Mamia the Imeretian crown and had Simon assassinated in his palace in 1701. Simon's death and the continuing power struggle in Imereti would trigger an Ottoman invasion of western Georgia in 1703.

| Preceded by Archil II | King of Imereti; 1698–1701 | Succeeded by Mamia III Gurieli |
