= Vakhtang of Imereti =

Georgian nobleman (died 1668)

Vakhtang Tchutchunashvili (Georgian: ვახტანგ ჭუჭუნაშვილი; died 1668) was a Georgian nobleman who ruled the crown of Imereti, western Georgia, in the years of 1660–1661 and 1668.

== Biography ==
In 1660, the Queen Dowager Darejan, the widow of Alexander III of Imereti, deposed and blinded her stepson, the legitimate king Bagrat IV. Darejan then married Tchutchunashvili, a petty Georgian noble who claimed to be of Bagration descent, whom she installed as king of Imereti. Deposed by Prince Vameq III Dadiani of Mingrelia and other nobles with Ottoman support, Darejan and Vakhtang fled to Akhaltsikhe, in the Ottoman-held Georgian province. Tchutchunashvili was restored by the pasha of Akhaltsikhe in 1668. According to various accounts, he was murdered with his wife Darejan at the palace of Kutaisi.

Preceded by Bagrat IV	King of Imereti; 1660–1661, 1668	Succeeded by Bagrat IV
