= Bagrat IV of Imereti =

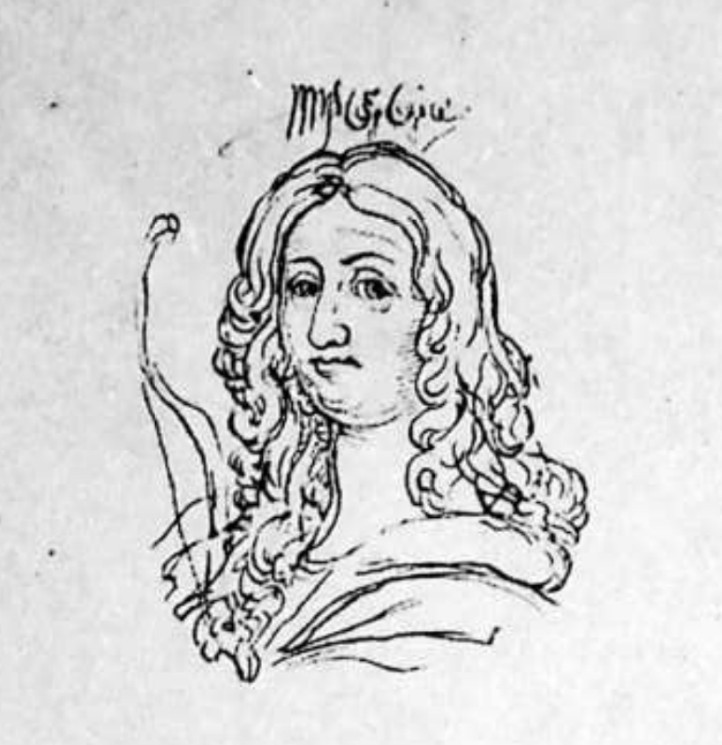
- King Bagrat by Teramo Castelli

King of Imereti
- 1st reign: 1660
- Predecessor: Alexander III
- Successor: Vakhtang
- 2nd reign: 1663–1668
- Predecessor: Demetrius Gurieli
- Successor: Vakhtang
- 3rd reign: 1668–1678
- Predecessor: Vakhtang
- Successor: Archil II
- 4th reign: 1679–1681
- Predecessor: Archil II
- Successor: George III Gurieli
- Born: 1620
- Died: 1681 (aged 60–61)
- Spouse: Ketevan of Kakheti (m. 1660; div. 1660) Tatia of Mukhrani (m. 1661; div. 1663) Tamar of Mukhrani (m. 1663)
- Issue: Alexander IV of Imereti (ill.); Princess Mariam (ill.); Princess Darejan; Prince George; Princess Tinatin
- Dynasty: Bagrationi
- Father: Alexander III of Imereti
- Mother: Tamar Gurieli
- Religion: Georgian Orthodox Church (Catholicate of Abkhazia)

Bagrat IV (Georgian: ბაგრატ IV; 1620–1681), of the Bagrationi dynasty, was a king (mepe) of Imereti, whose troubled reign in the years of 1660–61, 1663–68, 1669–78, and 1679–81, was marked by extreme instability and feudal anarchy in the kingdom.

== Reign ==
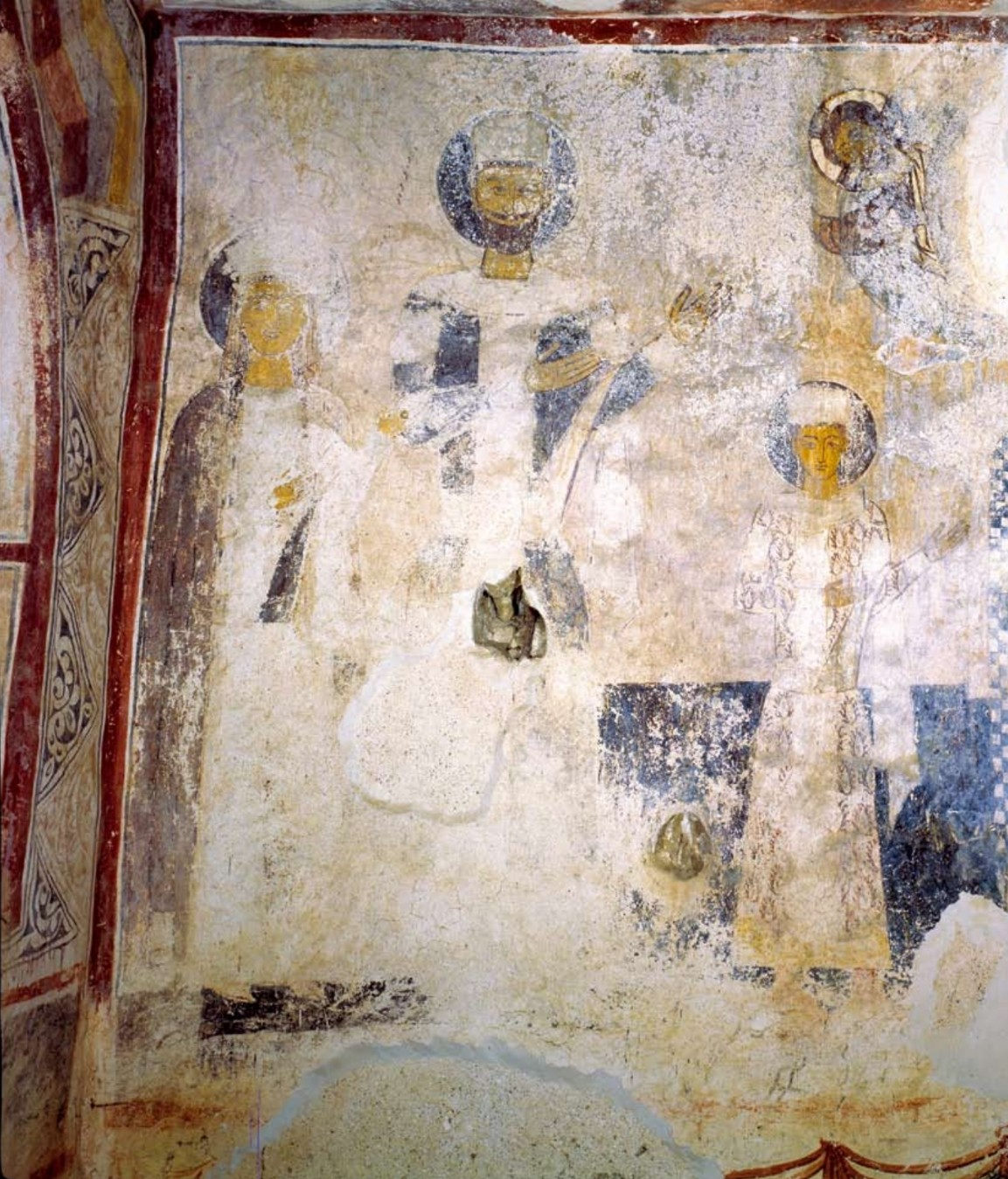
A fresco at Gelati Monastery possibly depicting King Bagrat V of Imereti, his wife Queen Tamar of Mukhrani, and his young son, Alexander IV.

The eldest son of Alexander III of Imereti by his first wife, Princess Tamar Gurieli, the daughter of Mamia II Gurieli, Prince of Guria. Bagrat IV succeeded as King on his father's death in 1660. His influential stepmother Darejan made him marry her niece, Ketevan. However, Darejan disrupted the union a year later and offered Bagrat herself as a bride. On the king's refusal, Darejan had him arrested and blinded. The queen dowager then remarried an insignificant aristocrat, Vakhtang Tchutchunashvili, and had him crowned as king. The move drew many nobles into opposition. They enlisted the Ottoman and Mingrelian support and restored Bagrat. Darejan was exiled to Akhaltsikhe, in the Ottoman-held Georgian province.

In 1668, Bagrat was once again dethroned by Darejan's party with the military support of the pasha of Akhaltsikhe. However, both Darejan and her favorite were soon murdered, and Bagrat reclaimed the crown in 1668. The royal court had closely watched these events in Tbilisi, eastern Georgia. King Vakhtang V, whose cooperation with the Persian suzerains allowed him to bring the whole of eastern Georgia under his control, campaigned in Imereti and crowned his son Archil II as king of Imereti in 1678. Under pressure from the Ottomans, however, Archil was soon recalled from Kutaisi, and Bagrat was replaced on the throne again in 1679.

== Family ==
Bagrat was married three times. His first marriage, in 1660, was to Ketevan, daughter of Prince David of Kakheti. The marriage was dissolved after Bagrat lost the throne. Later that same year, he married Titia, daughter of Constantine I, Prince of Mukhrani. He subsequently divorced Titia and married her sister Tamar, having first arranged Tamar’s divorce from her husband, Levan III Dadiani, to whom he gave his own sister in marriage.

Bagrat’s children were:

- Alexander IV of Imereti (died 1695), born from Bagrat’s adulterous relationship with the wife of a Lechkhumian man named Kochila. He reigned as King of Imereti (r. 1783–1790, 1791–1795);
- Princess Mariam (died 1726), an illegitimate daughter; she was married first to Prince Jesse Chikovani (fl. 1681–1703), and subsequently to Shoshita III Chkheidze, Duke of Racha (died 1729);
- Princess Darejan, born to Tamar of Mukhrani; she was married successively to Prince George III Gurieli, Prince Paata Abashidze, and Papuna II Chkheidze, Duke of Racha;
- Prince George (1676–1678), born to Tamar of Mukhrani; he died young;
- Princess Tinatin (1678–1760), born to Tamar of Mukhrani; she married Prince Levan IV Dadiani. In 1704, she became a nun under the name Nino, and in 1724 accompanied the court of Vakhtang VI into exile in the Russian Empire.

Preceded by Alexander III	King of Imereti; 1660	Succeeded by Vakhtang Tchutchunashvili
Preceded by Demetrius Gurieli	King of Imereti; 1664–1668	Succeeded by Vakhtang Tchutchunashvili
Preceded by Vakhtang Tchutchunashvili	King of Imereti; 1668–1678	Succeeded by Archil II
Preceded by Archil II	King of Imereti; 1679–1681	Succeeded by George IV (George III Gurieli)
