= Diasamidze =

The Diasamidze family coat of arms

The House of Diasamidze (Georgian: დიასამიძე) was an old Georgian noble family known from 1443, later incorporated later into the Russian nobility.

== History ==
The family held a fiefdom around Aspindza in Samtskhe (southern part of the Georgian Kingdom), and later acquired the former possessions of the houses of Abuserisdze and Khursidze. After the fragmentation of the Kingdom of Georgia, they allied with the kings of Kartli, namely Luarsab I in 1548, in their effort to prevent Samtskhe from being lost to the Safavid dynasty of Iran. In 1553, the shah of Iran, Tahmasp I, retaliated with the crackdown on the family, deporting several of its members to Iran. Later, between 1576 and 1578, the Diasamidze conspired against the Jakeli, a ruling house of Samtskhe, which eventually surrendered the province to the Ottoman Empire in 1578. These changes forced several members of the family to remove to Kartli and Kakheti at the end of the 16th century. During the 16th and 17th century, the line in Kartli frequently held the offices of Chief Bailiff of Mtskheta, Catholicos of Kartli, and abbot of the Monastery of the Holy Cross of Mtskheta; while the line in Kakheti were active at the Bodbe Monastery. In the 1630s, the Diasamidze family, including Catholicos Eudemus I, was involved in a coup attempt against the pro-Iranian king Rostom of Kartli. After the failure of the coup, the Diasamidze house was dispossessed of some of their estates and went into decline.

Under the Russian rule, the Diasamidze were recognized as princes of the Russian Empire according to the decree of 1850.
