= Archil II =

King of Imereti and Kakheti (1647–1713)

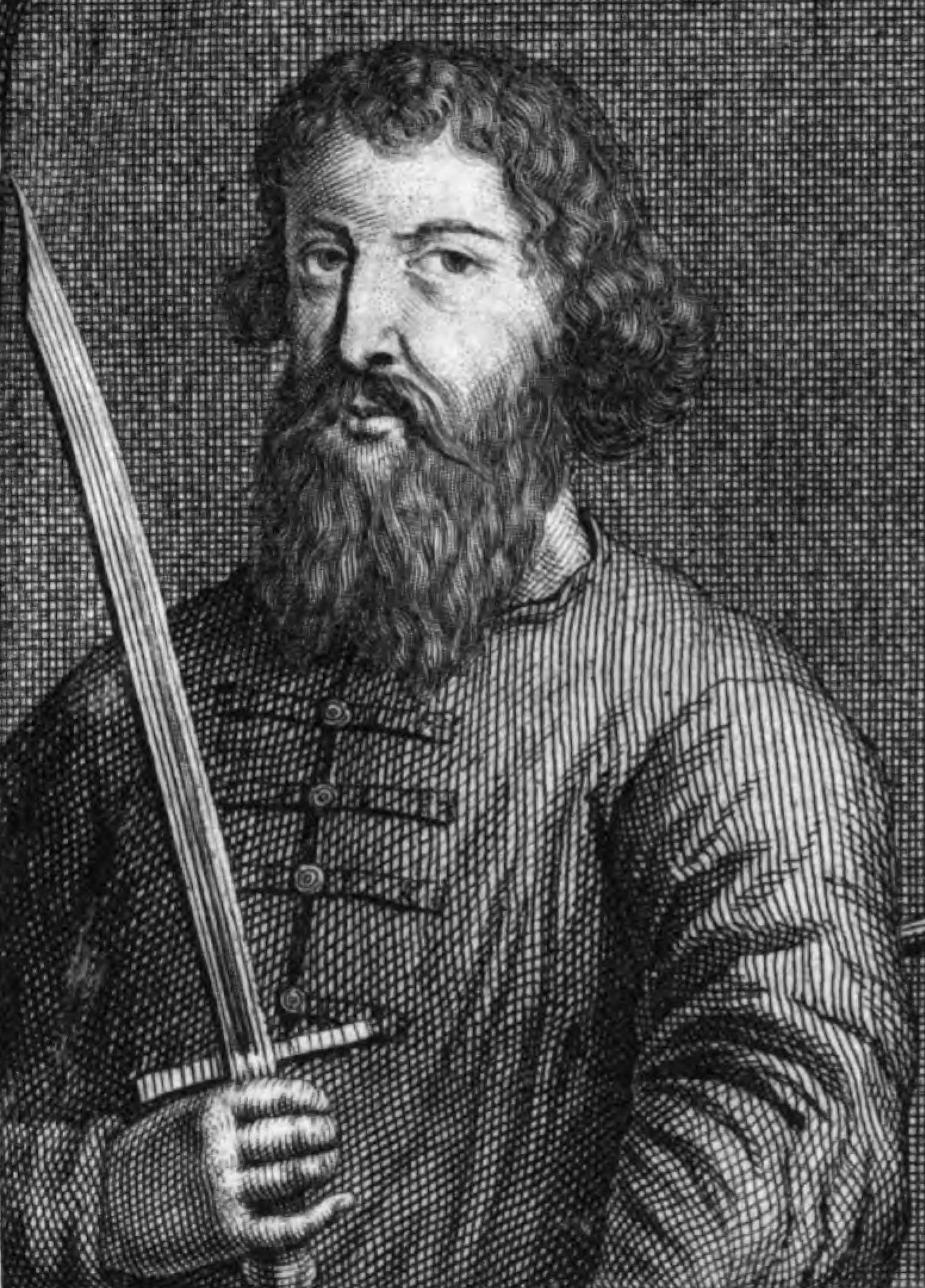
- King Archil II by Nicolaes Witsen.

King of Imereti
- 1st reign: 1661–1663
- Predecessor: Vameq III Dadiani
- Successor: Demetrius Gurieli

King of Kakheti
- Reign: 1664–1675
- Predecessor: Interregnum
- Successor: Interregnum

King of Imereti
- 2nd reign: 1678–1679
- Predecessor: Bagrat IV
- Successor: Bagrat IV
- 3rd reign: 1690–1691
- Predecessor: Alexander IV
- Successor: Alexander IV
- 4th reign: 1695–1696
- Predecessor: Alexander IV
- Successor: George IV
- 5th reign: 1698
- Predecessor: George IV
- Successor: Simon
- Born: 1647
- Died: 16 April 1713 (aged 65–66); Moscow
- Burial: Donskoy Monastery
- Spouse: Ketevan of Kakheti (m. 1668)
- Issue: Princess Darejan; Prince Alexander; Prince Mamuka; Prince David
- Dynasty: Bagrationi
- Father: Vakhtang V
- Mother: Rodam Qaplanishvili
- Religion: Georgian Orthodox Church Royal seal

- Khelrtva

Archil II (Georgian: არჩილ II; 1647 – April 16, 1713), of Bagrationi dynasty, king (mepe) of Imereti in western Georgia (1661–1663, 1678–1679, 1690–1691, 1695–1696, and 1698) and of Kakheti in eastern Georgia (1664–75). After a series of unsuccessful attempts to establish himself on the throne of Imereti, Archil retired to Russia where he spearheaded the cultural life of a local Georgian community. He was also a lyric poet.

== Political career ==
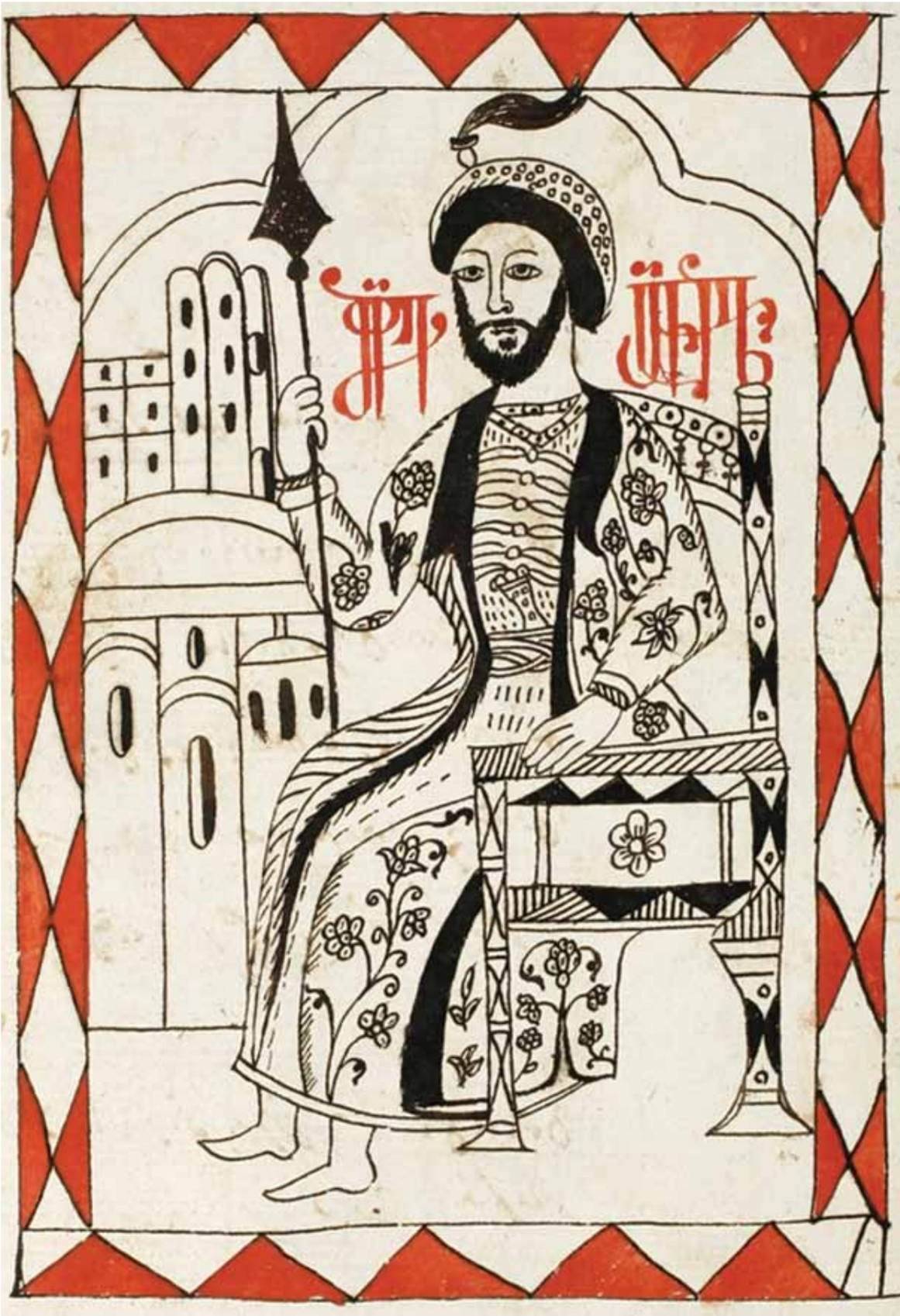
Archil, miniature from an 18th century manuscript.

Archil was the son of King Vakhtang V, who, under the Persian protection, attempted to reunify a fragmented Kingdom of Georgia under his crown. His mother was Rodam Kaplanishvili-Orbeliani. Having brought the neighboring eastern kingdom of Kakheti under his control, his father marched into western Georgia in 1661, deposed King Bagrat IV of Imereti, and crowned his fourteen-year-old son Archil king at Kutaisi, capital of Imereti. The Ottoman government strongly objected to what it considered a Persian-inspired incursion into the Turkish zone of influence. A Turkish ultimatum was soon received in Isfahan, threatening a declaration of war if Vakhtang V maintained his son on the throne of western Georgia. Vakhtang was forced to recall Archil from Kutaisi in 1663 and to restore the rightful king, Bagrat. Instead, Vakhtang installed Archil as king of Kakheti in 1664. To gain the shah's consent, Archil was prevailed upon, much against his will, to become a nominal convert to Islam, assuming the title of Shah-Nazar-Khan. In 1664, Archil defeated an attempt by the rival Kakhetian prince and his brother-in-law, Heraclius, to regain his father's crown, and achieved a degree of stability and prosperity in Kakheti.

In 1675, however, due largely to the intrigues by the Persian grand vizier Shaykh Ali Khan Zanganeh, Archil abandoned Kakheti and, with his brother Luarsab, defected to the Turkish frontier pasha of Akhaltsikhe who promised him the crown of Imereti. He was soon reestablished in Kutaisi with the aid of the pasha of Akhaltiskhe, though without the consent of the Sublime Porte. The Ottoman agents had the pasha executed, and deposed Archil in 1679. He fled to Russia, but was not allowed to Moscow until 1686. Encouraged by his brother, King George XI, Archil returned to Georgia in 1690 and succeeded in regaining the Imeretian throne, only to be deposed again by the local nobility in 1691. During the next few years, he made several attempts to seize the crown, waging a guerrilla war against the Turks and the aristocratic opposition led by Prince Abashidze. Eventually Archil gave up hope of reestablishing himself in Imereti and, in 1699, crossed the Caucasus Mountains once more into Russia where he settled in Vsesviatskoye near Moscow.

== Life in Russia ==
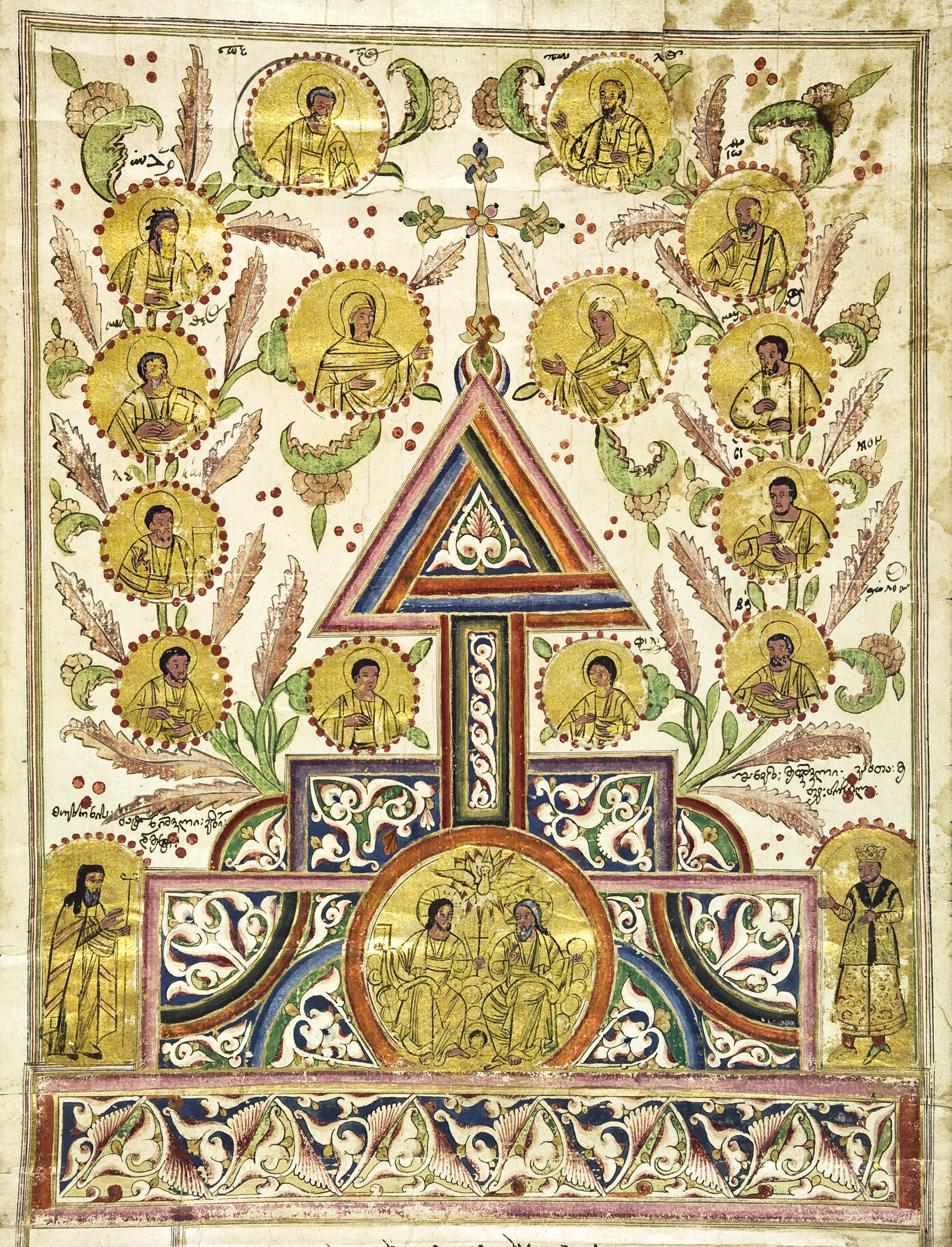
An illuminated charter issued by Archil II.

He was on friendly terms with Peter I of Russia who gave orders to prepare an expedition to restore Archil to the throne of Imereti. However, the plan was rendered abortive on account of the defeat inflicted by the Swedes on the Russian army at Narva in 1700. This, in addition to frustrating Archil's hopes of regaining his throne, brought tragedy into his family life. Alexander, son of Archil, who commanded Russian artillery at Narva, was taken prisoner by the Swedes, and had to spend ten years in captivity. Archil attempted to achieve the release of his son through the Austrian mediation, and later sent a personal letter to Charles XII of Sweden. It was not until 1710, however, that Alexander was released. Severely ill, he died on his way back to Russia. The death of Alexander was a bitter blow to Archil, who did not long survive his son. He died in 1713 and was buried in the Donskoy Monastery at Moscow.

Most of Archil's Russian years were devoted to poetry and cultural activities. He was responsible for setting up the first printing press in the Georgian language in Russia and published The Psalms in 1705. Archil's poetry, remarkable for its diversity, heralded the beginning of the period of Revival in Georgian literature. His chief poems – The Dialogue between Teimuraz and Rustveli (გაბაასება თეიმურაზისა და რუსთველისა), The Manners of Georgia (საქართველოს ზნეობანი), and The Lay of Archil (Archiliani; არჩილიანი) are dedicated to the 17th-century misfortunes of Georgia. He strongly objected to the contemporary Persian literary influences, and called for the revival of Shota Rustaveli's traditions of Georgian poetry. Thus, Archil's poems were closer to traditional Georgian metre, and his idioms closer to Georgian speech. However, despite his efforts to "stem the tide of Persianization", Archil's poems included "conceits, forms, and themes inspired by Persia", and his own version of the Alexander romance was modeled on the versions of Nizami Ganjavi and Jami.

== Family ==
Archil was married twice. His first wife was a daughter of Prince Nodar Tsitsishvili. He married secondly to Ketevan, daughter of Prince David of Kakheti, in 1668. The couple had one daughter and three sons:

- Princess Darejan (1670 – 1740); she died unmarried and was buried at the Donskoy Monastery.
- Prince Alexander (1674 – 20 February 1711), a Russian army artillery commander. He was married, with one daughter.
- Prince Mamuka (1676 – 23 March 1693); he died unmarried and was buried at the Donskoy Monastery.
- Prince David (2 July 1682 – 24 October 1688); he died unmarried, buried at the Novodevichy Convent, and reburied in 1711 at the Donskoy Monastery.

== Sources ==
- (in Russian) Вахушти Багратиони (Vakhushti Bagrationi) (1745). История Царства Грузинского: Жизнь Имерети.
- Gould, Rebecca Ruth (2018). "Sweetening the Heavy Georgian Tongue: Jāmī in the Georgian-Persianate World". In d'Hubert, Thibaut; Papas, Alexandre (eds.). Jāmī in Regional Contexts: The Reception of ʿAbd al-Raḥmān Jāmī's Works in the Islamicate World, ca. 9th/15th-14th/20th Century. Brill. ISBN 978-9004386600.
- David Marshall Lang, The Last Years of the Georgian Monarchy, 1658-1832. New York: Columbia University Press, 1957.
- Rayfield, Donald (2000), The Literature of Georgia: A History. Routledge, ISBN 0-7007-1163-5.
- Rota, Giorgio (2017). "Conversion to Islam (and sometimes a return to Christianity) in Safavid Persia in the sixteenth and seventeenth centuries". In Norton, Claire (ed.). Conversion and Islam in the Early Modern Mediterranean: The Lure of the Other. Routledge. ISBN 978-1317159797.

Preceded by Vameq III Dadiani	King of Imereti; 1661–1663	Succeeded by Demetrius Gurieli
Preceded by Interregnum	King of Kakheti; 1664–1675	Succeeded by Interregnum
Preceded by Bagrat IV	King of Imereti; 1678–1679	Succeeded by Bagrat IV
Preceded by Alexander IV	King of Imereti; 1690–1691	Succeeded by Alexander IV
Preceded by Alexander IV	King of Imereti; 1695–1696	Succeeded by George IV
Preceded by George IV	King of Imereti; 1698	Succeeded by Simon
