= Georgian civil war of 1623–1658 =

Georgian civil war
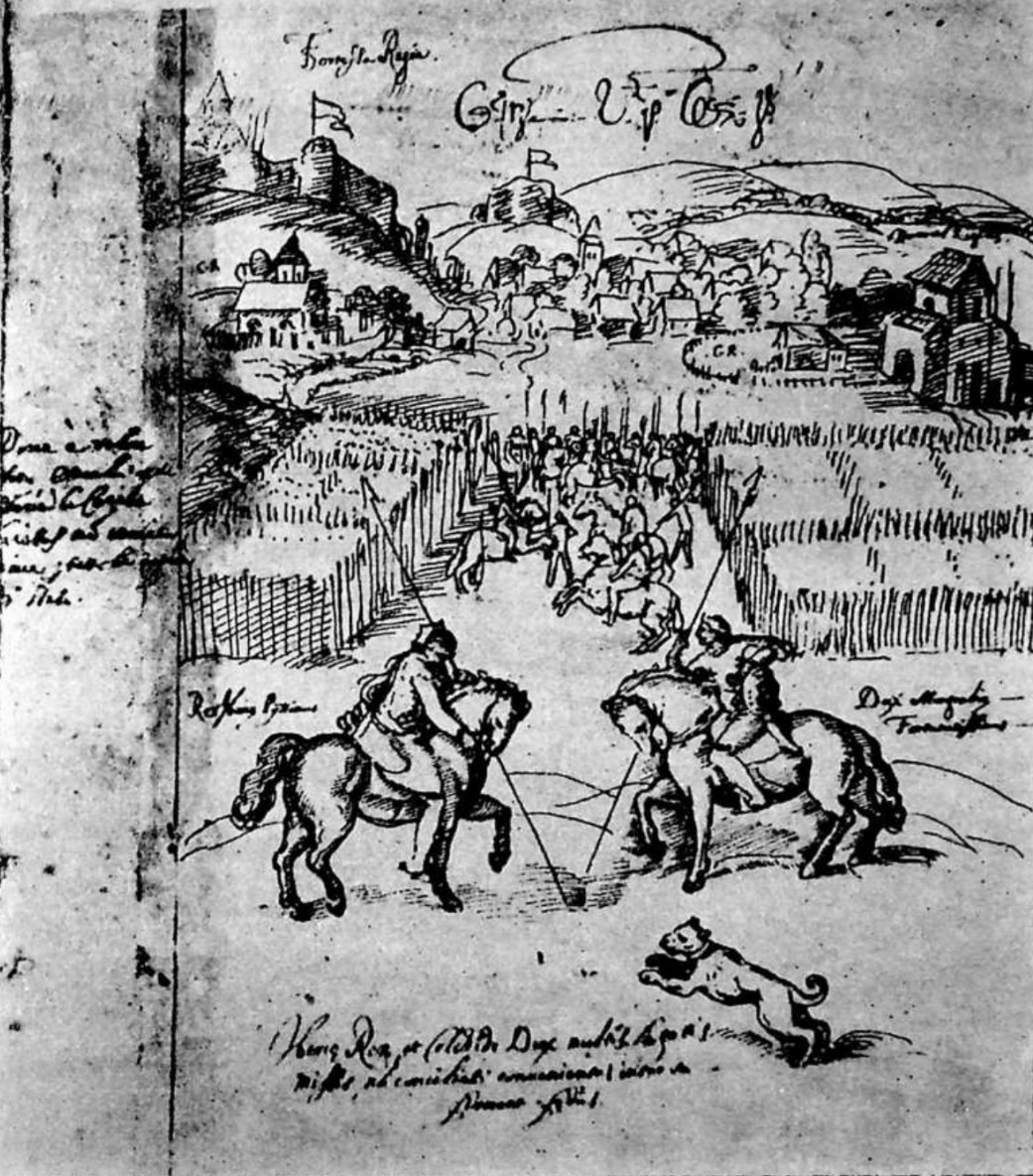
- Reconciliation between George III of Imereti and King Levan II Dadiani.
Date	1623–1658
Location	Western Georgia
Result	Imeretian victory

Belligerents
Kingdom of Imereti; Salipartiano (since 1657)	Principality of Mingrelia; Principality of Guria; Principality of Abkhazia; Supported by: Kingdom of Kartli; (Ottoman Empire) Childir Eyalet

Commanders and leaders
George III; Alexander III; Prince Mamuka (POW); Simon II Gurieli (POW); Vameq III Dadiani; Demetrius Gurieli	Levan II Dadiani; Liparit III Dadiani; Mamia II Gurieli; Malakia I Gurieli; Vakhtang II Gurieli; Kaikhosro I Gurieli

The Georgian civil war of 1623–1658 (Georgian: 1623–1658 წლების ქართული სამოქალაქო ომი) was a military conflict in Western Georgia that lasted for nearly thirty-five years during the 17th century and involved various Georgian kingdoms and principalities. The war pitted the principality of Mingrelia, ruled by the powerful Levan II Dadiani, against the Kingdom of Imereti, its formal suzerain and one of the three Georgian monarchies under the branch of royal Bagrationi dynasty. House of Dadiani under Levan II, supported by several local nobles, sought domination over Western Georgia and challenged the authority of the Bagrationi dynasty, which had ruled Georgia since the 9th century.

Although several smaller campaigns were associated with the broader conflict—such as Dadiani's invasions of Abkhazia and Guria—the war was primarily fought between Mingrelia and Imereti, ruled successively by Kings George III (until 1639) and Alexander III (until the end of the conflict).

Mingrelia's early successes drew the attention of foreign powers, notably Safavid Iran. Through a network of political alliances, a Mingrelian victory could have led to the unification of Georgia under the rule of the Safavid vassal Rostom of Kartli, who financed Dadiani's military efforts. However, the withdrawal of Safavid support, the formation of an alliance between Russia and Imereti, and the sudden death of the Mingrelian prince shifted the balance of power. The conflict ultimately concluded with a decisive Imeretian victory at the Battle of Bandza, restoring royal authority over Western Georgia.

== Background ==
The division of Georgia from the 16th century onwards saw western Georgia become particularly fragmented.

Since 1490, Georgia has been divided into three independent and weakened kingdoms: Kartli, Kakheti, and Imereti. These three states were ruled by distant branches of the Bagrationi dynasty, but the imperial ambitions of the Safavid and Ottoman empires, combined with repeated attempts to reunify the Georgian nation under a single crown, led to significant political instability over the following decades. Among the three kingdoms, Imereti was the most affected by internal divisions.

Beginning with the reign of Bagrat III of Imereti, the noble vassals of the realm gradually gained power. The principalities of Guria and Mingrelia achieved de facto political independence, though they remained loosely tied to the central government in Kutaisi through the Catholicate of Abkhazia. This arrangement helped prevent their full annexation by the Ottoman Empire.

Following a series of succession disputes over the Imeretian crown at the end of the 16th century, the central government was considerably weakened. The kings retained control only over the capital and its immediate surroundings, while the Dadiani family of Mingrelia and the Gurieli family of Guria expanded their influence, forged marital alliances, and increased their wealth.

In 1611, Levan II Dadiani became Prince of Mingrelia. Educated at the court of the King of Kakheti, he soon proved to be an ambitious ruler, breaking away from the pacifist policies of his father, Manuchar I.

== The War ==
=== Alliance of the Nobles ===
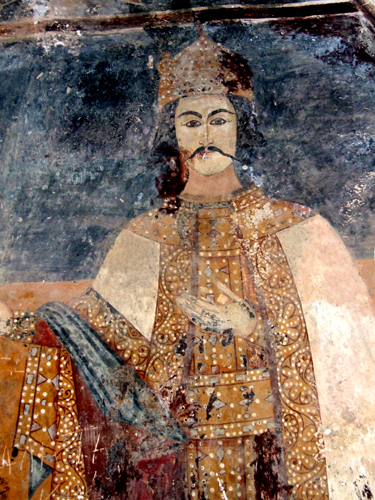
Levan II Dadiani, Prince of Mingrelia.

The early 17th century was marked by a growing movement among several Georgian nobles to reunify the country under a single crown, though uncertainty persisted regarding who the rightful heir to a united throne should be. During the Safavid invasion of Eastern Georgia in 1614, King Teimuraz I of Kakheti sought refuge in Imereti, where the court at Kutaisi attempted to rally its vassals to reconquer the territories occupied by Persia.

This policy of unity culminated in 1618, when Mamia II Gurieli, Prince of Guria, arranged the marriage of his daughter Tamar to the Imeretian crown prince Alexander, who was only nine years old at the time.

However, the fragile alliance soon collapsed. In 1620, Tamar was accused of adultery and subsequently sent back to Guria, provoking the anger of her father. Levan II Dadiani seized the opportunity to forge a close alliance among the major nobles of Western Georgia. In 1621, he married Tamunia Sharvashidze, daughter of Prince Seteman of Abkhazia, and sent his sister Mariam Dadiani to Guria to marry Simon Gurieli, son of Prince Mamia II. These dynastic unions laid the foundation for an ambitious political alliance among the western Georgian aristocracy, which soon turned against King George III of Imereti.

=== Early Conflicts ===
Within a few months, Levan II Dadiani raised a large army, gathering troops from Guria, Mingrelia, and Abkhazia, as well as from the mountainous region of Svaneti and the distant Muslim province of Jiketi on the shores of the Black Sea. Controlling the entire coastline, the rebel princes imposed an economic blockade on the Kingdom of Imereti, causing famine in Kutaisi, the royal capital.

Meanwhile, the high noble Paata Tsulukidze, a close ally of King George III, betrayed his sovereign and defected to Mingrelia, where he became the vizier of Levan II.

To suppress the rebellion, King George III gathered his forces and launched an offensive against Dadiani in the winter of 1623. On 9 December, the opposing armies clashed near the village of Gochouri, where the royal troops were defeated. Following the loss, George III retreated to his capital, while many Imeretian soldiers were taken hostage by the rebels until the king paid a ransom for their release.

This incident marked the first recorded instance of hostage-taking among enemy combatants in Georgia since the Mongol invasions of the 13th century. The practice subsequently re-emerged on Georgian battlefields as a profitable custom, persisting throughout the seventeenth century.

=== Abkhazian–Mingrelian conflict ===
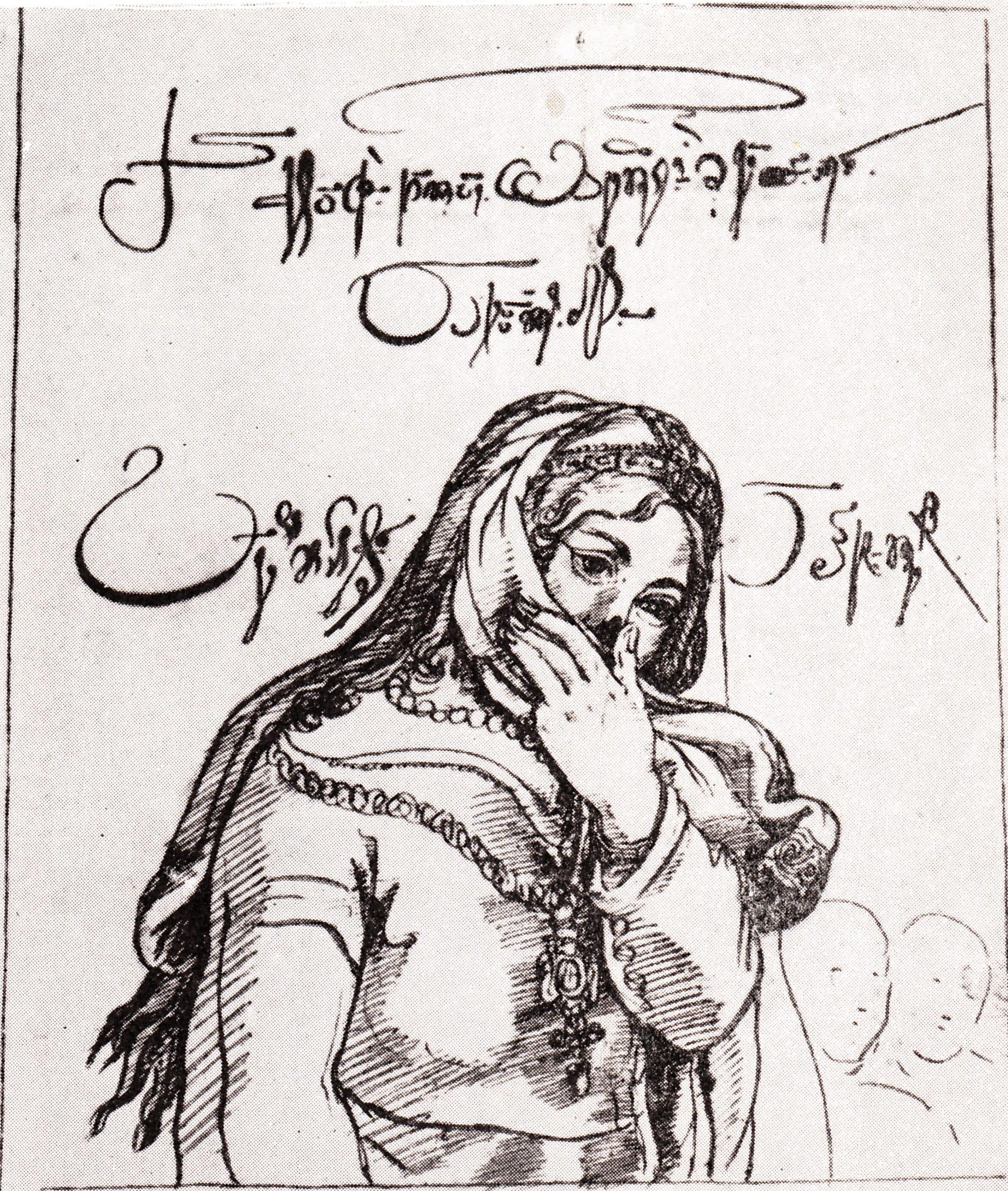
Levan's first wife Tamunia Sharvashidze after her mutilation by him (drawing by Teramo Castelli).

Shortly after his victory in Mingrelia, Levan II Dadiani continued his military expansion by turning against his western allies, the Abkhazians. Accusing his wife, Tamunia Sharvashidze, of adultery with his vizier Paata Tsulukidze, he ordered that her nose and ears be cut off and placed Tsulukidze under the custody of the Prince of Guria. With his army, Dadiani escorted Tamunia to Abkhazia and ravaged the territories of her father, imprisoning both of his sons in the process.

As long as Princess Tamunia's alleged adultery remained unknown to the public, the motives behind the invasion were unclear, and relations between Abkhazia and Mingrelia deteriorated sharply thereafter. Around 1625, Levan II survived an assassination attempt when an Abkhazian assailant stabbed him in the back; in retaliation, he launched a second invasion of Abkhazia. This time, Mingrelian troops seized falcons and hunting dogs from the region, aiming to undermine the Abkhazian nobility's hunting-based economy.

A prolonged guerrilla conflict along the frontier forced Mingrelia to divert troops to defend its borders. To resolve these ongoing hostilities, Levan Dadiani reportedly mobilized the entire Mingrelian labor force to construct a 65-kilometre wall along the Abkhazian–Mingrelian border, according to historian Donald Rayfield. The wall, extending from the Black Sea to the mountains of Circassia, was guarded by musketeers, marking the beginning of Abkhazia's gradual isolation and its increasing incorporation into the Ottoman Empire’s sphere of influence.

It is unlikely that King George III of Imereti played any significant role in the Abkhazian–Mingrelian conflict, given the weakened state of the central government. This lack of coordination has led many historians to describe the civil war as a period of chaos in Western Georgia, during which the anti-royalist allies turned against one another.

=== Gurian–Mingrelian conflict ===
The expansionist policy of Mingrelia soon alarmed the neighboring principality of Guria. Governed by the powerful house of Gurieli, Guria had initially been one of Levan II Dadiani’s closest allies during the early stages of the rebellion against Imereti, although its military participation remained limited. In 1625, after invading Abkhazia following the betrayal of his vizier Paata Tsulukidze, the Mingrelian ruler sent the captive vizier to Mamia II Gurieli, who subsequently imprisoned him.

However, Mamia II was later assassinated by his son, Simon II Gurieli, under mysterious circumstances. The new prince—married to Dadiani’s sister—released Tsulukidze and supported him in plotting a coup against Levan in favor of the latter’s younger brother, Iese Dadiani. The attempt failed: the former vizier was executed, Iese Dadiani’s estates were seized by Levan II, and Mingrelia began preparing for an invasion of Guria.

Levan II used the act of parricide as a pretext for war, sending an ultimatum to Simon Gurieli that read:

“Since you have killed your father, I no longer wish to be your brother-in-law. Return my sister to me.”

Guria was swiftly defeated by Levan Dadiani, who captured Simon I in 1626 and installed his cousin Kaikhosro Gurieli on the throne. Kaikhosro became a loyal vassal of Mingrelia, and it is likely that Levan II, after retrieving his sister and blinding Simon, annexed the principality—granting Kaikhosro only a nominal title. Contemporary records refer to Levan II with the title “Levan of Guria,” reflecting his dominance over the region.

=== Mingrelian Domination ===
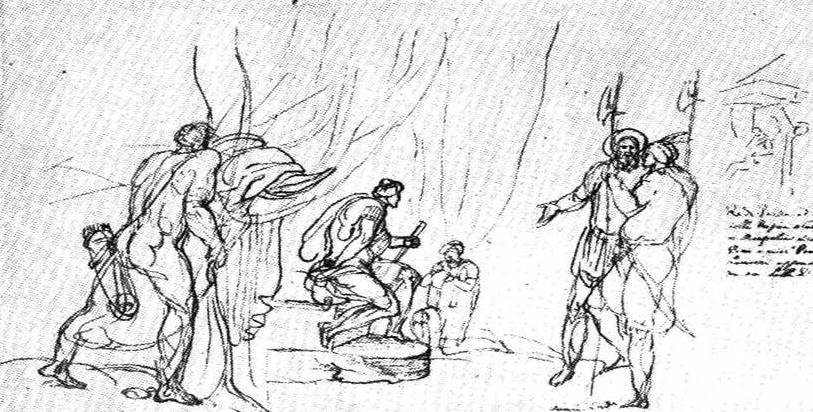
The Ambassador of Mingrelia at the court of the King of Imereti.

During the second half of the 1620s, King George III of Imereti sought to build alliances between his weakened kingdom and the powerful warlords of western Georgia. He dispatched an army from the northern part of his realm, led by the nobles Mamuka and Amilgabar Abashidze, to support the nobleman Giorgi Saakadze in his conflict with King Teimuraz I of Kakheti. Following Teimuraz's victory in 1626, George III allied himself with the Kakhetian monarch, and together they sought to unify the Georgian kingdoms under an independent and united government resistant to Muslim influence.

Beginning in 1629, Imereti came under repeated attacks from Guria, while Mingrelian forces besieged the royal capital during the wedding celebration of Crown Prince Alexander and Darejan, the daughter of King Teimuraz I of Kakheti. Despite temporary successes by the central government against the rebels, the kingdom suffered economically due to the heavy ransom payments required for the release of Imeretian soldiers captured by Levan Dadiani.

Internal warfare resurfaced in 1633 with the formation of a military alliance between Mingrelia and the Kingdom of Kartli, following the marriage of Mariam Dadiani—sister of Levan II—to King Rostom. Approved by the Safavid Empire, which granted the Mingrelian prince one and a half tons of silver, the union was part of a broader effort to unite the Georgian kingdoms under a single crown, albeit one vassal to Persia.

Following the marriage, Rostom of Kartli launched an invasion of Imereti, attempting to isolate the kingdom entirely, but his forces were repelled at the frontier by Imeretian troops. Meanwhile, Levan Dadiani was forced to march through the southern territories of Imereti to return to his domains in western Georgia.

In 1634, King George III of Imereti attempted to intercept the military convoy of Levan II Dadiani near the village of Baghdati, but his forces were swiftly defeated, and he was captured by the Mingrelians. The victors returned to Mingrelia, keeping the Imeretian monarch as their prisoner for two years.

During this period, the central government in Kutaisi, led by Crown Prince Alexander, negotiated the king's release. In exchange, Mingrelia received extensive territorial concessions belonging to the noble families of Chiladze and Mikeladze, as well as a substantial ransom in gold and silver.

Tskhenistsqali river (in red) on the map of Georgia

This exchange marked a strategic victory for Mingrelia, which expanded its control eastward beyond the Tskhenistsqali river, a natural boundary between the two Georgian states. Encouraged by this success, Levan Dadiani launched further offensives, seizing most of western Imereti and advancing as far as the outskirts of Kutaisi.

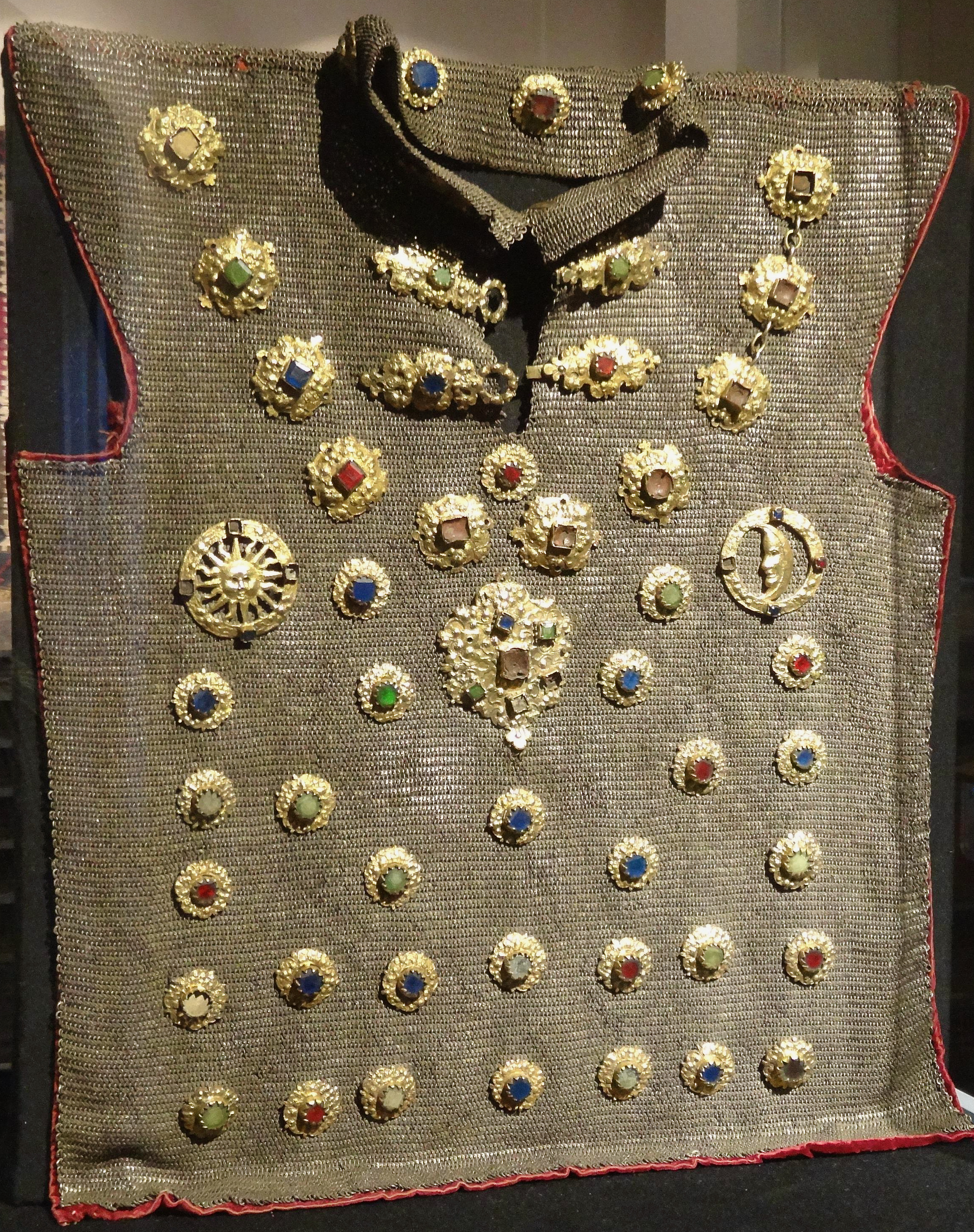
Mail shirt of Alexander III, King of Imereti.

It was during this succession of defeats that King George III died in the summer of 1639, leaving the throne to his son, Alexander III of Imereti. The new monarch continued to face Mingrelian raids, which repeatedly targeted villages surrounding Kutaisi—particularly during the religious festivals of Christmas (25 December 1639), the Baptism of Christ (19 January 1640), and Easter (8 April).

To defend his capital, Alexander III fortified Kutaisi, constructing a defensive wall around the city and relocating the remaining loyal noble families to the royal court to prevent further betrayal. Meanwhile, Levan Dadiani, viewing himself as the most powerful ruler in western Georgia, consolidated his authority by building twelve palaces in his capital and securing his position with Shah Safi of Persia, who began to finance Dadiani's military operations.

In the early 1640s, Prince Mamuka, brother of King Alexander III of Imereti, was appointed general of the Imeretian army. He inflicted several defeats on the Mingrelians and regained control over a number of villages.

In February 1646, Levan Dadiani prepared for what he hoped would be a decisive victory to end the war. After forcing a French gunsmith held captive in Zugdidi to manufacture thirty cannons, Dadiani laid siege to Kutaisi and demolished the defensive wall that had been constructed a few years earlier.

According to Vakhushti, King Alexander III watched from his palace as the Mingrelian soldiers devastated his capital and took hundreds of civilians hostage. Despite the king's fears for his younger brother, Mamuka managed to divert the Mingrelian forces, leading to a counterattack that resulted in a Mingrelian defeat, although Mamuka himself was captured and taken prisoner to Zugdidi.

In 1648, following a two-year economic blockade, Alexander III was forced to send his ally Teimuraz I of Kakheti to negotiate with Levan Dadiani in Zugdidi. The negotiations failed, and the Imeretian king ultimately sent his son, Bagrat, as a hostage to the Mingrelian prince.

=== Foreign Involvement ===
The conflict in Western Georgia remained primarily an internal civil war, involving the forces of Guria, Mingrelia, and Imereti, and occasionally a few battalions from the Georgian kingdom of Kartli supporting the rebellious princes. However, the war unfolded in a broader context of strategic division among the Georgian states, influenced by the neighboring Muslim empires and the early stages of Russian expansion into the Caucasus.

At the beginning of the war, Levan II Dadiani of Mingrelia took advantage of the Ottoman Empire’s strategic interests, as Istanbul benefited from the weakening of the central government in Kutaisi. Sultan Murad IV dispatched a light cavalry unit to assist Mingrelia, but simultaneously increased the tribute demanded from Zugdidi, creating an unstable alliance. In 1634, the Ottomans carried out military raids in the Kodori Valley, part of Mingrelian territory.

The situation changed in 1633 with the accession of Rostom Khan, a Georgian prince educated at the Safavid court of Shah Abbas I, to the throne of Kartli, the central Georgian kingdom. This occurred amid the Ottoman–Safavid War (1623–1639).

Levan Dadiani quickly allied himself with the pro-Safavid Kingdom of Kartli by marrying his sister Mariam Dadiani to King Rostom in 1633. The marriage was soon approved by the Safavid court in Isfahan, which sought to use the alliance to unify the Georgian kingdoms under Persian suzerainty. Consequently, the Persians began to finance Mingrelian military campaigns against the King of Imereti, though this policy was abandoned following the signing of the Treaty of Zuhab in 1639, which ended hostilities between the Ottoman and Safavid Empires.

Around 1636, the Mingrelians sent an embassy to Russia, led by the priest Gabriel Geguenava, to seek the support of Tsar Michael I. However, the delegation was detained for two years by Russian authorities in the Caucasus and only returned in December 1639, accompanied by Russian envoys Fedot Elchin and Pavel Zakhariev. Russia then demanded formal submission from the Mingrelian ruler, which Levan II Dadiani accepted after considerable hesitation.

=== Fall of Levan II Dadiani ===
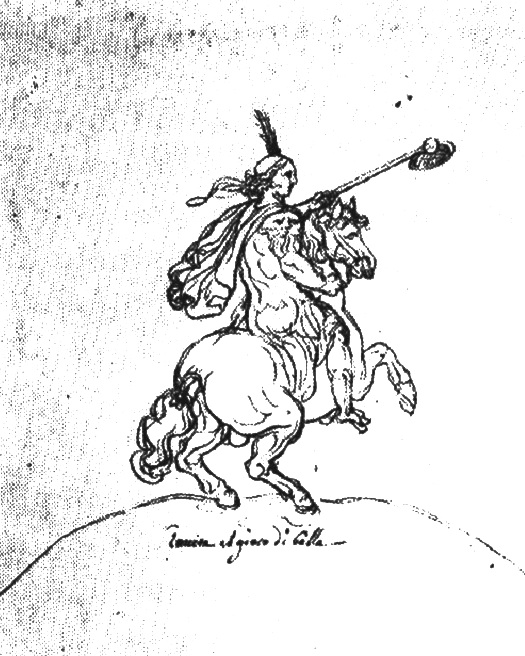
Prince Mamuka of Imereti, whose death as a hostage of Levan II Dadiani led to the end of the alliance between Mingrelia and Rostom of Kartli.

Following the siege of Kutaisi in 1646, Mingrelia’s military ambitions became increasingly excessive. The alliance between the Persians and Dadiani collapsed after the end of the Ottoman–Persian hostilities, while the Ottomans offered little support to the Christian prince. Mingrelia’s submission to Moscow weakened when Alexander III sent a joint embassy with Teimuraz, the former king of Kakheti exiled in Imereti, to present their allegiance to the Russian Empire, writing to Tsar Alexis I: “From this day forward, I am your servant. I am the servant of your kingdom, as are my nobles, my people, and my lands.”

In 1651, Levan Dadiani launched another offensive against the Imeretians, once again besieging Kutaisi and devastating the Gelati Monastery, the seat of the Catholicosate of Western Georgia and the burial place of the kings of Imereti. During this raid, the Mingrelians captured around forty nobles from the exiled court of Teimuraz of Kakheti and several of the most valiant musketeers from Alexander III’s army. They celebrated their victory by blinding Prince Mamuka, Alexander III’s brother—who had been held hostage in Zugdidi since 1646—and the adopted son of King Rostom of Kartli. This act, which led to the death of the Imeretian prince, forced Rostom to renounce his alliance with Mingrelia.

In October 1651, Alexander III signed a formal agreement with Russian envoys, completely isolating Levan Dadiani. Levan II of Mingrelia died on 17 March 1657, after a reign of forty-six years. His death did not bring an immediate end to the long civil war but quickly altered the strategic balance in the region.

=== Restoration of Royal authority ===
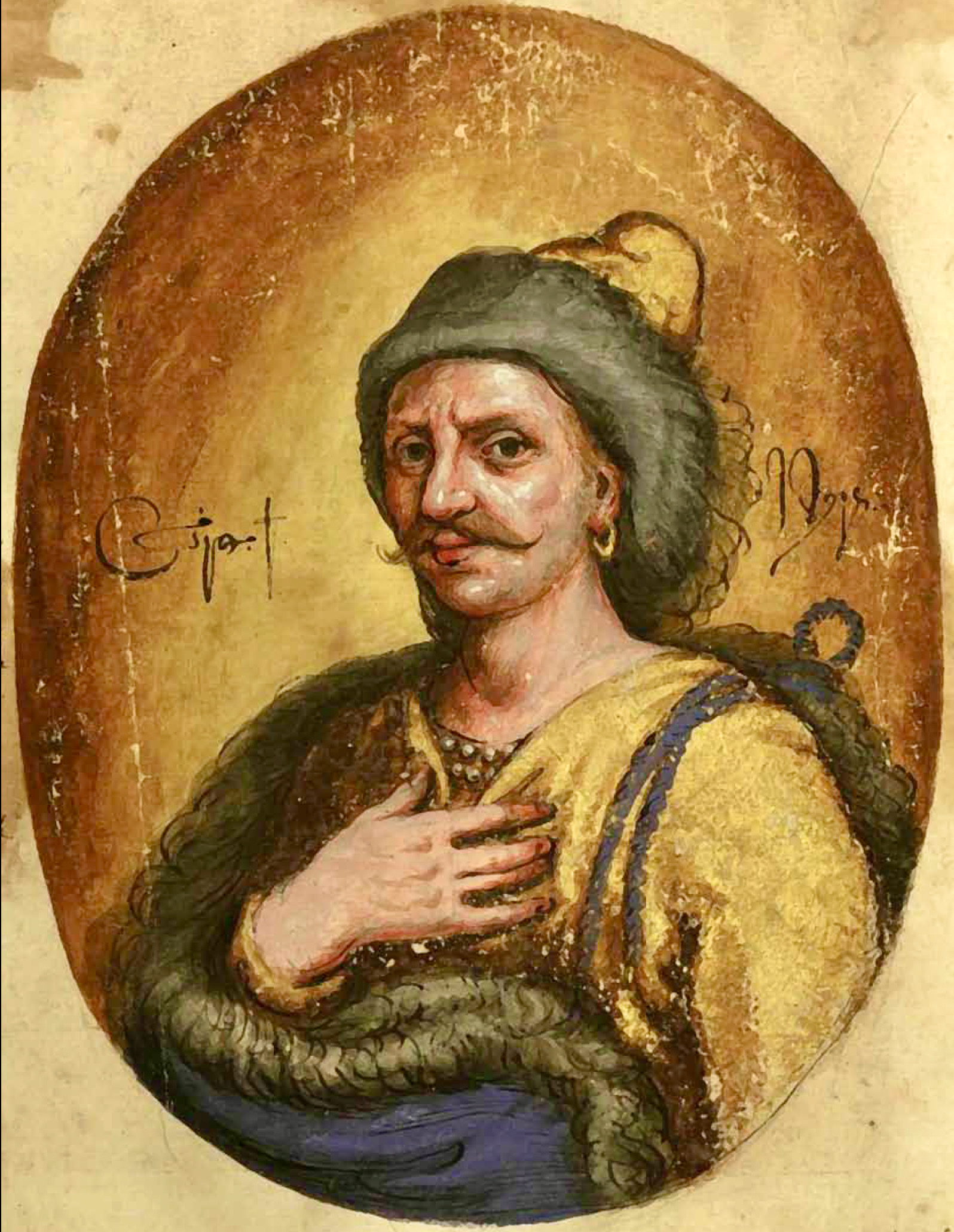
Vameq III Dadiani.

The death of Levan II quickly destabilized the internal politics of Mingrelia. The inhabitants of Zugdidi, no longer restrained by the prince’s authoritarian rule, threatened to revolt in protest against the nobles’ accumulation of wealth, and the succession to the throne soon became contested. Liparit Dadiani, Levan’s nephew, was crowned as Liparit III, but his rule was opposed by Vameq Lipartiani, lord of Salipartiano, who sought to take advantage of the ongoing military conflict to seize power.

Lipartiani formed an alliance with King Alexander III of Imereti, promising to restore the kingdom’s natural frontier along the Tskhenistskali River. Meanwhile, Liparit III appealed for aid from other Georgian monarchs and from the Ottoman Empire, but the Pashalik of Childir sent him few troops. The forces dispatched by Rostom of Kartli were forced to turn back after a strategic dispute among generals that the king could not resolve. Only Kaikhosro I Gurieli and the noble Chiladze and Mikeladze families responded to Liparit’s call for help, and the opposing armies met near the village of Bandza in Mingrelia.

In June 1658, the decisive Battle of Bandza ended with a final victory for the central government of the Kingdom of Imereti. Liparit III was killed in the fighting, and Alexander III crowned Vameq as Prince of Mingrelia after Teimuraz refused the title. The victory restored Imereti’s former frontiers and Mingrelia’s vassal status, while Alexander confiscated much of Zugdidi’s treasury and freed the Imeretian captives.

Kaikhosro of Guria was deposed and fled to Istanbul, seeking refuge at the Ottoman court. Another prince of the house of Gurieli, Demetrius, was installed by Alexander III as vassal ruler of Guria. The Kingdom of Imereti thereby reasserted its dominance over western Georgia, bringing to an end the thirty-five-year civil war.

== Aftermath ==
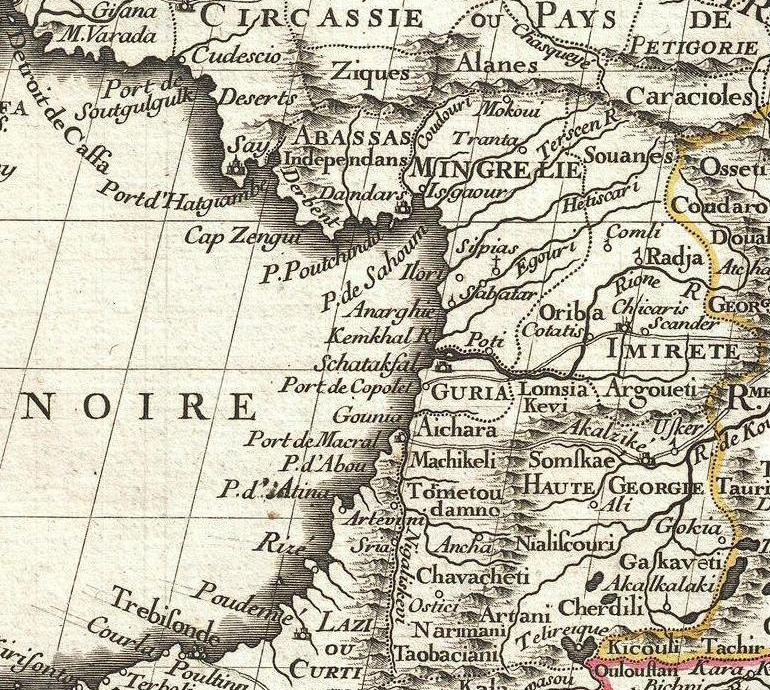
A portion of the 1724 French map, focused on western Georgia.

Despite the reunification of western Georgia under the rule of the Kingdom of Imereti, the end of hostilities proved temporary. In March 1660, two years after the Battle of Bandza, King Alexander III died, leaving only a young illegitimate son, Bagrat IV, as his successor. He was soon overthrown by a faction of nobles, and Imereti once again descended into chaos, witnessing the succession of seven monarchs over the following decade, including Demetrius Gurieli and Vameq Lipartiani, both princes previously crowned by Alexander III.

Three decades of war had seriously weakened royal authority, enabling the neighboring Kingdom of Kartli to seize control of Kutaisi as early as 1661. Mingrelia and Guria never again returned under central Imeretian rule after the 1660s, while the Ottoman Empire took advantage of Georgia’s division to expand the Childir Eyalet. Georgian nobles in Abkhazia gradually isolated themselves, and despite their nominal allegiance to the crown, they were left to defend their territories against mountain tribes and Ottoman pirates without support from Imereti. The abandonment of Abkhazia by Levan Dadiani opened the way for Circassians to settle in the region, progressively replacing Georgian authority.

The contemporary traveler Jean Chardin, who visited Mingrelia several times, reported that the region’s population fell from 40,000 to 20,000 by the end of the war, due to the extensive slave trade and the area’s severe economic devastation. According to historian Nodar Assatiani, this period was particularly harsh for western Georgia:

"The population was exploited by the invaders. In this part of Georgia, the natural conditions were less favorable for agriculture than in eastern Georgia, and the decline in production led to disastrous results. The feudal economy drifted into decay. Towns were pillaged, and the economy collapsed.”

The war of 1623–1658 was merely a symptom of the deep division among the Georgian states since the end of the Middle Ages. Its beginning did not mark the start of Imereti’s decline—a kingdom already weakened—but its conclusion only prepared the realm for a darker chapter in its history.

== Bibliography ==
- Asatiani, Nodar; Bendianashvili, Alexandre (1997). Histoire de la Géorgie. Paris: L'Harmattan. ISBN 2-7384-6186-7.
- Asatiani, Nodar (2008). Საქართველოს ისტორია II [History of Georgia, Volume 2] (in Georgian). Tbilisi: Tbilisi University Press. ISBN 978-9941-13-004-5.
- Khakhutaishvili, Davit (2009). "ნარკვევები გურიის სამთავროს ისტორიიდან (XV-XVIII სს.)" [Studies in the history of the Principality of Guria (15th–18th centuries)]. სამტომეული, ტ. 2 [Works in three volumes, Vol. 2] (in Georgian). Batumi: Shota Rustaveli State University. pp. 45–46. ISBN 978-9941-409-60-8.
- Rayfield, Donald (2012). Edge of Empires, a History of Georgia. London: Reaktion Books. ISBN 978-1-78023-070-2.
- Salia, Kalistrat (1980). Histoire de la nation géorgienne [History of the Georgian nation] (in French). Paris: Nino Salia.
- Suny, Ronald Grigor (1994). The making of the Georgian nation (2. ed.). Bloomington: Indiana Univ. Press. ISBN 0253209153.
