= Mariam Dadiani =

Mariam Dadiani may refer to:

- Queens of Kartli
  - Mariam Dadiani (1599/1609–1682), daughter of Manuchar I Dadiani, Prince of Mingrelia and wife of Simon II Gurieli, Prince of Guria, in 1621, King Rostom of Kartli in 1634, and the latter's adopted son and successor, King Vakhtang V of Kartli in 1659
- Queens of Imereti
  - Mariam Dadiani (died before December 1732), daughter of Bezhan Dadiani, Prince of Mingrelia and wife of Alexander V of Imereti
  - Mariam Dadiani (died 1780), daughter of Otia Dadiani, Prince of Mingrelia and wife of Solomon I of Imereti
  - Mariam Dadiani (died 1841), daughter of Katsia II Dadiani, Prince of Mingrelia and wife of Solomon II of Imereti

== See also ==
- Mariam of Georgia (disambiguation)
