= Tamar Gurieli (daughter of Mamia II Gurieli) =

Georgian noblewoman

Tamar Gurieli (Georgian: თამარ გურიელი) was a Georgian noblewoman of the House of Gurieli. She was the daughter of Mamia II Gurieli, Prince of Guria, and the first wife of Alexander III of Imereti.

== Biography ==
Tamar was the daughter of Mamia II Gurieli, Prince of Guria, and his wife, Tinatin Jaqeli. The Theatine monk Giuseppe Maria Zampi described her as a woman of "rare beauty."

In 1618, Tamar married Prince Alexander (the future Alexander III of Imereti), the son of King George III of Imereti. The couple had one son, Bagrat. In 1620, after two years of marriage, Alexander accused Tamar of adultery with a merchant from Kutaisi and divorced her. He then sent Tamar and their infant son back to Guria to her father.

Humiliated by his daughter's treatment, Mamia II Gurieli turned against the Kingdom of Imereti and allied himself with Levan II Dadiani, who saw the dispute between Guria and Imereti as an opportunity to form an anti-Imeretian coalition. Taking advantage of the rift between Guria and Imereti, Levan strengthened the alliance by marrying his sister, Mariam, to Mamia's son Simon.

The divorce of Tamar and Alexander contributed to the formation of two rival political blocs in western Georgia. On one side stood the Kingdom of Imereti; on the other were Mingrelia, Guria, and Abkhazia. The growing hostility between these factions ultimately developed into the Georgian Civil War of 1623–1658. Following his parents' divorce, their son Bagrat was raised in Guria and was recognized by Alexander III as heir to the throne only shortly before his death.

== Bibliography ==
- Rekhviashvili, Mikheil (1989). K. Chkhataraishvili (ed.). იმერეთის სამეფო (1462–1810 წ.წ.) [The Kingdom of Imereti (1462–1810)] (in Georgian). Tbilisi: Tbilisi University Press.
- Brosset, Marie-Félicité (1856). Histoire de la Georgie depuis l'antiquite jusqu'au 19. siecle (in French). Vol. 5. l'acad. Imper. des sciences.
- Rayfield, Donald (2012). Edge of Empires: A History of Georgia. London: Reaktion Books. ISBN 978-1-78023-070-2.
- Toumanoff, Cyril (1976). Manuel de Généalogie et de Chronologie pour l'histoire de la Caucasie chrétienne (Arménie, Géorgie, Albanie) [Manual of Genealogy and Chronology of Christian Caucasian History (Armenia, Georgia, Albania)] (in French). Rome: Edizioni Aquila.
