= Prince Mamuka of Imereti =

Prince Mamuka
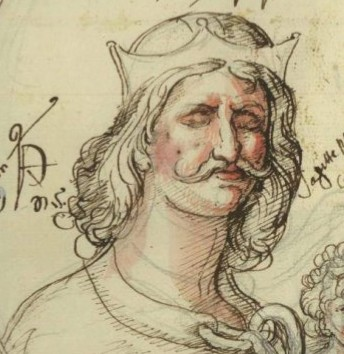
- Prince Mamuka by Teramo Castelli.
- Born: Kingdom of Imereti
- Died: 1654; Principality of Mingrelia
- Spouse: Daughter of Bezhan Chkheidze
- Issue: Prince Archil
- Dynasty: Bagrationi
- Father: George III of Imereti
- Mother: Tamar
- Religion: Georgian Orthodox Church (Catholicate of Abkhazia)

Mamuka (Georgian: მამუკა; died 1654) was a member of the Bagrationi dynasty of Imereti, a kingdom in western Georgia. A son of King George III of Imereti, he was a leading commander in the Georgian civil war of 1623–1658 against Levan II Dadiani, Prince of Mingrelia, who captured Mamuka in 1647 and had him blinded. Mamuka died as Dadiani's prisoner. At one point in the 1630s, Mamuka had been considered by the childless king Rostom of Kartli as his heir apparent.

== Early life and family ==
Mamuka was a son of King George III of Imereti (r. 1605–1639) by his wife Tamar, and a younger brother of George's successor, Alexander III (r. 1639–1660). Both these kings were perpetually harassed by their expansionist neighbor, Levan II Dadiani, Prince of Mingrelia. An able soldier praised by the Georgian chroniclers for his bravery, Mamuka played a prominent role in the war with Dadiani. Levan attempted to win over Mamuka by marrying the prince with his daughter; instead, Mamuka married an Imeretian princess from the Chkheidze family. He had a son, Archil (fl. 1675–1683), whose son, Mamuka (fl. 1685–1687), was the last known descendant of this family.

== Heir apparent of Kartli ==
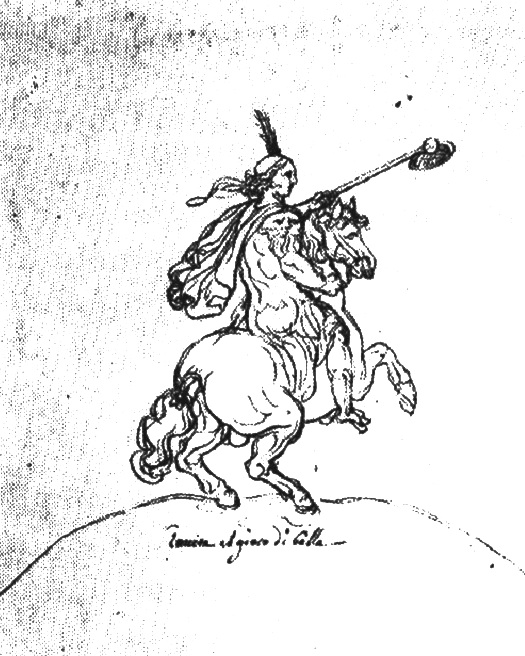
Prince Mamuka of Imereti playing polo. A drawing from the travel album of Cristoforo Castelli, living in Georgia from 1627 to 1654.

In 1634, George III fell into the Mingrelian hands and Alexander had to pay a ransom. Prince Mamuka and his father-in-law Bezhan Chkheidze took refuge with Yusuf I, an Ottoman pasha of the Childir Eyalet, and lived there, at times raiding Imereti and Guria, until being summoned by Rostom, the childless king of Kartli, to become his adopted son and heir apparent. However, a group of nobles of Kartli, who had persuaded Rostom to adopt Mamuka by virtue of his bravery, royal descent, and dynastic kinship, then conspired with Chkheidze to murder Rostom and make Mamuka king of Kartli. The plot collapsed when an assassin mistook a royal bath servant for the king and had to flee, leaving the servant wounded. Rostom refrained from publicizing the incident and, through a private letter, patiently forced Mamuka back to his exile in Akhaltsikhe. Chkheidze and his numbers remained in Kartli to continue their struggle with Rostom.

== Last years and death ==
By 1647, Mamuka was again in Imereti, leading resistance to Levan II Dadiani's renewed offensive. Riding his favorite buckskin horse, he spread terror among the Mingrelians. In one of Dadiani's attack on Imereti, Alexander III, Mamuka's reigning brother, hid the prince's buckskin horse to prevent him from going to battle, either out of fear of losing the brother or, as rumored, out of envy of his military prowess. Mamuka still hurried to charge the Mingrelians, putting them into flight. His horse stumbled when Mamuka speared down a fleeing enemy horseman and the prince fell off on the ground, being captured and brought in chains to Dadiani. Teimuraz I, the Kakhetian king-in-exile, who was related by kinship to both the king of Imereti and the prince Dadiani, attempted to negotiate Mamuka's release, but Levan refused. During yet another outbreak of hostilities with Imereti, Dadiani had Mamuka blinded in prison. Alexander III complained to Rostom and the latter, with the consent of his wife Mariam, sister of Levan Dadiani, solemnly cursed the prince of Mingrelia. Mamuka remained in captivity and in 1654 died, being mourned in Imereti and Kartli.
