= Tamar Gurieli =

Tamar Gurieli may refer to:

- Tamar Gurieli, Georgian noblewoman, daughter of Mamia II Gurieli
- Tamar Gurieli (died 1742), Georgian princess
