= Battle of Bandza =

17th-century Georgian military conflict

The Battle of Bandza (Georgian: ბანძის ბრძოლა) was fought in 1658 between Alexander III of Imereti, and the rulers of Guria and Mingrelia.

In 1657, Alexander III invaded Mingrelia and replaced its ruler, Liparit III Dadiani, with Vameq III Dadiani. Liparit sought refuge with his half-brother, Kaikhosro I Gurieli, and began preparations to regain his throne. They received military support from Rostom, Pasha of Childir, and Rostom, King of Kartli, while the nobles Mikheiladze and Chiladze also joined their forces. The battle took place near Bandza in July 1658 and ended in victory for the forces of Alexander III and Vameq III Dadiani. Liparit III and Kaikhosro I fled to the Ottoman Empire, while a large part of their army was captured.
