= Mamia II Gurieli =

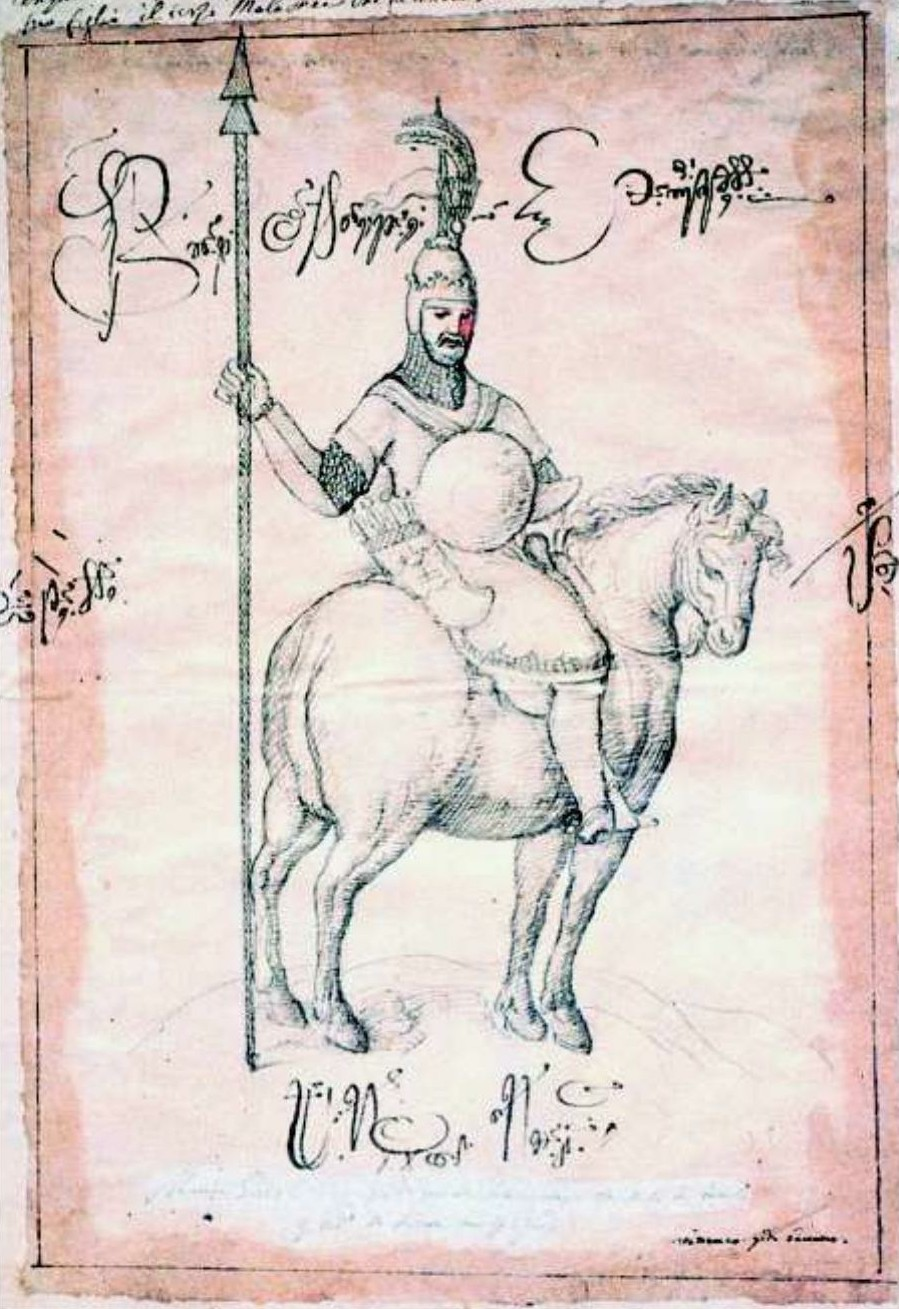
- Mamia II Gurieli's portrait drawn by Teramo Castelli

Prince of Guria
- Reign: 1600–1625
- Predecessor: George II Gurieli
- Successor: Simon II Gurieli
- Born: c. 1572/1574
- Died: 1625
- Spouse: Tinatin Jaqeli
- Issue Among others: Simon II Gurieli; Tamar
- House: Gurieli
- Father: George II Gurieli
- Mother: Elene
- Religion: Georgian Orthodox Church (Catholicate of Abkhazia)

Mamia II Gurieli (Georgian: მამია II გურიელი; born between 1572 and 1574; died 1625) was a 17th-century Georgian prince that ruled over the Principality of Guria in Western Georgia. Son of George II Gurieli, he succeeded his father in 1600 after spending a decade as head of Gurian troops. As Prince, he distinguished himself as a staunch supporter of closer relations with other Georgian states and an enemy of the Ottoman Empire. However, his policy failed as he was forced to remain under Turkish influence, while his ties with the Kingdom of Imereti progressively declined until an armed conflict and his assassination in 1625.

== Biography ==
=== Youth ===
Mamia was the eldest son of George II Gurieli, Prince of Guria, whose reign is largely unstable and characterized by conflicts between the various Georgian states, which forced George II into exile in Istanbul in 1583, though Mamia's fate during that time is unknown.

Following his father's return to the throne of Guria in 1587, Mamia was granted several responsibilities. In 1589, he led Gurian troops in the war his father launched against the Kingdom of Imereti and managed, with Ottoman help, to depose King Rostom, who was at the time acting as a puppet king of the Principality of Mingrelia. Mamia crowned the young prince Bagrat IV as King of Imereti and stayed in the royal capital Kutaisi under his father's orders to protect the unstable throne. Starting in 1590, he had to defend the kingdom against the armies of King Simon I of Kartli, the ruler of Central Georgia, who deposed Bagrat IV and expelled the Gurian troops.

When Abkhaz pirates under the leadership of Prince Putu launched maritime raids on the Black Sea shores of Guria in 1591, Mamia led the defense of the coast and expelled them.

George II died in 1600 (or 1598 in some sources) and Mamia succeeded him as Mamia II Gurieli, a prince enjoying de facto independence but formally under the protection of the Kingdom of Imereti.

=== Ottoman War ===
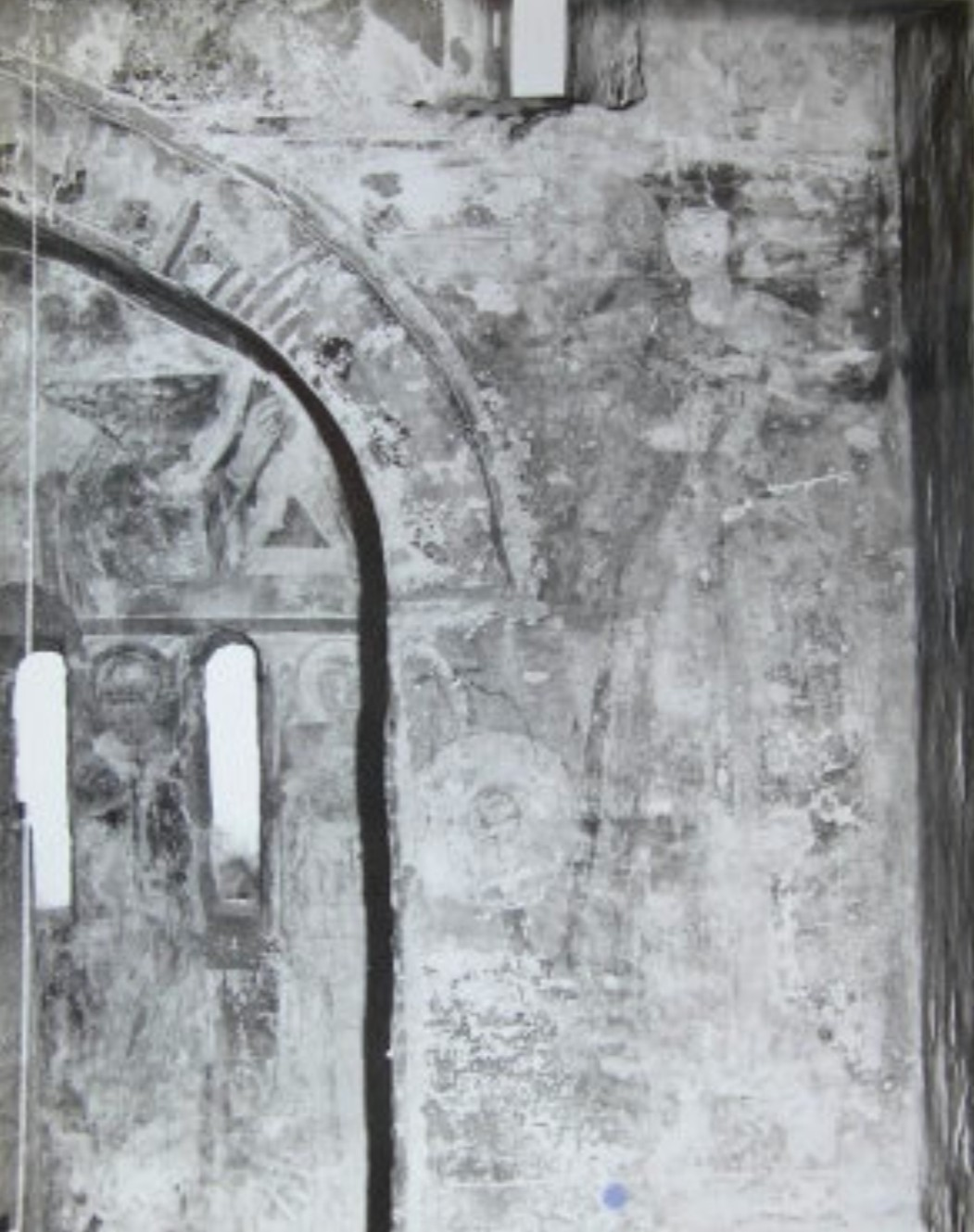
Mamia II Gurieli, fresco from Shemokmedi Monastery.

As soon as he acceded the Gurian throne, Mamia II changed his father's pro-Ottoman and anti-Imeretian foreign policy. 18th-century historian Vakhusht Bagrationi would later describe Mamia II's accession as the beginning of a time of peace between Guria, Imereti, and Mingrelia. His oldest daughter Ana's wedding to King Teimuraz I in 1606 (or 1607–1608 based on other sources) shows that Mamia sought to find allies even the easternmost Georgian states.

In a complete reversal of his predecessors' policies, Mamia II forged an alliance with Safavid Persia in 1609 by using his ties to pro-Safavid Kakheti. Using the Ottoman–Safavid War of 1603–1612 to his advantage, he sent a joint Mingrelian-Gurian army to invade Adjara, a former Gurian region annexed by the Ottoman Empire 50 years prior, and slaughtered the Turkish troops stationed in Batumi in 1609. However, with Persia holding little to no imperial ambitions in Western Georgia and Persian troops never reaching Guria, Mamia II was forced to engage with North Caucasian Cossacks to protect his territorial gains. The Cossacks crossed the Dnepr and launched raids on Black Sea Ottoman ports.

Istanbul responded by imposing a maritime blockade on Guria and Mingrelia, removing their access to salt and iron imports. In 1614, Mamia II and Levan II Dadiani petitioned Sultan Ahmed I, asking him to seek a peaceful solution to the conflict and on 13 December, Mamia II met Ambassador Omar Pasha and Italian emissary Ludovico Grangiero to negotiate. They agreed to an end of the blockade in exchange for the return of Adjara to the Ottoman Empire, an annual tribute of six grams of silver per household, and male and female slaves. On his side, Mamia won the right to refuse entry to all Ottoman troops. Mingrelia, Abkhazia, and Imereti reached a similar agreement a few months later.

Mamia II had to face the Cossacks he invited into his lands. They had been attacking Black Sea ports in Guria and in 1616, launched large raids against Gurian, Mingrelian and Ottoman towns.

=== Alliance and Collapse ===
The return of stability in Western Georgia allowed Mamia II to stay in peace with Mingrelia and Imereti. Together, he wrote a letter to Tsar Michael I of Russia, asking him to grant asylum to exiled king Teimuraz I of Kakheti, a request refused by Moscow. Western unity was solidified again in 1618 with the marriage of Prince Alexander, heir to the throne of Imereti, to Princess Tamar Gurieli, daughter of Mamia II.

That alliance was short-lived. In 1620, Kutaisi expelled Princess Tamar, accusing her of adultery and forcing her to find refuge in Guria with her son Bagrat. Guria and Mingrelia responded by imposing a blockade on Imereti and organizing their own marriage alliance: Simon Gurieli, son and heir of Mamia II, married Levan II Dadiani's sister, Mariam, while Prince Levan II married the daughter of the Prince of Abkhazia. In anticipation of an attack by Imereti, Mingrelia and Guria launched their own attack against King George III in December 1623.

The Western Georgian civil war was started between the different western Georgian states, a conflict that would last until 1658 and that would considerably weaken the region for centuries to come. Levan Dadiani became de facto lord of all the Black Sea Georgian states and exiled his vizier Paata Tsulukidze after accusing him of treason. Tsulukidze found refuge at the court of Mamia II.

=== Murder ===
Mamia II entertained a difficult relationship with his children. His daughter Ana, queen of Kakheti, died in 1610. His son Manuchar died in 1612. Mamia had a chapel built for the latter at Chekheda in the vicinity of Kobuleti, as a metochion to the Greek Orthodox Patriarchate of Jerusalem.

In 1625 (or, according to a 17th-century annotation in a liturgical anthology of the Monastery of Shemokmedi, in 1627), while in open war with Imereti, he was murdered in his sleep by his oldest son Simon. The latter became Prince of Guria and made a donation to the Monastery of Achi to ask the Catholicate of Abkhazia to forgive his sins. Levan II of Mingrelia, opposed to the change in power, invaded the principality, deposed Simon, and became the formal suzerain of House Gurieli.

== Family ==
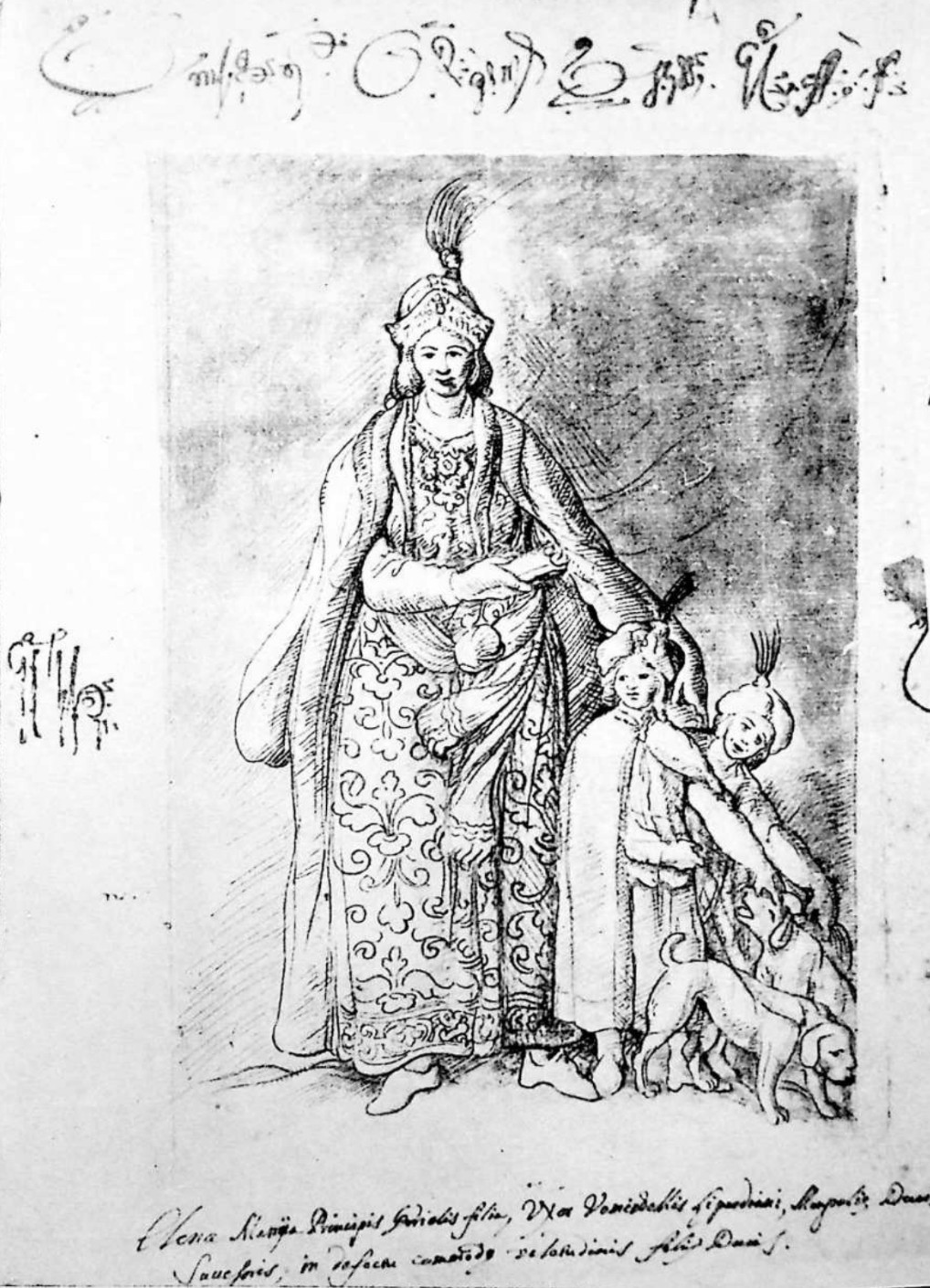
Elene, daughter of Mamia II Gurieli.

Mamia II GurielI was married to Tinatin, daughter of Qvarqvare IV Jaqeli. They had at least six children, including one prince and two queens:

- Manuchar (died 1612);
- Simon II Gurieli (1606–c. 1672), patricide and next prince of Guria;
- Ana (died 1610), who married Teimuraz I;
- Tamar, who married Alexander III of Imereti;
- Tinatin (died 1627), who married Kaikhosro, Prince of Mukhrani;
- Elene, who married Vameq III Dadiani.

== Bibliography ==
- Rayfield, Donald (2012). Edge of Empires – A History of Georgia. London: Reaktion Books Ltd.
- Battaglini, Marco (1699). Annali del sacedrozio e dell imperio [Annals of the priesthood and the empire] (in Italian). Venice.
- Khakhutaishvili, Davit (2009). კვლევები გურიის სამთავროს ისტორიის შესახებ (XV-XVIII სს.) [Studies on the history of the Principality of Guria (15th–18th centuries)] (in Georgian). Batumi: Shota Rustaveli State University.
