= Nikoloz Cholokashvili =

Georgian priest and politician

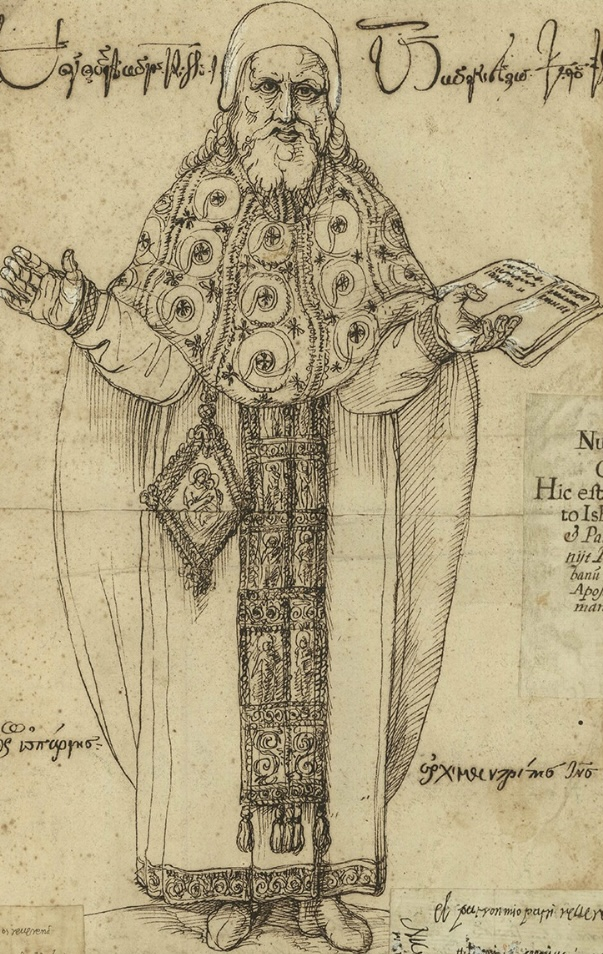
Niceforo Irbachi, a portrait from the travel album of Cristoforo Castelli.

Nikoloz Cholokashvili (Nicholas Irubakidze-Cholokashvili) (Georgian: ნიკოლოზ ჩოლოყაშვილი; ნიკოლოზ ირუბაქიძე-ჩოლოყაშვილი), known in Europe as Niceforo Irbachi, (1585–1658), was a Georgian Orthodox priest, politician and diplomat.

== Life ==
Born into a prominent aristocratic family, he was educated at a Greek clerical school in Italy. From 1608 to 1614, he served later a priest at the court of Teimuraz I, king of Kakheti, eastern Georgia. During the invasion by Shah Abbas I in 1614, he left for Jerusalem. In 1625, Teimuraz assigned him to lead an embassy to Europe in order to get support against the Persian aggression. The mission, however, went in vain; the Europeans at that time were too involved in the Thirty Years' War to be concerned about the fate of a small Christian kingdom in the Caucasus. While visiting Rome, he helped to publish a Georgian dictionary, the first printed book in Georgian, in 1629. Upon returning in Georgia, he was ordained as a senior priest at Metekhi Church, Tbilisi, 1629-1632. In 1632, he was invited by the Mingrelian prince Levan II Dadiani, and appointed him as a minister. From 1643 to 1649, he lived again in Jerusalem, where he served as an archimandrite of the Georgian Monastery of the Cross. He returned to Mingrelia in 1649, and was consecrated as Catholicos of Abkhazia (western Georgia) in 1650. After the death of Levan II (1657), Nicholas was arrested by the new prince Vameq III Dadiani, and died in imprisonment in 1658.

== See also ==
- Cholokashvili, Georgian surname
