= Mariam Dadiani (died 1682) =

Queen of Kartli (1634–1658, 1658–1675)

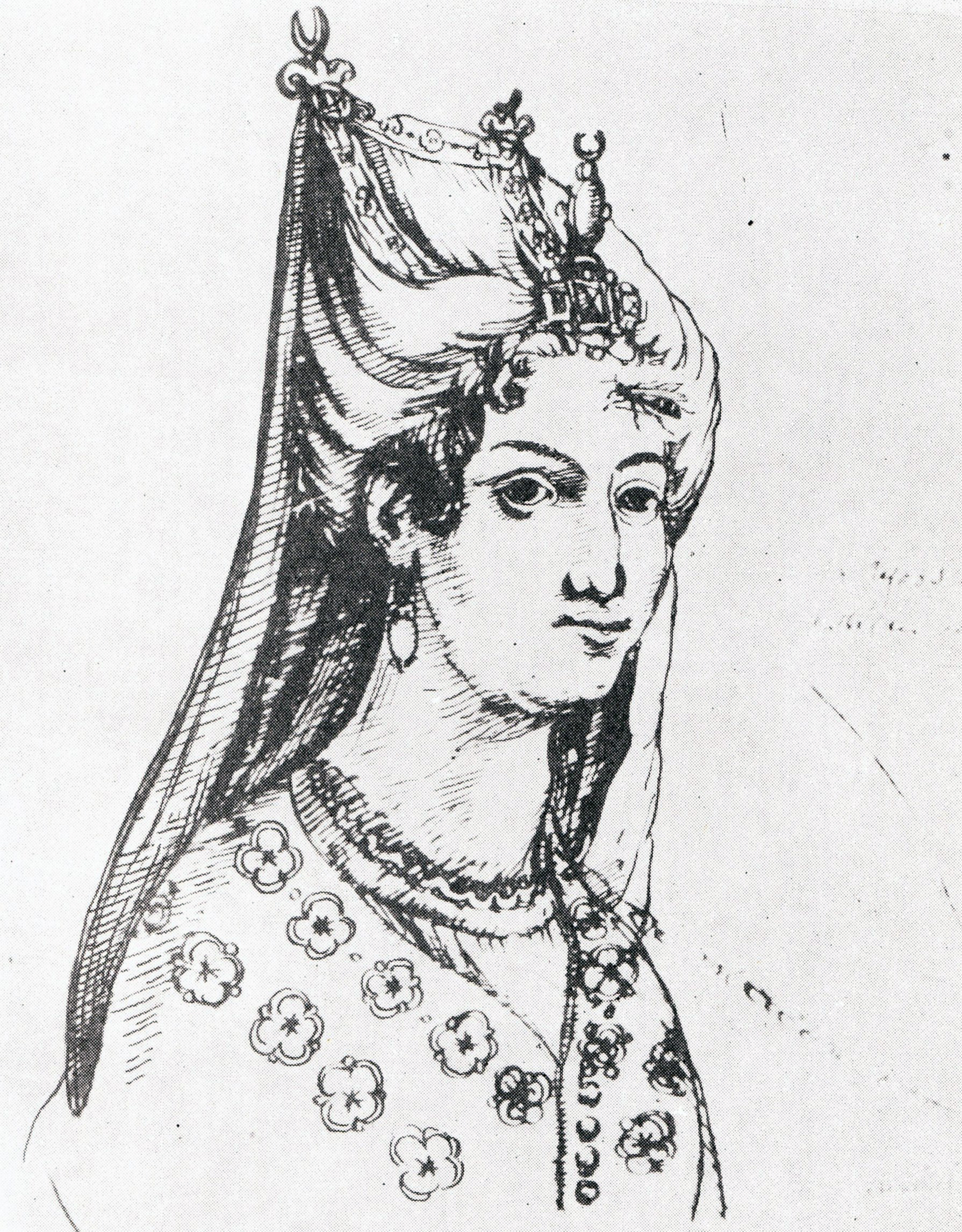
- A drawing of Dadiani from the album of Roman Catholic missionary Cristoforo Castelli, who lived in Georgia from 1627 to 1654.

Queen consort of Kartli
- Tenure: 1634–1658; 1659–1675
- Born: between 1599 and 1609
- Died: 1682
- Burial: Svetitskhoveli Cathedral
- Spouse: Simon II Gurieli (m. 1621; div. 1625) Rostom of Kartli (m. 1634; died 1658) Vakhtang V (m. 1659; died 1676)
- Issue: Otia Gurieli
- House: Dadiani
- Father: Manuchar I Dadiani
- Mother: Tamar Jaqeli
- Religion: Georgian Orthodox Church
- Khelrtva

Mariam Dadiani (Georgian: მარიამ დადიანი; born between 1599 and 1609; died 1682) was a daughter of Manuchar I Dadiani, Prince of Mingrelia, by his second wife, Tamar Jaqeli. Thrice married, successively to Simon II Gurieli, Prince of Guria, in 1621, King Rostom of Kartli in 1634, and the latter's adopted son and successor, King Vakhtang V in 1658.

Mariam's dynastic marriages were part of complex political relations in the successor states of the former Kingdom of Georgia. Her first marriage was disrupted by her half-brother Levan II Dadiani, Prince of Mingrelia, in response to Simon Gurieli's patricidal coup. The second marriage, that with Rostom of Kartli, turned Mariam into an important figure in the contemporaneous Georgian politics. The wedding entourage was a thousands-strong army, which had to fight their way to Kartli against the forces of the principal opponent of the union, King George III of Imereti, an ally of Rostom's major foe, King Teimuraz I of Kakheti,

Beyond being a factor of rapprochement between Mingrelia and Kartli, Mariam, a devout Christian, acted as a protector of Georgian Christianity in lieu of her Muslim and religiously tolerant husband and helped relax religious tension in the country. At her request, the couple's wedding ceremony was held in a Christian rite. The queen had several churches repaired and restored and the medieval Georgian chronicles copied and compiled.

Mariam's only child, born of her first marriage to Simon I Gurieli, died young. The childless Rostom, anxious to secure the dynastic survival of the Bagrationi family under the protection of the Safavid empire of Iran, adopted the prince of Mukhrani, also of Bagrationi descent, who succeeded on his death as Vakhtang V and married the queen dowager Mariam as her third husband. She outlived Vakhtang and died aged over 70. She was buried with royal honors at the Svetitskhoveli Cathedral at Mtskheta.

== Family background and first marriage ==
Simon II Gurieli, Mariam Dadiani's first husband, depicted by Teramo Castelli.

Mariam was a daughter of Manuchar I Dadiani, Prince of Mingrelia, by his second wife, Princess Tamar Jaqeli, daughter of Kaikhosro II Jaqeli, Atabeg of Samtskhe. Levan II Dadiani, Manuchar's successor as Prince of Mingrelia, to whose political calculations Mariam's subsequent fate was closely tied, was her half-brother, born of Manuchar's first marriage to Nestan-Darejan, daughter of Alexander II of Kakheti. In 1621, Levan II arranged Mariam's marriage with Simon Gurieli, son of Mamia II Gurieli, Prince of Guria. Simon murdered his own father and seized control of Guria in 1625, prompting Levan to intervene militarily. Defeated and captured at Lanchkhuti, Simon lost his throne, sight, and family; Levan had him blinded, installed a loyal regime in Guria, and took Mariam and her son with him to Mingrelia. Simon kept in touch with his ex-wife and died as a monk at Jerusalem in 1672.

== Second marriage ==
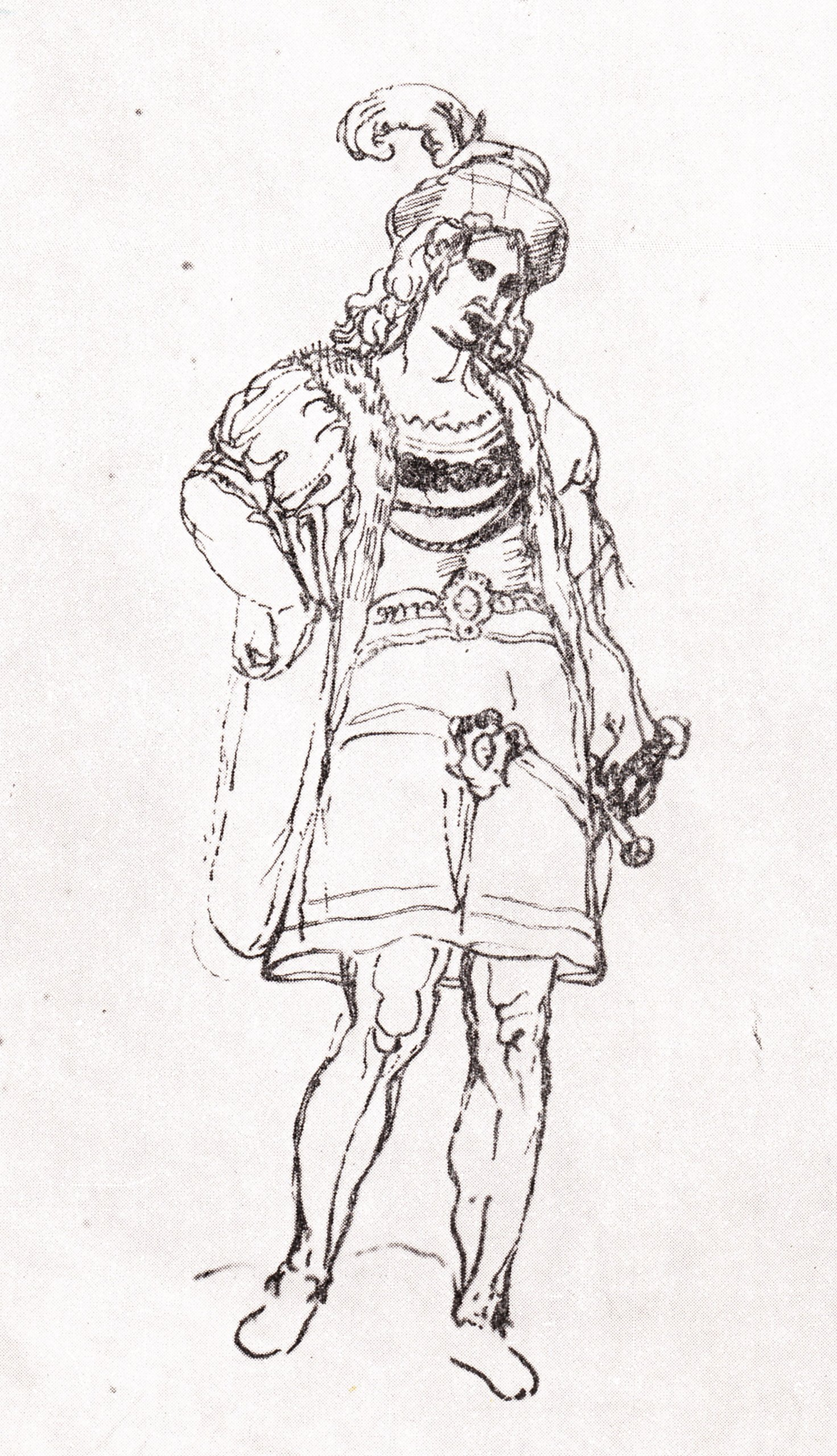
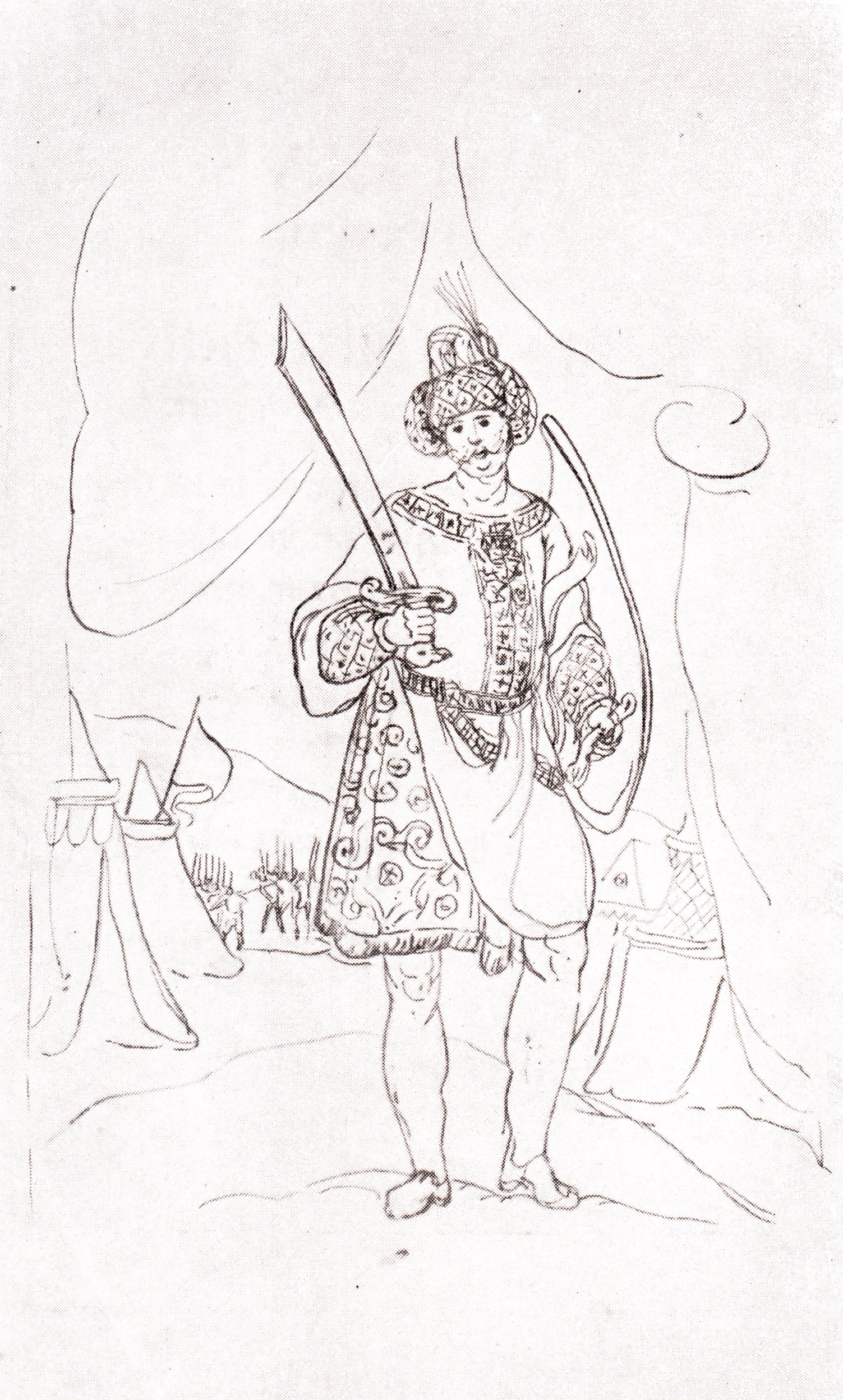
Simon Gurieli (left) and Rostom of Kartli (right), Mariam Dadiani's first and second husbands, as depicted in De Castelli's travel album.

A major turning point in Mariam's life came in 1634, when King Rostom of Kartli requested her hand in marriage. Rostom, a recent widower of around 70, was a Muslim Georgian, a natural son of the late king of Kartli, David XI. An influential courtier of the Safavid shahs of Iran, he had acceded to the throne of Kartli in 1633. His willingness to cooperate with his Safavid suzerains won for Kartli relative peace and a larger degree of autonomy. But Rostom's control of Kartli was challenged by his deposed predecessor Teimuraz I, of the Kakhetian Bagrationi, who had spent decades fighting against the Iranian hegemony. In his quest of political allies, Rostom sent the diplomat and churchman Nikoloz Cholokashvili as a marriage broker to the Dadiani court. The union also furthered Levan II's desire to have King George III of Imereti, an in-law and ally of Rostom's arch-rival Teimuraz, in check. As a faithful vassal, Rostom consulted Shah Safi about the decision. The shah approved this strategic marital arrangement as it suited the Safavid interest to extend their influence over Mingrelia and, ultimately, to conquer Imereti, which was considered as its spheres of influence by the Ottoman Empire, then at war with Iran. Shah Safi sent wedding presents, paid Dadiani 50,000 marchil (about 1.5 tones of silver) and granted him an annual salary of 1,000 tumans (gold coins of 3 grams).

The marriage preparations alarmed the Imeretians. The groom's party was a 30,000-strong army marching to meet Levan's heavily armed entourage. George III of Imereti blocked the border with Kartli, compelling Rostom's wedding suite to take a circuitous route via Akhaltsikhe, and intercepted Dadiani on his way to the marriage, but he was defeated and taken prisoner by Levan at the Kaka Bridge near Baghdati.

The wedding was lavishly celebrated at Rostom's capital of Tbilisi. Rostom, an Iranian-raised Muslim known for his religious tolerance and determined to keep Kartli at peace and consolidate his hold of the country under the Safavid patronage, acceded to the request of his Christian bride and the ceremony was held in Christian rites, with the nominal ritual baptism of the king prior to the wedding, as reported by the Italian eyewitness, Don Pietro Avitabile. He further stresses that Rostom frequently crossed himself in Mariam's presence and attended the liturgy.

== Patronage of culture ==
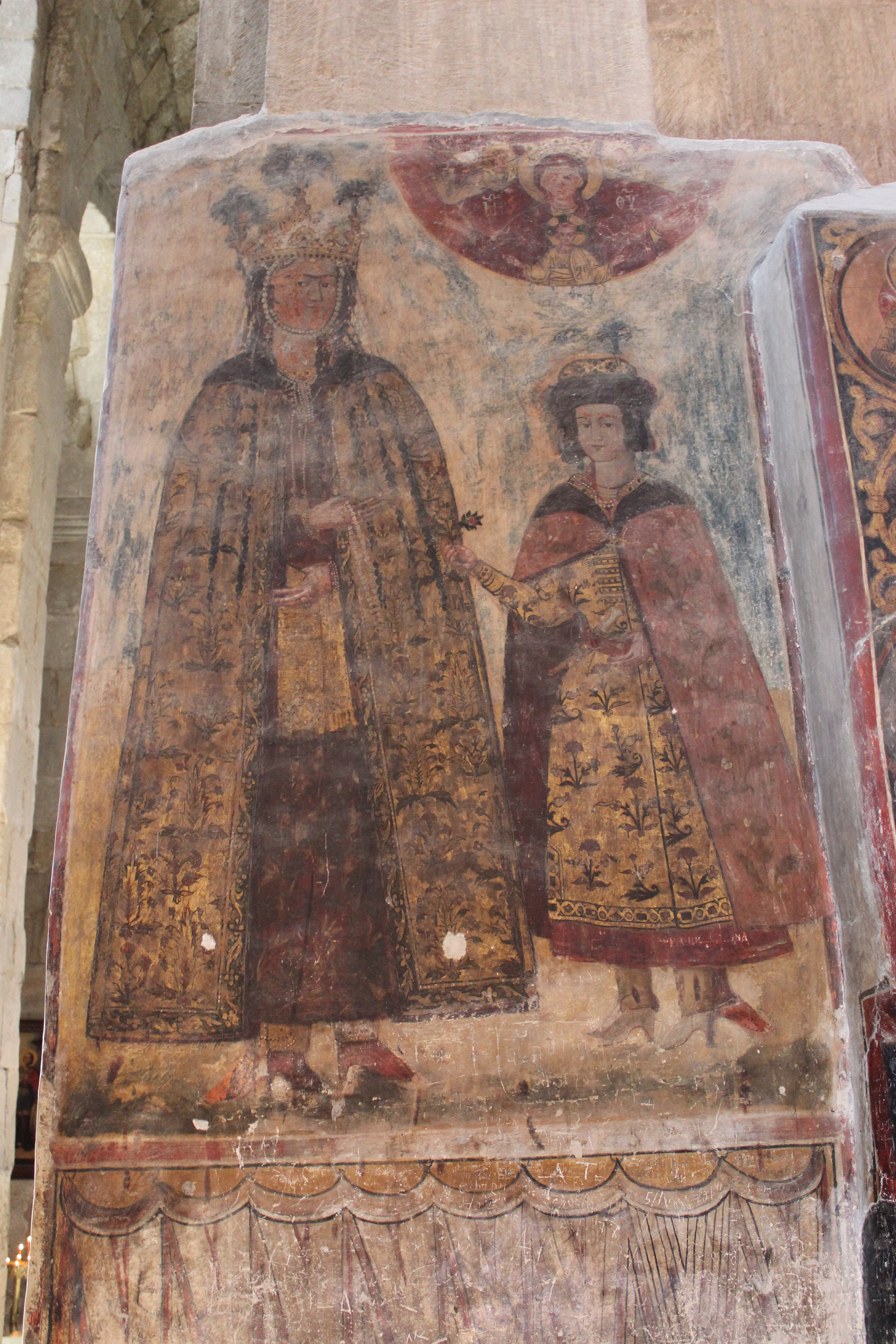
A 17th-century fresco from the Svetitskhoveli Cathedral in Mtskheta depicting Mariam and her son Otia.

The religious dichotomy of the court of Tbilisi added another, socio-cultural meaning to Rostom's political marriage to Mariam. Kartli, ruled by the Muslim king, whom his mostly Christian subjects accused of transplanting Iranian and Muslim customs into the country, acquired a patroness of the Christian church and culture. Acting with the consent and approval of Rostom, sometimes even independently of him, Mariam was able to reduce taxes levied on the church institutions and perishes, repair and refurnish the churches across eastern Georgia, including the Sioni church in Tbilisi, the patriarchal cathedral of the Living Pillar in Mtskheta, and the Alaverdi church in Kakheti. She was, however, unable to save her confessor, Catholicos Eudemus I, from Rostom's revenge; he was arrested and strangled in a prison cell in 1642 for having conspired with the exiled king Teimuraz to assassinate Rostom.

Mariam also had the medieval Georgian chronicles, the Life of Kartli, copied, collated, and edited sometime between 1638 and 1645. The manuscript, known the Mariamiseuli ("Queen Mariam Variant"), was found in 1885 and represented, until the discovery of the 15th-century Anaseuli ("Queen Ana Variant") in 1913, the earliest known Georgian text of the Life of Kartli.

== Issue of succession ==
Rostom had no children of either of his marriages. Anxious to secure the dynastic continuity in Kartli, he first adopted Mariam's son of her first marriage to Gurieli, Prince Otia, who was married to a daughter of Zaal, Duke of Aragvi. The prince died in 1645 or 1646 (according to the historian Cyril Toumanoff, "the date 1646, found on his tomb at the Mcxet'a Cathedral, must be taken to refer to its erection and not to the Prince's death."). Another candidacy was Prince Mamuka of Imereti, a son of the late king George III of Imereti and a brother of the reigning king Alexander III of Imereti, whom Mariam's half-brother Levan Dadiani fought relentlessly. Mamuka had found refuge in Kartli, but he was again in Imereti in 1647, when Levan captured him in battle and had his eyes gorged out. Alexander III complained to Rostom, who was outraged and, with the consent of Queen Mariam, solemnly cursed Levan Dadiani. The blinded prince Mamuka died in 1654.

Around 1639, Rostom's choice then fell on a son of his first cousin, the Iranian-raised Prince Luarsab, who was killed while on a hunt in 1652. Rostom then tried to entice Luarsab's brother, Vakhtang, to become his heir, but the king's envoy found him already dead of illness in Iran. The envoy, Prince Bakhuta, of the collateral Bagrationi branch of Mukhrani, was eventually adopted by Rostom as his son and heir in 1653.

== Third marriage and last years ==
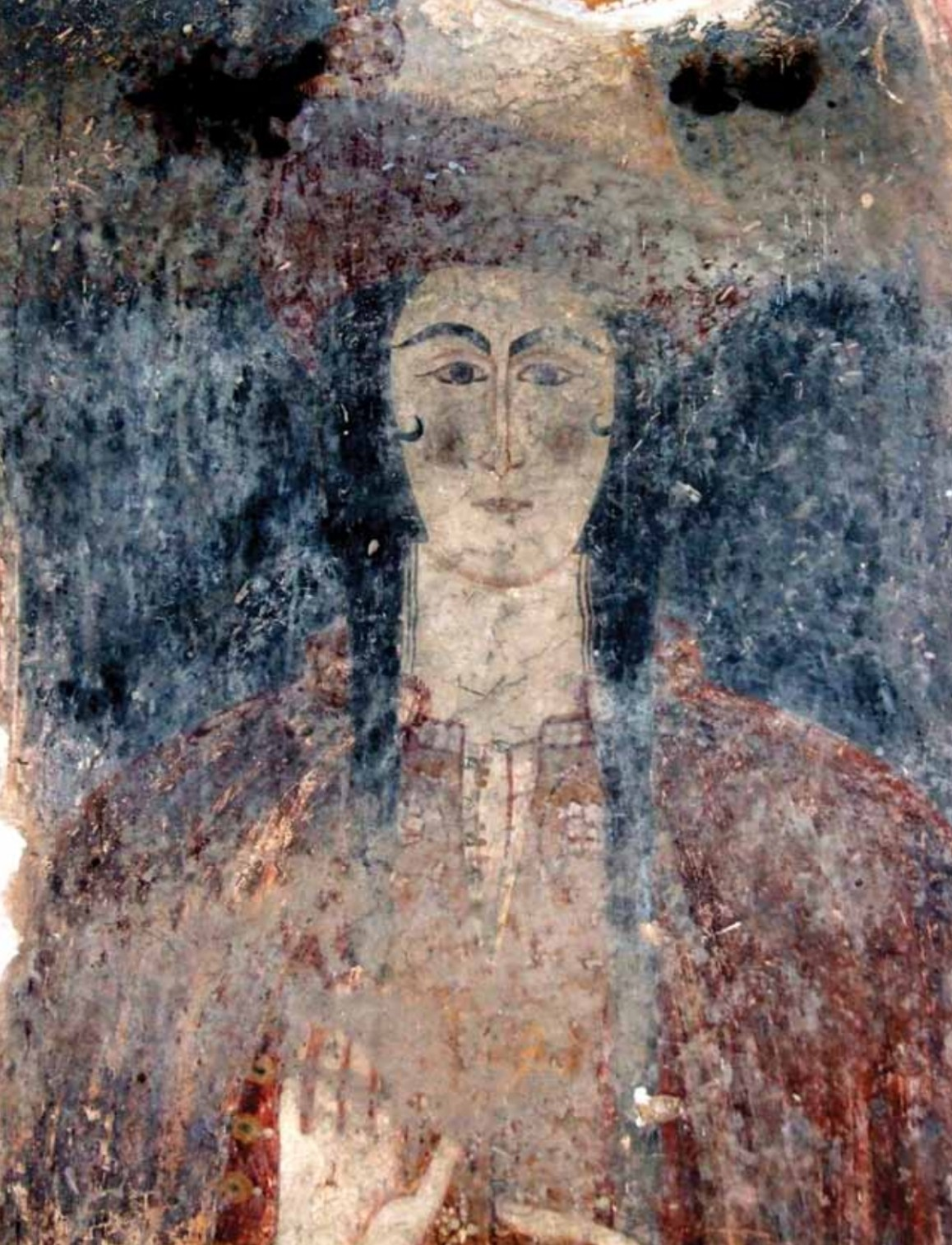
Fresco of Mariam Dadiani from the Tsalenjikha Cathedral.

Rostom died at the age of 93 in 1658. The Iranian officials at Tbilisi sent his remains to be buried in Qom, the "holy city" of Shia Islam, and ordered the queen dowager Mariam to relocate to the citadel of Tbilisi. She was summoned by the shah to Isfahan, but she sent Prince Papuna Tsitsishvili as a messenger carrying a lock of her grey heir to show that she was too old to travel to Iran and a letter assuring the shah of the loyalty of her family. Rostom's adopted son, the prince of Mukhrani, was confirmed as the new king under the name of Vakhtang V or, upon his adoption of Islam, Shah-Navaz Khan.

Pursuant to the shah's order, Vakhtang, then aged 40, reluctantly divorced Princess Rodam Orbeliani, by whom he had several children, and married his adopted mother, the queen dowager Mariam. On Vakhtang's accession large areas of Kartli were seething with unrest. Vakhtang's internal policy of patience and patronage coupled with Mariam's prestige among the Georgians relatively pacified Kartli. In the subsequent years, the aging queen Mariam was less actively involved in the politics, although she influenced her husband's decision to more energetically intervene in the power struggles in Mingrelia and Imereti in 1661. She also lent support to the church reforms undertaken by Patriarch Domentius III of Georgia.

Mariam died in 1682, during the reign of her step-son George XI, outliving her third husband by seven years. She was buried with full Reginal honors at the Svetitskhoveli Cathedral in Mtskheta, where her only son, Otia, had been interred.

== Ancestry ==
Ancestors of Mariam Dadiani (died 1682)

8. Levan I Dadiani
4. Mamia IV Dadiani
9. Marekhi N.
2. Manuchar I Dadiani
10. Rostom Gurieli
5. Elene Gurieli
11. Tinatin N.
1. Mariam Dadiani
12. Qvarqvare III Jaqeli
6. Kaikhosro II Jaqeli
13. Ana Shalikashvili
3. Tamar Jaqeli
14. Bagrat, Prince of Mukhrani
7. Dedisimedi of Mukhrani
15. Elene N.

== Notes ==
Preceded by Ketevan Abashishvili	Queen consort of Kartli; 1634–1658	Succeeded by Rodam Kaplanishvili-Orbeliani
Preceded by Rodam Kaplanishvili-Orbeliani	Queen consort of Kartli; 1659–1676	Succeeded by Tamar Davitashvili
