= Manuchar I Dadiani =

Prince of Mingrelia

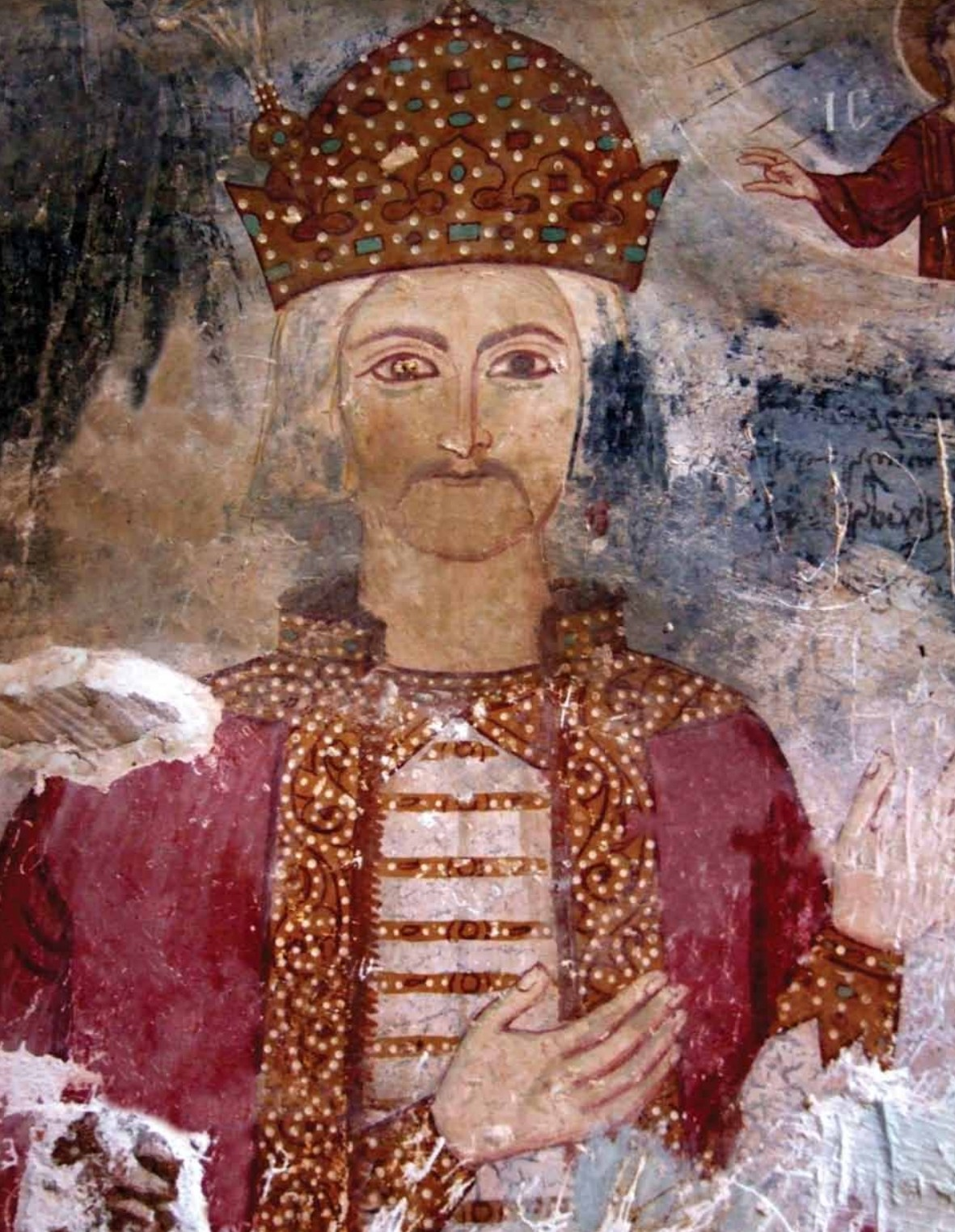
- Fresco of Manuchar I Dadiani from the Tsalenjikha Cathedral.

Prince of Mingrelia
- Reign: 1590–1611
- Predecessor: Mamia IV Dadiani
- Successor: Levan II Dadiani
- Died: 1611
- Spouse: Nestan-Darejan of Kakheti (m. 1596; died 1597) Tamar Jaqeli (m. 1598)
- Issue: Levan II Dadiani; Mariam; Jesse; Heraclius; Two unnamed daughters
- House: Dadiani
- Father: Levan I Dadiani
- Religion: Georgian Orthodox Church (Catholicate of Abkhazia)

Manuchar I Dadiani (Georgian: მანუჩარ I დადიანი; died 1611) of the House of Dadiani, was Prince of Mingrelia from 1590 until his death in 1611.

Manuchar ruled over Mingrelia, in western Georgia, in a period of continuous anarchy in the successor states of the former Kingdom of Georgia. Manuchar continued his predecessors' efforts to extend the Dadiani's influence over the Kingdom of Imereti, Mingrelia's nominal suzerain. He fought off an invasion led by King Simon I of Kartli, who sought to reunite all of Georgia under his aegis, and secured his protégé Rostom on the throne of Imereti, thereby briefly restoring relative peace in western Georgia. Manuchar died in a hunting accident and was succeeded by his son, Levan II Dadiani.

== Biography ==
Manuchar Dadiani was a younger son of Levan I Dadiani, Prince of Mingrelia. The date of his birth is unknown. He succeeded on the death of elder brother, Mamia IV Dadiani, in 1590. That same year, Simon I, King of Kartli in eastern Georgia, took advantage of instability in western Georgia and renewed his efforts to bring the Kingdom of Imereti under his control. He led his army, equipped with artillery, over the Likhi mountains into Imereti and forced its king Rostom, the Dadiani's nominee, into flight to Mingrelia. Dadiani offered to reinstate Rostom on terms of vassalage and himself promised peace and submission to Simon. The king of Kartli, however, insisted on Rostom being surrendered; else, he threatened to attack Mingrelia.

Manuchar responded with mobilization and, accompanied by Rostom and his loyalists, attacked Simon at Opshkviti, defeated him and captured his cannons. Simon fled to Kartli, while Rostom was restored in Imereti under Dadiani's protection. The two kings eventually reconciled and peace was reestablished, for the time being, in western Georgia. According to the 18th-century historian Prince Vakhushti, Manuchar died in a hunting incident, while pursuing a herd of deer, in 1611. He was succeeded by his son, Levan II Dadiani.

== Family ==
In 1596 (or 1591), Manuchar married Nestan-Darejan, daughter of Alexander II of Kakheti. She died after one year of marriage while giving birth to their only son:

- Levan II Dadiani (1597–1657), Prince of Mingrelia (r. 1611–1657).

In 1598 (or 1592), Manuchar married Tamar (born 1561), daughter of Kaikhosro II Jaqeli and widow of the noblemen Kaikhosro Oravzhandashvili and Vakhtang I Gurieli. Their children were:

- Mariam (died 1682), who successively married Simon II Gurieli, Rostom of Kartli, and Rostom's adopted son and successor, King Vakhtang V;
- Jesse (or Joseph), father of Levan III Dadiani. He may also have been the father of two other sons, Liparit III Dadiani and Mamuka;
- Heraclius (Erekle);
- An unnamed daughter, who was given in marriage by her brother Levan II to Shah Safi of Persia around 1634;
- An unnamed daughter, who was a nun at Martvili in 1640.

Manuchar I Dadiani House of Dadiani Born: ? Died: 1611
Regnal titles
Preceded by Mamia IV Dadiani	Prince of Mingrelia; 1590–1611	Succeeded by Levan II Dadiani
