= Mariam of Georgia =

Mariam of Georgia may refer to:

- Mariam of Vaspurakan (fl. 11th century), wife of George I of Georgia
- Maria of Alania (1050–1118), daughter of Bagrat IV of Georgia
- Mariam Tsitsishvili (1768–1850), wife of George XII of Georgia
- Princess Mariam of Georgia (1755–1828)
- Mariam, daughter of Bagrat IV of Georgia
