= Levan II Dadiani =

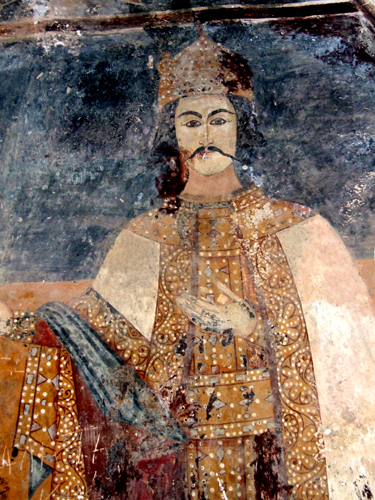
- Fresco of Levan II Dadiani

Prince of Mingrelia
- Reign: 1611–1657
- Predecessor: Manuchar I Dadiani
- Successor: Liparit III Dadiani
- Regent: George Lipartiani (1611–1616)
- Born: 1597
- Died: 1657 (aged 59–60)
- Spouses: Tamunia Shervashidze (m. 1618; div. 1622) Darejan Chiladze (died 1639)
- Issue: Zilihana; Alexander; Zira; Manuchar; Gul
- House: Dadiani
- Father: Manuchar I Dadiani
- Mother: Princess Nestan-Darejan of Kakheti
- Religion: Georgian Orthodox Church (Catholicate of Abkhazia)
- Khelrtva

Levan II Dadiani (also Leon; Georgian: ლევან [ლეონ] II დადიანი; 1597–1657) was a member of the House of Dadiani and ruler of the Principality of Mingrelia in western Georgia. Levan is known for his extensive raiding of neighboring countries and taking hostages for ransom.

== Early life ==
Levan was born in 1597, and was the eldest son of Manuchar I Dadiani and his only child by his first wife, Nestan-Darejan, daughter of Alexander II of Kakheti, who died during childbirth. After a year of mourning, Manuchar I married Tamar Jaqeli in 1598. Tamar, the widow of Vakhtang I Gurieli, brought with her Kaikhosro, her son from her previous marriage, while she and Manuchar had children together, including a son, Joseph (Jesse), and a daughter, Mariam.

After Manuchar took his second wife around 1598, King Alexander II of Kakheti, deeply saddened by his daughter's untimely death, requested that Manuchar send the young Levan to Kakheti to be raised there. Manuchar agreed, and Alexander II took charge of Levan's education. According to Prince Vakhushti, after the accession of David I of Kakheti in 1601-1602 (or 1603), Manuchar requested that Levan be returned to him. Despite his grief, Alexander II allowed him to go, sending him back to his father with rich gifts. According to the version of Beri Egnatashvili, however, Levan returned only after the death of Manuchar in 1611. This version is rejected by Ilia Antelava, who argues that if Manuchar had not brought Levan back during the reign of David I, he would certainly have done so after Alexander II was murdered in 1605.

Levan at the age of fourteen became prince of Mingrelia when his father Manuchar I fell from a horse and died while hunting. Initially, Levan ruled under the regency of his uncle, Giorgi I Lipartiani.

== Reign ==
In the 1620s, Levan allied with the Principality of Abkhazia and Principality of Guria against George III of Imeretia after George's son Alexander accused his wife Tamar of adultery and divorced her, sending her back to her father, Mamia II Gurieli. The alliance was further cemented when Levan's sister Mariam married Mamia's son Simon and Levan married Seteman Sharvashidze's daughter Tamunia. However, the alliance was shattered when Levan accused Tamunia of adultery, cut off her ears and nose and cast her from Mingrelia. He then invaded and looted Abkhazia, poisoned his two sons by Tamunia, then abducted and married Darejan Chiladze, the wife of his uncle and former regent, Giorgi I Lipartiani. He then repeatedly raided Imeretia and Abkhazia, confiscating livestock. While a common practice amongst the Mongols and Seljuks, Levan was the first to in the Caucausus to extensively take hostages for ransom, making raiding a profitable venture.

When Simon murdered his father and ascended to the Gurian throne in 1625, Levan demanded his sister back. Instead, Simon released Levan Dadiani's disgraced vizier Paata "Tsutski" Tsulukidze, who had been handed by Dadiani to Mamia Gurieli for custody. Tsulukidze and Gurieli plotted Levan's murder, but Dadiani survived their Abkhaz assassin and had Tsulukidze strangled and quartered, firing the remains from a cannon. Thereafter, he exploited the patricide committed by Simon as a casus belli and invaded Guria. Simon resisted, but was defeated at Lanchkhuti and taken prisoner. Levan had him blinded and replaced with Kaikhosro I Gurieli, the son of Vakhtang I Gurieli. Simon's wife and son were taken to Mingrelia.

Levan allied with Sultan Murad IV of the Ottoman Empire trading Turkish cavalry for smelted iron, slaves and wool.

In 1633, he allied to Rostom of Kartli, who married his sister Mariam. The alliance pleased the Persian shah Safi, who sent 1.5 tons of silver as a wedding present. George III of Imereti attempted to intercept Levan on his way to the marriage, but was defeated and taken prisoner.

In 1646 he destroyed the walls of Kutaisi with cannon fire and plundered the country. He blinded Prince Mamuka of Imereti, who had been planned as the future king to unite Georgia, for resisting his actions. This prompted King Rostom of Kartli to solemnly curse him. George III's successor, Alexander III took an oath of fealty to Tsar Alexis of Russia in hopes of ending Levan's devastation. However the Russian were still too far from South Caucasus and this move had virtually no effect on the course of events.

Throughout Levan's forty-six year reign he was known for practicing various forms of barbarity, mutilation and torture. He normalized the practice of holding prisoners for ransom, making war more profitable among warlords in western Georgia. He also encouraged commerce from foreign merchants and was known as a competent administrator. He spurred the practice of goldsmithing and used large amounts of wealth for the decoration of churches and monuments.

In March 1657, while despairing over his remaining son's corpse, he struck himself with a staff and dropped dead. He would be succeeded by his nephew Liparit III.

== Marriages and issue ==
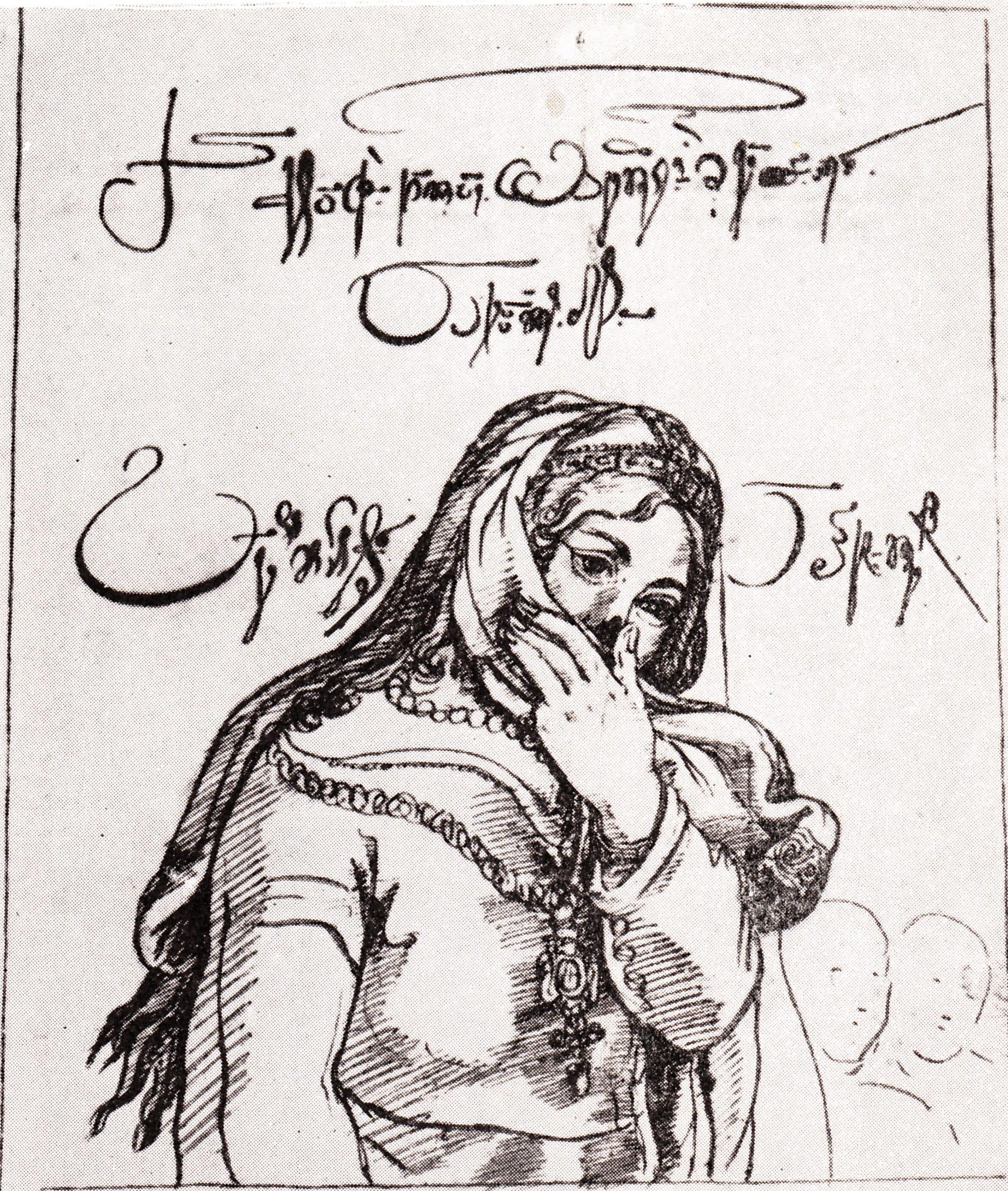
Levan's first wife Tamunia Shervashidze after her mutilation by him (drawing by Teramo Castelli)

=== First marriage ===
Levan II married firstly Princess Tamuria (also spelled Tamar, Tanuria, Tamunia, Tanuri) Sharvashidze, daughter of Prince Seteman Sharvashidze of Abkhazia. She was described as a "beautiful, benevolent, generous, courteous, and noble" woman.

While married to Princess Tamuria, Levan II fell in love with Princess Darejan Chiladze, herself already married too. To marry her, in 1622 The Prince unjustly accused his wife of adultery with Grand Vizir Paata Tsulukia, and had her nose, ears and tongue cut off as punishment. Eventually, he banished her from the court, and sent her back to her father, whose lands started being attacked by Levan as a revenge for the alleged adultery.

Their marriage produced two sons whose identity is unknown:

- Unknown Prince (? – ?), poisoned.

=== Second marriage ===
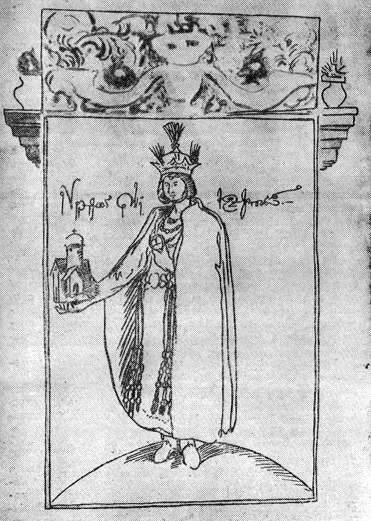
Princess Darejan Chiladze, Levan's second wife

After his divorce from Tamuria, he secondly married Princess Darejan Chiladze (died 1639), daughter of Prince Rovanoz Chiladze: she was kidnapped by Levan II, as she was already married, and her union with his uncle Giorgi I Lipartiani was dissolved. They had issue:

- Princess Zilihana (or Zilikhana, Zilikhan, Zilihan; born c. 1619);
- Prince Alexander (1625 ca. – 1657), who married a daughter of Kaikhosro I Gurieli;
- Princess Zira (1627 ca. – ?), who was promised in marriage to King Alexander III of Imereti' son Bagrat, but did not marry him;
- Prince Manuchar (1632 ca. – 1640);
- Princess Gul (? – ?), nicknamed "Rosa".

== Notes ==
Levan II Dadiani House of Dadiani Born: 1597 Died: 1657
Regnal titles
Preceded by Manuchar I Dadiani	Prince of Mingrelia; 1611–1657	Succeeded by Liparit III Dadiani
