= Liparit III Dadiani =

Liparit III Dadiani (Georgian: ლიპარიტ III დადიანი; died c. 1658) was Prince of Mingrelia, of the House of Dadiani, from 1657 until being deposed in 1658.

Liparit III Dadiani's brief tenure took place against the background of renewed anarchy in western Georgian principalities. A son of the blinded Mingrelian prince Iese, Liparit succeeded on the death of his paternal uncle, the dynamic and imperious Levan II Dadiani, in 1657. Liparit's succession was opposed by his relative Vameq Lipartiani. Vameq, lord of Salipartiano, secured support of King Alexander III of Imereti for his cause, but had to concede the border territory Levan had seized from Imereti as well as much of Levan Dadiani's treasury and several Mingrelian noblemen as hostages. In turn, Liparit requested aid from King Rostom of Kartli and the Ottoman pasha of Akhaltsikhe.

At the decisive battle of Bandza in June 1658, Liparit and his half-brother and ally, Kaikhosro I Gurieli, Prince of Guria, were decisively defeated by Vameq and his Imeretian allies. Liparit's Kartlian auxiliaries were taken prisoner and had to be ransomed. Liparit himself fled to Constantinople, where he soon died. Vameq was confirmed as Prince of Mingrelia and Alexander restored Imereti's hegemony of western Georgia.

Liparit III Dadiani House of Dadiani Born: ? Died: c. 1658
Regnal titles
Preceded by Levan II Dadiani	Prince of Mingrelia; 1657–1658	Succeeded by Vameq III Dadiani
