= Simon II Gurieli =

Prince of Guria

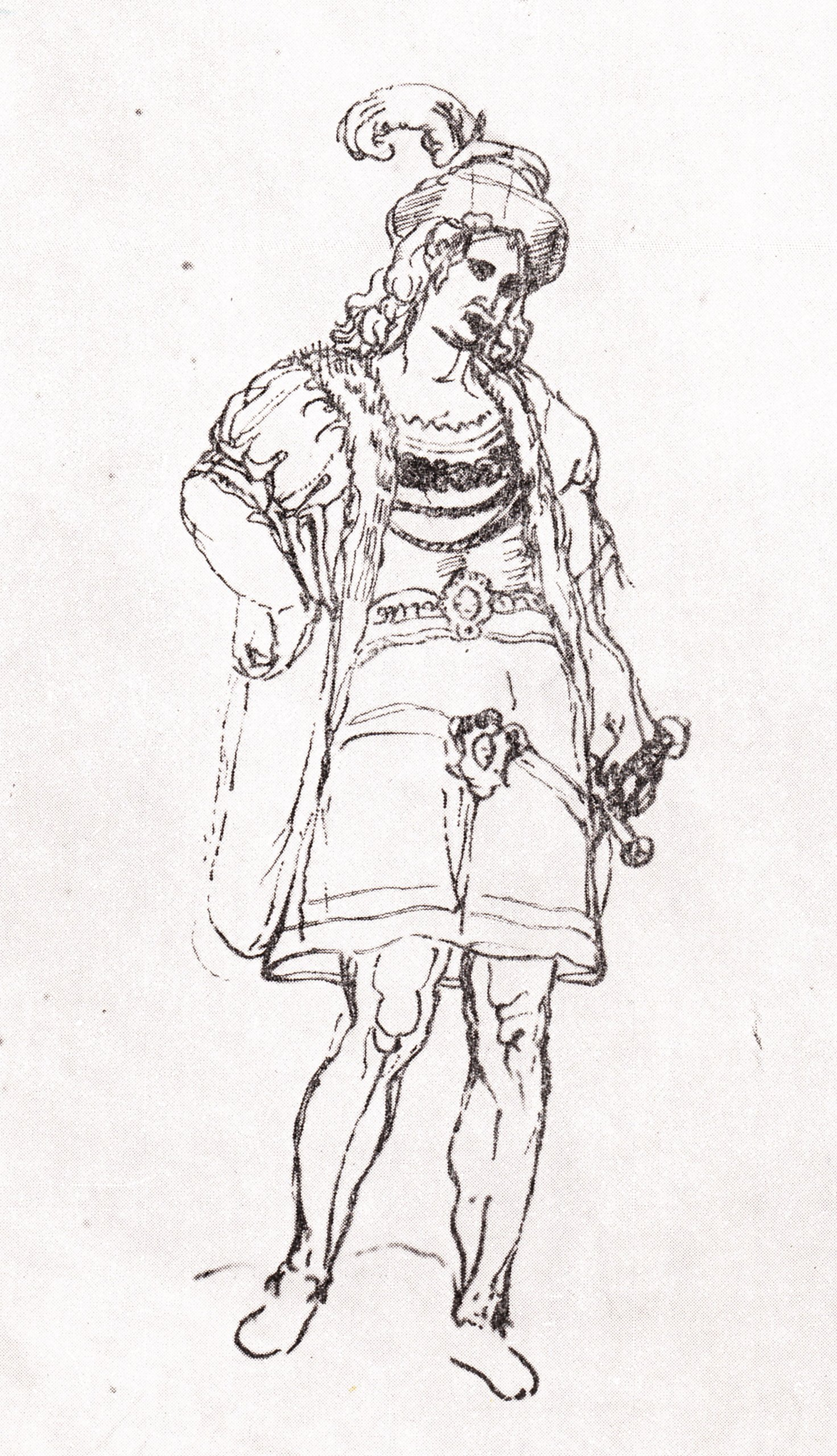
- Simon Gurieli, a sketch from Teramo Castelli's travelogue.

Prince of Guria
- Reign: 1625
- Predecessor: Mamia II Gurieli
- Successor: Malakia I Gurieli
- Born: 1606
- Died: c. 1672
- Spouse: Mariam Dadiani (m. 1621; div. 1625)
- Issue: Otia Gurieli; Demetrius Gurieli (adopted)
- House: Gurieli
- Father: Mamia II Gurieli
- Mother: Tinatin Jaqeli
- Religion: Georgian Orthodox Church (Catholicate of Abkhazia)

Simon II Gurieli (Georgian: სიმონ II გურიელი, 1606 – c. 1672), of the House of Gurieli, was Prince of Guria in 1625. He acceded to power in Guria, a small principality in southwest Georgia, after having murdered his father, Mamia II Gurieli, and was dethroned and blinded by his brother-in-law Levan II Dadiani, Prince of Mingrelia. Simon thereafter became a monk and retired to Jerusalem.

== Reign ==
Simon was a son of Mamia II Gurieli, Prince of Guria, by his wife Tinatin Jaqeli. In 1625, Simon murdered his father while sleeping and seized the princely throne of Guria. He sought redemption in making donations to the Achi Monastery.

On his accession, Simon quickly came into conflict with Levan II Dadiani of Mingrelia, whose sister Mariam he had married in 1621. Dadiani's political ambitions and territorial expansionism was a source of concern for the Gurieli. Simon released Levan Dadiani's disgraced vizier Paata "Tsutski" Tsulukidze, who had been handed by Dadiani to Mamia Gurieli for custody. Tsulukidze and Gurieli plotted Levan's murder, but Dadiani survived their Abkhaz assassin and had Tsulukidze strangled and quartered, firing the remains from a cannon. Thereafter, he exploited the patricide committed by Simon as a casus belli and invaded Guria. Simon resisted, but was defeated at Lanchkhuti and made prisoner. Dadiani had him blinded and replaced with his client, Kaikhosro I Gurieli. Simon's wife and son were taken to Mingrelia.

== Retirement ==
Having lost his throne, sight, and family, Simon, once freed from captivity, retired to Jerusalem and became a monk there. He stayed in touch with his former wife, who went on to become queen-consort of Kartli as the wife of two successive kings, Rostom and Vakhtang V. Simon was still alive and residing in Georgia in 1672, when the Frenchman Jean Chardin was travelling in the Caucasus. According to Chardin, Mariam hosted her seasoned and frail ex-husband at the border with Imereti and gave him some means to survive. King Vakhtang V was jealous but Mariam dismissed his concerns with laughter, asking "whether he were not asham'd to be jealous of a poor, old, blind, miserable creature, and altogether as impotent as himself."

== Family ==
Simon Gurieli had one son:

- Otia (died 1645), who followed his mother Mariam in Kartli and died there.

== Bibliography ==
- Toumanoff, Cyril (1976). Manuel de Généalogie et de Chronologie pour l'histoire de la Caucasie chrétienne (Arménie, Géorgie, Albanie) [Manual of Genealogy and Chronology of Christian Caucasian History (Armenia, Georgia, Albania)] (in French). Rome: Edizioni Aquila.

Simon II Gurieli House of Gurieli
Regnal titles
| Preceded by Mamia II Gurieli | Prince of Guria; 1625 | Succeeded by Malakia I Gurieli |
