= Alexander III of Imereti =

Alexander III
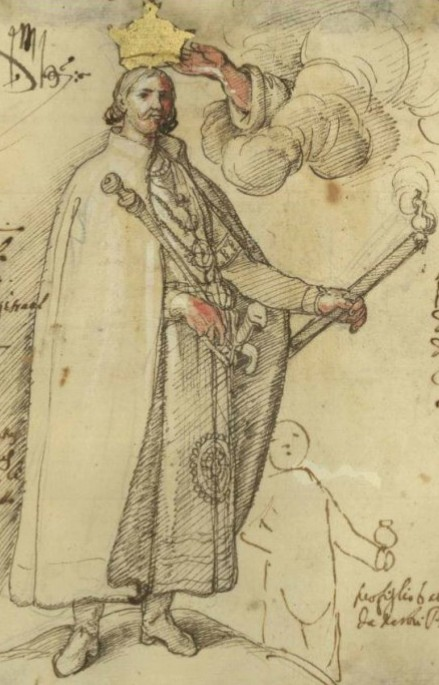
- Alexander III by Teramo Castelli.

King of Imereti
- Reign: 1639–1660
- Predecessor: George III
- Successor: Bagrat IV
- Died: 1 March 1660
- Spouse: Tamar Gurieli (m. 1618; div. 1620) Darejan of Kakheti (m. 1631)
- Issue Among others: Bagrat IV of Imereti
- Dynasty: Bagrationi
- Father: George III of Imereti
- Mother: Tamar
- Religion: Georgian Orthodox Church (Catholicate of Abkhazia)

Alexander III (Georgian: ალექსანდრე III, romanized: aleksandre III; died 1 March 1660), was a Georgian king (mepe) of the Bagrationi dynasty, who reigned as king of Imereti in Western Georgia from 1639 to 1660.

Locked in power struggle with his regional rivals for several decades, Alexander allied himself with the Tsardom of Russia in order to gain an upper hand, but with little success. Ultimately, Alexander was able to establish control over the entirety of Western Georgia on his own, restoring some of Imereti's lost prestige; however, this consolidation proved relatively short lived. By the time of Alexander's death in 1660, Western Georgia had reverted to the state of internal struggles and instability, which had become characteristic of Georgia as a whole following the collapse of the Georgian realm.

== Reign ==
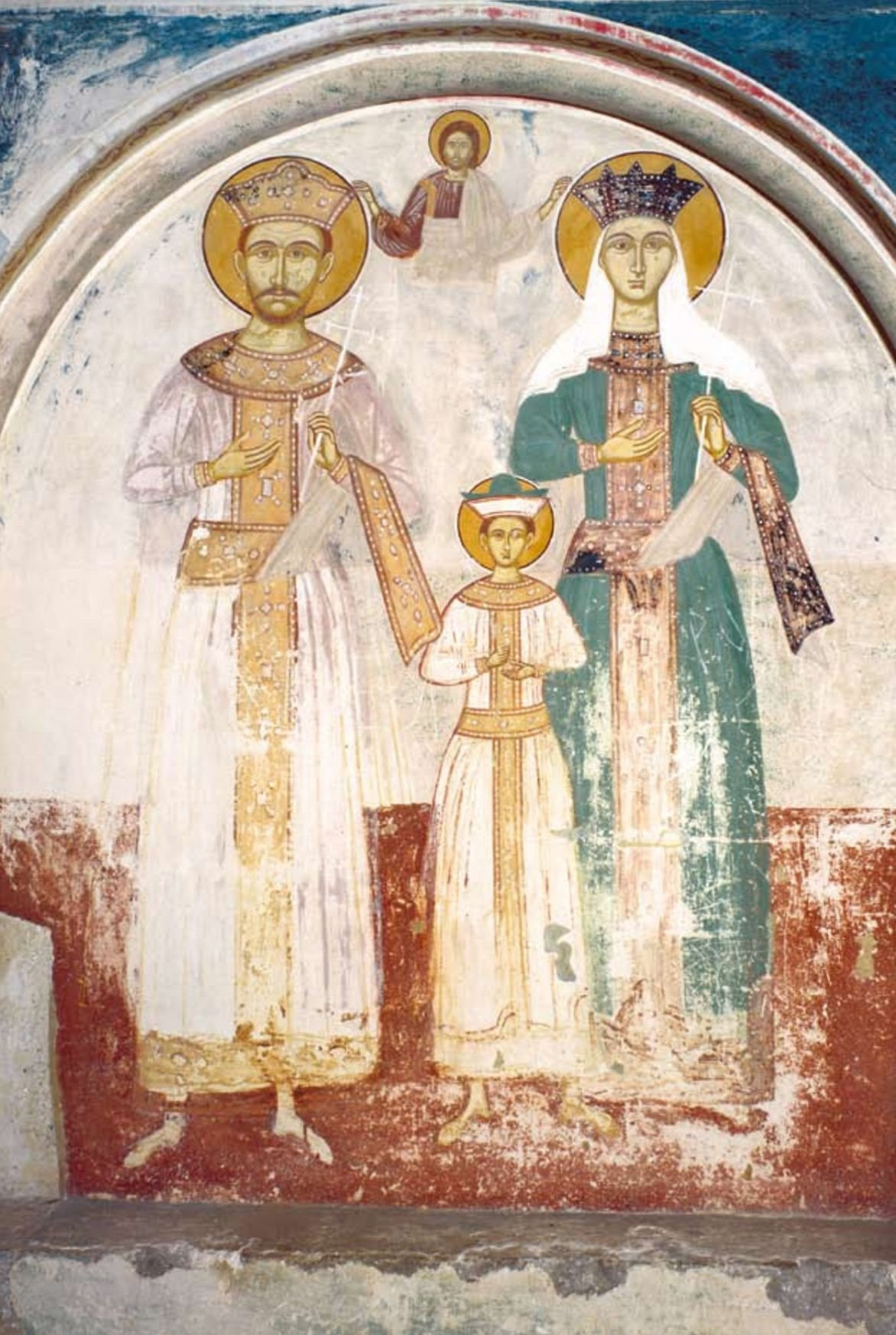
Fresco at Gelati Monastery depicting the young Alexander with his parents, King George III and Queen Tamar.

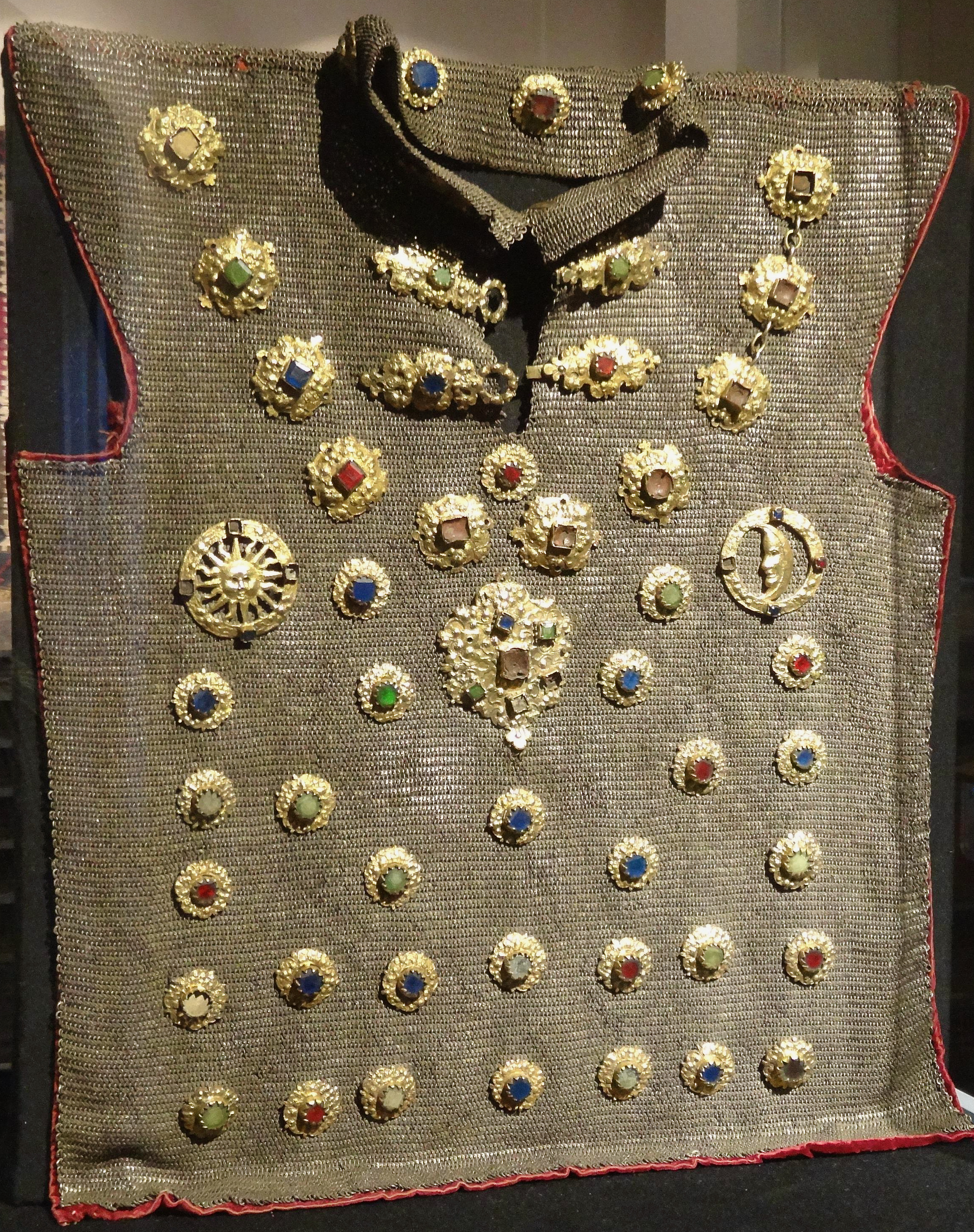
Alexander's mail shirt, complete with gold and gemstones

Alexander succeeded upon the death of his father, George III of Imereti, in 1639. At this time, Imereti was very weakened but Alexander struggled to stabilize the situation due to incessant raids from Levan II Dadiani, the powerful ruler of the neighboring Georgian principality of Mingrelia, who refused to acknowledge the king of Imereti as his overlord, and aspired to displace him from his throne. In one of the battles, Dadiani captured and blinded Alexander's energetic brother Mamuka, bringing the king to the edge of despair. At one point, Alexander was forced to seek assistance from the Ottoman Empire against Mingrelia, resulting in Ottoman raids on the Mingrelian principality and Dranda; this distraction forced Levan II to halt raids on Imereti but only temporarily. Alexander's father-in-law, Teimuraz I of Kakheti, attempted to mediate the conflict between Western Georgian princes, but without success. After the Mingrelian prince conducted several successful raids against Imereti, at the advice of his father-in-law Alexander started making overtures to the Tsardom of Russia for help.

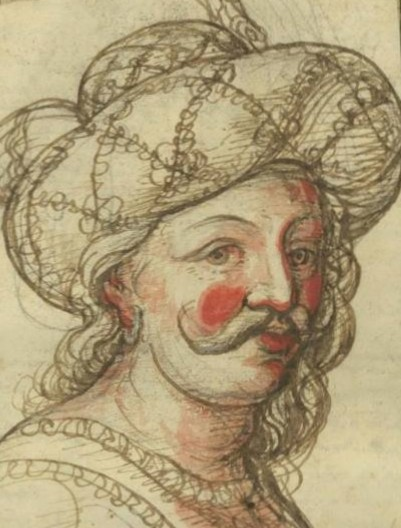
Alexander III by Teramo Castelli.

As this feudal conflict unfolded, both Mingelian and Imeretian rulers sought Russian support in their cause. Envoys from Moscow visited Mingrelia in 1639/40, though without achieving any positive results. In response to an appeal from Alexander, another embassy arrived in the Imeretian capital of Kutaisi in 1651. In the presence of these Russian ambassadors, on 9 October 1651, Alexander took an oath of fealty to Tsar Alexis Mikhailovich on behalf of Imereti and its people. However, since the Russians were still too far from the Caucasus, this move had little practical effect on the course of events locally.

In 1657, Levan II died suddenly without leaving a direct heir. Alexander III took advantage of this, immediately marched into Mingrelia, subdued its nobles and installed his own nominee, Vameq, as prince; other pretenders to the Mingrelian throne were defeated by Alexander in a subsequent battle near Bandza. In 1659, Alexander turned his attention to the Principality of Guria, intervening against the refractory prince Kaikhosro I and replacing him with Alexander's protégé Demetre Gurieli. Thus, for a short time, the authority of the crown of Imereti was reestablished throughout much of western Georgia, returning the prestige that Imereti had lost for decades.

== Family ==
Alexander was married twice. His first wife was Tamar Gurieli, daughter of Mamia II Gurieli, whom Alexander married in 1618 and divorced in 1620. He married secondly, in 1631, Nestan-Darejan, daughter of Teimuraz I of Kakheti. Alexander III's children were:

- Bagrat IV of Imereti (1620–1681), King of Imereti (1660–1681);
- Princess Tinatin (fl. 1661–1680), who was married to the nobleman Lasha-Giorgi Goshadze and then to Levan III Dadiani.

Preceded by George III	King of Imereti; 1639–1660	Succeeded by Bagrat IV
