= Teramo Castelli =

Italian missionary (1597–1659)

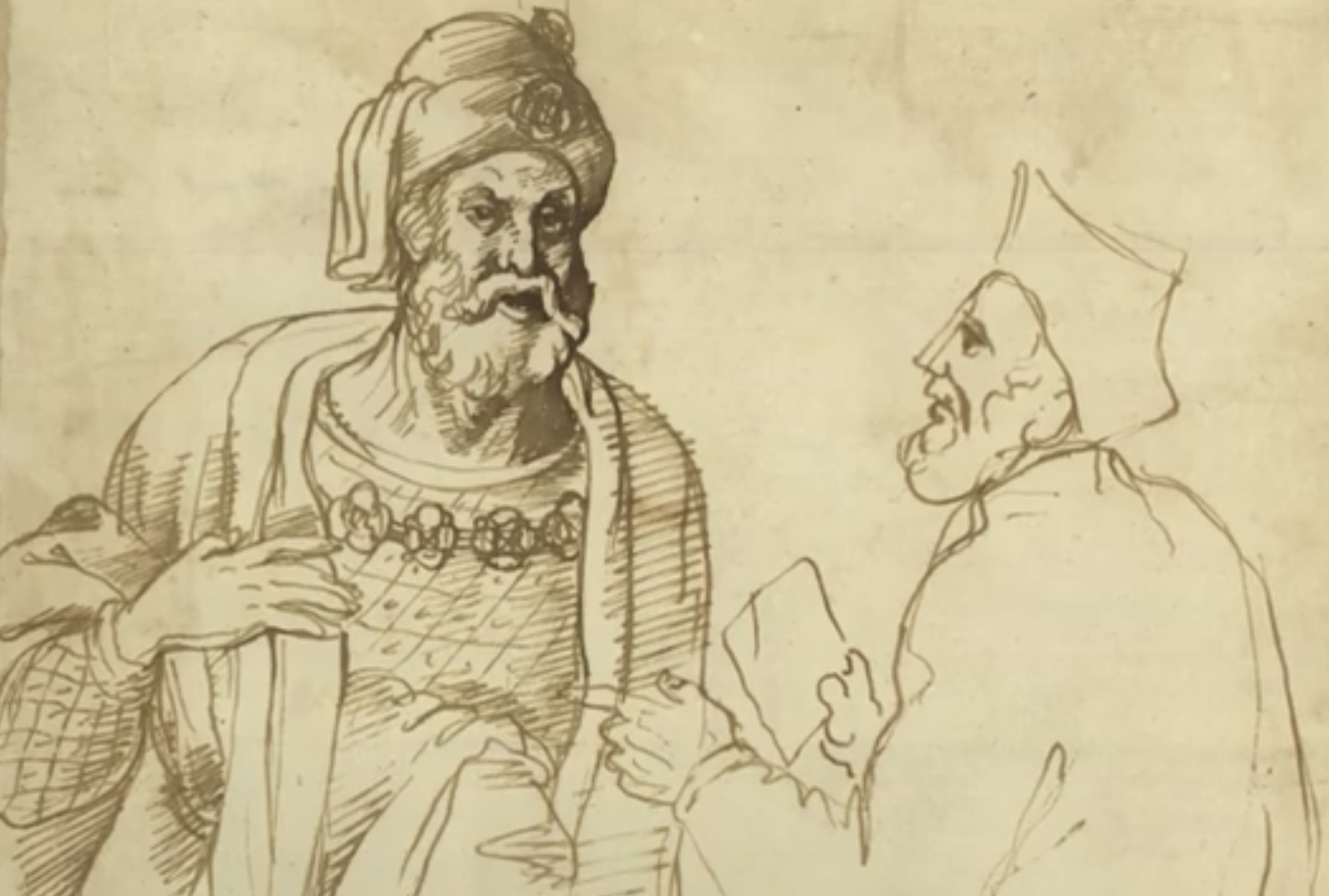
- Teramo Castelli (right) speaking with King Teimuraz I of Kakheti
- Born: 1597
- Died: 3 October 1659 (aged 61–62)

Teramo Cristoforo Castelli (1597 – 3 October 1659) was an Italian Theatine missionary, born of a noble family, who spent twenty-two years in Georgia from 1632 to 1654. He left seven volumes of travel notes and pen-and-ink sketches and other illustrations, mainly of the people and landscapes of Georgia. This manuscript was discovered and delivered to the municipal library of Palermo by the priest Gioacchino di Marzo in 1878 and brought to the attention of scholars of Georgia by Michel Tamarati in 1910.

== Sources ==
- Cajani, Luigi (1978). "Castelli, Teramo". Dizionario Biografico degli Italiani (in Italian). Vol. 21: Caruso–Castelnuovo. Rome: Istituto dell'Enciclopedia Italiana. ISBN 978-88-12-00032-6.
