= Vakhtang V =

King of Kartli from 1658 to 1676

King of Kartli
- Reign: 1658–1676
- Predecessor: Rostom
- Successor: George XI

Prince of Mukhrani
- Reign: 1629–1658
- Predecessor: Prince David of Kakheti
- Successor: Constantine I
- Died: September 1676; Khoskaro, near Ganja
- Burial: Qom, Iran
- Spouse: Rodam Qaplanishvili (div. 1659) Mariam Dadiani (m. 1659)
- Issue Among others: Archil II; George XI; Prince Levan; Prince Luarsab
- Dynasty: Mukhrani
- Father: Teimuraz I, Prince of Mukhrani
- Mother: Ana of Aragvi
- Religion: Georgian Orthodox Church, later Shia Islam
- Khelrtva

Vakhtang V (Georgian: ვახტანგ V; died September 1676), also known as Shah-Navaz Khan (Georgian: შაჰ-ნავაზ ხანი, romanized: shah-navaz khani), was a king (mepe) of the Georgian Kingdom of Kartli, a Prince of Mukhrani under the names Vakhtang II and Bakhuta Beg, and a statesman in Safavid Iran. He belonged to the House of Mukhrani, a collateral branch of the royal Bagrationi dynasty. Vakhtang V was the first king of Kartli from the Mukhrani line, a dynasty that ruled Kartli until 1727.

Born into the princely house that had governed the region of Mukhrani in central Georgia since the early 16th century, Vakhtang was the eldest son of Prince Teimuraz I, Prince of Mukhrani. He did not immediately succeed his father upon the latter’s death in 1625 but came to power around 1634 during the Persian invasion. An ally of the pro-Persian government of Kartli, Vakhtang was named heir by the childless King Rostom Khan in 1653. Before assuming administrative authority over the Kingdom of Kartli, he was required to convert to Islam. During his five-year regency, Vakhtang sought unsuccessfully to reconcile with the powerful Georgian nobility, which had remained unified only under Rostom’s rule. Upon Vakhtang’s accession to the throne in 1658, these nobles rebelled against him.

Although Vakhtang V ruled Kartli as a Christian monarch, he was recognized internationally merely as a wali (governor) under the Safavid Empire. Persian influence strongly shaped both his domestic and foreign policies, culminating in the bloody Bakhtrioni uprising of 1660. Following this conflict, Vakhtang asserted full control over Kakheti. He also extended his authority into western Georgia, invading Imereti and Mingrelia, thereby becoming the first Georgian ruler since the 15th century to hold sway over nearly all Georgian territories. Nevertheless, he was compelled to abandon his ambitions of national unification to avoid provoking a conflict between Persia and the Ottoman Empire.

Throughout his reign, Vakhtang V faced numerous challenges, including revolts led by the dukes Zaal and Otar of Aragvi. He pursued efforts to centralize authority and curtail the autonomy of the nobility. Engaged in repeated conflicts with Prince Heraclius of Kakheti, Vakhtang eventually consolidated control over the province by appointing his son Archil II as its ruler. His reign was also marked by a program of cultural, economic, and demographic renewal. Vakhtang’s downfall came when his growing power aroused the suspicion of the new Persian shah, Suleiman I, who summoned him to Persia. It was during this journey that Vakhtang V died in 1676.

== Early life ==
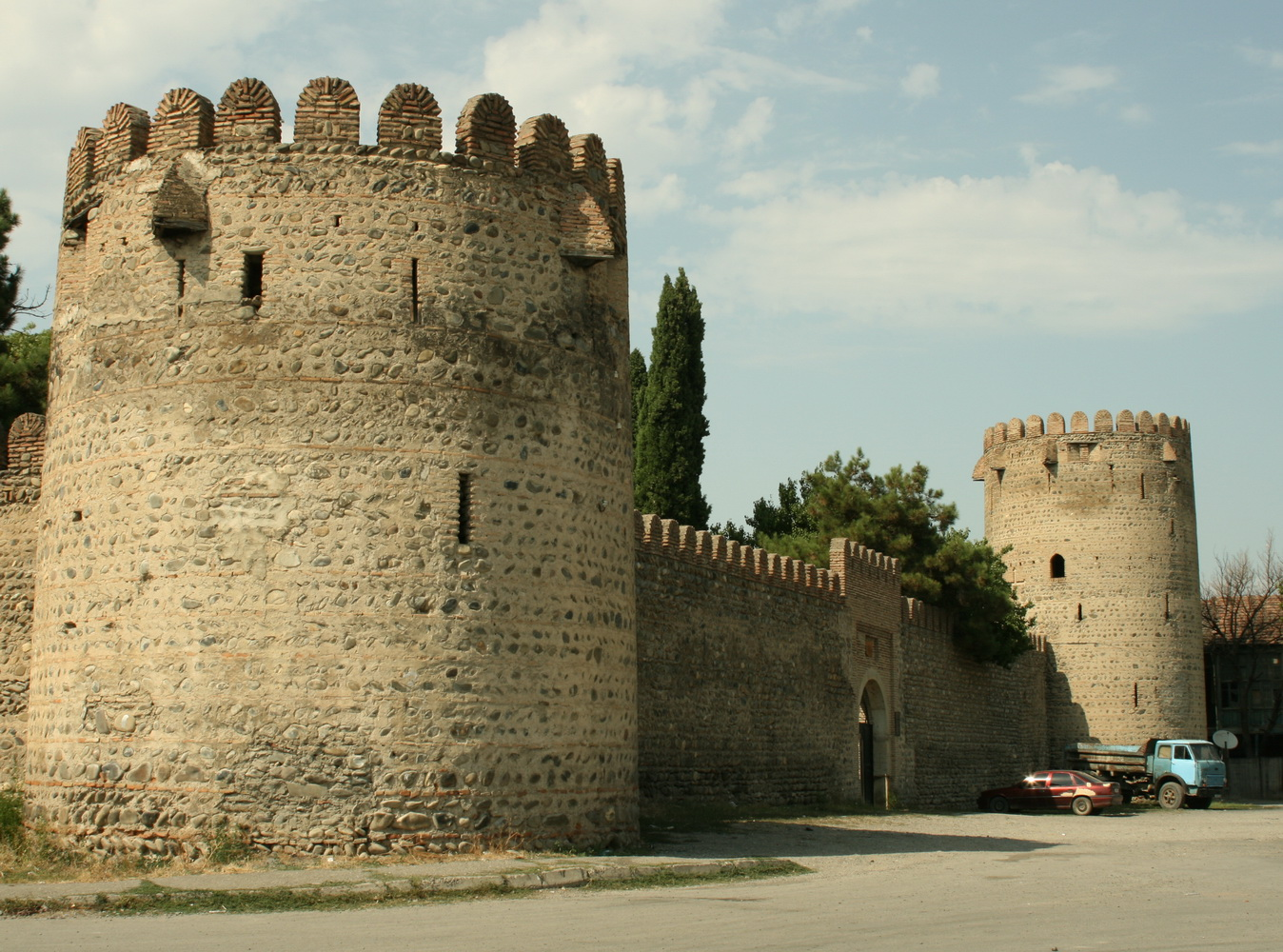
Vakhtang spent his youth in the fortress of Mukhrani, his father's residence.

Vakhtang was the eldest son of Teimuraz I, Prince of Mukhrani, and his wife, Ana, daughter of Nugzar, Duke of Aragvi. He descended from a cadet branch of the Bagrationi dynasty, which had governed a province of Shida Kartli since the early 16th century. From an early age, Vakhtang was educated as the heir to a powerful principality, and by the age of five, his family had begun his training in the military arts.

His father, Teimuraz I, soon became one of the leaders of the Christian rebellion against Safavid Iran, which at that time occupied the kingdoms of Kartli and Kakheti. In 1623, he was appointed regent of Kartli by the northern Georgian nobility. However, he was killed in battle in 1625. The domain of Mukhrani then passed to Teimuraz's brother, Kaikhosro. Kaikhosro was later defeated during King Teimuraz I of Kakheti’s invasion of Kartli in 1627 and fled into exile in the Ottoman Empire, while his wife and nephews, including young Vakhtang, sought refuge in Imereti at the court of King George III of Imereti.

After an unsuccessful attempt by the exiled family to reclaim their ancestral lands, the Principality of Mukhrani came under the control of Prince David of Kakheti. Meanwhile, the entire region was engulfed in civil conflict between pro-Safavid and Christian factions, with Mukhrani situated at the heart of the struggle and temporarily administered by the Duchy of Aragvi. Following the death of Shah Abbas I in 1629, divisions emerged among the pro-Persian party. King Simon II of Kartli confiscated Mukhrani from Zurab, Duke of Aragvi and invited Vakhtang to rule the principality as Vakhtang II of Mukhrani. A few months later, Simon II was killed by the Duke of Aragvi, Teimuraz of Kakheti retook control of Kartli, and the fate of both Mukhrani and Vakhtang once again became uncertain.

In 1634, Prince Vakhtang—whose exact status during this period remains unclear, though he continued to be regarded as one of the most influential nobles in central Georgia—was the first to pledge allegiance to the Persian-Georgian general Rostom Khan, who invaded Kartli with Safavid forces. Vakhtang met Rostom at Khunan in Persia, and his support encouraged the Baratashvili clan to join the general’s cause as well. In Tbilisi, Rostom was proclaimed King of Kartli as a vassal of Persia, and the rebels were defeated.

== Prince of Mukhrani ==
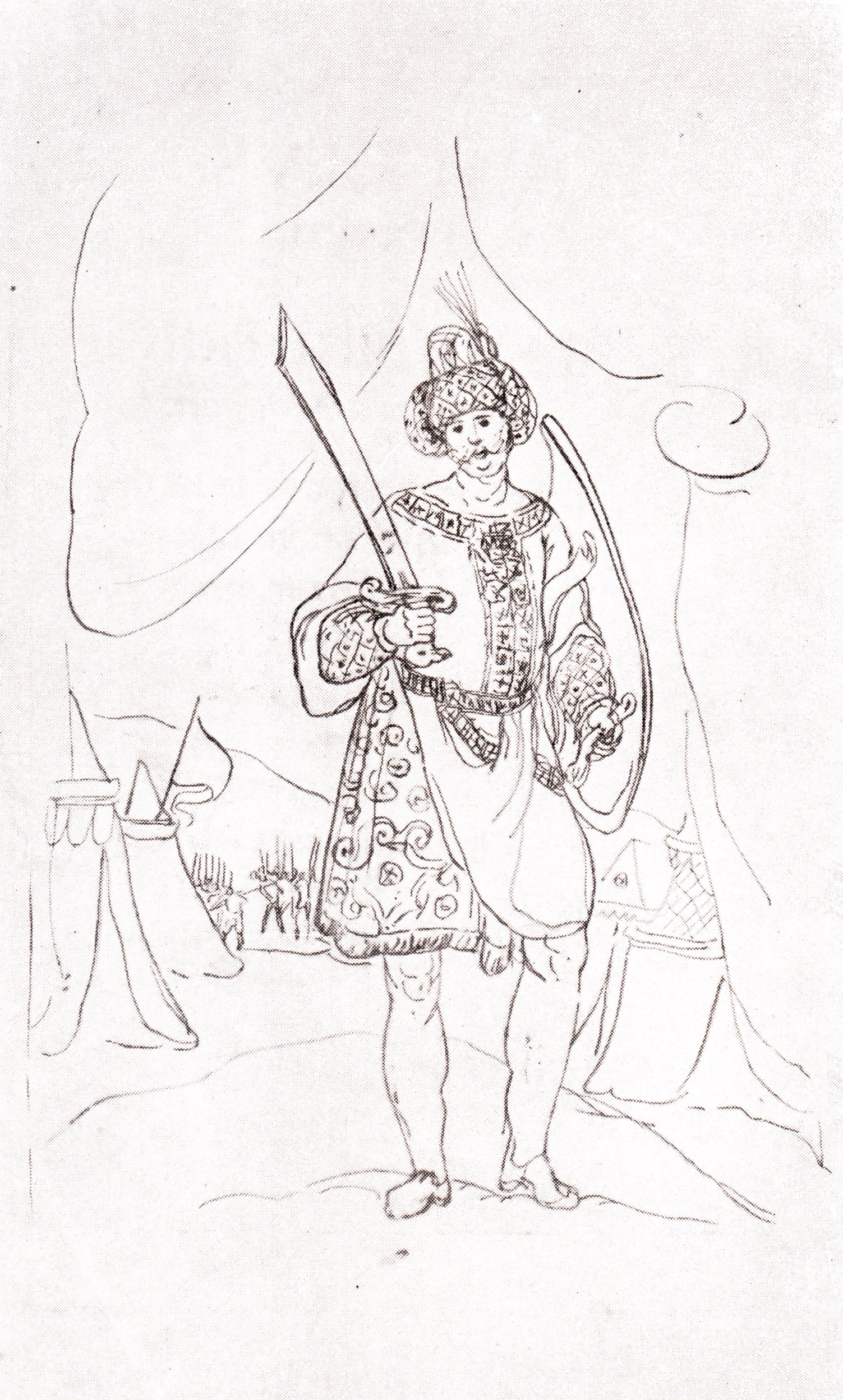
Bakhuta Beg had a complicated relationship with King Rostom Khan in the 1630s.

The rise of Rostom Khan to power consolidated Vakhtang II’s authority over Mukhrani, which he governed under the Muslim name Bakhuta Beg. In 1635, Vakhtang acted as mediator in negotiations between the central government and the rebel Datuna, Duke of Aragvi, his maternal uncle, hosting both the king, his troops, and the duke in Mukhrani. The talks failed, and Datuna was assassinated in Vakhtang’s fortress by Rostom Khan’s guards. Rostom then used Mukhrani as a base for his campaign to invade the Aragvian province of Dusheti.

This episode altered Vakhtang’s relationship with the royal court in Tbilisi. That same year, Teimuraz I of Kakheti, then in exile in Imereti, returned to his former kingdom with the support of the Prince of Mukhrani. Accompanied by Prince Iotam Amilakhvari, Vakhtang visited Teimuraz in Kakheti to plan an invasion of Kartli. After Rostom Khan failed to obtain reinforcements from Persia, Teimuraz entered Kartli and formed an alliance with Vakhtang II and the Duchy of Ksani, laying siege to Gori with Mukhranian troops. The nocturnal assault was unsuccessful, forcing Vakhtang and Teimuraz to retreat to the villages of Ikorta and Artsevi within Ksani territory. They regrouped and attacked Gori again but were decisively defeated by Rostom Khan in a bloody battle. Rostom’s forces ravaged Mukhrani, and Vakhtang II was forced to flee to Saeristo.

Following this defeat, Vakhtang returned to Rostom Khan’s sphere of influence. In 1638, he warned the king of an impending invasion by Teimuraz, prompting Rostom to dispatch the Georgian catholicos Evdemon to persuade Teimuraz to withdraw to Kakheti. Two years later, another invasion plot emerged, this time supported by Zaal, Duke of Aragvi and Iotam Amilakhvari, who gathered their forces at Akhalgori. On 24 December 1640, Rostom Khan sent a message to Prince Vakhtang requesting the aid of Mukhranian troops. Later that night, he sent another letter stating:

“We are arriving with many men; come and join us with your people in good order, so that, with God’s help, we may attack without waiting for dawn.”

Rostom arrived in Mukhrani that very night, where he was received by Vakhtang II. On the morning of 25 December, their combined forces launched a surprise assault on Akhalgori, catching the rebels off guard as they attended the Christmas Mass. During the battle, Vakhtang distinguished himself as a formidable warrior, while the rebel nobles suffered a crushing defeat. Afterward, Rostom, Vakhtang, and their soldiers shared the Christmas feast that had been prepared for the vanquished.

In the spring of 1642, Rostom Khan led an invasion of Kakheti with Iranian troops. Vakhtang and his Mukhranian forces were tasked with capturing Teimuraz in Tianeti, confronting him in the Battle of Ughlisi. Vakhtang’s soldiers killed the Kakhetian general Revaz Cholokashvili, forcing Teimuraz to flee eastward into Kakheti, where he was pursued by Rostom.

== Heir of Rostom ==
=== Appointment ===
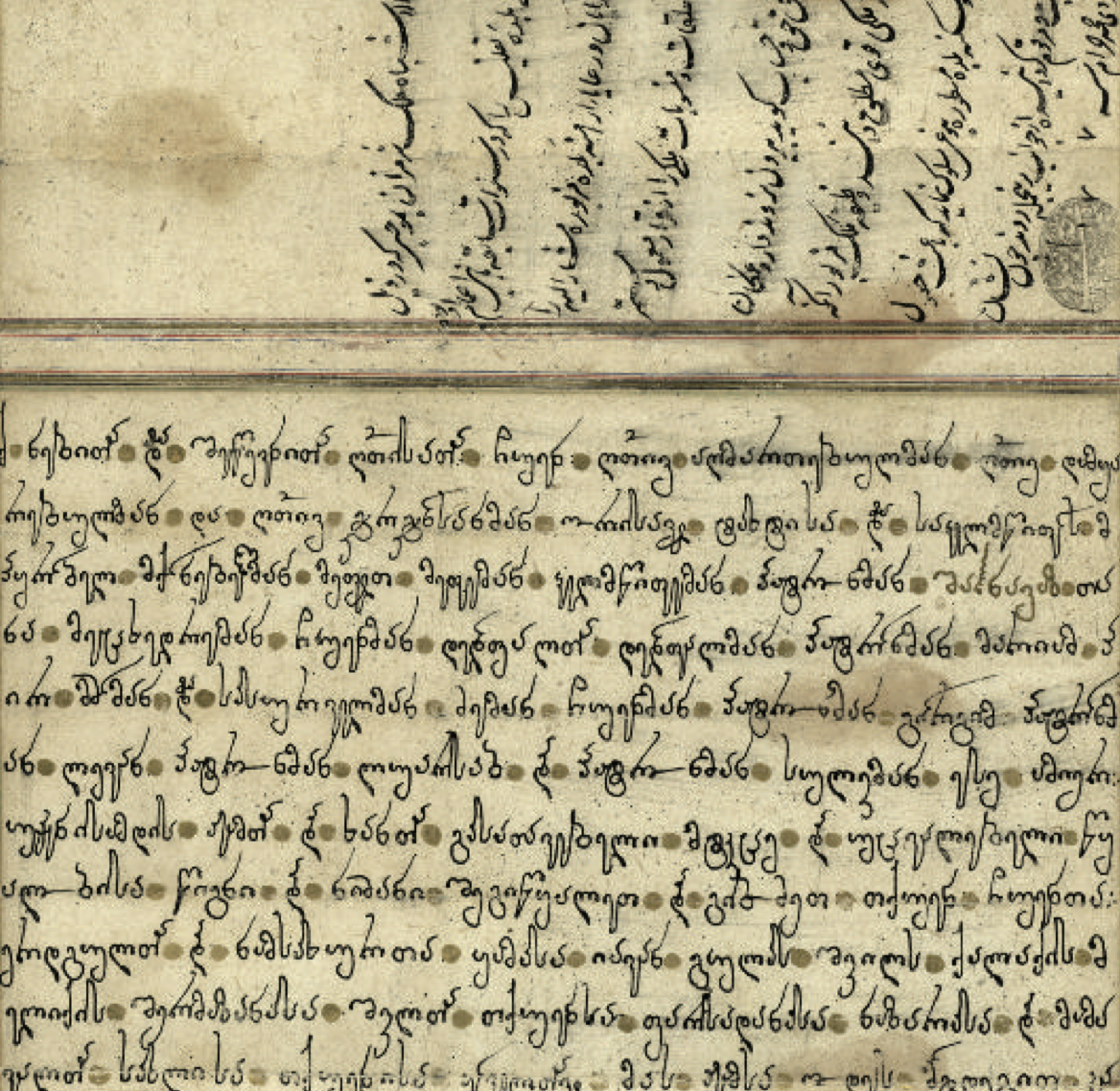
Royal charter of Vakhtang V in Persian and Georgian.

As King Rostom had no legitimate sons, he adopted Prince Luarsab as his heir. However, Luarsab died under mysterious circumstances during hunting in 1652, an event widely regarded at the Persian court as a political assassination. These suspicions prompted Prince Vakhtang, Luarsab’s younger brother and lord of Qazvin, to decline the offer to become the king’s adopted son and successor, fearing a similar fate. Vakhtang himself died later that same year. Consequently, Rostom resolved to adopt the ambitious Bakhuta Beg (Vakhtang II of Mukhrani) as his son and heir to the throne.

Parsadan Gorgijanidze, a close adviser to King Rostom, was dispatched to the court of Shah Abbas II to seek the monarch’s approval for Vakhtang’s adoption. This mission is recorded in Henri Brenner’s Series regnum Iberiae. In response, the Shah requested a portrait of the Prince of Mukhrani, which he received two weeks later, reportedly influencing his favorable decision. After receiving the Shah’s confirmation, Vakhtang was officially adopted in 1653 and sent to Persia, where he was received with great honor by the Shah. During his stay, the Georgian diplomatic delegation led by Gorgijanidze informed the Shah of the death of Vakhtang Rostom Mirza and formally requested the recognition of Bakhuta Beg as heir to the throne. While in Isfahan, Vakhtang converted to Islam and adopted the name Shah Navaz Khan, meaning “monarch of delights” or “beloved of the Shah”.

In Persia, he was appointed governor of Isfahan and of Gilan before returning to Georgia. Upon his return, Vakhtang began referring to himself as Rostom’s son in official documents. Although royal decrees referred to him by his Muslim name, Shah Navaz Khan, he continued to use the name Vakhtang in order to maintain the support of the Christian population of Kartli. The retainers of both King Rostom and Queen Mariam were compelled to swear allegiance to the new crown prince, who was granted an apanage consisting of several villages in the district of Savakhtaago.

=== Intervention in Imereti ===
In Tbilisi, the aging king, then eighty-six years old, placed great trust in his newly adopted son—a distinction that Prince Luarsab had never fully enjoyed. Rostom appointed Shah Navaz Khan as administrator of Kartli, entrusting him with the day-to-day governance of the kingdom, as well as command of the Kartlian armed forces.

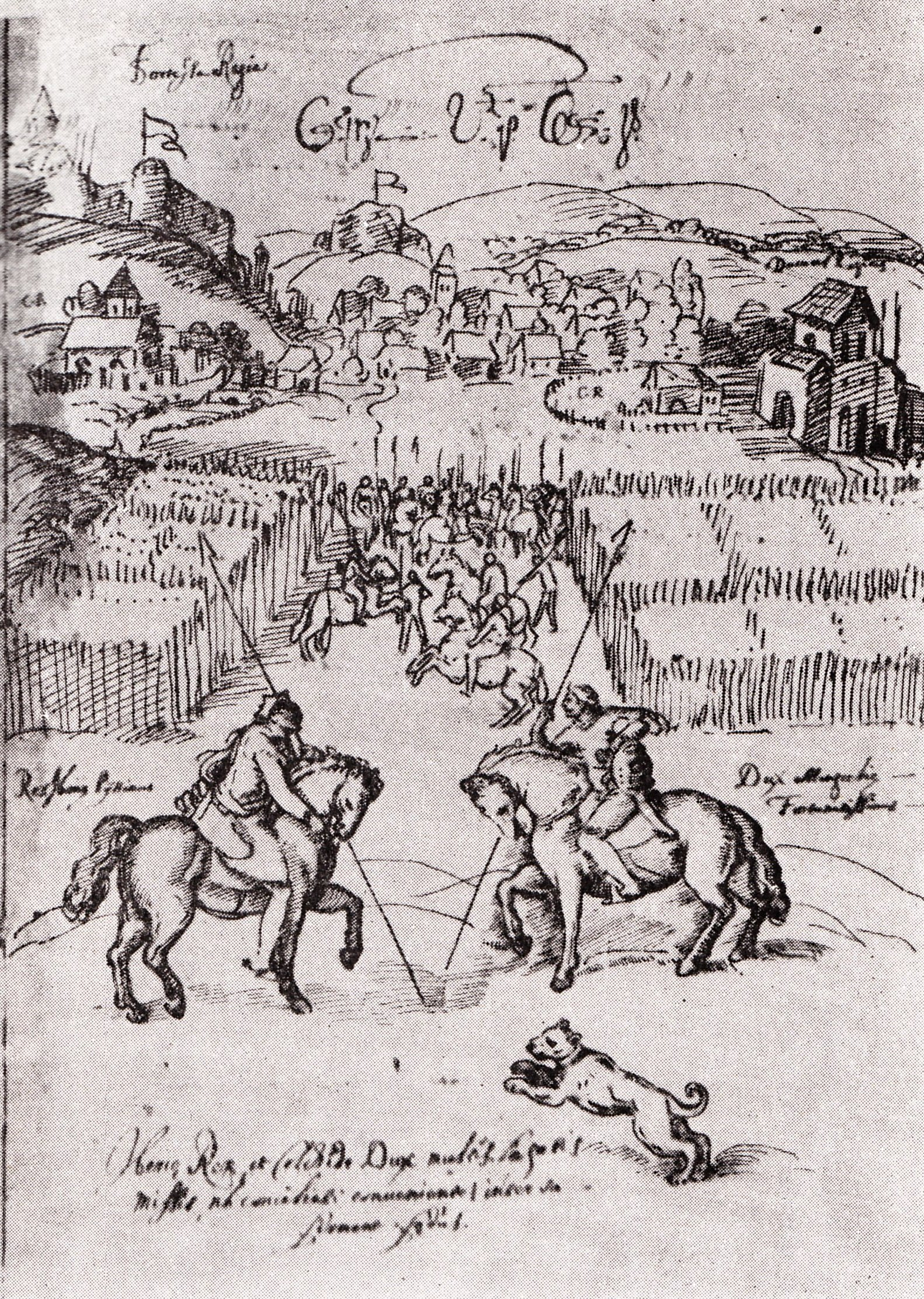
Scene from the western Georgian civil war.

Since 1623, a destructive conflict had been waged between the Kingdom of Imereti and the Principality of Mingrelia in western Georgia, with King Rostom providing logistical support to the Mingrelians. In 1658, following the reversal of fortunes in the war and the emergence of a new strategic advantage for Imereti after the death of Levan II of Mingrelia, Rostom appointed Vakhtang as general, charging him with leading a military expedition into Imereti. Around the same time, the king fell ill, compelling Vakhtang to assume greater responsibility for the administration of Kartli.

Vakhtang was joined on this campaign by Zaal, Duke of Aragvi. Together, and with assistance from the forces of the Ottoman Eyalet of Childir, they confronted the army of King Alexander III of Imereti in a brief engagement. The battle ended in defeat for Vakhtang and Zaal, forcing them to retreat into the forests of Somaneti.

According to the testimony of the royal envoy Pharsadan, a strategic dispute then arose between Vakhtang and Zaal. Pharsadan had visited the military camp to obtain their signatures on a letter of submission to Shah Abbas II. During his visit, Vakhtang discussed state affairs with the envoy and argued that a military victory was still possible if Zaal’s troops remained at the front, while Zaal formally complained to the envoy about Vakhtang’s alleged recklessness in conducting the campaign.

The immediate withdrawal of the Aragvian forces forced Vakhtang to reconsider his strategy and withdraw to Kartli. Less than a year later, Imereti emerged victorious from the conflict. (Note: The death of Levan II Dadiani in 1658 allowed Imereti to regain control over Mingrelia. In 1659, Alexander III seized the principality and imposed Vameq III as prince of Mingrelia.)

=== Conflict with Zaal ===
In an attempt to prevent open conflict with the Georgian nobility, Vakhtang sought to forge alliances with two powerful lords—Zaal, Duke of Aragvi and Nodar Tsitsishvili. To strengthen these ties, he arranged the marriage of his eldest daughter to Zurab, the son of Zaal, and orchestrated the union between Tsitsishvili’s daughter and his own son Archil. However, these marriages failed to ease tensions between the nobles and the heir apparent. Zaal subsequently persuaded several lords of Kakheti to oppose Vakhtang when the aged King Rostom’s health began to decline. Royal adviser Parsadan Gorgijanidze, Baindur Tumanishvili, and the Persian delegate Mohamed Zemena were tasked with mediating between the two factions, but their negotiations proved fruitless.

Parsadan later recalled an exchange of letters between Vakhtang and the Duke of Aragvi:

Vakhtang: “From the beginning, you coveted my principality; now tell me, what wrong have I done to you that you should be so ill-disposed toward me? I gave my daughter to your son and am willing to grant you whatever domain you choose.”
Zaal of Aragvi: “When we chose him as our master, and he gave his daughter to my son Zurab while asking for Nodar’s daughter for his son Archil, he made an enemy between us. But Thurman and the one from Tiflis still live. We awarded him the kingship of Kartli, and Kakheti was reserved for me. Moreover, I have sworn many times that after King Rostom I will no longer submit to the ruler of Kartli. If that suits you, so be it; if not, that is another matter.”

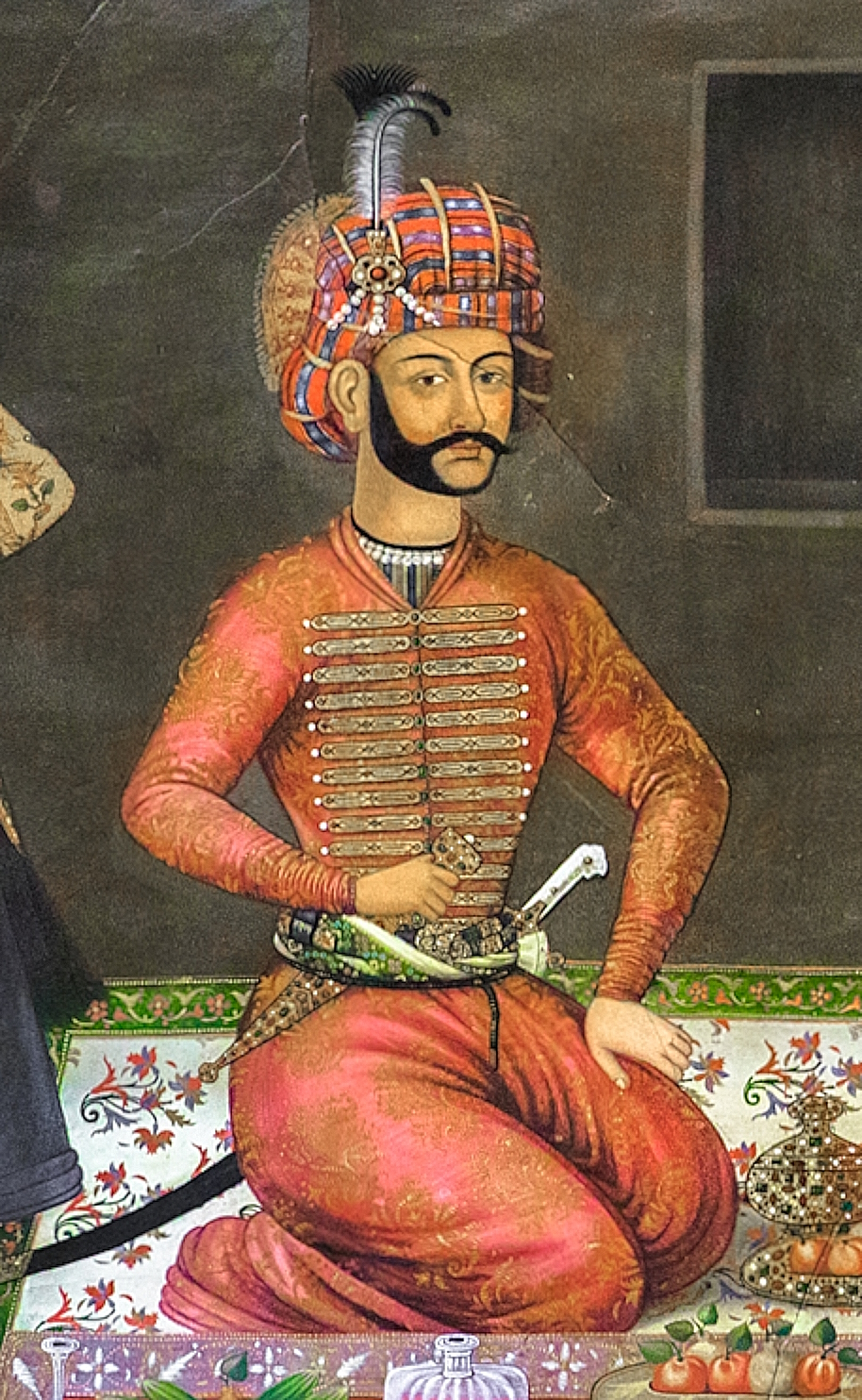
It was Abbas II who ruled Persia during Vakhtang's ascension.

On his deathbed, Rostom proposed a compromise. He granted his adopted son the royal title and sovereignty over Kartli, while dividing Kakheti between Persian control and the territories of Ertso and Tianeti, which were allotted to Zaal of Aragvi. This arrangement, however, did not end the rivalry, and rumors soon circulated regarding Rostom’s impending death.

To assess the situation, Shah Abbas II dispatched the diplomat Mahmoud Beg to Georgia. Upon his return to Persia, Mahmoud reported the growing unrest in the region, much to the surprise of the Isfahan court, which had believed that Vakhtang and Zaal maintained a cordial relationship.

As Rostom’s condition worsened, Vakhtang sent a dispatch to Persia requesting the Shah’s involvement in the royal succession. Before any decision could be made, King Rostom died on 17 November 1658 at the age of ninety-one. The Persian delegation invited by Vakhtang arrived shortly after his death and secured the treasures of both Rostom and Queen Mariam within the citadel of Tbilisi before Vakhtang’s return from his travels.

=== Accession to the Throne ===
Although Rostom’s death theoretically secured Vakhtang’s succession to the throne of Kartli, the envoy of Shah Abbas II did not immediately recognize him as monarch, referring to him at first only as the interim administrator of the kingdom. This hesitation likely stemmed from the continued influence of Zaal, Duke of Aragvi, who posed a serious political and military threat. Zaal attempted to have himself proclaimed king by marching on Avlabari, just outside Tbilisi, but upon witnessing the strength of the central forces loyal to Vakhtang, he retreated to his estates in Dusheti, refusing to submit to the new ruler.

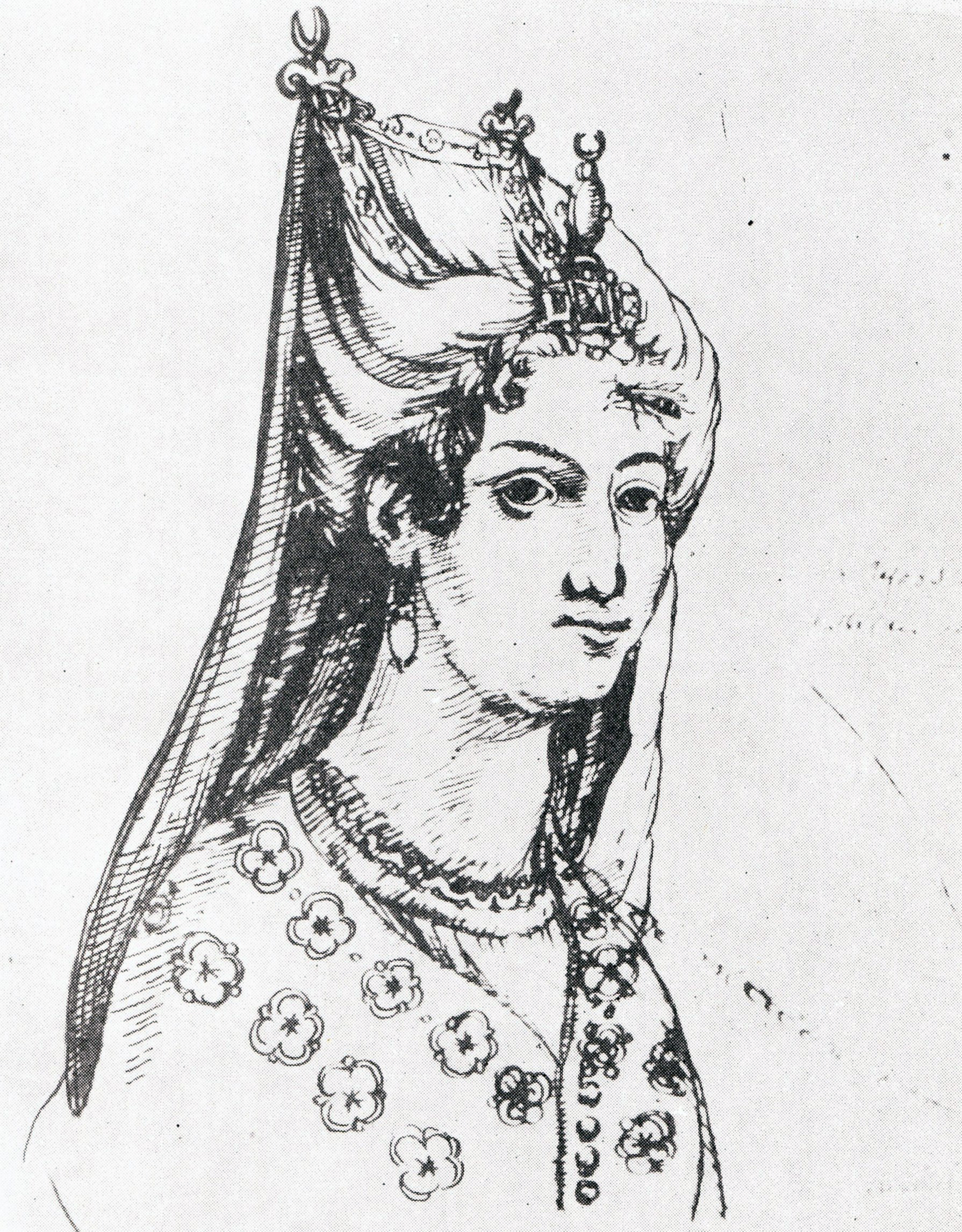
Portrait of Queen Mariam Dadiani.

On 1 January 1659, Persia officially recognized Vakhtang as the legitimate monarch of Kartli, authorizing his coronation in Mtskheta according to ancient Georgian Orthodox tradition. For the ceremony, he received from the Shah a royal crown, a jeweled aigrette, a diamond-encrusted sword, a horse, and various other insignia of power. He then assumed the titles Shahnavaz Khan and Vakhtang V, being styled as “King of Kings, Lord, Possessor, and Sovereign of the Abkhazians, Kartvelians, Ranians, Kakhetians, and Armenians, Shirvanshah and Shahanshah to the limits of the East and the North”.

The fate of Mariam Dadiani, Dowager Queen of Kartli and widow of Rostom, initially remained uncertain. Fearing deportation to Iran to join the Shah’s harem, she sent him a lock of her white hair to demonstrate her advanced age and appeared frequently in public to emphasize it. Shah Abbas II, moved by this gesture, ordered Vakhtang V to marry her so that she could remain in Georgia. At the time, Vakhtang was married to his first wife, Rodam Qaplanishvili, described in contemporary accounts as a woman of “rare beauty.” He was forced either to divorce her or, according to some sources, to demote her to the status of secondary consort in accordance with Persian custom, in order to marry Mariam. Despite Vakhtang’s initial opposition, he ultimately consented under pressure from the Persian delegates.

As a formality, Vakhtang sent an emissary to Levan II Dadiani, Mariam’s brother, to seek his approval for the union. Levan presented Mariam with a golden throne and precious stones as wedding gifts. The marriage took place in mid-February 1659 during a week-long ceremony. Following the celebrations, the queen sent one of her ladies as a gift to Simon II Gurieli, former Prince of Guria and her first husband, and four others to Shah Abbas II as a gesture of gratitude for allowing her to remain in Georgia. Mariam maintained cordial relations with Simon II Gurieli until his death in 1672, a connection said to have provoked Vakhtang V’s jealousy.

== Early Reign ==
=== Vassal of Persia ===
As with his adoptive father, Vakhtang V’s status as an independent monarch remains a matter of debate. In Georgia, he was crowned according to the traditional Georgian Orthodox rite and continued to be styled as Vakhtang V, King of Kartli, maintaining this title for his Christian subjects—an autonomy that was typically unacceptable to the Persian court at Isfahan. Contemporary Persian documents, however, refer to him as Shah Navaz Khan, the Wali of Gurjistan (“Governor of Georgia”), identifying him as a provincial governor within the Safavid Empire rather than as a fully sovereign ruler. Over a century later, King George XII would unsuccessfully invoke this confederal model—a monarchy within an imperial framework—as a precedent for Georgia’s possible integration into the Russian Empire.

According to Prince Vakhushti of Kartli, Vakhtang was a vassal who governed “well” in accordance with Safavid interests. He rapidly became one of the most influential political figures in Persia. Historian Kalistrat Salia describes Vakhtang V as the third most powerful man in the empire, following only the Shah and his vizier. This prominence allowed the Georgian elite to gain significant influence at the Persian court, marking the beginning of a period of Georgian ascendancy in Isfahan under the Bagrationi-Mukhrani dynasty. (Note: Under the Bagrationi dynasty of Mukhrani, many Georgians who converted to Islam became military leaders, obtained numerous political positions throughout the empire (including the governorship of Afghanistan) and greatly influenced Persian culture.) Members of the royal family joined the ranks of the imperial nobility. A convert to Shia Islam, Vakhtang V and his court often participated in the religious intrigues and ceremonial life of Isfahan.

Despite this privileged relationship, eastern Georgia remained under strict Persian supervision. As early as 1659, Shah Abbas II appointed Murtuz Ali Khan as governor of Kakheti, while the Persian-Georgian general Allahverdi Khan was tasked with settling 15,000 (or, according to some sources, 1,500) Azerbaijani families in the region and constructing three Persian military garrisons. At the same time, Persian authorities in South Caucasus relocated around 50,000 Muslim families from Azerbaijan and Karabakh into Kartli. Vakhtang V’s kingdom was divided into six administrative districts—four under the supervision of Morteza Quli Khan, the beylerbey of Karabakh, and two under Ali Quli Khan Kangarlu, governor of Nakhichevan. These officials exercised direct authority over the local Muslim settlers, but this system provoked growing tensions between Christian and Muslim communities, sometimes escalating into violence. Ali Quli Khan Kangarlu himself led a punitive expedition against the Christian Tushetians within Vakhtang’s territories.

Although Vakhtang retained his royal right to appoint successors to noble families, each such decision required prior approval from Persian authorities. The Safavid court also intervened to preserve domestic stability, as shown by Shah Abbas II’s appointment of the diplomat Safiqoli Khan to mediate peace between Vakhtang and Zaal of Aragvi—negotiations that resulted in a temporary truce following Zaal’s visit to the court at Isfahan. In 1660, Vakhtang was further compelled to send his young daughter Anuka to Persia, where she married Shah Abbas II.

=== Bakhtrioni Uprising ===
The intense Islamization of Kakheti continued to accelerate when the Safavid governors of South Caucasus initiated a large-scale colonization program, resettling approximately 95,000 Turcoman families throughout eastern Georgia. This demographic shift led to growing tensions between Christian Georgians and Muslim Turcomans, culminating in the 1659 assault of a Georgian priest by a group of Turcoman marauders. At the same time, the Iranian authorities seized control of Alaverdi and Bakhtrioni, garrisoning them with Turcoman troops whose presence encouraged frequent raids by the Lezgins of North Caucasus against Georgian communities in eastern Kakheti.

A large-scale insurrection soon broke out, organized by an alliance of the mountain tribes of Kakheti. The rebellion was led by Zaal of Aragvi, formerly an enemy of Vakhtang V and, until then, a loyal supporter of Persia. He was joined by Shalva, Duke of Ksani and Bidzina Cholokashvili, a close ally of the former King Teimuraz I of Kakheti. Together, the rebels captured Bakhtrioni and Alaverdi, annihilating the Turcoman garrisons during the summer of 1660. The crushing Muslim defeat forced Safavid to replace the governor of Kakheti, Selim Khan, with Murtuz Ali Khan, who was tasked both with suppressing the rebellion and temporarily halting the controversial colonization of Georgian territories.

Upon Murtuz Ali Khan’s arrival with a large Azerbaijani army, the insurgents ceased their advance. Although the new governor regained control over much of Kakheti, he failed to capture Zaal of Aragvi, prompting Vakhtang V to take charge of suppressing the revolt. On Sunday, 13 May 1661, Vakhtang, accompanied by Otar Sidamoni (Zaal’s nephew and a relative of Vakhtang V), met with Zaal at Dusheti under the pretense of negotiating peace. During the meeting, however, Otar assassinated Zaal, effectively ending the conflict between the rebellious nobleman and the Georgian monarch.

Zaal’s sons fled toward Samtskhe in an attempt to reach the Ottoman Empire, but they were intercepted by royal forces near Lake Tbis Quri in Javakheti and sent as hostages to the Shah’s court. Fearing retribution from Vakhtang V, Bidzina Cholokashvili and the Kvenipneveli brothers sought clemency from Murtuz Ali Khan, who instead imprisoned them and sent them to Abbas II, who ordered their execution. Vakhtang V submitted a detailed report on the rebellion and his actions to the Shah, and the remaining nephews of Zaal (excluding Otar and his two brothers) were executed by royal order.

Following his victory, Vakhtang V’s power was firmly consolidated. With Isfahan’s authorization, he annexed northern Kakheti into his domains, as Persia sought to maintain Kakheti under the rule of a pro-Persian governor. Vakhtang appointed Otar Sidamoni as the new Duke of Aragvi, while the Duchy of Ksani was granted to Jesse Kvenipneveli, who had remained neutral during the uprising. Otar’s brothers were also promoted — Edicher Sidamoni became the Chief Judge of the Kingdom, and Jason Sidamoni was appointed Master of the Queen’s Household.

Vakhtang V used the aftermath of the crisis to strengthen his authority. He secured from Persia the right to depose any noble who refused his rule and, through centralization of power, established an autocratic monarchy for the first time since the fragmentation of the Kingdom of Georgia in the 15th century.

== Conquest of Western Georgia ==
=== Alliance and Conflict with Mingrelia ===
Since his military campaign in Western Georgia as a general in 1658, Vakhtang had turned his ambitions toward the Kingdom of Imereti, a Georgian state ruled by a cadet branch of the Bagrationi dynasty, under Ottoman suzerainty and torn by severe internal conflict since the 1620s. Upon ascending to the throne, Vakhtang acted on these ambitions, preparing an invasion plan for Imereti. In March 1660, King Alexander III of Imereti died and was succeeded by Bagrat IV, widely regarded by the local nobility as incompetent. Vakhtang mobilized his forces and positioned them in the frontier village of Phtsa in preparation for a military expedition, but was forced to abandon the campaign following the outbreak of the Bakhtrioni uprising.

In September 1660, the Dowager Queen Darejan of Imereti organized a coup d’état against her stepson Bagrat IV, who was blinded and deposed in favor of her lover, Vakhtang Tchutchunashvili. The Ottoman Eyalet of Childir, which supported Darejan, sought to place her father, the former King Teimuraz I, on the throne of Imereti, but he refused the offer. The nobility of Kartli then urged Vakhtang V to revive his invasion plans and seize Imereti.

In the autumn of 1660, Vakhtang crossed the Likhi Range with an army of approximately 110,000 men and was immediately welcomed by the noble Tsereteli family, who recognized him as their suzerain. Proceeding to Sazano, he received the allegiance of the Imeretian nobility. Vameq III Dadiani, Prince of Mingrelia, broke his alliance with Imereti following the coup and joined forces with Vakhtang V. After negotiations mediated by Catholicos Domentius III of Georgia, Vakhtang and Vameq divided Imereti between them: Vakhtang annexed all territories east of the Bodja River, including the prosperous province of Argveti.

Vameq III, in turn, took control of the lands west of the Bodja River and strengthened his alliance by offering his only daughter in marriage to the royal prince Archil, Vakhtang’s eldest son. Vakhtang then returned to Tbilisi to address matters on the Kakhetian front. During his absence, however, Vameq III—acting on the advice of the Bishop of Tsageri—betrayed the alliance: he annulled his daughter’s engagement to Prince Archil and married her instead to the minor noble Bezhan Gogoberidze. He then seized Argveti and launched an attack on Kutaisi. The Dowager Queen Darejan, defeated and seeking aid, offered the throne of Imereti and the hand of her niece Ketevan to Prince Archil, but her forces were crushed, and Vameq Dadiani proclaimed himself King of Imereti. This occurred despite the arrival of 300 musketeers from Tbilisi under the command of Domentius III.

Vakhtang soon returned to Imereti, this time with a smaller contingent of Kartlian and Kakhetian nobles, and positioned his forces at the frontier outpost of Ali. Dadiani, accompanied by his Mingrelian guard and the remaining Imeretian troops, moved northward and awaited the royal army at Sachkhere. However, several prominent nobles of northern Imereti — including Paata Abashidze, Papuna of Racha, and Khosia Latchkhichvili of Lechkhumi — refused to aid him and defected to Vakhtang’s side, forcing Vameq to retreat to Kutaisi. In Argveti, Vakhtang once again received the submission of the Imeretian nobility, while Queen Mariam, a cousin of Vameq Dadiani, reproached the Bishop of Tsageri for his misguided counsel. Bezhan Gogoberidze, Vameq’s new son-in-law, also submitted to Vakhtang but was nevertheless executed on the king’s orders.

From Kutaisi, Vameq dispatched a spy to observe Vakhtang’s army. Identifying weaknesses in the royal forces, he planned a counterattack but was compelled to abandon it after the defection of the Mikeladze and Chiladze families, as well as the Bishop of Chqondidi. Retreating once more to Kutaisi, Vameq ordered the destruction of the city’s main bridge, leaving his vizier as governor before fleeing to Abkhazia to seek assistance from Prince Solomon II Sharvashidze. He was soon joined by reinforcements of Svans, Ossetians, and Dvals, initiating a renewed invasion of Western Georgia. Meanwhile, Khosia of Lechkhumi captured the Bishop of Tsageri, whom Vakhtang imprisoned in Armenia.

=== Capture of Kutaisi ===
The retreat of Vameq opened the way for Vakhtang to launch his invasion in 1661. He quickly captured the villages of Sachkhere, Sveri, and Katskhi before laying siege to the fortress of Skanda, located east of Kutaisi. The citadel was then occupied by Teimuraz, the former King of Kakheti, who had resided there since his return from Russia in 1659. The siege was brief: despite being advised to flee and seek refuge with Otar of Aragvi to avoid a potential Persian invasion, Teimuraz refused to leave and eventually surrendered to Givi Amilakhvari, Vakhtang’s chief adviser. Vakhtang then sent Revaz Sidamoni as his envoy to Shah Abbas II to determine the fate of the former monarch, who was subsequently imprisoned in Tbilisi before being transferred to Isfahan.

After the fall of Skanda, Vakhtang marched on Kutaisi and laid siege to the city. A brief confrontation with the Mingrelian guard ended in a decisive royal victory. With the Imeretian capital captured and Vameq in flight, Vakhtang became the first Georgian monarch to control the capitals of Kakheti, Kartli, and Imereti since George VIII in the 15th century. Without reinforcements, the remaining Imeretian fortresses quickly surrendered to Vakhtang. He stationed Kartlian garrisons throughout the region and, in Kutaisi, captured Darejan, Vakhtang Tchutchunashvili, and the deposed Bagrat IV, imprisoning them in the fortress of Boboti in Mingrelia.

With Imereti under his control, Vakhtang V continued his campaign into Mingrelia to punish Vameq. At Maghlaki, he received the submission of Otia Mikeladze before advancing toward Khoni, where the local lord, Jolia Deismani, joined his military expedition.

=== Conquest of Mingrelia ===
Lacking sufficient funds to pay for military assistance from Abkhazia, Vameq Dadiani fortified himself in Zugdidi in preparation for Vakhtang’s invasion, entrusting his wife and daughter to the noble Rostom Apakidze. Shortly after the capture of Kutaisi, Vakhtang launched his campaign and advanced rapidly with Kartlian and Imeretian troops toward Bandza, near the Mingrelian frontier. There, Apakidze betrayed his lord and surrendered Vameq’s wife and daughter to Vakhtang V.

After taking Bandza, Vakhtang proceeded to Tsakuji, where the former Dowager Queen Darejan was being held prisoner. Following a brief siege, he captured the fortress, released Darejan in exchange for the loyalty of the nobles who still supported her, and paid his troops with the treasury seized from the citadel. Leaving Darejan in charge of Tsakuji, he marched on Zugdidi, only to find the city deserted, as Vameq had fled to avoid capture. Vakhtang easily occupied the Mingrelian capital and then took the final anti-Kartlian stronghold, the fortress of Rukhi.

In Zugdidi, the monarch proclaimed Shamadavle Dadiani, the nephew of Queen Mariam and a refugee at the royal court of Tbilisi since Vameq III’s rise to power in 1658, as the new Prince of Mingrelia, crowning him Levan III Dadiani, his vassal, and appointing the noble Jolia Deismani as his vizier. The coronation was attended by Prince Solomon II of Abkhazia, who presented gifts and pledged allegiance to the throne of Kartli, and by Demetrius Gurieli, Prince of Guria. In consultation with Queen Mariam, Vakhtang arranged the marriage of his niece Tamar, daughter of his brother Constantine, to Levan III, the new prince of Mingrelia, thereby consolidating his control over the principality.

Departing from Zugdidi, Vakhtang advanced to besiege Chakviti, where Vameq’s children had refused to surrender. After capturing the town, he imprisoned the family of the deposed prince and seized his treasures, including the Icon of Okona, a Byzantine image brought to Georgia in the 11th century and to Mingrelia in the 16th century.

Vameq himself took refuge in the mountainous province of Svaneti, an area difficult for royal forces to access. A group of armed Svans, led by Khosia of Lechkhumi, eventually located and assassinated him. Khosia also captured the Bishop of Chqondidi, a loyal supporter of Vameq, and delivered him to Vakhtang, who imprisoned him in Cholaveri, a fortress south of Tbilisi.

=== Vakhtang, Suzeraint of All Georgia ===
Before consolidating his control over western Georgia, Vakhtang faced one final rebellion at Tsakuji, where Darejan attempted, unsuccessfully, to reconquer Imereti. She was swiftly defeated and temporarily imprisoned in the local citadel along with her husband, Vakhtang Tchutchunashvili, and the former king, Bagrat IV the Blind. Vakhtang then left Tsakuji for Kutaisi, where he was joined by Queen Mariam.

In the western Georgian capital, Vakhtang received Demetrius Gurieli, ruler of a powerful principality on the Black Sea, who offered valuable gifts and acknowledged Vakhtang as his suzerain. Following an agreement between the king and the prince, Vakhtang V, together with Queen Mariam, proclaimed his fourteen-year-old son Archil II as King of Imereti. Vakhtang crowned the young monarch, appointed Khosia of Lechkhumi as Archil II’s chief adviser, and tasked his trusted noble Givi Amilakhvari with strengthening the new king’s authority.

At this point, Vakhtang V had become the de facto ruler of all Georgia. King of Kartli since 1658, he extended his power over Kakheti after the defeat of the rebels at Bakhtrioni in 1661, secured Imereti under the nominal rule of his minor son, controlled Mingrelia through his protégé Levan III, and received the allegiance of the princes of Abkhazia and Guria in 1661. These early successes made Shah Navaz Khan (Vakhtang’s Persian title) the first monarch since the Georgian Triumvirate War of the 15th century to hold authority over nearly all Georgian lands, with the exception of the Eyalet of Childir. On the religious front, while the Georgian Orthodox Church remained divided between the Catholicate of Abkhazia and that of Kartli, contemporary documents indicate that under Vakhtang’s rule, the right to appoint a new catholicos of Abkhazia passed to the Prince of Mingrelia, thereby diminishing the institutional power of the King of Imereti.

After this brief yet remarkable campaign, Vakhtang returned to Tbilisi. On his journey, he met Queen Mariam in Gori and entrusted her with the custody of Elene, widow of Vameq III of Mingrelia, and her daughter Darejan. From the capital, the king sent a final report of his campaign to Shah Abbas II, who received it at the Persian village of Baghi-Mulk through the ambassadors Revan and Jesse Sidamoni. Upon learning of the capture of the former King Teimuraz I, the shah showed clemency, granting Vakhtang a large sum to fund Teimuraz’s transfer to Isfahan, under the supervision of Givi Amilakhvari and accompanied by Mingrelian prisoners of war taken as slaves.

The fate of the former rulers of Imereti remains somewhat uncertain. Prince Vakhushti, Vakhtang’s great-grandson, wrote that Bagrat IV, Vakhtang Tchutchunashvili, and Darejan were imprisoned together in Gori until the dowager queen and Tchutchunashvili escaped in 1668. Parsadan, a contemporary of Vakhtang, reports that Tchutchunashvili was blinded on royal orders and fled with Darejan to Ottoman territory, where they remained until their return to power in 1668, while Bagrat remained a prisoner in Tbilisi until 1663. One of Vameq Dadiani’s sons was also imprisoned in Tbilisi before seeking refuge in Russia, where he founded the Russian branch of the Dadiani family, which lasted until 1829.

== Later reign ==
=== Georgia Between the Ottomans and the Safavids ===
The Treaty of Zuhab, signed in 1639 between the Ottoman Empire and Safavid Iran, established the borders between the two empires, particularly in the Caucasus, where the Likhi Range divided their respective spheres of influence in Georgia. As a result, Western Georgia came under Ottoman control, while Safavids maintained authority over Kartli and Kakheti. Consequently, the conquest of Imereti by Vakhtang V, regarded internationally as a Safavid governor, and the subsequent coronation of his son Archil II as king in Imereti— nominally under Ottoman rule—sparked a diplomatic conflict between the two Muslim empires.

The Ottoman Pasha of Childir, stationed on the Georgian frontier, was the first to take note of the Georgian king’s violation and called upon Sultan Mehmed IV to respond, accusing Shah Abbas II of breaching the 1639 treaty. Fearing open war, Ottoman authorities in Childir and Erzurum temporarily evacuated their regions. Vakhtang, seeking to maintain his territorial gains, presented to the Shah the broad support of the Imeretian and Mingrelian nobility for the existing status quo. Nevertheless, he faced strong opposition at the Persian court, particularly from Najafqoli Khan, the Beylerbey of Yerevan. Archil, for his part, offered to pay tribute to the Ottoman Sultan—a proposal that Istanbul rejected outright.

In 1663, Persia yielded to Ottoman demands and ordered Vakhtang to depose Archil, who had reigned for less than two years. The Persian diplomat Amir Hamza Khan Thalich was dispatched to Imereti to oversee the withdrawal of Vakhtang’s troops and to ensure that Archil and his advisors left Kutaisi. This created a succession crisis: Demetrius of Guria seized the opportunity to proclaim himself king, prompting the Imeretian nobility to call for the restoration of their legitimate ruler, Bagrat IV the Blind. To prevent unrest, Vakhtang agreed, drafting an oath of allegiance binding Kutaisi and the Imeretian aristocracy to Tbilisi. However, he reversed his decision after advisers warned that Bagrat V would likely become a mere Ottoman client. Eventually, a compromise was reached among Tbilisi, Childir, and the Imeretian nobles: Bagrat IV was reinstated, married Tatia, Vakhtang’s niece, accepted the Kartlian noble Tarkhanashvili as his chief counselor, and pledged loyalty to Tbilisi in domestic affairs. Tarkhanashvili, however, died under mysterious circumstances in Imereti later that same year.

Also in 1663, Prince Nicholas Bagrationi, grandson of King Teimuraz I and then living in exile in Russia, declined a Persian offer to return to Georgia, convert to Islam, and rule as a vassal king of Kakheti. His refusal allowed Abbas II to bestow the Kakhetian crown upon Archil, thereby restoring the kingdom that Persia had abolished in 1648. Like his father, Archil traveled to Persia, converted to Islam, and assumed the name Shah Nazar Khan. On his return journey, he was met by Vakhtang at the Persian border, and the two entered Tbilisi together in a grand procession celebrated by the Kartlian and Kakhetian nobility. In 1664, Vakhtang crowned his son at Mtskheta as King of Kakheti, after which the two rulers parted ways.

Vakhtang and Archil jointly pursued a policy of centralizing royal authority, but their ambitions were curtailed when Safavid Persia grew wary of Vakhtang’s increasing power. Ironically, part of the Kakhetian nobility opposed Archil, viewing him as a Persian appointee lacking legitimacy. In 1665, Otar of Aragvi threatened rebellion, forcing Vakhtang to intervene, as he had personally appointed Otar duke and feared Persian interference. Vakhtang proposed a compromise granting the Duchy of Aragvi greater autonomy, but Archil rejected the plan, unwilling to weaken his already limited authority—leading to tension between father and son. Ultimately, Vakhtang conceded to Archil’s demands and prepared for an invasion of Aragvi, prompting Otar to seek an audience with the Shah.

During Otar’s absence, Vakhtang and Archil invaded Aragvi, killed the regent Papo Sidamoni, and annexed the duchy into the Kingdom of Kakheti. The Shah later required Vakhtang to return the confiscated wealth to the duke but permitted the annexation to stand, suggesting that Vakhtang retained considerable support within Abbas II's court.

=== War Against Heraclius ===
The death of Teimuraz in 1663 at Astrabad altered the political situation in the region. His grandson, Prince Nicholas, then exiled in Russia, became the legitimate heir to the Kakhetian crown, prompting Kartli to act swiftly to calm the Christian nobility. Vakhtang organized an elaborate funeral for the late king, officiated by Catholicos Domentius III and attended by all the bishops of Kartli and Kakheti. Confident in his popularity, Nicholas nevertheless landed in Tusheti, a mountainous region beyond Kartli’s effective control. From there, he launched several raids against royal positions, leading Persia to order the south Caucasian khanates to assist Vakhtang.

A battle between the two sides took place in 1663 at Uriath-Ubani, where the royal forces were led by Vakhtang’s nephews Datuna and Paata of Mukhrani, along with Duke Otar of Aragvi. Nicholas, who adopted the name Heraclius, was quickly defeated and fled to the fortress of Torgha, the residence of his mother, Helena. Vakhtang laid siege to the fortress but allowed mother and son to flee to Tusheti following Helena’s pleas. Having subdued all of Kakheti, Vakhtang returned to Tbilisi.

In 1664, (Note: Marie-Félicité Brosset doubts the veracity of this second invasion attempt by Heraclius. According to him, Péchangue confuses it with the third invasion of 1665, even though Péchangue was a contemporary of Vakhtang V and his official biographer.) before Archil’s return from Persia, Heraclius assembled a new militia of Tushetians and captured the fortress of Burjal. Vakhtang V then marched at the head of a large army reinforced by Otar of Aragvi and his brother Bagrat Sidamoni, the state minister Edicher, Kakhetian troops from Martkopi and Ujarma, and the South Caucasian khans. The two forces met at Kiziki. Heraclius was again defeated and forced to retreat to Russia. Vakhtang returned to Tbilisi and sent Shah Abbas II one hundred camels loaded with the severed heads of the defeated.

Archil’s accession to the throne in 1664 was expected to restore stability, but part of the nobility still hesitated to acknowledge Kartli's authority and demanded that Archil marry a daughter of Heraclius to legitimize his rule—a proposal Vakhtang rejected, fearing it would anger the Shah. The king of Kartli frequently visited Kakheti, which he regarded as a vassal territory, and during one of these visits he met a Lezgin warlord who offered to assassinate Heraclius. The plan failed when a noble faction warned the prince in advance.

In 1665, (Note: Péchangue dates this battle to 1664.) Heraclius resumed his raids into Kakheti but was forced to withdraw to Tusheti when Vakhtang V positioned his troops at Atsqveri. The enemy’s retreat prompted the king to dismiss most of his forces, keeping only his most loyal nobles at Atsqveri. Learning of the reduction in royal troops, Heraclius returned under cover of night and launched a surprise attack on the royal encampment. During the battle, the prince mistook the royal tent for that of counselor Givi Amilakhvari, who fled with his contingent, followed by the forces of Satsitsiano and the sultanate of Baidar.

The Battle of Atsqveri proved especially bloody. Vakhtang and Archil personally slew many Tushetians and were saved by the royal servant Tamaz Turkistanishvili, who decapitated an enemy soldier moments before he could strike the king. At dawn, royal forces were reinforced by Governor Zaza Tsitsishvili and his troops from Sabaratiano, allowing Vakhtang and his son to escape on horseback. Tsitsishvili eventually defeated the invaders, while Heraclius once again fled to Tusheti. Vakhtang ordered the construction of a wall made from the severed heads of the fallen at Atsqveri and sent the victims’ skins to the Shah.

Victorious, Vakhtang V received authorization from Isfahan to reform the Kakhetian nobility, replacing every lord he deemed disloyal. In doing so, he strengthened Archil’s authority throughout Kakheti.

=== The Rebellion of Aragvi ===
Otar of Aragvi remained an unstable vassal of Vakhtang V. Despite having been appointed by Vakhtang after murdering his own uncle, whom he replaced, Otar secretly maintained loyalty to the former royal line of Kakheti. In 1661, he organized an unsuccessful plot to free Teimuraz from the besieged fortress of Skanda in Imereti, and in 1664 he hesitated to recognize King Archil. During Vakhtang’s invasion of Aragvi in 1664, Otar lost the territories of Ertso and Tianeti and was accused of treason, though he regained them after swearing allegiance to Archil.

To ease his tense relationship with Kartli, Otar appealed directly to the Shah, who compelled Vakhtang to grant him passage to Persia. In Isfahan, Otar succeeded in convincing Abbas II to recognize him as a direct vassal, an arrangement that allowed the Safavid court to curb the expanding authority of the King of Kartli. During Otar’s absence, however, Ioram Gochashvili, a distant cousin of the Bagrationi family, organized an attempted coup against Vakhtang V. Ioram was swiftly captured and blinded, but the king accused Otar of having instigated the unrest.

In retaliation for the rebellion, Vakhtang and Archil launched a military campaign against Aragvi. The state minister, Edicher Sidamoni—Otar’s brother—abandoned his position to defend his family’s estates. Vakhtang advanced into the province of Dusheti, while his son laid siege to Tianeti. Vakhtang captured Dusheti after defeating Papuna Sidamoni and subdued the entire Aragvi region, even threatening to execute the Sidamoni brothers. Only after the pleas of their family did Vakhtang relent, showing clemency and returning to Tbilisi.

Otar of Aragvi eventually returned to Georgia as a direct subject of the Shah, a status Vakhtang was forced to accept. However, in September 1666, Abbas II died and was succeeded by Shah Suleiman I, allowing the king to reverse his policy. That same year, Otar and Edicher both died in what the chronicler Parsadan Gorgijanidze described as a poisoning. (Note: Prince Vakhushti of Kartli mentions these deaths as divine punishment linked to the conversion of the two nobles to Islam.) Vakhtang then appointed Revaz Sidamoni, Otar’s uncle, as Duke of Aragvi, thereby restoring the province to Kartli's sphere of influence.

=== Fragile Harmony ===
Under Vakhtang’s protection, Kakheti experienced a period of prosperity. Archil transferred his capital from Gremi to Telavi, moving the regional center away from the North Caucasian threat and laying the foundation for Telavi’s emergence as a cultural hub of Georgia. In an effort to solidify his legitimacy, Archil requested his father’s permission to marry Ketevan, sister of Heraclius, former wife of Bagrat IV of Imereti, and then a prisoner at the court of the Ottoman governor of Childir. This was despite the fact that Vakhtang had already arranged Archil’s engagement to the daughter of the influential Prince Tsitsishvili. To break off the alliance, Archil spread rumors accusing his betrothed of an incestuous relationship with one of her cousins—a claim denied by her family—which led to a duel between Archil and the princess’s brother before Vakhtang’s intervention. In 1667, Vakhtang sent a merchant to Akhaltsikhe to purchase Ketevan’s freedom for 2,000 tomans and organized an elaborate wedding ceremony for the couple in Tbilisi.

Meanwhile, from Akhaltsikhe, Darejan of Imereti and Vakhtang Tchutchunashvili secured Ottoman support to overthrow Bagrat IV in 1668. Vakhtang V imprisoned Bagrat in Tbilisi but was compelled to restore him to the throne a few months later in 1669, after the Imeretian nobility rebelled and assassinated the usurping couple. Around the same period, Vakhtang strengthened ties with western Georgia by marrying his son Levan to the sister of Prince George III of Guria in a grand ceremony in Gori. He also forged strategic alliances with other noble families: his second son, George, married Tamar Davitishvili, while Luarsab wed Mariam, daughter of duke Revaz of Aragvi.

Relations between Kartli and Persia changed dramatically with the accession of Shah Suleiman I. The new monarch rejected Vakhtang V’s request to repatriate his daughter Anuka, the widow of Abbas II, and instead gave her the choice of remarriage—to either the grand vizier Shaykh Ali Khan Zanganeh or Shah Verdi Khan of Lorestan. Vakhtang ultimately favored Shah Verdi, thereby making an enemy of Zanganeh. The Persian government ordered the construction of a defensive wall around Tbilisi and stationed an Iranian garrison in the city. Vakhtang, however, suspected that the fortifications were intended to isolate him within his capital and reduce his authority. In response, he commissioned a new royal palace south of Tbilisi, on the banks of the Mtkvari River near the royal hippodrome, and thereafter visited the city only rarely—especially after surviving an assassination attempt by Persian soldiers during one of his visits.

== Last years and downfall ==
=== New tensions ===
Around 1670, the Dvalians, a Georgian tribe inhabiting present-day South Ossetia, rebelled and ceased paying tribute to Kartli. To suppress the uprising, Vakhtang V led an army to Krtskhilvani, preparing to invade the territories of the Dvalians and Ossetia itself. Fearing the king’s advance, the Dvalian tribal chiefs appeared before Vakhtang and swore to resume payment of their tribute.

In 1672, Vakhtang attempted to form a new alliance with Mingrelia, then engaged in conflict with Imereti, by proposing the marriage of Manuchar, son of Levan III Dadiani, to Darejan, daughter of Archil II, both children being only seven years old at the time. The alliance failed when a faction in Kutaisi spread the rumor that the King of Kartli intended to send Manuchar as a hostage to Persia, prompting his attendants to seize him and return him to his father.

During this period, General Zaza Tsitsishvili became one of the most powerful figures in the Kingdom of Kartli, exploiting the weakening of the lesser nobility to strengthen his own position. Summoned before the king, he was killed by Prince George, following a previous altercation that had resulted in the death of a royal servant. This incident marked the first serious division within the royal family, as Archil and Vakhtang expressed their discontent with George’s actions. Tsitsishvili was later replaced by Tamaz Qaplanishvili as commander of the Georgian armed forces.

By 1674, relations between Kartli and Persia deteriorated due to the intrigues of Shaykh Ali Khan Zanganeh, who persuaded Shah Suleiman I to allow Heraclius to return from Russia to Kakheti, intending to use him as leverage against Vakhtang V.

=== Intrigues ===
During the 1670s, Shaykh Ali Khan Zanganeh initiated a plot to sow division within the Georgian royal family and provoke instability across South Caucasus. He conspired with the Ottoman pasha of Childir, who established contact with Luarsab, son of Vakhtang V, convincing him to claim the throne of Imereti through his marriage to Mariam Sidamoni, niece of Duke Shoshita of Racha, one of the most powerful nobles in western Georgia. Luarsab launched a military campaign in 1672, but it failed quickly when Vakhtang refused to support him, wishing to avoid diplomatic conflict between Ottoman and Persia. Luarsab made another attempt to seize the Imeretian throne, but upon discovering Shaykh Ali Khan Zanganeh’s conspiracy, he fled Akhaltsikhe in 1674.

This situation not only created tension between father and son but also led to a serious rift between Luarsab and his elder brother Archil, the former king of Imereti. In 1675, Archil abdicated his throne of Kakheti, left his wife in the Kartlian fortress of Surami, and departed for Akhaltsikhe to launch his own invasion of western Georgia. However, Sultan Mehmed IV intervened to halt the plot of the governor of Childir, forbidding him from supporting Archil’s claims. Vakhtang strongly opposed his son’s actions and sent Catholicos Domentius III to urge him to wait until his father’s death before attempting to seize Imereti, hoping to avoid Persia’s wrath. When persuasion failed, Vakhtang reportedly sent rich gifts of gold and silver to the Ottoman government in a futile attempt to secure permission to occupy western Georgia.

Archil’s ambitions and Vakhtang’s inability to control his sons were viewed negatively by the Persian authorities. In 1675, the Bishop of Chqondidi escaped from imprisonment in Sholaveri and regained influence in Mingrelia. Following Archil’s abdication, Vakhtang was compelled to appoint Heraclius, his former rival, as king of Kakheti, although part of the Kakhetian nobility remained loyal to him. Revaz of Aragvi took advantage of the situation to restore his autonomy and seize the remaining Kakhetian territories belonging to the royal domains of Kakheti.

The conspiracy of Shaykh Ali Khan Zanganeh against the King of Kartli ultimately succeeded, as Persia turned openly against its former ally. In 1675, the Shah dispatched his envoy, Mustafa Quli Beg Qajar, to Tbilisi to summon Vakhtang to Isfahan.

=== Death ===
Officially, Vakhtang V was summoned to Isfahan to participate, as one of the most powerful governors of the Safavid Empire, in developing a new military strategy for Persia. However, it was widely understood that this summons served as punishment by the imperial court for the Imeretian affair and as a pretext to curtail his growing power. Vakhtang himself regarded the journey as an exile. On 25 June 1676, he departed Tbilisi, taking with him the entirety of the royal treasury, reportedly as a means of depriving his sons of its use. He appointed his second son, George (later George XI of Kartli), as regent, and his younger son, Levan, as governor of Shida Kartli, instructing them to subdue the rebellious Duke Jesse of Ksani. The latter was swiftly defeated and replaced by Datuna, Duke of Ksani.

Vakhtang’s journey to Persia is vividly described by the French traveler Jean Chardin, who accompanied him. According to Chardin, the king departed Georgia with much of his royal court, forming an extensive procession that traveled with great ceremony. Along the way, Vakhtang personally quelled a noble uprising and was received with honor by numerous Muslim governors across South Caucasus. Jesse of Ksani, expelled from his domains, also set out for Persia to seek an audience with the Shah; overtaking Vakhtang’s convoy near Qazvin, he reportedly offended the king by this act.

It was at Qazvin that Vakhtang fell ill, though he continued his journey despite his worsening condition. In September 1676, at Khoskaro, in the province of Ganja, he succumbed to his illness. His body was transported to Qom, near Tehran, where he was buried beside his adoptive father and predecessor, Rostom Khan.

Upon Vakhtang’s death, Shah Suleiman I pledged to preserve the royal court and offered the throne of Kartli to Heraclius, who already ruled Kakheti. However, Heraclius’s refusal to convert to Islam led Persia to revoke the offer. The Safavid court deposed him, placed Kakheti under Muslim governors, and granted control of Kartli to Prince George. During the audit of the late king’s wealth by Persian officials, Prince Alexander, one of Vakhtang’s sons and serving darugha of Isfahan, was appointed administrator of his father’s vast Persian estates.

Immediately after Vakhtang’s death, Archil was captured and imprisoned by the Ottoman governor of Childir, though he was later released following the intervention of Kartli.

== Family ==
Vakhtang was married twice. His first wife was Rodam (died 1691), a daughter of Prince Qaplan Baratashvili-Orbelishvili. Upon his accession to the throne of Kartli, he was compelled—at the insistence of the Shah of Iran—to divorce Rodam against his will and to marry Mariam Dadiani (d. 1682), the widow of his adoptive father, Rostom, in February 1659. All of Vakhtang’s children were born from his first marriage to Rodam. Their children were:

- An unnamed daughter, who married Zurab, son of Zaal, Duke of Aragvi, in 1655;
- Princess Ana (Anuka), who married first in 1660 Shah Abbas II and then, in 1668, Shah Verdi Khan of Luristan;
- Archil II (1647–1713), reigned multiple times as King of Imereti (r. 1661–1663, 1678–1679, 1690–1691, 1695–1696, 1698) and as King of Kakheti (r. 1664–1675);
- George XI (died 1709), King of Kartli (r. 1676–1688, 1703–1709);
- Prince Alexander (Iskander Mirza) (fl. 1666–1697), darugha (governor) of Isfahan; he married Mehr Sharaf Begom, a granddaughter of Simon II of Kartli and Jahan Banu Begum, herself a granddaughter of Shah Abbas I;
- Prince Levan (1652/56–1709), regent of Kartli in 1676–1677 and again in 1703–1704;
- Prince Luarsab (died 1698);
- Prince Solomon (Suleiman) (died 16 March 1703), who married Tamar, daughter of Shalva, Duke of Ksani; they had a son, Oman;
- Princess Tamar (died 1694), who married Prince Givi Amilakhvari (died 1700); she became a nun under the name Gaiane;
- An unnamed daughter, who married Soltan Hoseyn.

== Economic Renaissance ==
The principal legacy of Vakhtang V was the restoration of stability in eastern Georgia after centuries of warfare and devastation. Through his diplomacy with the North Caucasian tribes and the relocation of the Kakhetian capital to Telavi, Vakhtang brought lasting peace to Kakheti. Historian David Marshall Lang credits him with reviving both the commercial and agricultural economies of Kakheti and Kartli.

During his reign, Vakhtang introduced the first mercantile regulations to facilitate trade within Georgia. He established customs duties to control foreign commerce, protect domestic producers, and increase state revenue. He also prohibited the sale of Georgian slaves abroad. This policy contributed to population growth and the prosperity of several urban centers, including Gori, Surami, Ali, and Tskhinvali. Tbilisi itself developed into an international trading hub, described by Jean Chardin as a cosmopolitan city hosting Armenians, Greeks, Jews, Turks, Persians, Indians, Tatars, Russians, and Europeans. The city’s population surpassed 20,000 inhabitants, and several high-quality bazaars and caravanserais were constructed to accommodate foreign merchants.

While Kartli experienced economic growth, western Georgia suffered decline due to decades of civil conflict. Vakhtang’s broader economic strategy aimed to transform Georgia into a commercial bridge between Europe and Asia. He sought to establish a new trade route through Tbilisi to rival those of Baghdad–Aleppo and Tabriz–Erzurum, while also pursuing investment from Western merchants. Vakhtang welcomed numerous foreign trade delegations to Georgia, including that of Jean Chardin, representing the newly founded French East India Company, who visited the country in 1672–1673. Ultimately, Persian opposition prevented the signing of a formal agreement between the Kingdom of Kartli and the Company.

== Culture ==
Shah Navaz Khan had been a Muslim since at least 1653, (Note: His title as Bakhuta Beg during his tenure as prince of Mukhrani may indicate that he converted at a young age.) yet he did not allow his faith to dictate his cultural policy. Under his rule, the women of Tbilisi were required to wear the veil, but no religious conversions were imposed; pork and wine remained abundant throughout the kingdom—unlike in Persia—and the only mosque in the capital was located within the royal citadel. In practice, Vakhtang V used his authority to exert significant influence over the Georgian Orthodox Church. In 1660, he appointed his cousin Domentius III as Catholicos of Georgia, granting him the responsibility of safeguarding the Orthodox faith.

During Vakhtang’s reign, fourteen churches operated in Tbilisi, including eight Armenian ones. The Persian authorities repeatedly attempted to construct a public mosque in the city but faced widespread popular resistance. This defiant spirit allowed Georgia to maintain a notable degree of autonomy within the Persian Empire. In 1662, Bishop Joseph II of Tbilisi ascended to his seat, inaugurating an era of literary and poetic revival under his patronage. Joseph II himself composed an epic poem celebrating the life of Giorgi Saakadze.

Seeking closer ties with the West, Vakhtang opened a new chapter in relations between Georgia and the Catholic world. He launched a program in partnership with Rome, allowing the establishment of Catholic missions in Kartli to teach Greek, Italian, and Georgian throughout the kingdom. Vakhtang personally sponsored the education of twenty-five Georgian students in Rome each year. The Capuchin friars maintained close relations with Queen Mariam built a Catholic chapel in her garden. Italian and Spanish musicians and dancers frequently performed at the royal court, while the Italian physicians Epifalo and Rafaello di Parma served as the king’s personal doctors. Vakhtang invited numerous artists, missionaries, and scholars from Europe, rewarding them generously with wine and slaves.

A well-educated monarch himself, Vakhtang V actively promoted literature and the arts. Queen Mariam sponsored a new edition of the medieval chronicle The Life of Kartli. His son Archil introduced theatrical art to Georgia, composing a play that imagined a dialogue between Teimuraz of Kakheti and the medieval poet Shota Rustaveli. The royal court frequently hosted burlesque carnivals and military reenactments. Georgian poetry experienced a modest revival under Vakhtang’s rule, though most works of the period were considered of mediocre quality. The most notable example is the Shahnavaziani by the royal servant Pechangue Khitarishvili, a 5,000-verse poem of sixteen syllables recounting Vakhtang’s reign from 1658 to 1665, valued more for its historical narrative than its poetic merit. The text was later translated into French in 1858 by Marie-Félicité Brosset.

== Legacy ==
Contemporary chroniclers of Vakhtang V, including Pechangue and Parsadan Gorgijanidze, portray him as an exemplary ruler, primarily remembered for his greatest achievement—the reunification, albeit temporary, of Georgia. He is often depicted as a warrior king, unafraid to lead his armies into battle. Pechangue described him as “agile as a tiger, strong as a lion, radiant as the full moon; no bow was strong enough for his wrist; he feared neither lions nor combat, excelled at the game of mail, hunted fierce beasts, and sang at banquets to drive away sorrow”.

His great-grandson Vakhushti of Kartli dedicated a eulogy to him in the early 18th century:

“King Vakhtang was robust, energetic, handsome, experienced in warfare, fearless, a skilled archer and horseman in the hippodrome; a thinker as profound as he was eloquent and politically astute; generous, compassionate toward widows and orphans, moderate in anger, and known for his clemency. He was successful in his undertakings and deeply religious. He organized Kartli and Kakheti, held Imereti temporarily and extended his influence there from time to time, while Meskheti was subject to him. He restored and repopulated Kartli, Trialeti, Tashir, and Abotsi, which had been left desolate, promoted the Christian faith and the churches, and strove to rebuild all that had been destroyed by Rostom. In his time, people had grown ashamed to partake of the body and blood of Our Lord Jesus Christ, but with the help of Catholicos Domentius III, he revived the practice of confession and communion.”

Modern historians also hold Vakhtang V in high regard. Donald Rayfield describes him as a compassionate monarch, despite his occasional use of blinding as royal punishment and the beheading of rebellious Tushetian soldiers in 1665. W. E. D. Allen depicts Shah Nawaz Khan as a distinguished, intelligent, and cultured warrior—one of the greatest political figures of his era, not only in the Caucasus but across the Safavid Empire. The dynasty founded by Vakhtang represented a new political class: a line of monarchs whose intelligence and diplomacy replaced the erratic heroism of earlier Georgian kings.

David Marshall Lang considered Vakhtang one of the most capable rulers of the late Georgian monarchy, noting that his personal prestige earned him respect throughout the Middle East.

== Bibliography ==
- Toumanoff, Cyril (1990). Les dynasties de la Caucasie chrétienne de l'Antiquité jusqu'au XIXe siècle (in French). Rome: Tables généalogiques et chronologiques.
- Salia, Kalistrat (1980). Histoire de la nation géorgienne [History of the Georgian nation] (in French). Paris: Nino Salia.
- Asatiani, Nodar (2008). Საქართველოს ისტორია II [History of Georgia, Volume 2] (in Georgian). Tbilisi: Tbilisi University Press. ISBN 978-9941-13-004-5.
- Rayfield, Donald (2012). Edge of Empires, a History of Georgia. London: Reaktion Books. ISBN 978-1-78023-070-2.
- Allen, W.E.D. (1932). A History of the Georgian People. London: Routledge & Keagan Paul.
- Lang, David Marshall (1957). The Last Years of Georgian Monarchy. New York: Columbia University Press.
- Brosset, Marie-Félicité (1858). Histoire moderne de la Géorgie [Modern History of Georgia] (in French). Saint Petersburg: Imperial Academy of Sciences.
- Asatiani, Nodar; Janelidze, Otar (2009). History of Georgia. Tbilisi: Publishing House Petite. ISBN 978-9941-9063-6-7.
- Asatiani, Nodar; Bendianashvili, Alexandre (1997). Histoire de la Géorgie. Paris: L'Harmattan. ISBN 2-7384-6186-7.
- Péchangue (1858) [1665]. Shahnavaziani: A Verse History of King Shah Nawaz I. VIII (in Georgian). Translated by Marie-Félicité Brosset. Saint Petersburg: Imperial Academy of Sciences. p. 14.
- Floor, Willem (2001). Safavid Government Institutions. Costa Mesa, California: Mazda Publishers. pp. 1–311. ISBN 978-1568591353.
- Matthee, Rudi (2021). The Safavid World. New York: Taylor & Francis. ISBN 9781000392876. OCLC 1274244049.

Regnal titles
Preceded by Prince David of Kakheti	Prince of Mukhrani; 1629–1658	Succeeded by Constantine I
Preceded by Rostom	King of Kartli; 1658–1675	Succeeded by George XI
