= Battle of Bakhtrioni =

- Part of Kakhetian Uprising (1659)
Date	September 1659
Location	Bakhtrioni fortress
Result	Georgian victory

Belligerents
Kingdom of Kakheti	Safavid Iran

The Battle of Bakhtrioni (Georgian: ბახტრიონის ბრძოლა) was a notable episode of the Kakhetian Uprising (1659) against Iranian invaders. Official historiography contains relatively little information about the battle, while Georgian oral tradition preserves a rich body of material about it.

The rebels' attack on Bakhtrioni Fortress, where the main Qizilbash army was stationed, appears to have taken place at night, taking the enemy by surprise. At the same time, the rebels attacked the Qizilbash forces fortified within Alaverdi Monastery and decisively defeated the large garrisons of both strongholds. This effectively secured the success of the uprising. The mountain peoples of Kakheti, particularly the Tushetians, Pshavians, and Khevsurians, played a major role in the battle. Georgian folklore celebrates the mountain heroes who took part in the fighting, including the Tushetian Zezva Gaprindauli, the Khevsurian Nadira Khosharauli, and the Pshavian Gogolauri.

The battle was later commemorated by the Georgian poet Vazha-Pshavela in his poem Bakhtrioni.
