= Profitable house of A. D. Sidamon-Eristov =

Cultural heritage building in Moscow

- Доходный дом А. Д. Сидамона-Эристова
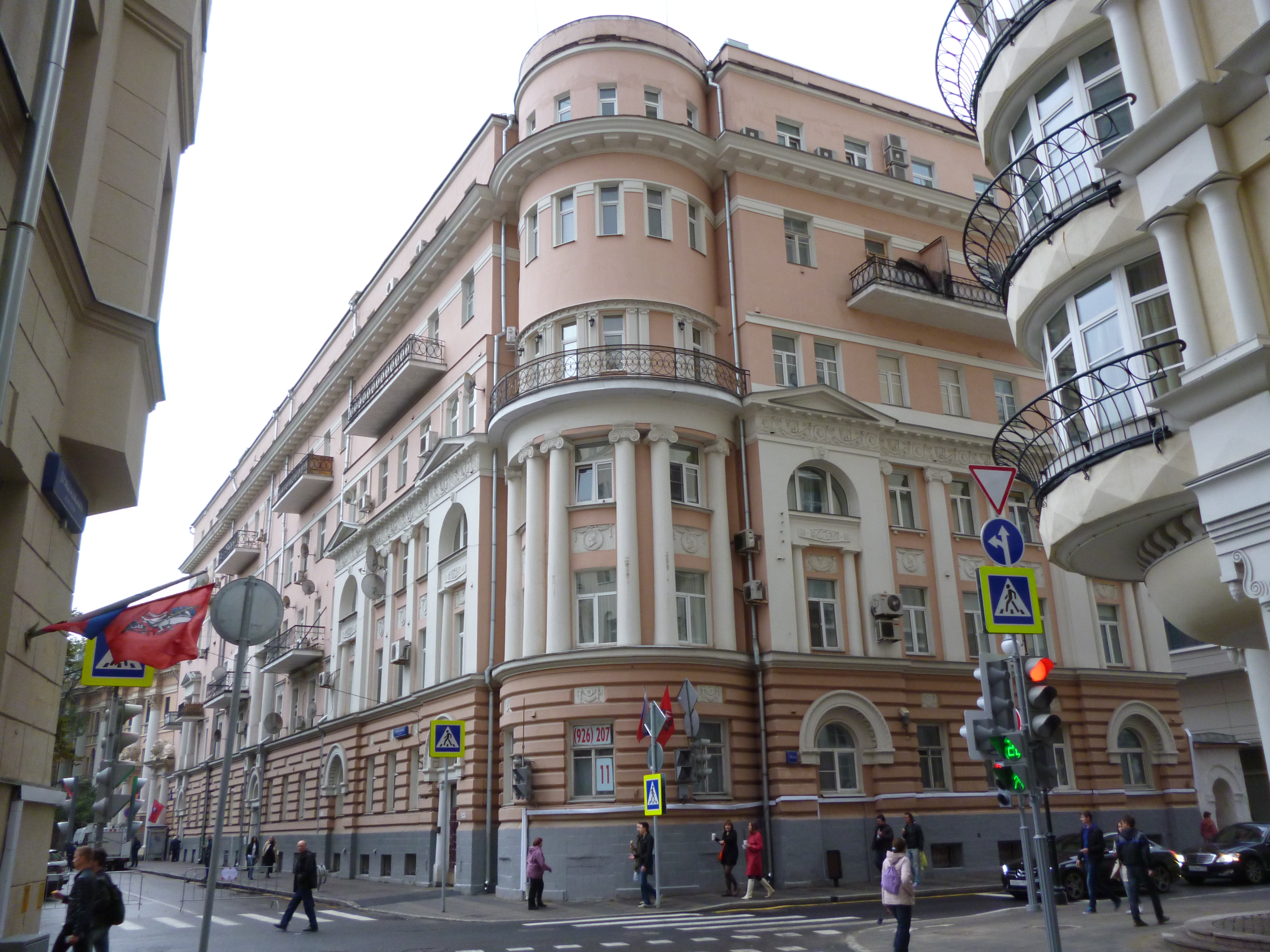
- Location: Moscow, Malaya Bronnaya st., house 31/13
- Coordinates: 55°45′55″N 37°35′29″E

The Profitable house of A. D. Sidamon-Eristov (Russian: Доходный дом А. Д. Сидамона-Эристова) is a building in the center of Moscow near the Patriarch's Ponds (Malaya Bronnaya st., house 31/13). It was built in 1910-1911 in neoclassical style according to the project of architect V. A. Velichkin. It has the status of an object of cultural heritage of regional significance.

== History and description ==
The apartment house on Malaya Bronnaya was built in 1910-1911 by the order of Prince Alexander Dmitrievich Sidamon-Eristov for renting out apartments. The author of the project was the well-known St. Petersburg architect Viktor Andreevich Velichkin.

In the 1930s, the house was transferred to the Ministry of Defense of the USSR. Apartments in it were issued to prominent Soviet commanders. In 1939 the house was built on two floors. In 1947, from the west, architect Smirnov in a similar style was added one more section, later the total volume was built up by another floor.

By the beginning of the 21st century the house remains residential. There lived an entertainer N. Smirnov-Sokolsky, there is a memorial plaque on the house (2009).

A six-story L-shaped house is located at the intersection of Malaya Bronnaya Street and Ermolaevsky Lane. The house is decorated in neoclassical style. The street facades are symmetrical with respect to the half-rotund corner part, which is the compositional center of the building. The second and third floors are joined by paired semi-columns with Ionic capitals. On the half-columns of the corner part there is a smooth entablature, above which a semicircular girdle balcony. In the piers between the windows of the second and third floors are placed stucco bas-reliefs, stylized as antique. The street facades are finished with plaster, the first floor is rustovan. Door apertures are completed by semi-circular niches. Floors from the fourth to the sixth have a more modest decor, the courtyard facades of the decor have almost no.
