= Zaal, Duke of Aragvi =

Zaal (Georgian: ზაალ არაგვის ერისთავი, romanized: zaal aragvis eristavi; died 13 May 1660), was a Georgian duke (eristavi) of the Duchy of Aragvi from 1635 to 1660.

== Biography ==
Zaal was the son of Nugzar, Duke of Aragvi. He succeeded his brother Datuna as duke after the latter's death. During the struggle for the throne between Rostom and Teimuraz I, he initially sided with Teimuraz. Along with Jesse, Duke of Ksani, and other Kartli nobles, he invited Teimuraz, who had fled to Imereti, to become king. In 1648, after Teimuraz was expelled from Kakheti, Zaal and the other nobles sought reconciliation with Rostom. The king agreed on the condition that Zaal appear before the Shah of Iran. The Shah received him with great honor, granting him 500 tumans, a robe, a horse with golden harness, and 15 villages near Qazvin, before allowing him to return to his homeland. Zaal also took possession of Ertso-Tianeti.

After Rostom's death in 1658, Zaal did not recognize his successor, Vakhtang V, as king. In order to resolve the conflict, the Shah summoned Zaal to his court. The duke, along with his entourage, converted to Islam and returned to his homeland with great honors and gifts, but peace was soon broken. Zaal became one of the leaders of the Kakhetian uprising (1659/1660) against Iranian rule. Vakhtang managed to recruit Zaal's nephews, who killed their uncle in Dusheti.

== Family ==
Zaal was married to a unnamed niece of Bezhan Chkheidze. His children were:

- Zurab (died 1661), who married a daughter of Vakhtang V in 1655;
- Otia (fl. 1660–1688);
- Ketevan, who married Shalva, Duke of Ksani;
- Elene (Leluka) (fl. 1686–1705), who married Paremuz Cholokashvili;
- Tamar (fl. 1690), who married Vakhtang (Orbel), son of Prince Qaplan Baratashvili-Orbelishvili;
- Tinatin (in monasticism Teona; died 1709), who married Levan, son of Prince Paata Abashidze and elder brother of King George V of Imereti;
- Ana-Khanum (died 1718), who married Anduqapar, son of Prince Givi Amilakhvari;
- An unnamed daughter, who married Otia Gurieli, son of Simon II Gurieli and Queen Mariam Dadiani.
