= Prince Luarsab of Kartli (died 1698) =

Georgian prince (1660–1698)

Prince Luarsab
- Died: November 1698
- Spouse: Mariam of Aragvi
- Issue: Prince Alexander; Princess Helen
- Dynasty: Bagrationi
- Father: Vakhtang V
- Mother: Rodam Qaplanishvili
- Religion: Georgian Orthodox Church

Luarsab (Georgian: ლუარსაბი, romanized: luarsabi; died November 1698) was a Georgian prince royal (batonishvili) of the Bagratid House of Mukhrani of Kartli. He was a son of King Vakhtang V and spent nearly two decades as a hostage in Iran.

== Biography ==
Luarsab was born into the family of Prince Vakhtang, Prince of Mukhrani, who was adopted by the childless King Rostom of Kartli and acceded to the throne on Rostom's death in 1658. Around 1675, Luarsab and his elder brother, Archil, departed to the Ottoman-controlled Akhaltsikhe in a bid to acquire the Kingdom of Imereti, which was within the Ottoman sphere of influence. This venture posed a risk of conflict between the Ottomans and the Iranian Safavids, which exercised their suzerainty over the kings of Kartli.

The Shah of Iran, Suleiman I, held Vakhtang V responsible for his sons as the king failed to bring them back to Kartli. Vakhtang had to repair to the Shah Suleiman I to offer explanation, but he died on his way to Isfahan, being succeeded on the throne by his son George XI. The shah demanded from the new king immediate detention and surrender of his fugitive brothers. George allowed Archil to escape to Imereti, but he had to assuage the shah's anger by sending Luarsab as an honorary hostage to Iran in 1679. In 1688, when tensions between George XI and the Safavid government reached a high point, the shah had Luarsab and other hostages, George's only son Bagrat and another brother Levan, arrested. On the way to his exile to Kerman, Luarsab was forcibly converted to Islam and was held captive until George reconciled with the Safavids and, in a show of loyalty, in 1696 paid a visit to Shah Soltan Hoseyn in Isfahan, where he met his freed brothers (George's son Bagrat died in exile in Herat). Luarsab died shortly thereafter, in 1698.

== Family ==
Luarsab was married twice. His first wife was Mariam, daughter of Revaz, Duke of Aragvi, whom he wed at Lilo near Tbilisi around 1669. He married secondly, in 1684, a niece of Shoshita II, Duke of Racha.

Luarsab had two children. His natural son, Alexander, entered the Safavid service in 1708 and rose to a high rank. According to the 18th-century historian Prince Vakhushti, he is the same Alexander who died fighting the Afghan rebels in 1711. Alternatively, based on the account of Sekhnia Chkheidze, a contemporary historian and a companion of the Georgian royals to Iran, the Alexander of the Afghan war is considered by the historians Marie-Félicité Brosset and Cyril Toumanoff to have been a son of Luarsab's brother Levan. Of his first marriage, Luarsab also had a daughter, Helen, whose hand was vainly sought from her uncle, George XI, by Alexander IV of Imereti.

== Ancestry ==
Ancestors of Prince Luarsab of Kartli (died 1698)

16. Bagrat, Prince of Mukhrani
8. Vakhtang I, Prince of Mukhrani
17. Helen
4. Teimuraz I, Prince of Mukhrani
2. Vakhtang V
20. N. Sidamoni
10. Nugzar, Duke of Aragvi
21. Ana N.
5. Ana of Aragvi
11. Dedisimedi N. or Mariam Cholokashvili
1. Luarsab
24. N. Baratashvili
12. Orbel Baratashvili
6. Qaplan Baratashvili-Orbeliani
3. Rodam Qaplanishvili
14. N.N, Meskhian amilakhor
7. Tamar N.
