= Zezva Gaprindauli =

Georgian leader (from the country of Georgia)

Zezva Gaprindauli (Georgian: ზეზვა გაფრინდაული) was a leader during the Bakhtrioni Uprising of 1659. Leading the Tushetians during the uprising, they alongside the Georgian mountain tribes would attack the Safavid garrisons. In the Battle of Bakhtrioni, Zezva commanded the units that would breach the fortress walls, killing the guards and opening the gates for a larger army to enter. After the fortress was captured, his unit participated in a battle in the Alazani Valley, which was a victory. After that, Zezva fortified himself in the Pankisi fortress. However, he was later captured for treason and imprisoned in Tbilisi, where he would later be executed.

== Sources ==
- ჯამბურია, გ. (1978). ქართული საბჭოთა ენციკლოპედია. Vol. 2. თბ. p. 19.
- ფუთურიძე, რ. (1944). "ციხე ბახტრიონის აღება". Ttbilisi: თსუ სტუდენტთა სამეცნიერო შრომების კრებული.
- ლეონიძე, გ. (1959). "გამოკვლევები და წერილები". Tbilisi.
