= Shahnavaziani =

17th-century Georgian poem

The Shahnavaziani (Georgian: შაჰნავაზიანი) is a 17th-century Georgian poem that covers the period from 1658 to 1665 during the rule of King Vakhtang V (r. 1658–1676), who adopted the name Shahnavaz after becoming a Muslim. It was written in 1664/65 by P‘ešangi Xit’arišvili (Peshangi Khitarishvili).

The work is the first known instance of a documentary poem in Georgian literature.

== See also ==
- Visramiani
- Amiran-Darejaniani

== Sources ==
- Baindurashvili, Khatuna (2017). "Šahnavaziani". Christian-Muslim Relations. A Bibliographical History. Volume 10 Ottoman and Safavid Empires (1600-1700). Brill.
