= Bakhtrioni uprising =

1659 battle

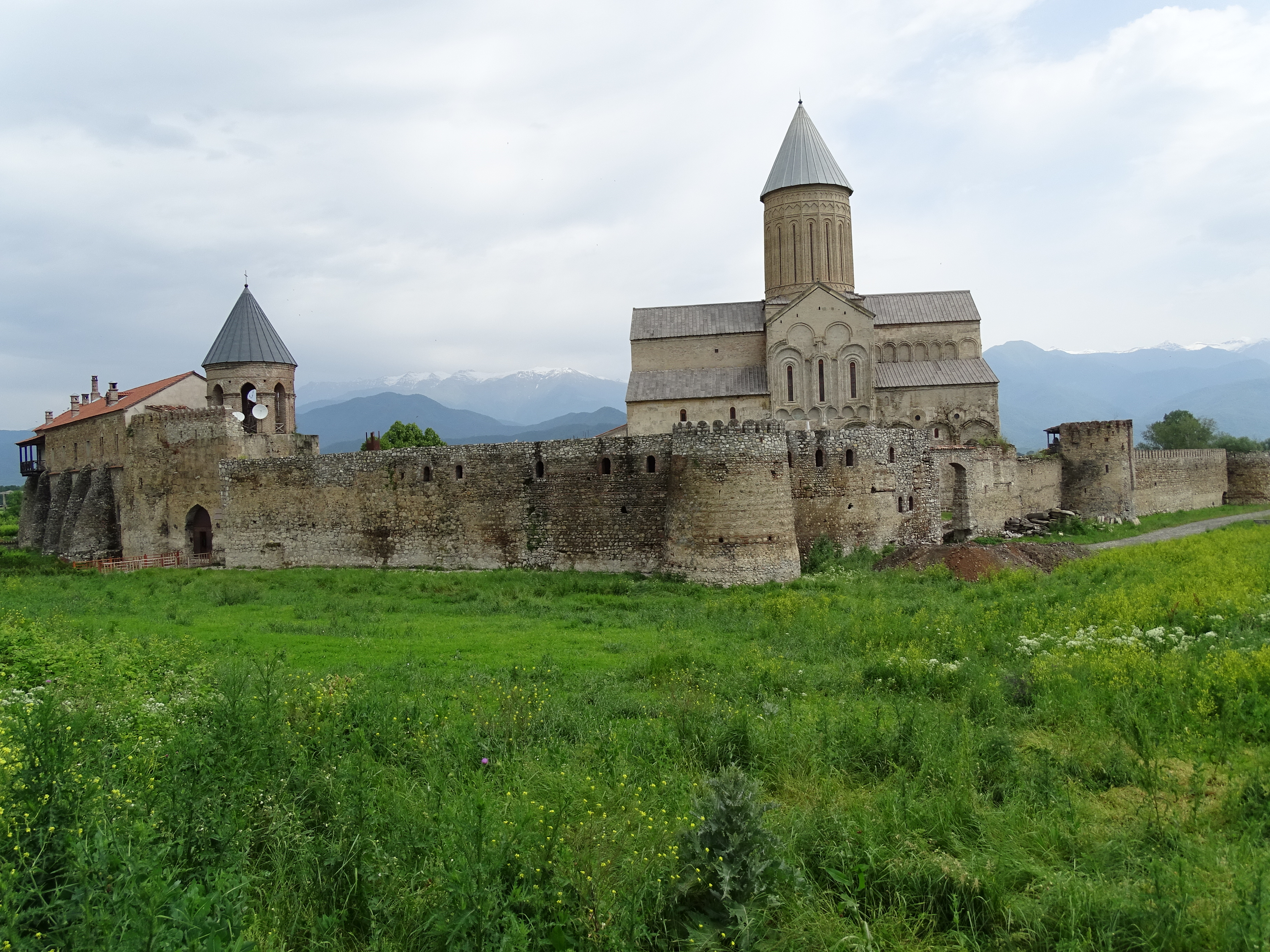
- Alaverdi Monastery, one of the crucial battlefields during the uprising.
Date	September 1659
Location	Bakhtrioni fortress, Alaverdi Monastery
Result	See § Aftermath

Belligerents
Kingdom of Kakheti; Tushetians; Pshavs; Khevsurs: Duchy of Ksani	Safavid Empire; Turcoman tribes; Kingdom of Kartli

Commanders and leaders
Bidzina Cholokashvili (executed); Zaal of Aragvi (executed); Shalva of Ksani (executed); Elizbar of Ksani (executed); Nadira Khosharauli (executed); Zezva Gaprindauli (executed); Gogolauri	Shah Abbas II; Selim Khan; Murtuz Ali Khan; Vakhtang V

Strength
Unknown	Unknown

Casualties and losses
Unknown	80,000 Turcomans killed or expelled from Kakheti

The Bakhtrioni uprising (Georgian: ბახტრიონის აჯანყება) was a general revolt in the eastern Georgian Kingdom of Kakheti against the political domination of Safavid Persia, in 1659. Despite the fact that the Persians were able to suppress the uprising later, they were forced to abandon plans to settle Georgia with the Qizilbash.

== Background ==
In the first half of the 17th century, Kakhetian king Teimuraz I had conducted resistance against his Persian overlords, which culminated in the bloody and devastating years of the mid-1610s; after successfully repelling an expedition sent by Shah Abbas I, Kakheti was invaded once again by the Shah himself in 1616, much of its population massacred or deported. In the following years, Qizilbash lords were appointed as governors of Kakheti, while a large number of Qizilbash tribal folk were relocated to Georgia to strengthen the central control. In the early 1630s, the Persians tried to put Kakheti under control of the more submissive Kingdom of Kartli, led by Georgian prince Rostom, a convert to Islam. When such control had been installed, Teimuraz fled to Western Georgia. In the 1650s, the Persians implemented a policy of colonization of Kakheti by Qizilbash Turkoman tribes, for several reasons. One of these reasons was to repopulate this part of the province, while another was to keep an eye on the restless nobles. Yet another reason was because the Safavid possessions in Georgia were geographically close to the Daghestan province. From Daghestan, Lezgian marauders frequently organized raids into parts of the northwestern Safavid domains, including Safavid Georgia. Lastly, it was also decided as a measure against Russia, which had increased its pressure on Daghestan (see also; Russo-Persian War of 1651–1653), a neighboring province of the Georgia province.

The forced installation of the Qizilbash was the immediate motive for the uprising. Kakheti had been divided into two administrative regions: he south-eastern part was under the power of the beylerbey of Karabakh, the rest under that of Nakhchivan. Up to 80,000 Turkomans migrated to Kakheti. They started building a fortress at Bakhtrioni and transforming the ancient monastery of Alaverdi into one.

== Uprising ==
As in 1615, the uprising was inspired by the main noble families who had remained faithful to Teimuraz I. However, according to Georgian accounts, the majority of the population took part in it, as they were being evicted from their villages and farms by the incomers. The Eristavi Zaal, Duke of Aragvi, one of the main feudal lords in Kakheti and a former supporter of Teimuraz—who had pledged allegiance to Rostom and the Persians in 1648, thus gaining even more power—took the lead of the uprising. Among the leaders were Bidzina Cholokashvili, Shalva, Duke of Ksani, and his brother Elizbar. Georgian mountain people, such as the Tushs, the Khevsurians and the Pshavs, also joined the rebellion, under the leadership of Zezva Gaprindauli, Nadira Khosharauli, and Gogolauri.

The Georgian forces, once united, attacked the Turkoman fortresses at Bakhtrioni and Alaverdi and vanquished them. They then defeated Turkoman forces in other parts of Kakheti. However, the weak organization and isolation of the rebels allowed the Persians—now under the personal direction of Shah Abbas II—to successfully counter-attack and defeat them.

Zaal was murdered by his nephews at the order of the Shah, and his children were sent to the Persian court. Upon hearing the news, Bidzina, Shalva, and Elizbar asked the Shah for forgiveness, but he had them delivered to the tribes that the insurgents had massacred earlier. They were tortured and put to death. They would later be canonized by the Georgian Orthodox Church.

== Aftermath ==
Kakheti remained under Persian rule, even if the rebels had succeeded in defeating the Turkomans, who did not remain in the region In 1664, the Persians agreed to have Archil II (Shah-Nazar Khan), son of the king/wali of Kartli, installed as king/wali of Kakheti.

The uprising soon entered Georgian collective memory, and many songs and poems were composed about it, while the mountain warriors became well-known folk heroes. The battle at Bakhtrioni, and the heroism of the mountaineers, inspired Vazha-Pshavela to write his epic poem Bakhtrioni (1892), while Akaki Tsereteli wrote the novel Bashi-Achuki about it.

== Sources ==
- Matthee, Rudi (2012). Persia in Crisis: Safavid Decline and the Fall of Isfahan. I.B.Tauris. ISBN 978-1845117450.
- Rayfield, Donald (2012). The Edges of Empire (Kindle ed.). Reaktion Books. ISBN 978-1780230306.
- Suny, Ronald Grigor (1994). The Making of the Georgian Nation. Indiana University Press. ISBN 978-0253209153.
- საქართველოს ისტორიის ნარკვევები, ტ. 4, თბ., 1973;
- Lortkipanidze, Mariam; Japaridze, Otar; Muskhelishvili, David; Metreveli, Roin (2012). History of Georgia in four volumes, vol. II - History of Georgia from the 13th century to the 19th century. Tbilisi: National Academy of Sciences of Georgia. ISBN 978-9941-19-407-8.
- Karimi, Farhad (2024). The Safavids. Iranian shah dynasty (in Russian). Translate to Russian. Moscow: ACT. ISBN 978-5-17-167692-6.
