= Bidzina Cholokashvili =

Georgian Orthodox martyr (died c. 1600)

Saint Bidzina Cholokashvili
- Died: ca. 1660
- Venerated in: Georgian Orthodox Church
- Feast: October 1

Bidzina Cholokashvili (Georgian: ბიძინა ჩოლოყაშვილი; died c. 1660) is a Georgian Christian martyr canonized by the Georgian Orthodox Church. His feast is celebrated on October 1. He was one of the leaders of Bakhtrioni Uprising (1659). During the 1630s he was a sakhltukhutsesi of Kingdom of Kakheti. In the battle between Teimuraz and Rostom he supported the former. In 1648 by order of Teimuraz, he invaded Ertso in order to make Ertso-Tianeti subordinate to the King. After the uprising Shah summoned Bidzina as well as Shalva and Elizbar Eristavi, who later were forced to converse their religion, but none of them accepted. As a result, they were given to tribes whose members were slaughtered during the uprising. Bidzina was tortured and killed.
