= Simon Sidamon-Eristoff =

Prince Simon Sidamon-Eristavi (Georgian: სიმონ სიდამონ-ერისთავი) (February 6, 1891 – September 14, 1964) was a Georgian aristocrat and soldier, who began his career in the Imperial Russian army and became one of the leading officers in the Democratic Republic of Georgia. Following the sovietization of Georgia in 1921, he immigrated to the United States, where he was known as Simon Sidamon-Eristoff after his Russified surname and worked as an engineer. His son Constantine and grandson Andrew had political careers in the United States.

== Biography ==
Simon Sidamon-Eristavi was born in Tiflis, a scion of the Georgian noble family of Sidamoni, whose principal branch ran the duchy of Aragvi from 1578 to 1743. He was educated at the Cadets Corps and Mikhailovsky Artillery College. During World War I, he rose to the rank of colonel in the Russian army. When Georgia declared independence in 1918, Sidamon-Eristavi became one of the founding officers of the Georgian army. In 1921, he took part in the war against the invading Soviet Russian army as a divisional chief of staff. After the fall of the independent Georgian republic, he immigrated to the United States, where he obtained a degree in engineering from the Johns Hopkins University and worked, thereafter, as an engineer with several American companies. He was also involved with several Georgian emigre associations in the United States. In 1931, he was granted the United States citizenship. He died in New York City in 1964.

== Family ==
Sidamon-Eristavi was married twice. He wed his first wife Tamara Sidamon-Eristavi in Moscow in 1913 and had a daughter Irina by her. In 1926, Simon Sidamon-Eristavi, then a widower, married, in New York City, his second wife, Anne Tracy (1890–1978), a descendant of John Bigelow, an American diplomat in the mid-19th century. They had a son, Constantine, and a daughter, Anne. Constantine Sidamon-Eristoff was a lawyer, an environmental advocate and a New York City Transportation Administrator. Constantine's eldest son Simon is a land conservation lawyer and Chairman of the Chesapeake Bay Foundation. His younger son Andrew was a Republican Party politician in New York and was New Jersey State Treasurer from 2010 to 2015. Simon Sidamon-Eristavi's memoirs were published by his son Constantine in 2004.
