= Constantine Sidamon-Eristoff =

American-born Georgian aristocrat

Constantine Sidamon-Eristoff (June 28, 1930 – December 26, 2011) was an American-born Georgian aristocrat and the New York City highway commissioner during the administrations of John V. Lindsay.

== Early life ==
Constantine was born in New York City into the house of Sidamon-Eristavi, claiming descent from the medieval kings of Aragvi. He was the son of Prince Simon Sidamon-Eristoff, a Georgian military officer, who emigrated to the United States after the Bolsheviks invaded Georgia in 1921, and Anne Tracy, a descendant of John Bigelow, an American diplomat in the mid-19th century. In 1957 he married Anne Phipps Sidamon-Eristoff, a granddaughter of Andrew Carnegie's partner, Henry Phipps.

== Politics ==
Sidamon-Estiroff served as the New York City highway commissioner in the administration of Mayor John V. Lindsay. Beginning with his appointment by Governor Malcolm Wilson of New York in 1974–1989 he served as a member of the Metropolitan Transportation Authority.

From 1989 until 1993 under President George H. W. Bush, he served as the director of the New York Region #2 (encompassing New York, New Jersey, Puerto Rico, and the United States Virgin Islands) of the United States Environmental Protection Agency.

== Philanthropy ==
In 1994, Sidamon-Eristoff founded American Friends of Georgia. Since then, AFG has been working toward its mission to provide practical humanitarian assistance to the people of Georgia in order to improve educational, economic, social, medical, and environmental conditions. American Friends of Georgia is a U.S. non-profit, non-political 501(c)(3) public charity with tax-exempt status. Upon his death, his son Simon Sidamon-Eristoff took over as chairman.

== Death ==
Sidamon-Eristoff died on December 26, 2011, in New York City, aged 81. His son Andrew has been involved in New York City and State politics, and was the New Jersey State Treasurer from January 2010 until July 2015.
