= Khevsurians =

Ethnic group

ხევსურები
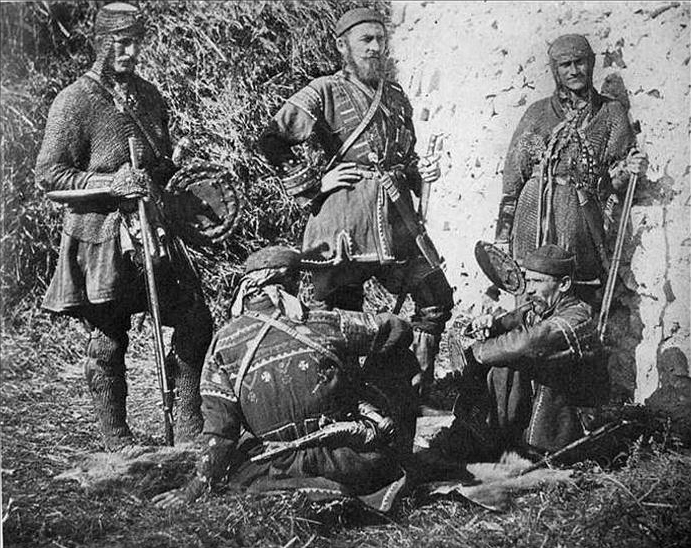
- Khevsurians in traditional dress (apr. 1900)

Regions with significant populations
- Khevsureti (Georgia)

Languages
- Georgian

Religion
- Christianity (Georgian Orthodox)

Khevsurians (Georgian: ხევსურები, romanized: khevsurebi) are an ethnographic group of Georgians, mainly living in Khevsureti, on both sides of the Caucasus Mountain Chain in the watersheds of the rivers Aragvi and Argun. There are some villages in Khevi, Ertso-Tianeti, Kakheti (Shiraki), Kvemo Kartli (Gardabani) also where Khevsurians reside. Khevsurians speak the Georgian language in Khevsurian dialect. For a long time, Khevsurians have maintained their traditional culture: clothing, weapons, and polyphonic music.

== History ==
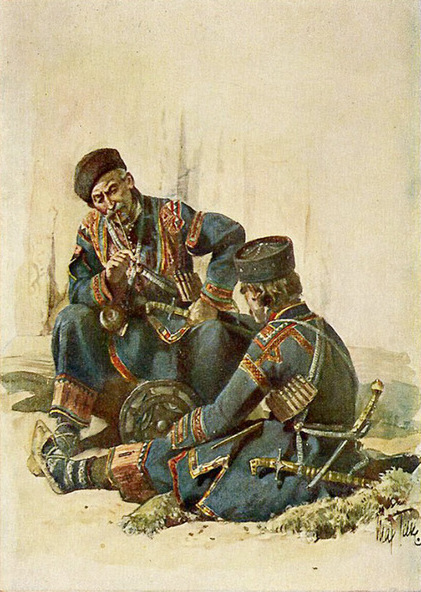
Khevsurians in traditional dress in 1920.

Khevsurians first are mentioned in the 10th-century manuscripts. In 1745 they were described by Vakhushti Bagrationi in his work Description of the Kingdom of Georgia.

In the old Georgian chronicle, Khevsureti and Pshavi are referred to together as "Pkhovi", while the Pshavians and Khevsurians themselves were called "Pkhoveli". This is evidenced by the reference of Vakhushti. He says in the description of the north-eastern part of Heret-Kakheti: "But they are called Pshav Khevsur, who previously were called Pkhoelni".

The Kists bordering Khevsureti still call Khevsureti "Pkhia" or "Pkhye", which means the same as "Pkhoeli".

Anthropologically, Khevsurians have a slim, east Georgian type of face; due to harsh living conditions in mountain areas, many of them are thin. Khevsurians generally have light colored eyes and hair color ranging from blonde to black.

In autumn of 1811, the Khevsurians and Ingush joined the uprising that broke out in the region of Kakheti led by the fugitive Georgian prince Alexander.

Between 1951 and 1953, Soviet authorities forcibly resettled many Khevsurs from their traditional mountain homeland to designated lowland areas. The official justification for the resettlement was to provide the Khevsurs with better access to public services and to have them participate in collective farming communities with other ethnic groups from their area.

Conversely, first-hand accounts collected from Khevsurs who were a part of this resettlement program describe the process as traumatic and destabilizing. Many testimonies include similar details of resettled Khevsurs being sent to areas with inadequate resources, which led to conflict, both social and physical, between other resettled groups such as the Tatars and Kakhetians.

As a result of these resettlements, many elements of Khevsur culture are in danger of being lost, such as traditional dress and religious practices.

== Bibliography ==
- Далгат, Б. К. (2008). Тишков, В. А.; Куделин, А. Б.; Гацак, В. М. (eds.). Родовой быт и обычное право чеченцев и ингушей. Исследование и материалы 1892-1894 гг. [Tribal life and customary law of the Chechens and Ingush. Research and materials of 1892-1894] (in Russian). Москва: ИМЛИ РАН. pp. 1–382. ISBN 978-5-9208-0307-8.
- Джабаги, В.-Г. (June 1953). "Падение Грузии и Закавказских ханств (к 170-летию Георгиевского трактата)" [The fall of Georgia and the Transcaucasian Khanates (to the 170th anniversary of the Treaty of Georgievsk)]. DerFreieKaukasus (in Russian). 6 (21). Münhen.
