= Igor Velichkin =

Russian ice hockey player (born 1987)

- Born: 3 July 1987 (age 39) Magnitogorsk, URS
- Height: 6 ft 1 in (185 cm)
- Weight: 187 lb (85 kg; 13 st 5 lb)
- Position: Forward
- Shoots: Left
- KHL team Former teams: Free Agent; Lada Togliatti; Metallurg Magnitogorsk; Traktor Chelyabinsk; HC Vityaz; Avtomobilist Yekaterinburg; Metallurg Novokuznetsk; Kunlun Red Star; Amur Khabarovsk; HC 19 Humenné
- NHL draft: Undrafted
- Playing career: 2003–present

Igor Velichkin (born 3 July 1987) is a Russian professional ice hockey forward. He is currently player of HC 19 Humenné who most recently played for Amur Khabarovsk of the Kontinental Hockey League (KHL).

Velichkin made his KHL debut with Traktor Chelyabinsk during the inaugural 2008–09 KHL season.
