= Andrew Sidamon-Eristoff =

American politician (born 1963)

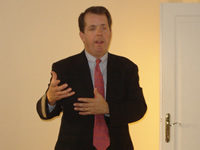

Treasurer of New Jersey
- In office January 19, 2010 – July 2, 2015; Acting: January 19, 2010 – March 2, 2010
- Governor: Chris Christie
- Preceded by: David Rousseau
- Succeeded by: Robert Romano (Acting)

Commissioner of the New York State Department of Taxation and Finance
- In office September 16, 2003 – November 3, 2006
- Governor: George Pataki
- Preceded by: Arthur Roth
- Succeeded by: Robert Megna

Commissioner of the New York City Department of Finance
- In office 1999–2002
- Mayor: Rudy Giuliani
- Preceded by: Alfred Cerullo
- Succeeded by: Martha Stark

Member of the New York City Council from the 4th district
- In office March 12, 1993 – July 1, 1999
- Preceded by: Carolyn Maloney
- Succeeded by: Eva Moskowitz

Personal details
- Born: February 20, 1963 (age 63) New York City, New York, U.S.
- Party: Republican
- Parent: Constantine Sidamon-Eristoff (father)
- Education: Princeton University (BA); Georgetown University (JD); Washington University (LLM)

Andrew P. Sidamon-Eristoff (born February 20, 1963) is an American Republican Party lawyer, politician and government official from New York City who served as New Jersey State Treasurer under Governor Chris Christie from January 2010 until his resignation in July 2015. He served as Commissioner of Tax and Finance under New York State Governor George E. Pataki from September 2003 until November 2006 and as Commissioner of Finance for the City of New York under Mayor Rudolph Giuliani from 1999 to 2002.

== Education and family background ==
Eristoff graduated from Princeton University in 1985 and received a juris doctor degree from Georgetown University Law Center in 1989. In 2000, Eristoff earned an Advanced Professional Certificate in Information Technology from New York University.

Andrew is the youngest of three children. His older brother, Simon Sidamon-Eristoff, is on the board of many charitable and non-profit organizations and Of Counsel to Washington DC–based Firm, Kalbian Hagerty LLP, where he specializes in all aspects of doing business as a charity. Andrew Sidamon-Eristoff is the son of the late lawyer, government official, and environmental advocate Constantine Sidamon-Eristoff (1930–2011) and Anne Phipps Sidamon-Eristoff. His great-grandfather, Henry Phipps, was a partner of Andrew Carnegie. On his father's side, Eristoff is a grandson of Prince Simon Sidamon-Eristoff (1891–1961), a Georgian military officer and a scion of the noble Sidamoni-Eristavi family, who emigrated to the United States after the Bolsheviks invaded Georgia in 1921, and married Anne Tracy, a descendant of John Bigelow, an American lawyer, editor and diplomat in the mid-19th century.

== Political career ==
Eristoff served as a New York City Council member from 1993 until 1999, elected three times to represent an overwhelmingly Democratic district on Manhattan's East Side. In addition to focusing on quality-of-life issues (he wrote the Taxi Rider's Bill of Rights and a law to ban panhandling near automated teller machines, for example), Eristoff became the Council's leading expert on technology and was made Chairman of the Council's Task Force on Technology in Government, the first Republican to hold a chair in modern times. In 1999, Eristoff became New York City Commissioner of Finance under Mayor Rudy Giuliani. He served in that role until 2002, earning recognition for implementing management strategies that leveraged technology and performance measurement to reduce costs, increase collections, and improve customer service.

After serving briefly as Chairman of the New York [Manhattan] Republican County Committee, and an unsuccessful race for New York State Senate in 2002, Governor George Pataki appointed Eristoff Executive Deputy Commissioner of the New York State Department of Taxation and Finance. In September 2003, Eristoff was nominated and confirmed as Commissioner of Tax and Finance. As chief executive of the second-largest state revenue administration, Commissioner Eristoff oversaw a budget of over $400 million, managed over 4,600 employees, and was responsible for $77 billion in annual state and local revenues. He was a national leader in state- and national-level data sharing initiatives to support compliance programs; stabilized a multi-year $100 million IT project to build an integrated tax system; oversaw a landmark tax shelter amnesty initiative; and implemented project portfolio management and performance-based budgeting programs.

In January 2007, Eristoff applied to the New York State Legislature to be among the candidates screened to replace former New York State Comptroller Alan Hevesi. In 2008, Eristoff served as Manhattan Coordinator for McCain-Palin 2008.

On January 14, 2010, he was nominated by New Jersey Governor Chris Christie as State Treasurer. Eristoff assumed the duties of Acting State Treasurer on January 19, 2010. The New Jersey Senate confirmed his nomination on February 22. He was sworn in on March 2, 2010. The longest-serving Treasurer in almost 40 years, Eristoff oversaw a major department with nearly 3,100 employees and more than 10 divisions spanning budget, revenue collection, public finance and debt management, benefits administration, pension fund investments, Statewide information technology standards and infrastructure, procurement, State facilities, risk management, unclaimed property administration, and the State Lottery. In addition to managing the development and execution of New Jersey's $30 billion-plus annual budget, Eristoff played a significant role in developing Governor Christie's landmark 2001 pension and health benefits reforms, designed and implemented Governor Christie's Performance Budgeting Initiative, drafted Governor's Christie's $2.3 billion business tax reduction package of 2011, advanced significant procurement process reforms, managed several major privatization initiatives, restructured the State's IT governance configuration, and oversaw debt and financial management reforms that achieved $1.9 billion in budget savings and eliminated the State's exposure to $4.2 billion in risky derivatives.

In 2016, Eristoff supported Gary Johnson's Presidential candidacy. In 2020, he supported the Presidential candidacy of Joe Biden. In December 2022, Eristoff announced he was considering a run for Mercer County Executive. In January 2023, Eristoff decided not to run for the position.

Eristoff had expressed interest in running against Bob Menendez for United States Senate in 2024.

== Electoral history ==
- 2002 special election for New York State Senate, 26th District
  - Andrew S. Eristoff (R), 40.7%
  - Liz Krueger (D), 59.3%
- 1997 election for New York City Council, 4th District
  - Andrew S. Eristoff (R), 52.48%
  - Eva Moskowitz (D), 46.70%
- 1993 election for New York City Council, 4th District
  - Andrew S. Eristoff (R), 50.22%
  - Jane R. Crotty (D), 49.78%
- 1993 special election for New York City Council, 4th District
  - Andrew S. Eristoff (R), 27.92%
  - Jane R. Crotty (D), 27.41%
  - Jo-Ann M. Polise (D), 18.32%
  - Warrie L. Price (D), 12.78%
  - Paula M. Blasband (D), 8.19%
  - Michael B. Gordon (D), 3.55%
  - Wayne D. Fischer (D), 1.85%

Civic offices
Preceded by Carolyn Maloney	Member of the New York City Council from the 4th district 1993–1999	Succeeded by Eva Moskowitz
Political offices
Preceded by David Rousseau	Treasurer of New Jersey; 2010–2015	Succeeded by Robert Romano; Acting
