= Givi Amilakhvari (died 1700) =

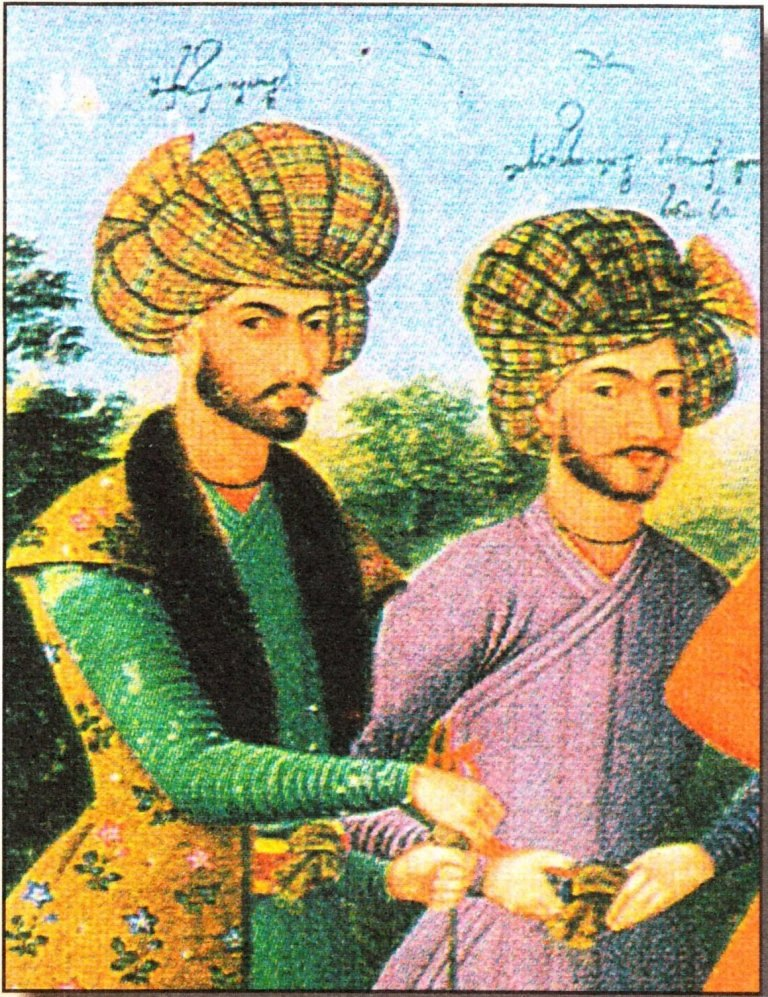
King Archil II and Givi Amilakhvari.

Givi Amilakhvari (Georgian: გივი იოთამის ძე ამილახვარი, romanized: givi iotamis dze amilakhvari; died 1 September 1700) was the head of the Amilakhvari family, commander of the Zemo Kartli banner, and governor of Gori from 1656 to 1696. He was the son of Iotam Amilakhvari and a follower of the policies of Vakhtang V and Archil II. In 1688, Givi took an active part in the rebellion of George XI against Safavid Iran. Following the defeat of the rebellion, he took refuge in Racha, where he died in 1700.

== Family ==
Givi Amilakhvari was married to Tamar (in monasticism, Gaiane; died 1695), daughter of King Vakhtang V. Their children were:

- Anduqapar (fl. 1665–1683);
- Demetrius (died 1728), who married Tamar, daughter of Datuna, Duke of Ksani;
- Christopher (died 1732);
- Giorgi (died 1724), who died in battle;
- Vakhtang (died 1723), Sakhltukhutsesi, who was killed during a clash with the Kakhetian army.
