= Gogoberidze =

Gogoberidze (also spelled Ghoghoberidze) is a Georgian language patronymic surname. Notable people with the surname include:

- Avtandil Gogoberidze
- Lana Gogoberidze
- Levan Gogoberidze
- Nutsa Gogoberidze
