= Bakhtrioni =

17th century fortress in Georgia

- ბახტრიონი
- Akhmeta municipality, Kakheti, Georgia

Site information
- Condition: Ruined

Location
- Coordinates: 42.051639°N 45.242917°E

Site history
- Built: 1650s
- Demolished: 1659

Bakhtrioni (Georgian: ბახტრიონი, bɑχtʼrɪɔnɪ) is a ruined 17th-century fortress in the eastern Georgian region of Kakheti, on the left bank of the Alazani river near its confluence with the Ilto. The fortress served as a Safavid Iranian outpost in the 1650s until the rebellious Georgians captured and demolished it. Only insignificant ruins of the Bakhtrioni fortress have survived.

== History ==
The name of the Bakhtrioni fortress derives from the former village Bakhtriani near which it was constructed in the 1650s. It was garrisoned by a Qizilbash force left by the Iranian government to reinforce its authority in the area and protect the Turkic nomads transplanted into the Georgian lands. The fortress overlooked a strategic locale, controlling roads to the Greater Caucasus mountains, inhabited by the bellicose Georgian highlanders of Tusheti, Pshavi, and Khevsureti.

In 1659 the Georgian highlanders moved to join the rebellious people of Kakheti in a surprise attack on Bakhtrioni. In the ensuing battle, the entire Qizilbash force was annihilated and the rebels proceeded to capture another Iranian stronghold, that of Alaverdi. These events are widely acclaimed in folk tradition which has preserved the names of the highlander heroes of the battle of Bakhtrioni such as the Tush Zezva Gaprindauli, the Khevsur Nadira Khosharauli, and the Pshav Gogolauri. It also inspired the late 19th-century Georgian poet Vazha-Pshavela to write his patriotic epic poem Bakhtrioni (1892). Streets named after Bakhtrioni are found in Tbilisi, Akhmeta, Telavi, Lagodekhi, Kareli, and Kaspi.

== See also ==
- Telavi
- Gurjaani
- Tsinandali
