= House of Sidamoni =

Coat of arms of Princes Sidamonidze

The House of Sidamoni (Georgian: სიდამონი) was a noble family (tavadi) in Georgia, their principal line was known as Aragvis Eristavi (არაგვის ერისთავი) by virtue of being eristavi (“dukes”) of Aragvi from 1578 to 1743. They were also known as Sidamonidze (სიდამონიძე), Sidamonishvili (სიდამონიშვილი), and Sidamon-Eristavi (სიდამონ-ერისთავი). The family produced several important figures in Georgian politics, culture, and science.

== History ==
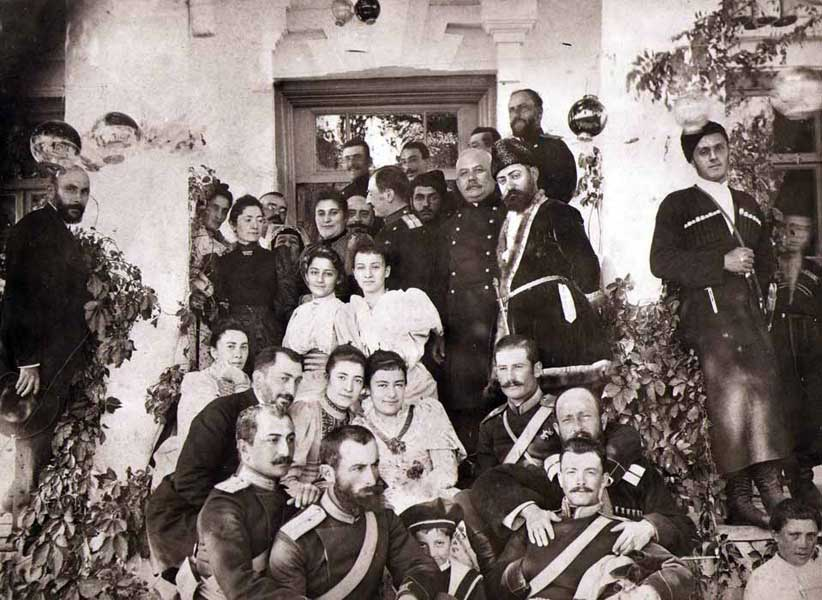
A family portrait of Prince Eristavi from the 19th century

The family claimed descent from the medieval kings of Alania. They originally lived in the village of Vanati on the Little Liakhvi River and, through the loyal service rendered to the Georgian kings of Kartli, rose in the ranks of nobility (aznauri) in the mid-16th century. In the 1578s, they secured the help of the Dukes of Ksani and took control of the Aragvi valley, being recognized as the eristavi (“duke”) of Aragvi by the crown in 1578.

The Eristavi of Aragvi pursued an aggressive, expansionist policy which resulted in important territorial acquisitions at the expense of other noble houses of Georgia. They were considered among the six "undivided" houses of the Kingdom of Kartli, which outranked those that had succumbed to the weakening division of their dynastic allods. Their loyalty to the crown was not permanent. In 1743, King Teimuraz II dispossessed the Sidamoni family of their duchy and his successor Erekle II forced them into retirement to Kakheti where they were granted a smaller estate and confirmed as Princes Sidamonishvili.

After the Russian annexation of Georgia in 1801, the Sidamonishvili attempted to restore their erstwhile titles and patrimonial estates in the Aragvi valley, but to no avail. Under the Russian rule, the three Sidamoni lines were received among princely nobility of the empire: two as Princes Eristov-Aragvsky (Russian: Эристов-Арагвский; 1828) and one as Princes Sidamon-Eristov (Сидамон-Эристов; 1826).

After the Soviet invasion the family was forced to leave Georgia, as they were likely to be placed in Siberian Gulags had they stayed.

== See also ==
- Andrew Eristoff, American politician
- Constantine Sidamon-Eristoff, American government official
- Simon Sidamon-Eristoff, Georgian noble
- Valerian Sidamon-Eristavi, Georgian artist
- Ephraim II of Georgia, Eastern Orthodox Patriarch
