= Ertso-Tianeti =

Ertso-Tianeti ერწო-თიანეთი
- Historical Region

- Location within Mtskheta-Mtianeti Location within Georgia
- Coordinates: 42°00′00″N 45°00′00″E
- Country: Georgia
- Mkhare: Mtskheta-Mtianeti
- Capital: Tianeti

Area
  - Total: 905 km^{2} (349 sq mi)

Population
  - Total: 13,400
  - Density: 14.8/km^{2} (38.3/sq mi)

Ertso-Tianeti (Georgian: ერწო-თიანეთი) is a small historical-geographic area in eastern Georgia. It lies along the upper Iori Valley in what is now Tianeti District in the region of Mtskheta-Mtianeti. The area's name is compound, consisting of its two subdivisions: Ertso (ერწო) in the south, and Tianeti (თიანეთი) in the north.

Ertso-Tianeti is located on the southern foothills of the Greater Caucasus mountains. Its historical borders are: Pshavi to the north, Kakheti to the south and east, and the Aragvi River on the west.

== History ==
Ertso-Tianeti was historically part of the saeristavo (duchy) of Kakheti. According to Georgian tradition and accounts from the 11th century, Saint Nino converted the inhabitants of the region to Christianity along with the rest of Iberia, c. 330. Due to its geographical location, Ertso-Tianeti was a region of great strategic and economical significance during the Middle Ages. It was traversed by a branch of the commercial road joining Kartli with Caucasian Albania and Armenia. During this period (6-9th centuries), Tianeti served as the foothold from which the lords of Kartli extended their political and cultural influence over the Greater Caucasus. During the struggle for unification of Georgia (10th century), the Kingdom of Abkhazia used the conquest of Tianeti to bring Kakheti into their allegiance. In the 13th century Ertso-Tianeti had to endure the Mongol invasions. In the 15th century, after the collapse of the unified Kingdom of Georgia, Ertso-Tianeti became one of the samouravo (districts) of the Kingdom of Kakheti. Its territory was the object of frequent conflicts between Kakheti and the Duchy of Aragvi. In 1614, the area was virtually depopulated as a result of the Persian invasion of the Kakheti. The vacated villages were later resettled by migrants from the neighboring mountain regions of Pshavi and Khevsureti, with which economic links have always been strong.

== See also ==
- Bochorma fortress
