= Lechkhumi =

Historical province in Georgia (country)

Coordinates: 42°38′59″N 42°45′35″E

Lechkhumi ლეჩხუმი
- Historical Region
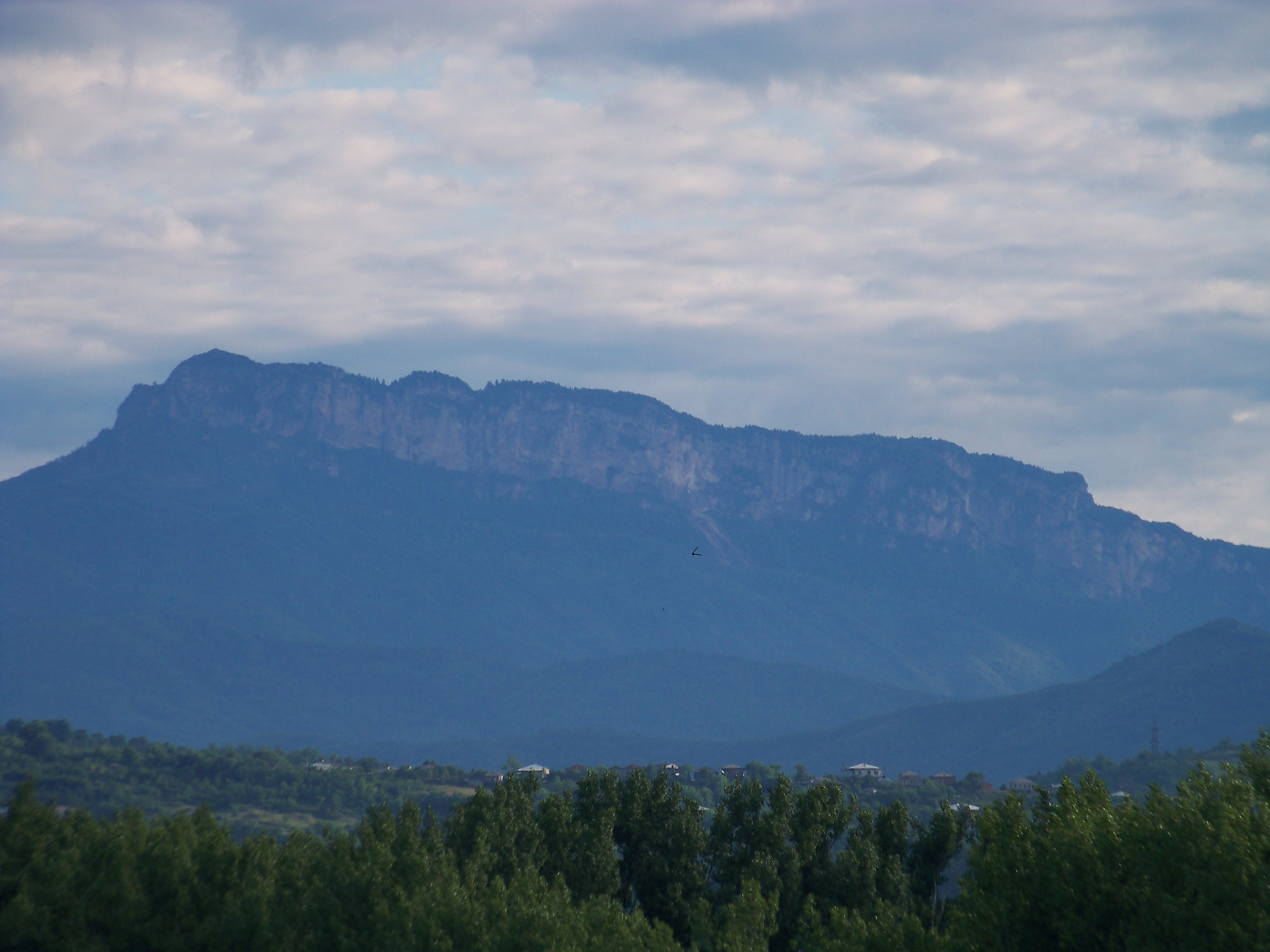

- Map highlighting the historical region of Lechkhumi in Georgia
- Country: Georgia
- Mkhare: Racha-Lechkhumi and Kvemo Svaneti
- Capital: Tsageri

Area
  - Total: 722 km^{2} (279 sq mi)

Population
  - Total: 17,000
  - Density: 24/km^{2} (61/sq mi)

Lechkhumi (Georgian: ლეჩხუმი [ˈle̞t͡ʃʰχumi]) is a historic province in northwestern Georgia which comprises the area along the middle basin of the Rioni and Tskhenistskali and also the Lajanuri river valley. Now part of the Racha-Lechkhumi and Kvemo Svaneti region, it corresponds roughly to the present day Tsageri district as well as parts of districts of Tsqaltubo and Ambrolauri. It is bordered by Mingrelia to the west, Svaneti to the north, Racha to the east, and Imereti to the south.

The area has been inhabited since the Neolithic Age and was later dominated by the so-called Colchian culture. The first recorded history of the area dates back to the early medieval period. The contemporary historic sources call the land Takveri, a name gradually being replaced by a term Lechkhumi. The province is usually identified with Scymnia mentioned by Procopius (sixth century AD) as a dependency of the Lazican kings . Within the unified Georgian feudal state (between the eleventh and fifteenth centuries), Takveri/Lechkhumi was subordinated consecutively to the dukes (eristavi) of Svaneti and Racha. On the breakup of the Kingdom of Georgia, the province came under the Kingdom of Imereti, 1455. Through incessant feudal warfare, the nobles from the Chikovani (Chikvani) family were eventual winners and established themselves as semi-independent Lords of Lechkhumi (Georgian: Lechkhumis Tavi). In 1714, Bejan Chikovani became Prince of Mingrelia and assumed the dynastic name of Dadiani. Thus, these two western Georgian polities united under the princes of Mingrelia.

King Solomon II of Imereti (1792-1810) attempted on several occasions, though unsuccessfully, to bring the area back under the Imeretian rule. The Russian Empire intervened on Mingrelian side that resulted in the fall of Solomon's kingdom and incorporation of Mingrelia into the Tsarist empire as an autonomous entity. In 1857, the Russian authorities abolished the Principality of Mingrelia and Lechkhumi became a part of Kutais Guberniya. Together with the neighbouring region Svaneti, it formed the Lechkhumi uyezd from 1867 to 1930, when the Tsageri Rayon was created.

== See also ==
- Khvamli
- History of Georgia
- Skvimnia
