= Khvamli =

Limestone massif in Georgia

Khvamli ხვამლი (Georgian) Khomli
- Massif
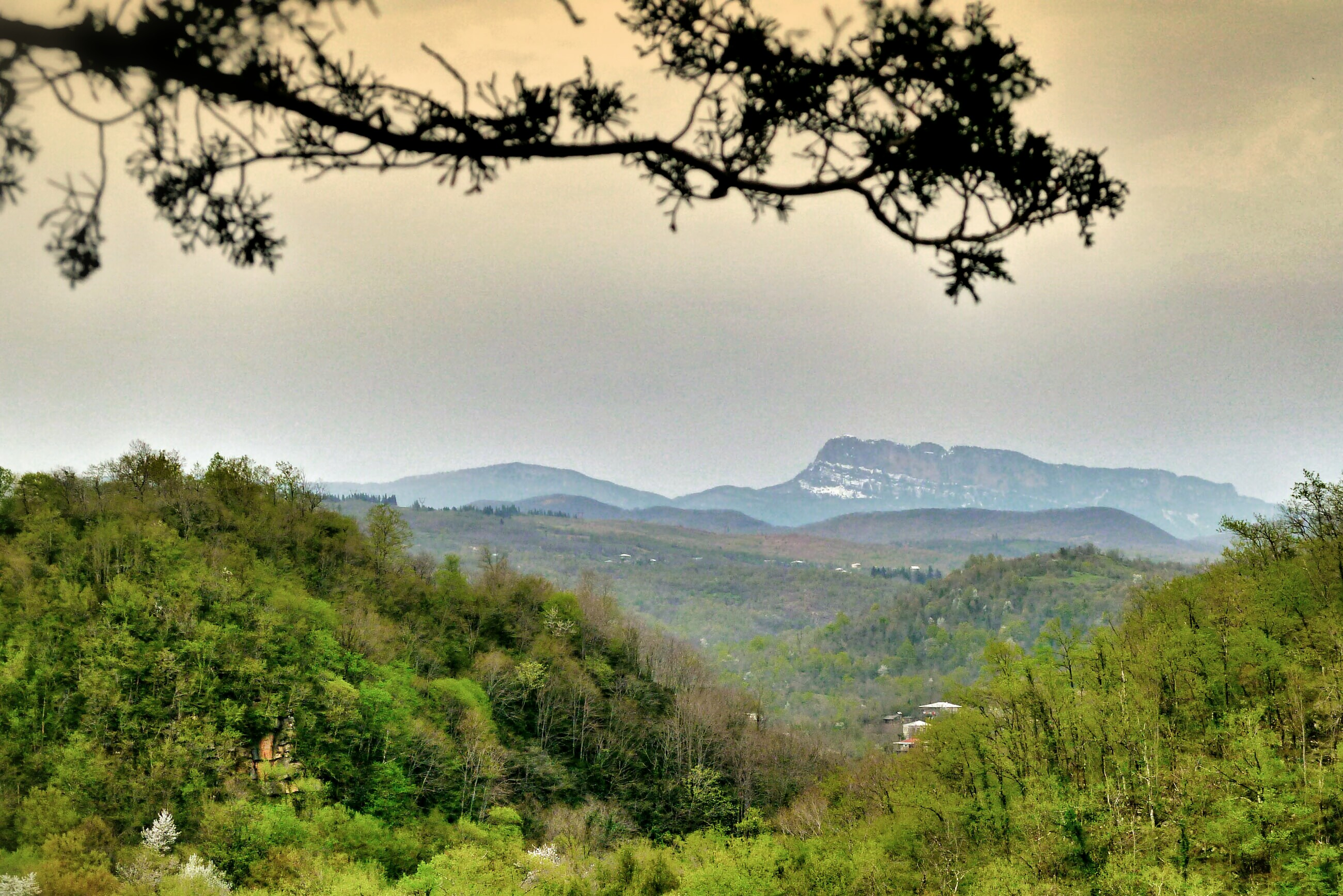
- The Khvamli massif as seen from the city of Kutaisi.

- Location within Imereti Location within Georgia
- Interactive map of Khvamli
- Coordinates: 42°30′03″N 42°42′54″E
- Location: Tsageri Municipality, Racha-Lechkhumi and Kvemo Svaneti and Tsqaltubo Municipality, Imereti, Georgia
- Geology: limestone

Khvamli (Georgian: ხვამლი) or Khomli (ხომლი) is a limestone massif in western Georgia, located on the territories of Tsageri and Tsqaltubo municipalities and forming the watershed division between the Rioni and Tskhenis-Tsqali river valleys. It stands at 2,002 metres (6,568 ft) and forms a double cuesta, consisting of Cretaceous limestone units and covered by mixed forests. It presents to the south a bluff face of 300 metres (984 ft) height. Both cuestas have a northward-facing scarp perforated by numerous sinkholes and caves. Most important of the caves is called Tekenteri (თეკენთერი) and has only one entrance—through the hollow of a large beech tree.

The caves of Khvamli feature in the 14th-century Georgian chronicle as the abode of treasures of the kings of Georgia. A local legend also makes Prometheus enchained to the bluffs of Khvamli, being perpetually tortured by a raven.

== Tekenteri cave ==
The Tekenteri cave is located at 1,400 metres (4,593 ft) above sea level. Its only entrance—the hole of a large beech tree—has no bottom but the karst sinkhole 18 metres (59 ft) deep, with a lake of cold, clean water. A water stream stemming from it flows through a horizontal passage to form a waterfall, judging by noises from the depths. There are many metal buckets and pitchers floating in the lake, suggesting that cave water had been used by locals for many years.

== History and culture ==
Khvamli is located in the western portion of the historical Georgian province of Lechkhumi. The name of Khvamli stems for an old Georgian word for a constellation and the rock, according to the 18th-century scholar Prince Vakhushti of Kartli, was named so because of its height.

The "royal treasures" (სამეფო საჭურჭლე, samep'o sach'urch'le) hidden in the caves of Khvamli (Khomli) is mentioned by the 14th-century anonymous Georgian Chronicle of a Hundred Years in connection with the division of the Kingdom of Georgia between the two cousins, David VI and David VII, during the period of the Mongol hegemony in 1259. The two Davids divided the lands and vassal nobles, but from the Khomli treasure only certain articles were taken, of which the share falling to David VI was "the famous chain of diamonds, the superb jewel cut in the form of an anvil and a great pearl, of which the like was never seen". Much of the treasure, the chronicle states, remained hidden in the caves. The 19th-century French historian Marie-Félicité Brosset reports that excavations made at Khvamli by Prince Dadiani in the 1840s yielded no result.

Khvamli also housed a church of St. George probably built in the 12th or 13th century, of which only ruins remain. Digs in 1910 revealed a medieval Georgian stone inscription recording the name of the church's donor, Ioane, eristavi ("duke") of the Svans.

Of a series of legends, the one identifying Khvamli as the site of punishment of Prometheus, or his local counterpart, Amirani, feature in some 19th-century European travel accounts and even found its way in Jules Verne's Kéraban the Inflexible, which mentions "the rock of Khomli, overlooking Koutais, to which Prometheus was bound, and where the vultures eternally feed upon his entrails as a punishment for having stolen the bolts of heaven". Another local legend explains the alternating course of the nearby Verdzistava spring with the movement of an immortal dragon living in the caves of Khvamli. There is also a holiday called Khvamloba celebrated in nearby villages on July 20.

Archaeological surveys of the Khvamli area in the 2000s was a focus of coverage by the Georgian media, which also ran stories about alleged Nazi and Soviet KGB covert operations in search of the Georgian royal treasure.

== Environmental issues ==
The territory of Khvamli is a protected area in Georgia and borders with the Tvishi dam, which is projected to serve the proposed Namakhvani Hydro Power Plant cascade. In 2011, environmental groups expressed fears that the project might have a negative impact on the Khvamli Planned Managed Reserve.
