= Tsageri =

Tsageri ცაგერი
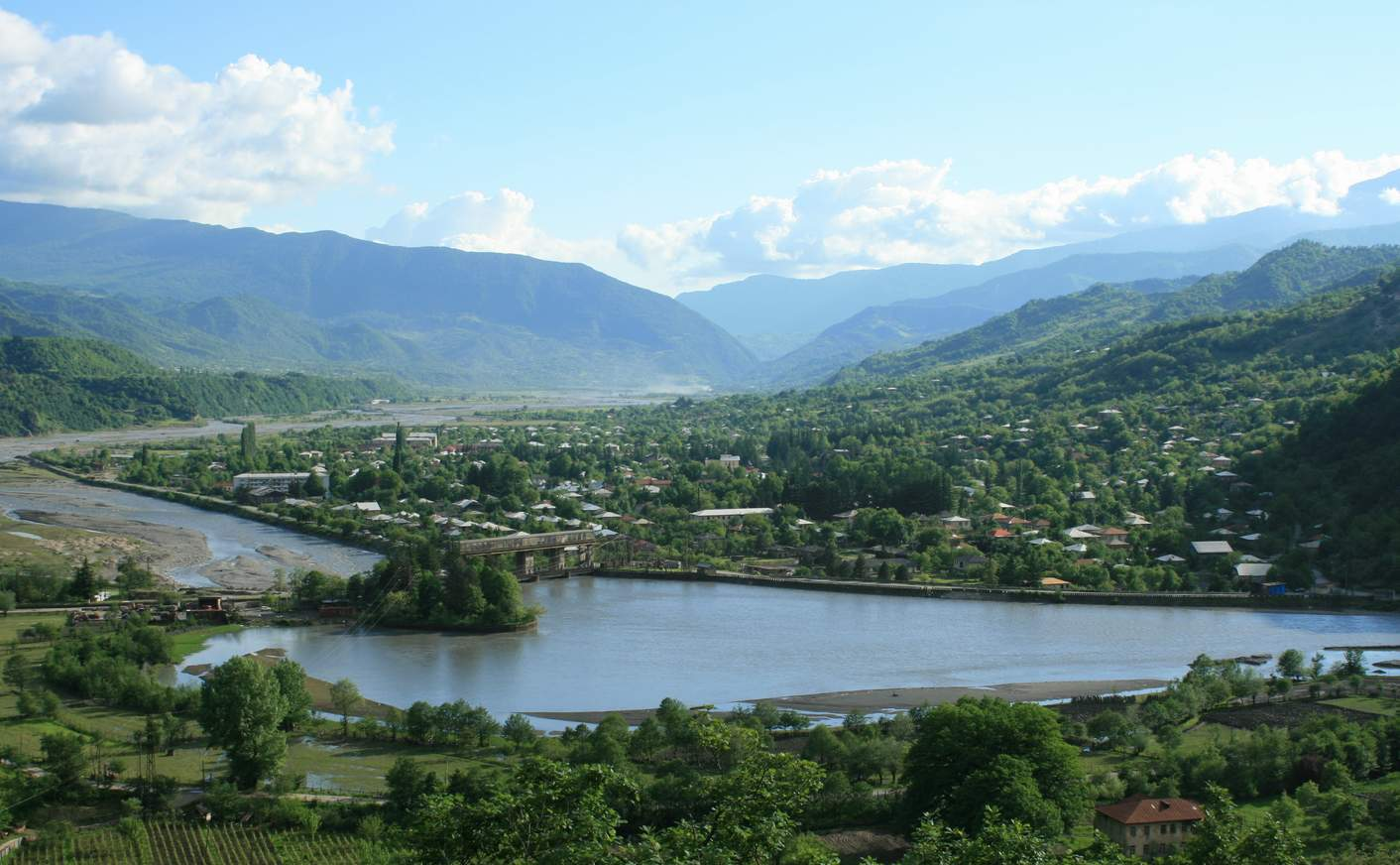
- Interactive map of Tsageri
- Location within Georgia Location within Racha-Lechkhumi and Kvemo Svaneti
- Coordinates: 42°38′50″N 42°46′12″E
- Country: Georgia (country)
- Mkhare: Racha-Lechkhumi and Kvemo Svaneti
- Municipality: Tsageri
- Elevation: 475 m (1,558 ft)

Population (2024)
  - Total: 1,028
- Time zone: UTC+4 (Georgian Time)

Tsageri (Georgian: ცაგერი [ˈt̪͡s̪ʰäge̞ɾi], Cageri) is a town in Georgia, located in Racha-Lechkhumi and Kvemo Svaneti region in the west of the country and serving as an administrative center of the homonymous district.

Tsageri is located at 475 m above sea level, on the right bank of the Tskhenis-Tsqali, an affluent of the Rioni river. As of the 2014 census, the town had a population of approximately 1,320, mostly Georgians.

== History ==
In medieval Georgia, Tsageri was an episcopal see, with a cathedral described by the early 18th-century geographer Vakhushti as "the cupola church of Tsageri, superbly built." The original three-nave basilica design was significantly altered by the cathedral's late 19th-century restorers; the original wall paintings, including the portraits of Queen Tamar and her son George IV, were also lost in the process.

Under the Russian Empire and early Soviet government, Tsageri functioned as an administrative center of the Lechkhumi Uyezd of the Kutaisi Governorate. It acquired the status of a town in 1968.

== Culture and religion ==
There is the residence of the Georgian Orthodox bishop of Tsageri and Lentekhi in Tsageri. A local museum exhibits several thousands of archaeological artifacts unearthed in Lower Svaneti and Lechkhumi.

In the vicinity of Tsageri, there are the ruins of the medieval fortress of Muris-Tsikhe which might have been the place of exile and death of the Christian theologian Maximus the Confessor (c. 580 – 662). There still exists a monastery dedicated to St. Maximus. The nearby located Khvamli caves, according to the medieval records, preserves the treasury of the kings of Georgia. It has been listed among the national monuments of Georgia and has recently attracted a renewed interest from scholars.
