= Racha-Lechkhumi and Kvemo Svaneti =

Region (mkhare) of Georgia

Coordinates: 42°38′N 43°08′E

Racha-Lechkhumi and Kvemo Svaneti რაჭა-ლეჩხუმი და ქვემო სვანეთი
- Mkhare (region)
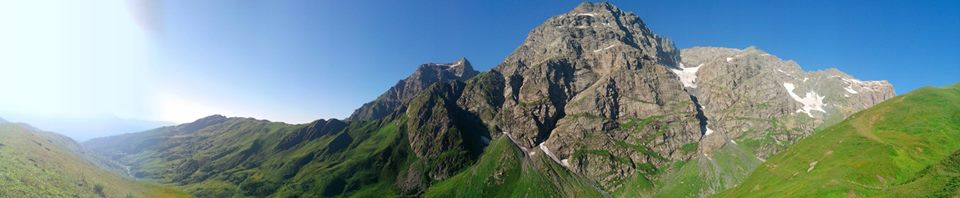
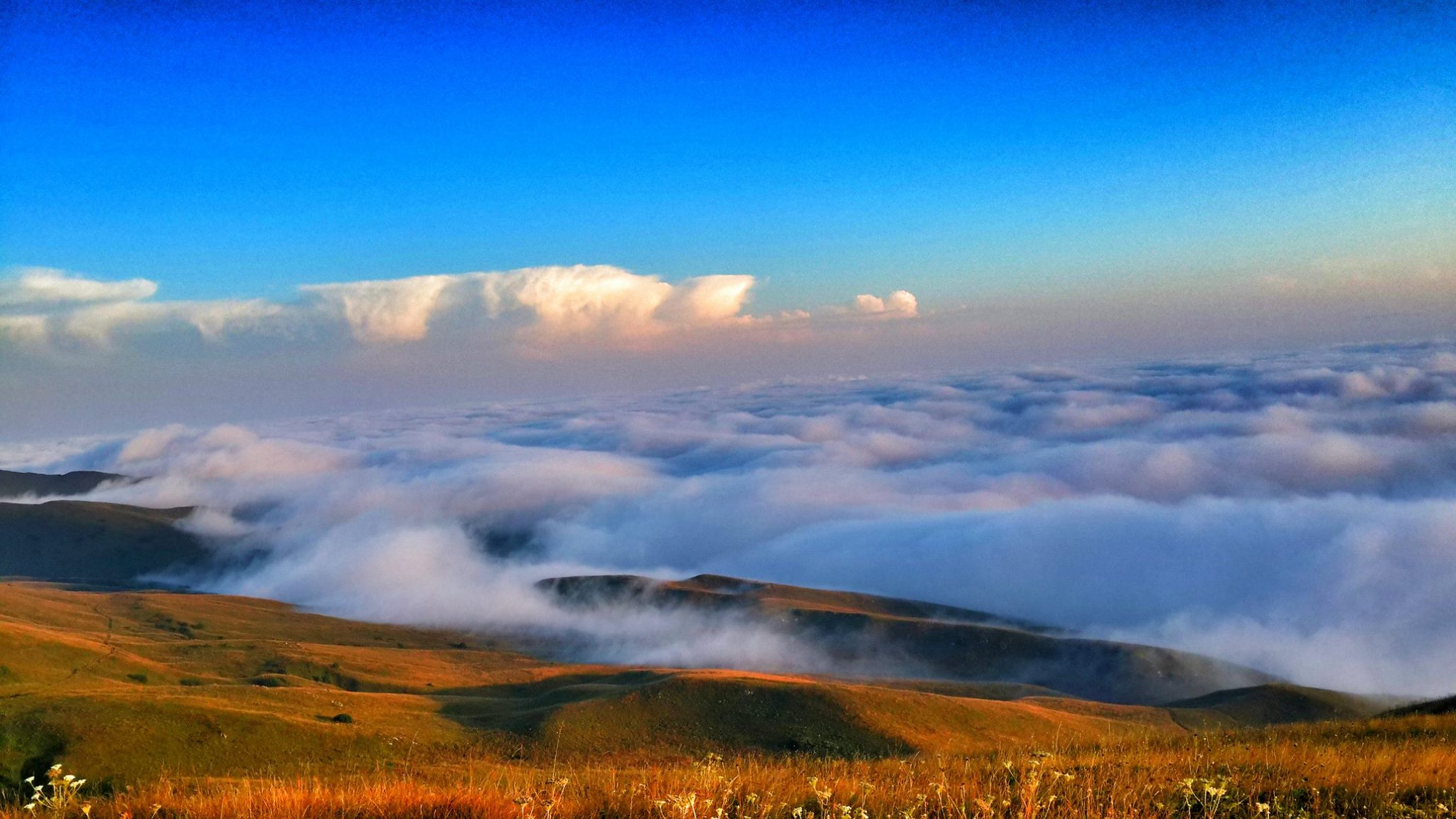
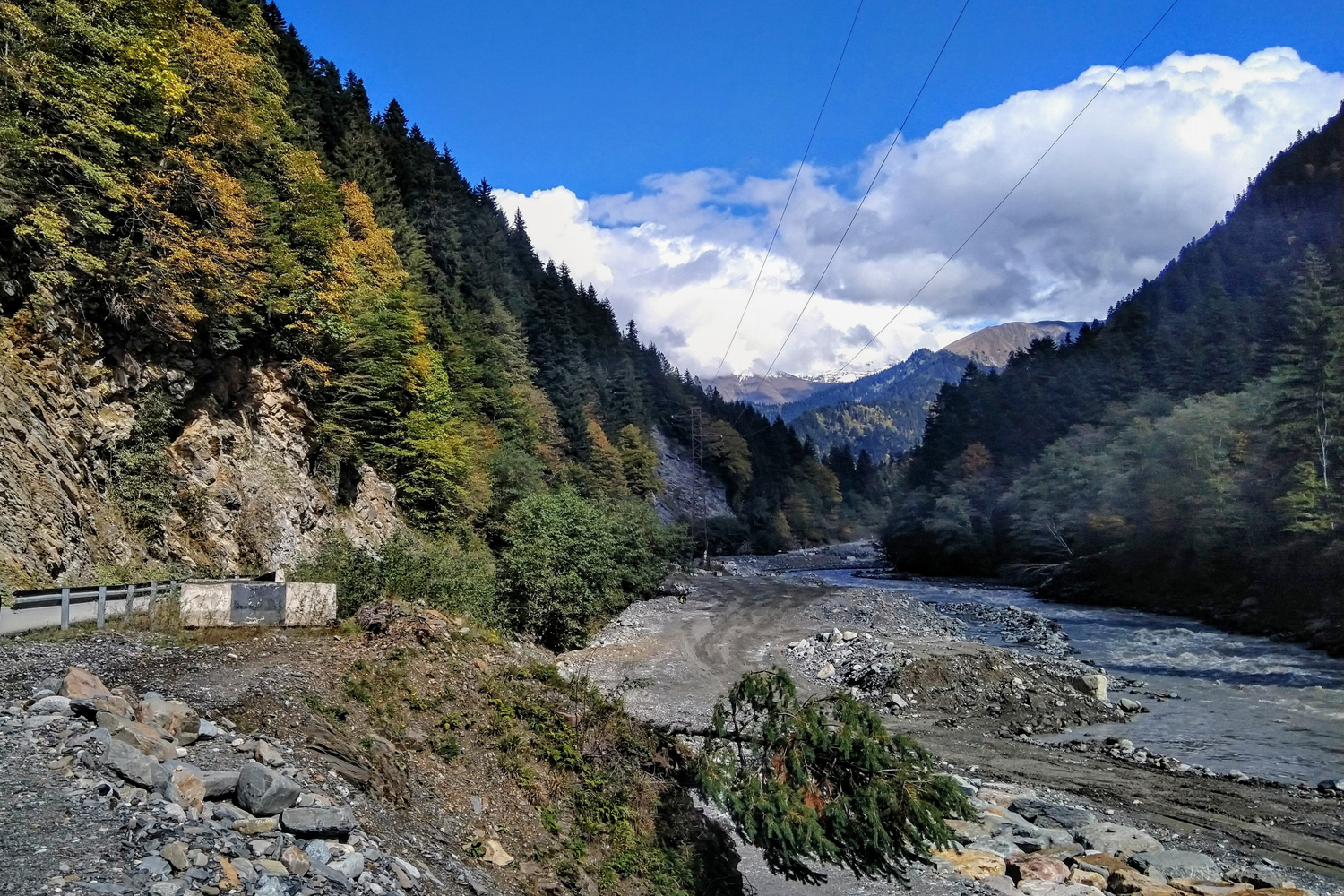
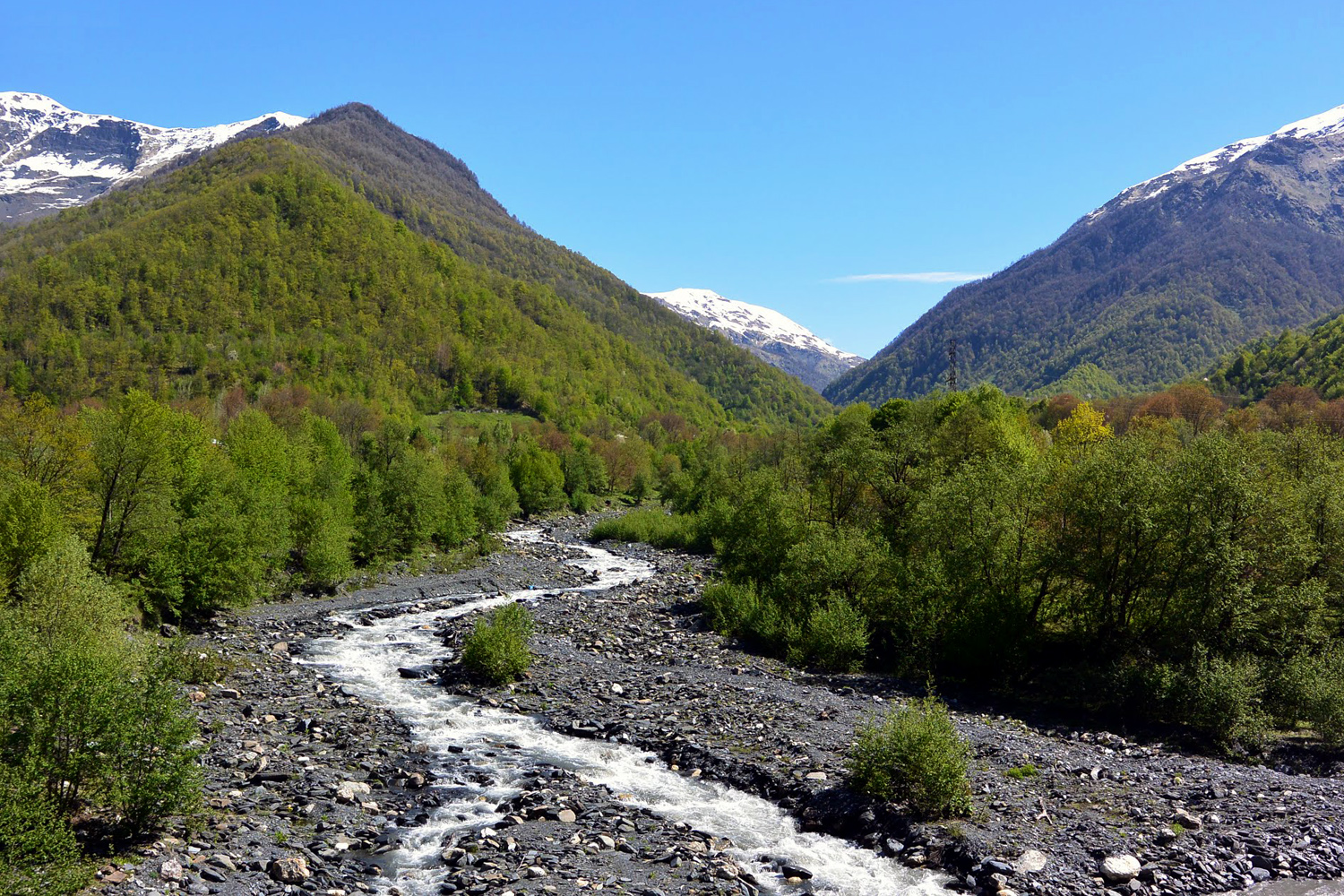
- From the top to bottom-right: Lechkhumi Mountain Range, Oni District, Rioni River, Kheshkuri River, Shaori Reservoir

- Overlapping borders of de jure Racha-Lechkhumi region and de facto Republic of South Ossetia (Note: South Ossetia's status is disputed. It considers itself to be an independent state, but this is recognised by only a few other countries. The Georgian government and most of the world's other states consider South Ossetia de jure a part of Georgia's territory.)
- Country: Georgia
- Seat: Ambrolauri
- Subdivisions: 4 municipalities

Government
  - Governor: Parmen Margvelidze

Area
  - Total: 4,954 km^{2} (1,913 sq mi)

Population (2021)
  - Total: 28,500
  - Density: 5.75/km^{2} (14.9/sq mi)

GDP (nominal, 2022)
  - Total: ₾ 373.7 million (€123 million)
  - Per Capita: ₾ 13,539 (€4,443)
- ISO 3166 code: GE-RL
- HDI (2023): 0.841 high · 3rd
- Website: rls.gov.ge

Racha-Lechkhumi and Kvemo Svaneti (Georgian: რაჭა-ლეჩხუმი და ქვემო სვანეთი, Rach’a-Lechkhumi da Kvemo Svaneti [ɾät͡ʃʼäle̞t͡ʃʰχumi d̥ä kʰʷe̞mo̞ s̪ʷän̪e̞t̪ʰi]) is a region (mkhare) in northwestern Georgia with a population of 28,500 (2021), making it the most sparsely populated region in the country. It has a nominal area of 4,954 km^{2} (1,913 sq mi), of which 4,600 km^{2} (1,800 sq mi) is de facto controlled by Georgia. The remainder is effectively under South Ossetian control. (Note: With the formation of mkhare (regions) in 1995, a small part of the former South Ossetian Autonomous Oblast was incorporated in the Racha-Lechkhumi and Kvemo Svaneti region. Since the 2008 Russo-Georgian War the Georgian central government lost effective control over South Ossetia.) The region has Ambrolauri as its administrative center and Parmen Margvelidze is governor of the region since June 2021. Racha-Lechkhumi and Kvemo Svaneti includes the historical provinces of Racha, Lechkhumi and Kvemo Svaneti (or Lower Svaneti).

== Geography ==
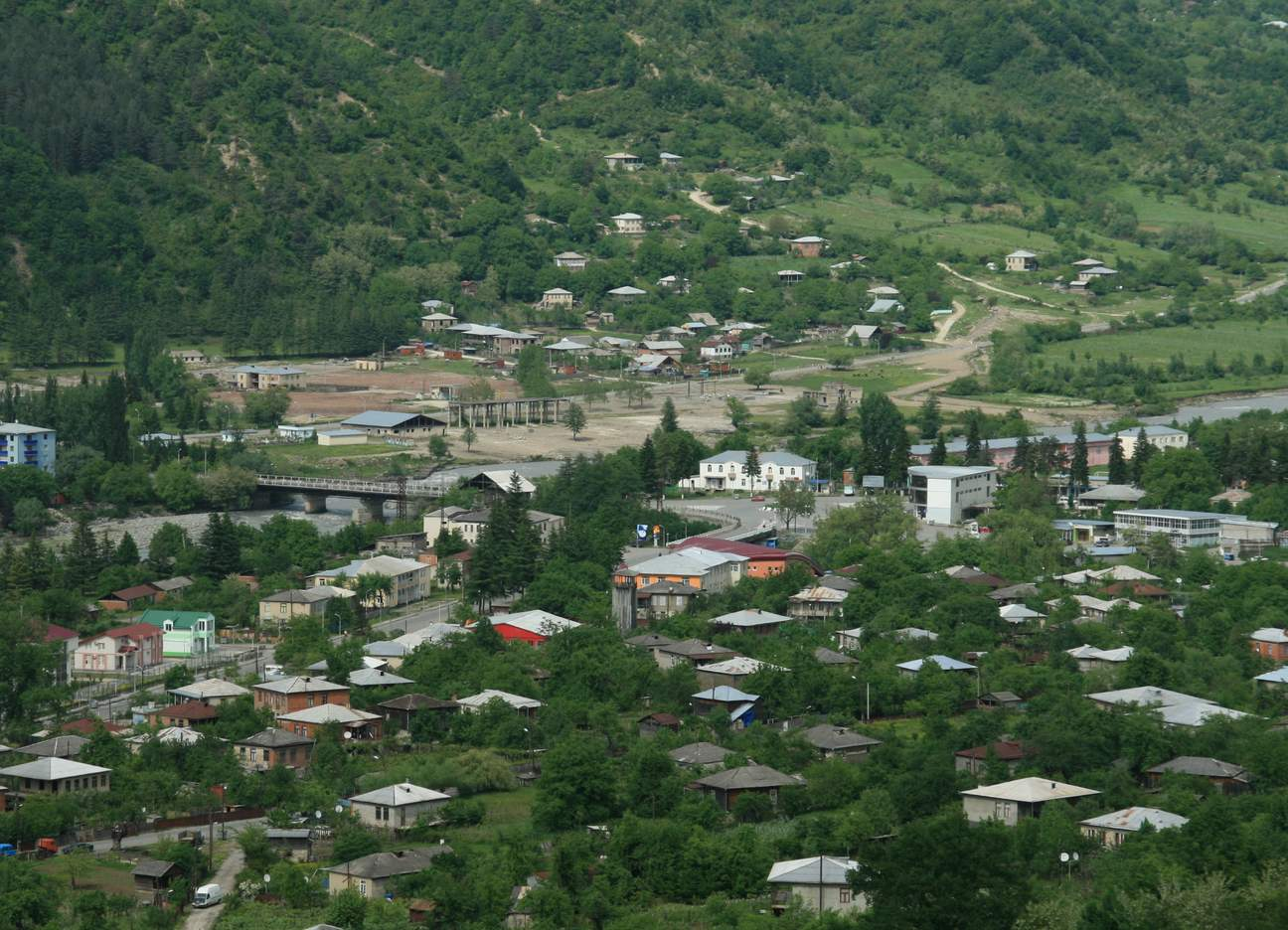
Ambrolauri, the administrative center and the second largest city of the region

Racha-Lechkhumi and Kvemo Svaneti is located in the north of Georgia and covers an area of 4,954 km^{2} (1,913 sq mi). The eastern tip of the region is de facto in South Ossetia and is not under Georgian control. This concerns approximately 354 km^{2} (137 sq mi). Racha-Lechkhumi and Kvemo Svaneti borders the Samegrelo-Zemo Svaneti region to the west, the Russian Caucasian republics of Kabardino-Balkaria and North Ossetia-Alania to the north, the Georgian Shida Kartli region to the southeast, and Imereti to the south. Racha-Lechkhumi and Kvemo Svaneti is traversed by the northeasterly line of equal latitude and longitude.

The region is surrounded by mountain ranges as a natural border. The north-south watershed and main ridge of the Greater Caucasus forms the natural northeastern boundary of Racha-Lechkumi and Kvemo Svaneti while the Racha Range form the southern boundary from the main ridge of the Greater Caucasus to the outlet of the region's Rioni and Tskhenistsqali rivers. To the west of this, the Egrisi Range forms the southwestern natural border and the Svaneti Range the northwestern. In addition, the region itself is also separated into separate areas by mountain ranges. The Shoda-Kedela Ridge, together with the Lechkhumi Range, form a natural division between the historical regions of Mountain-, Upper- and Lower Racha, Lechkhumi and Lower Svaneti. Upper and Lower Racha have their natural boundary in the kHidiskari Gorge in the Rioni River between the villages of Tsesi and Kmimsi.

The largest river entirely in Georgia, the Rioni, has its major origins in Racha-Lechkhumi and Kvemo Svaneti, more specifically in Mountain Racha in the Greater Caucasus main ridge northwest of the village of Ghebi at the 3779 meter high Mt Pasismta. The Tskhenistsqali, the sixth river of Georgia, which flows into the Rioni after 176 kilometers at Samtredia, also finds its origin in this region, like the Rioni at Mt Pasismta. Both rivers flow in opposite directions through the region and find their exit in the southwest corner through the Khvamli chalk massif.

== Subdivisions ==
The region has four municipalities with 62 administrative communities (temi) and a total of 256 populated settlements:

- Three cities: Ambrolauri, Oni and Tsageri.
- Two dabas: Kharistvala, Lentekhi
- Villages: 251

Map	Municipality	Area (km^{2})	Density (p/km^{2})
	Ambrolauri Municipality	1,142	9.1
	Lentekhi Municipality	1,344	3.0
	Oni Municipality	1,748	3.2
	Tsageri Municipality	755	11.3
Population density based on 2021 population. Municipality area

== Demographic ==
According to data from the National Statistical Bureau of Georgia, Racha-Lechkhumi and Kvemo Svaneti had 28,500 inhabitants as of January 1, 2021, a decrease of 11% from the 2014 census. Of these, 23.7% live in urban areas and 76.7% in rural villages. Racha-Lechkhumi and Kvemo Svaneti is the smallest region in Georgia in terms of inhabitants and has depopulated in a rapid pace, partly forced by limited economic prospects, especially in the hard to reach valleys deeper in the region.

Population development of the region Racha-Lechkhumi and Kvemo Svaneti
	1959	1970	1979	1989	2002*	2002**	2014	2021
Racha-Lechkhumi and Kvemo Svaneti	90,045	▼79,979	▼69,834	▼57,776	▼50,969	▼44,003	▼32,089	▼28,500
Ambrolauri Municipality	26,667	▼24,128	▼20,916	▼17,065	▼16,079	-	▼11,186	▼10,405
Lentekhi Municipality	14,692	▼13,479	▼12,963	▼11,227	▼8,991	-	▼4,386	▼4,027
Oni Municipality***	21,784	▼19,016	▼15,493	▼12,318	▼9,277	-	▼6,130	▼5,563
Tsageri Municipality	27,262	▼23,356	▼20,462	▼17,166	▼16,622	-	▼10,387	▼8,505
* Research after 2014 census showed the 2002 census was inflated by 8-9 percent. ** Corrected data based on retro-projection 1994-2014 in collaboration with UN *** Part of Oni is outside Georgian government authority and has not been counted since 2002.

=== Ethnic groups ===
The population of (Georgian controlled) Racha-Lechkhumi and Kvemo Svaneti consists almost entirely of Georgians. The 2014 census counted no more than 112 inhabitants belonging to a minority group, with ethnic Russians (29) and Ossetians (28) being the most represented. Others include Armenians, Ukrainians, and Greeks.

=== Religion ===
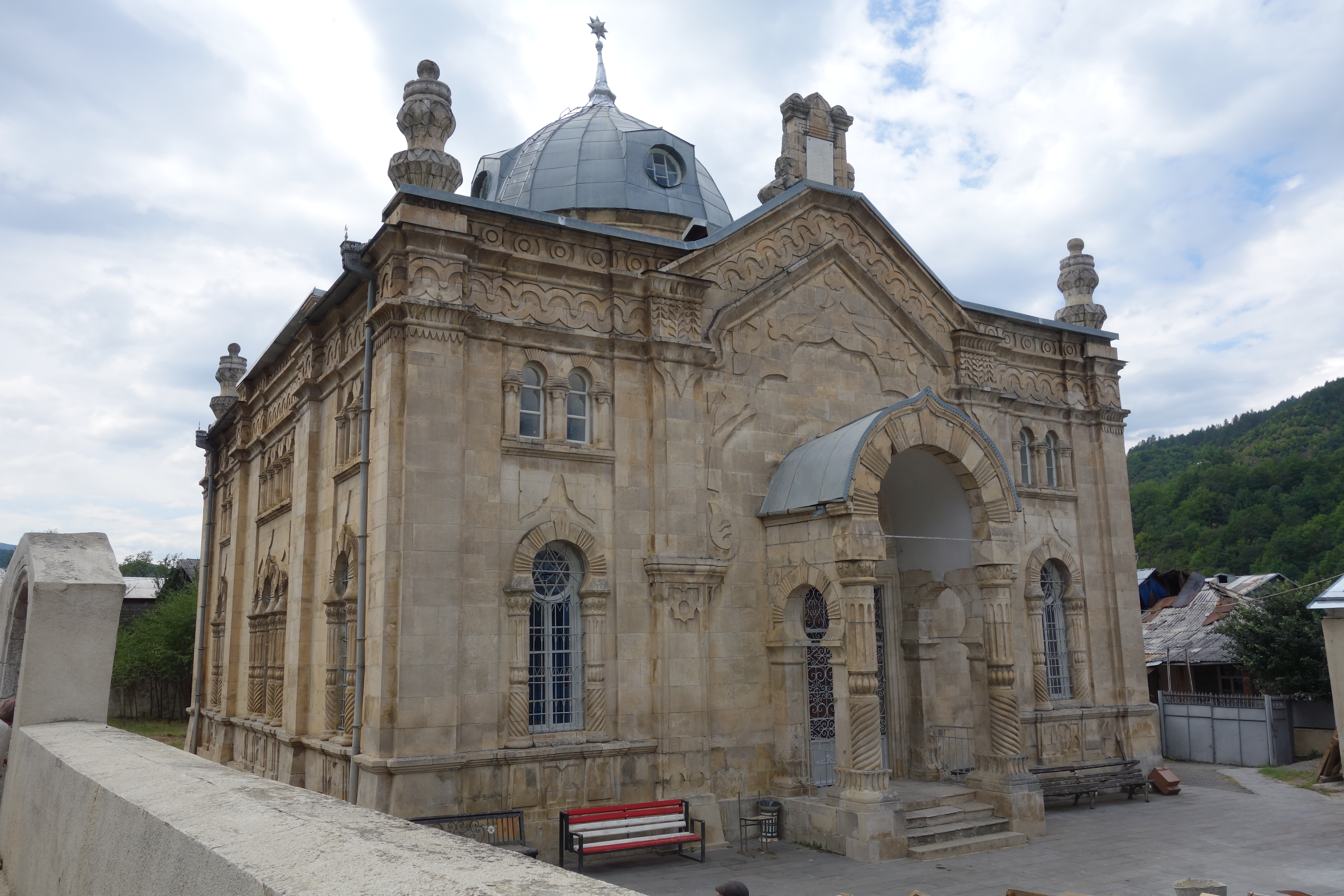
Oni Synagogue

The population of (Georgian controlled) Racha-Lechkhumi and Kvemo Svaneti almost entirely identifies themselves as Orthodox Christians, with only 90 people belonging to another religion. Jehovah's Witnesses are the most significant religious minority with 69 followers, according to the 2014 census, followed by s small number of Jews, Armenian Gregorians and Muslims.

Oni has long been one of the main centers of Georgian Jews. At its peak, the community is said to have been as large as 3,500 people. According to the census of the period 1920-1970, around 1,100-1,200 Jews lived in Oni. Migration to Israel, in particular, started from 1968 when the Soviet Union began to allow emigration. Under Foreign Minister Eduard Shevardnadze, this was made easier, accelerating the exodus in the late 1980s. By the early 1990s, most Jews had left Oni, especially to Beer Sheva in Israel's Negev desert. This town has had a twinning relationship with Oni ever since.

The synagogue in Oni is the third largest in Georgia, and was opened in 1895 after a 4-year construction period. The synagogue is inspired by the Great Synagogue in Warsaw (Poland). The rabbi of Oni saw this synagogue during a study in Warsaw and wanted a similar synagogue in Oni. He had a Polish design made in an eclectic style that also has references to synagogues in Tykocin and Krakow. It was built by Greek workers using limestone and rock. By 2021 the Jewish community in Oni is only 12 people small and it is difficult to keep the synagogue open. Services are only held if the attendance is at least 10.

=== Language ===
Georgian language is spoken by the entire population. The Svan language is also spoken in Kvemo Svaneti, mostly by the elders.

== History ==
=== Kvemo Svaneti ===
Svaneti in red

In early centuries, Svaneti was a part of Colchis, after it became a part of Egrisi. In the 11th-15th centuries, Svaneti was a Saeristavo of the Georgian Kingdom. After the break of the united kingdom, Svaneti was divided into different parts:

- Svanetis samtavro (Côté ouest de Zemo Svaneti)
- Balzemo Svaneti (Côté est de Zemo Svaneti)
- Kvemo Svaneti (Basse Svaneti)

=== Racha ===
Racha in red

In early period, Racha with Takveri was forming the Takveri Saeristavo which was part of Egrisi. After, with Lechkhumi which formed the Saeristavo of Racha-Lechkhumi. In the end of the 10th century, was created the Saeristavo of Racha. After the final abolishment of the Saeristavo, Racha became a part of Imereti and after the unification of Imereti with the Russian Empire, Racha became an okrug and an uyezd.

According to Prince Vakhushti of Kartli, a lot of noble families ruled Racha, including: the Tsulukidze, the Iashvili, the Japaridze, the Inasaridze and the Lashkhisshvili.

==== Saeristavo of Racha ====
In the 10th century, the Rachis Saeristavo, an territorial-administrative entity in the feodal Georgia was created. According to written sources, the first Eristavi was Rati from the Baghashi noble family. After the Eristavi became his son, Kakhaberi. The noble family Kakhaberisdze which was borne by the Baghashi's part who controlled Racha, comes from him. The Rachis Saeristavo was a very important entity in the Georgian Kingdom. Its Eristavis played important roles in the Georgian politics in the 10th-13th centuries. By north, Racha was bordered by Svanetis Eristavi. Their separator was the mountains of Lechkhumi. By west, it was separated with Takveri by Guelistavi

In the 10th-13th centuries, the Eristavis of Racha were the vassals of the King of Georgia. They were ordered to collect money, and to support the military. At this period, the main residence of the Eristavi was the Mindatsikhe.

In the end of the 13th century, Davit VI, cancelled the Saeristavo. The Kakheberisdze noble family, disappeared. In 1330, Giorgi V united Georgia and Racha entered as its component. Later, the Georgian kings restored the Saeristavo in Racha. At first, the title was borne by the Charelidze family, and since 1488, the Tsetidze. In the 15th century, after the break of the united kingdom, Racha was incorporated in Mingrelia.

In the 15th century, the king of Imereti, Bagrat III gave to the Eristavi of Racha, Mindatsikhe. The Eristavis had their own residential area in the gorge of the Lukhuni River. The main residence became Mindatsikhe.

In the 15th-17th centuries, the kings of Imereti owned lands in Racha. Their possessions were Khotevisa and Kvari tsikhe, Nikortsminda. Their summer residence was Shaori and Ambrolauri. After the death of the king Aleksandre III, the Eristavis of Racha were engaged in internal wars. Their wants were to expend their territory, to cancel the vassalage with Imereti and to gain independence.

In 1678, Shoshita (Eristavi) helped Archil II to take the throne. But after, Bagrat IV, helped by the Turks, re-gain the throne of Imereti. In 1679, the Turks invaded Racha. After the exil of Archil, in Russia, the Eristavis still fought with Imereti. Shoshita III restored ties with kings of Karti, especially with Vakhtang VI.

At first, Racha's Eristavis relied on Rachvelian nobles with the battle with the Kingdom of Imereti. The Allies, firstly, misappropriated the king of Imereti's proprieties : the Iashvili family took Kvaristsikhe, the Tsulukidze family took Khotevisa and the major parts of Imeretian possessions were taken by the Eristavi. In 1769, the Imeretian king Solomon I captured Rostomi (Eristavi) and his family, and the Rachis Saeristavo was cancelled. In 1784, the Saeristavo was restored by Davit (King of Imereti). Katsia II Dadiani, helped him to take the decision to restore the Saeristavo. ?He place as Eristavi, his nephew Anton which was badly saw by the Tsulukidze and Tsereteli.

In 1785, the king of Imereti, changed his mind and decided to place his father, Giorgi as Eristavi of Racha. Beri Tsulukidze and Papuna Tsereteli fled to Akhaltsikhe and in 1786, an army of 500 Laks and 1000 Turks broke down in Racha. The king of Imereti went to fight in Racha. At the final battle, on 26 January 1789, close to the village Skhvava, Davit win, but the Eristavi Giorgi died in 1787 during the battle. Anton was declared Eristavi. In 1789, in Imereti, Solomon II became king and abolished the Rachis Saeristavo.

=== Lechkhumi ===
Lechkhumi in red

In the region of Lechkhumi, human life can be traced back to the Neolithic period. During the Antiquity, the region was densely populated. In ancient sources, the region was called Sarkineti (სარკინეთი : Land of Iron); and during Lazica, it was called Skvimnia. In foreign sources, the region was first mentioned in the 6th century with the name of Skvimnia. Its long time centre is the city-fortress Tsageri. At this time, Skvimnia was gouvernated by an Eristavi under the king of Egrisi. The Skvimnians's (Lechkhumians) main occupation was agriculture. This region was well-knew for its wine and metallurgic centres. The Skvimnians played a large role in the future with the Rachvelians (Inhabitants of Racha) in the creation of Takveri and later with Rachvelians, political and cultural rapprochement with Imeretian (inhabitants of Imereti) and Kartlian (inhabitants of Kartli) kingdoms. This Colchian tribe was called Lechkhumians. In the 10th century, after the unification of the Kingdom of Abkhazia with the United Georgian kingdom, the region lost his self-gouverning status and was unified to Takveri, Racha and the Okribi regions. Later, Lechkhumi became independent. Its economic centre was in Laila. After the creation of the Kingdom of Imereti (15th century), Lechkhumi entered in the kingdom as a Royal Domain. Lechkhumi was the most little political unity in Western Georgia. But, there were many fortresses and during the wars, the warriors of Imereti were coming into the region and reinforced there against the invaders. Lechkhumi's gouvernant main prisons were called Muris Tsikhe. In the Rioni gorge, the roads from Imereti were protected by these Muris Tsikhe. Since the 17th century, in Lechkhumi, the want of independence appeared, titles were created such as Lechkhumis Tavi (Head of Lechkhumi). The Lechkhumians tired to create their own nobles. In this side, the Inasanidze were the most popular. Later, the whole region was under the Chikovani family. In 1714, after the Lechkhumi's dirigeant Bejan I Dadiani became the Mtavari of Mingrelia, Lechkhumi was attached to it, and was ruled by Dadiani's selected commander. The little region played a big role in the economical and military affairs of Odishi. In the 18th-19th centuries, the king of Imereti, Solomon II tried to capture the region, but failed. After the entrance of Mingrelia in the Russian Empire, an administrative and territorial unity was created on the Lechkhumian soil, the Uyezd of Lechkhumi.

== Transportation ==
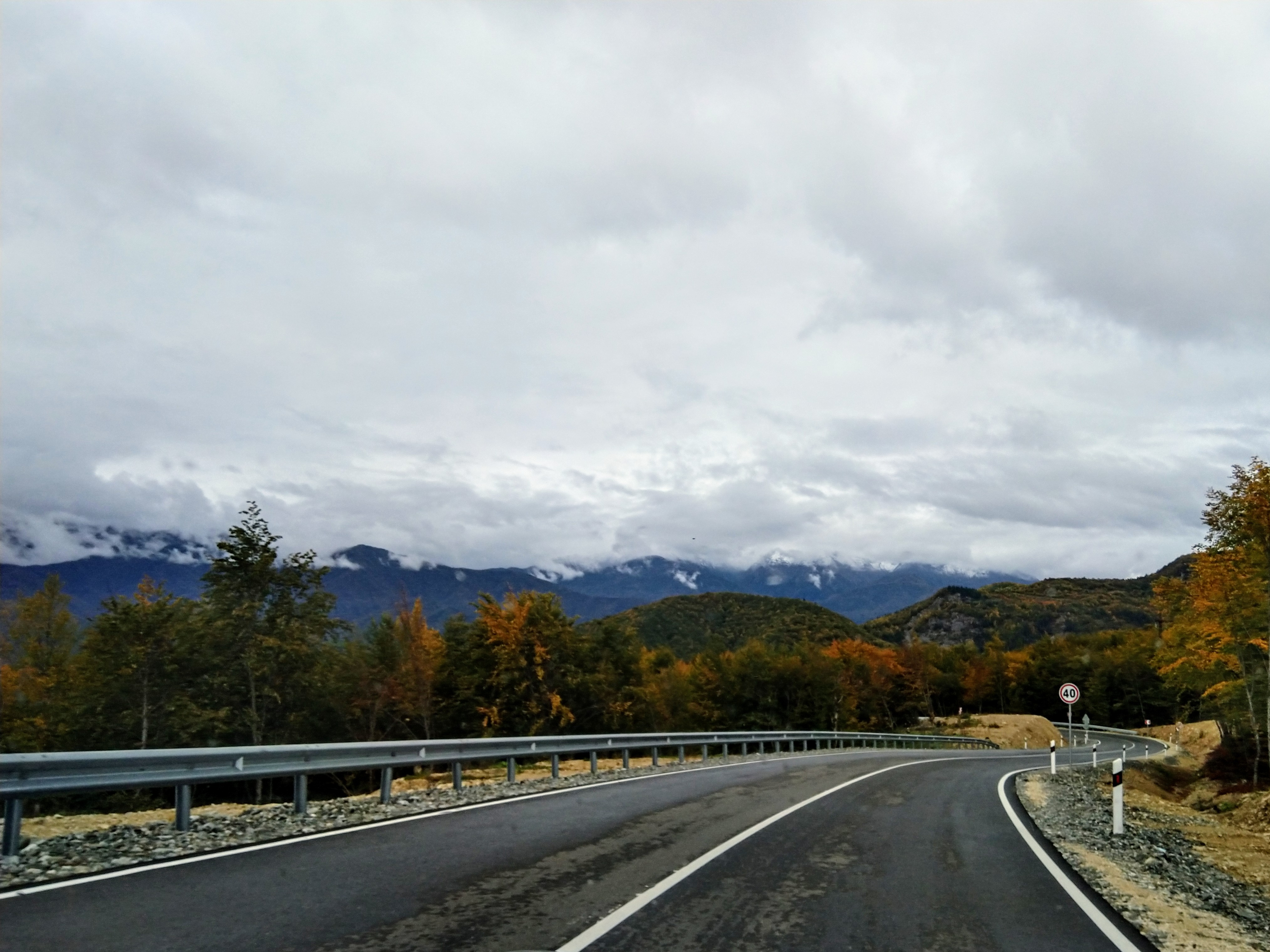
New Sachkhere - Oni road

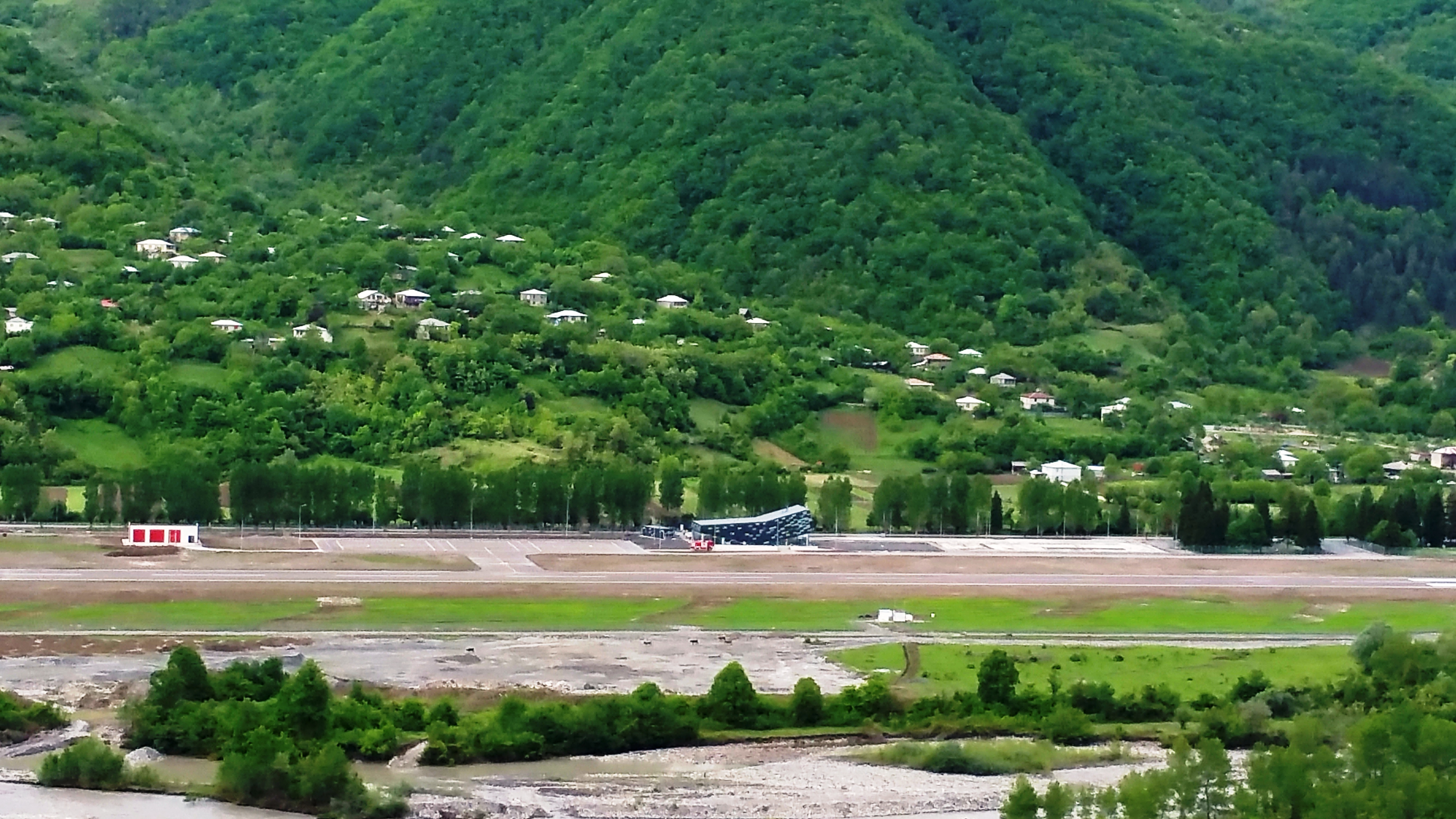
Ambrolauri Airport

The relatively isolated region is connected with neighbouring regions Samegrelo-Zemo Svaneti and Imereti through a limited set of national roads. The 157 km (98 mi) long national route Sh15 comes from Kutaisi and follows the Tskhenistsqali upstream via Tsageri and Lentekhi to Upper Svaneti and Mestia via the 2,620 m (8,600 ft) high Zagari pass. This is the vital artery through the western and northern area of the region. The 161 km (100 mi) long national route Sh16, which follows the Rioni upstream from Kutaisi, serves the southern and eastern part of the region and passes through Ambrolauri and Oni before ending at the 2,911 m (9,551 ft) Mamison Pass on the Russian border. There is no border crossing here. This road was also known as the Ossetian Military Road, originally constructed in the 19th century as an addition to the Georgian Military Road to connect South Russia with the Kutais Governorate. Furthermore, national route Sh17 connects Ambrolauri, the administrative center of the region, with central Georgia.

Since autumn 2021, a new road from central Georgia to Oni has been opened. It starts in Sachkhere (Imereti) and runs through the Racha Range] to the Oni-Ambrolauri road (Sh16), which significantly reduces travel time. This road reaches a highest point of almost 1,900 m (6,200 ft) meters above sea level and replaces the old route from Gori via Tskhinvali to Oni which has been effectively closed since the 1990s. A direct road between the towns of Lentekhi and Mestia in Upper-Svaneti via the Laskadura valley and a 6 kilometer long tunnel through the Svaneti Range has been announced several times, especially in election campaign times.

In 2017, an airport was opened in Ambrolauri to develop tourism and to serve the local population. Vanilla Sky Airlines operates flights between Ambrolauri and the regional airport of Natakhtari, which is close to Tbilisi. Since 1887, the nearest train station has been in Tkibuli (Imereti), the terminus of the line from Kutaisi.

== Economy ==
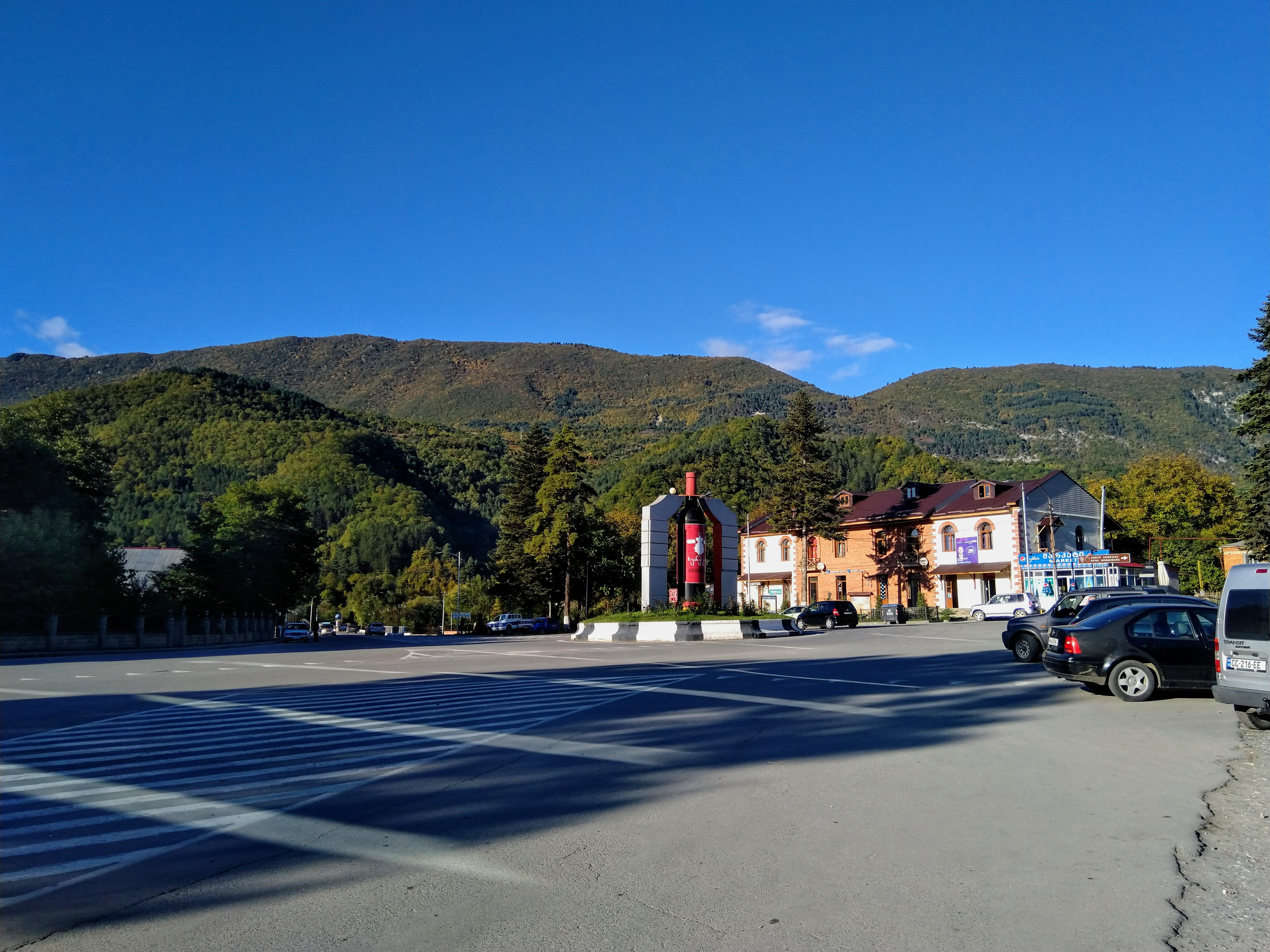
Bottle of Khvanchkara in Ambrolauri

The majority of the region is mountainous, while the economy mostly relies on agriculture from the valleys. In the region, cultivation of potatoes and viticulture and animal husbandry is mostly developed. The regional production's part in the GDP of Georgia is 0.6%, with a GDP of GEL 300m ($100m) in 2020.

The area around Ambrolauri is mostly known for its Khvanchkara wine production. Due to the protected climate, the Rioni valley is used for viticulture: the red wine Khvanchkara, popular in the former Soviet Union, is produced in this area. This is also reflected in the design of the coat of arms of the municipality. The namesake of the wine, which is a mixture of the Aleksandrouli and Mujuretuli grapes, is the village of Khvanchkara, which is located 12 km (7.5 mi) west of Ambrolauri.

== See also ==
- Racha, historic region abolished at the end of the 18th century
- Subdivisions of Georgia
