= Administrative divisions of Georgia =

Administrative divisions of Georgia may refer to:

- Administrative divisions of Georgia (country)
- Administrative divisions of Georgia (U.S. state)
