= Dzhoisubani Achaemenid seal =

Achaemenid cylindrical seal

Dzhoisubani Achaemenid seal refers to an Achaemenid cylindrical seal made out of striped agate which was found in 1962 by G. Gobeiishvili in the village of Dzhoisubani (Racha, Oni district) in the Georgian SSR of the Soviet Union (modern-day Georgia). The seal bears a depiction of the Tree of Life on its surface. A pair of winged, open-moutched lions are also shown at both sides of the Tree of Life. It probably dates to the 5th century BC or a little earlier. The style of the seal belongs to the so-called "Oriental Royal Style" (defined by John Boardman), which consists of cylinder and conical seals predominantly influenced by Assyrian and Babylonian elements. Artistically, the style of the seal portrayals bears similarities to Achaemenid palace monuments.
