= Lechkhumi Range =

Mountain range in the southwestern Caucasus Mountains, Georgia

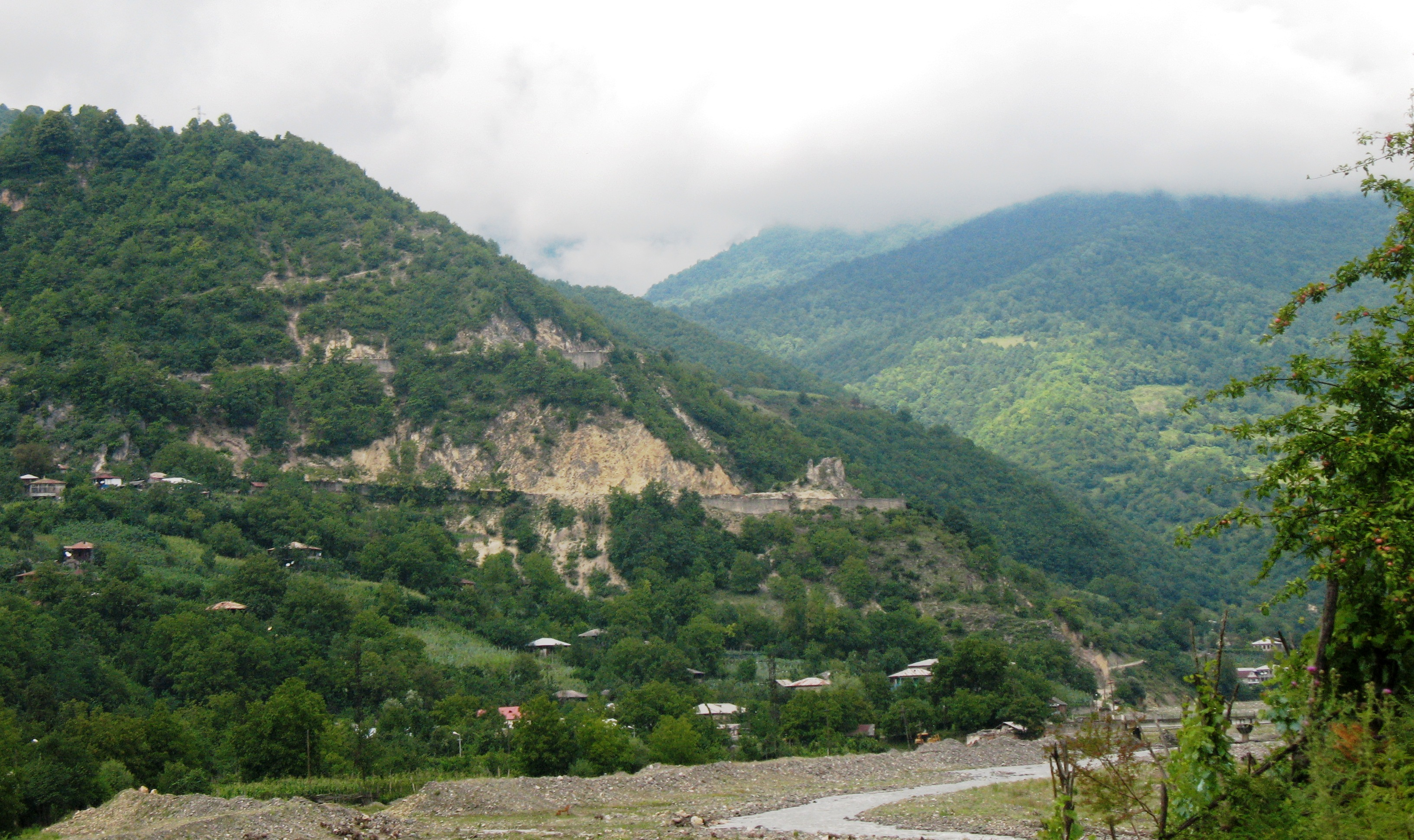

Highest point
- Peak: Samertskhle
- Elevation: 3,584 m (11,759 ft)

Dimensions
- Length: 66 km (41 mi)
- Width: 25 km (16 mi)

Geography
- Location within Georgia
- Country: Georgia
- Range coordinates: 42°42′16″N 43°09′20″E
- Parent range: Caucasus Mountains
- Borders on: Greater Caucasus

Lechkhumi Range (Georgian: ლეჩხუმის ქედი) is a mountain range in Georgia, a southern part of the Caucasus Mountains. The Lechkhumi range serves as a watershed, separating the Tskhenistsqali and Rioni river valleys.

The length of the ridge is 66 km and width is about 25 km. Its maximum height is 3584 metres (the peak of mountain Samertskhle).

Lechkhumi Range has a glacial landform, including U-shaped valley and Cirque. It is mainly composed of lower and middle Jurassic slates, sandstones and limestones. Lechkhumi Range encompasses 4 glaciers, which covered 2 km^{2}. It is mostly covered by oak, hornbeam, beech, spruce and fir. The highest part has alpine and subalpine landscapes.
