= Oni Municipality =

Coordinates: 42.5833°N 43.4500°E

Oni Municipality ონის მუნიციპალიტეტი
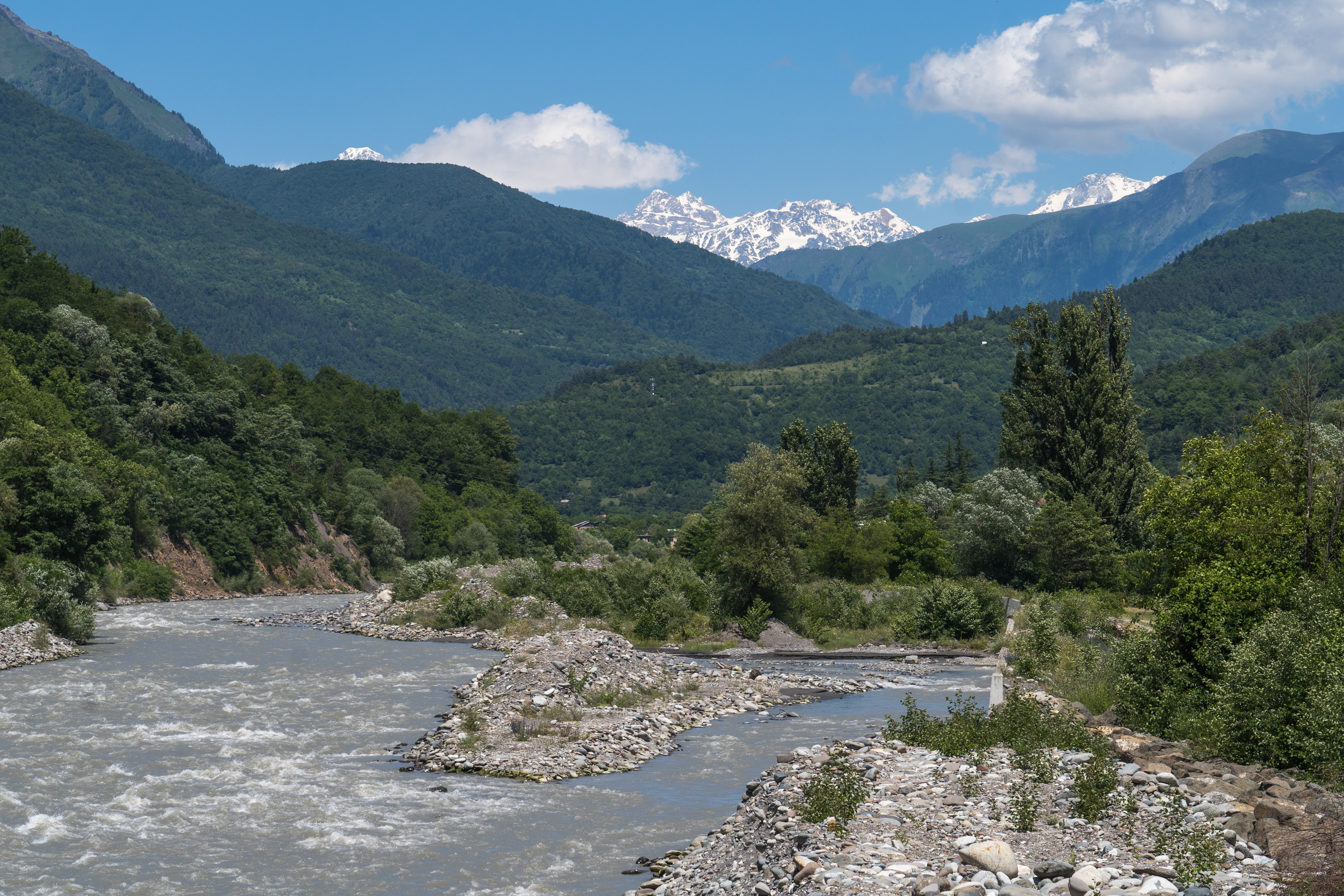

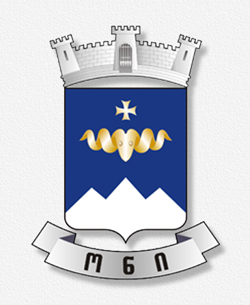
- Flag Seal

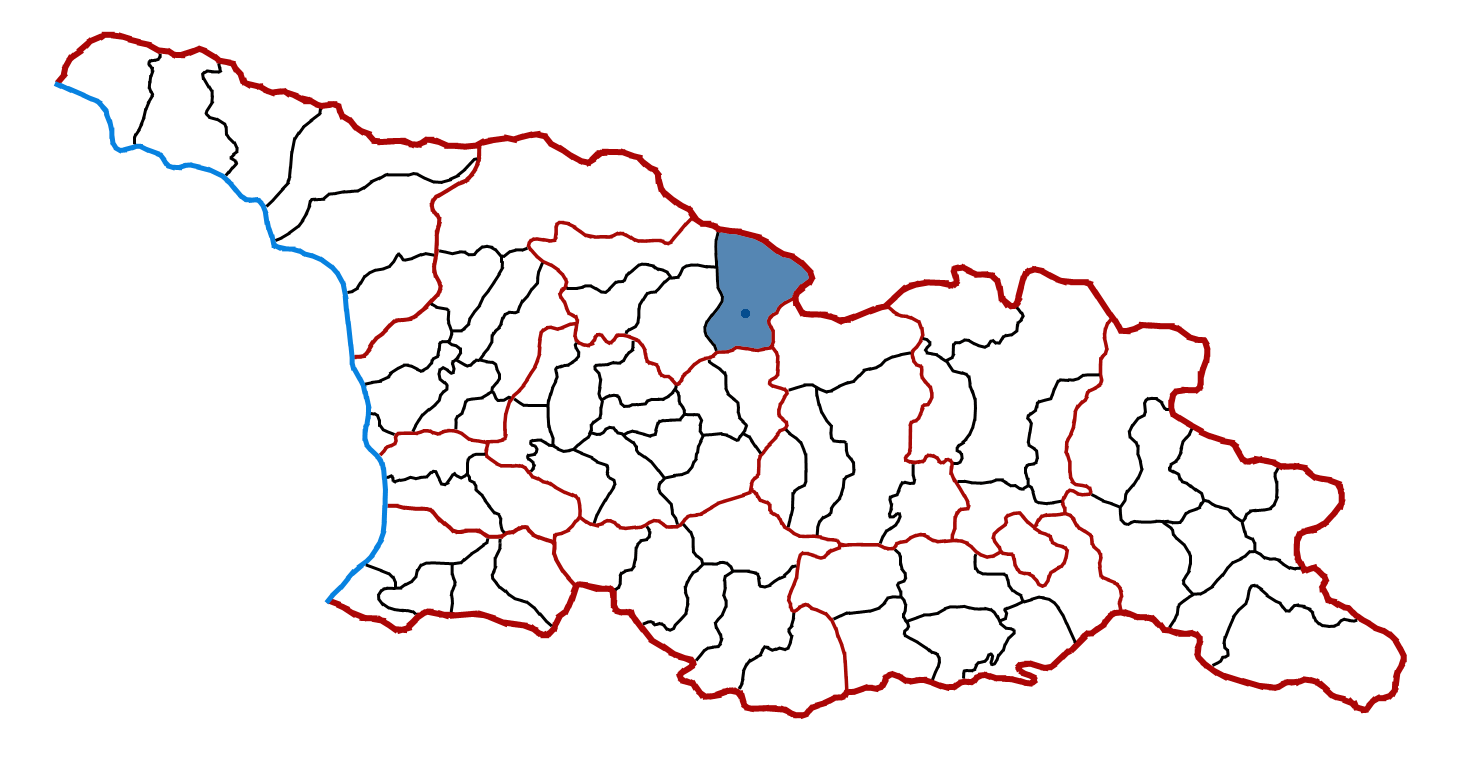
- Country: Georgia
- Mkhare: Racha-Lechkhumi and Kvemo Svaneti
- Capital: Oni

Government
  - mayor: Sergo Khidesheli (Georgian Dream)

Area
  - Total: 1,712 km^{2} (661 sq mi)

Population (2014)
  - Total: 6 130
- Time zone: UTC+4 (Georgian Time)

Oni (Georgian: ონის მუნიციპალიტეტი) is a district of Georgia, in the region of Racha-Lechkhumi and Kvemo Svaneti. Its main town is Oni.

== Geography ==
Oni Municipality borders Lentekhi Municipality to the northwest, and Ambrolauri Municipality to the west, both in the Racha-Lechkhumi and Kvemo Svaneti region. To the south Oni Municipality borders the Sachkhere Municipality in the Imereti region, and to the southeast de jure has a border with the Java Municipality in the Shida Kartli region. From the north to the east it is limited the Georgia–Russia border primerely with the Republic of North Ossetia-Alania and a short section with the Republic of Kabardino-Balkaria.

== History ==
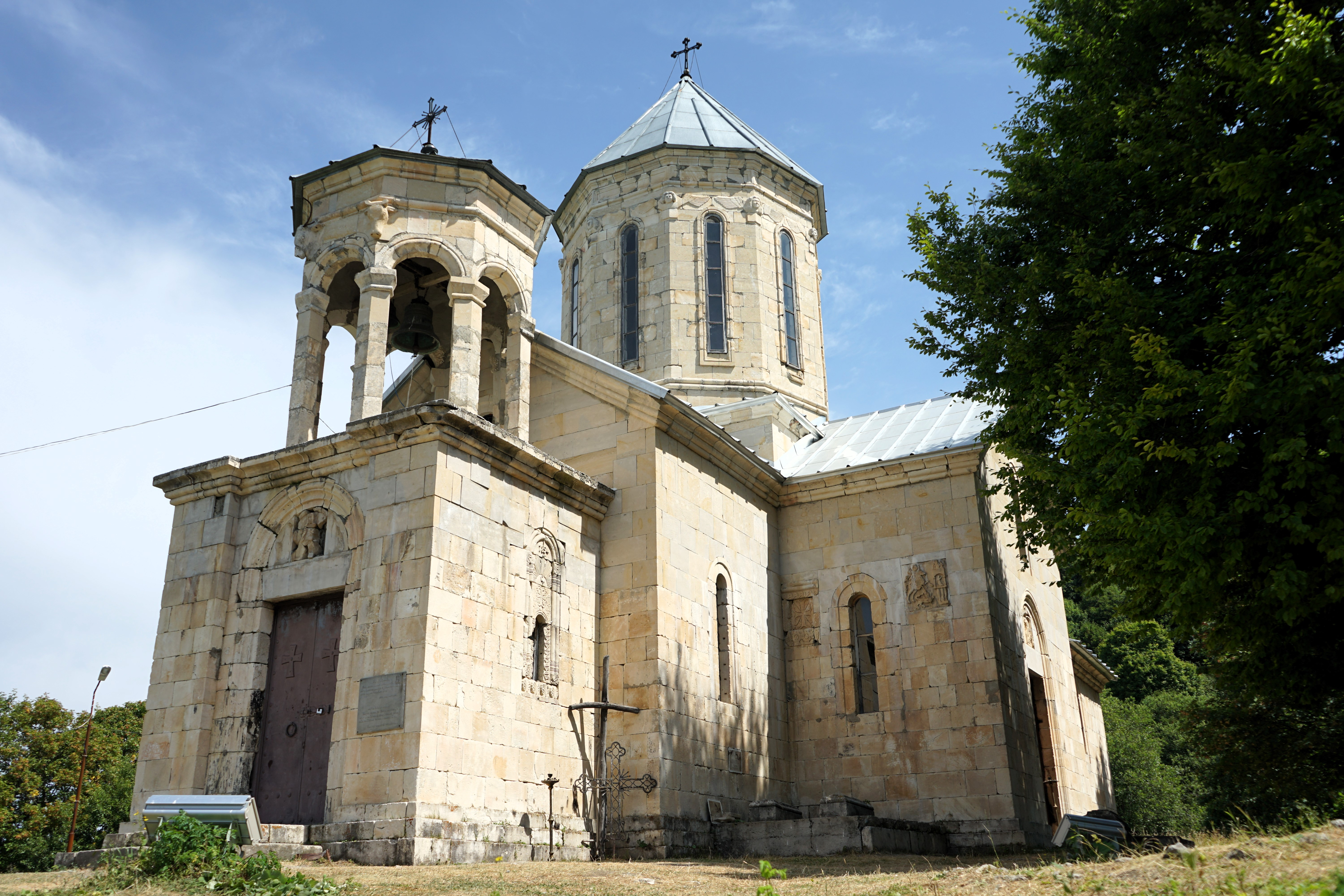
Mravaldzali, an 11th century Georgian Orthodox church in Oni Municipality

Until 1917, the actual Oni municipality was a part of the Racha uyezd in the Kutaisi Governorate, from 1917 to 1928 it was a part of Racha uyezd, from 1929, it was a part of Racha-Lechkhumi uyezd and from 1930, it became an independent rayon. In 1963–1964, it was a part of Ambrolauri Municipality. And became in 1965, an independent rayon. In 1991, it was unified with a part of Java Municipality but this part is actually occupied by separatists.

== Demographics ==
=== Population evolution ===
| Year | Population |
|---|---|
| 1989 | 12 318 |
| 2002 | 9 182 ▼ |
| 2014 | 6 130 ▼ |

Population Statistics for Oni Municipality (2015–2024)
| Year | Total Population (Thousands) | Urban (Thousands) | Rural (Thousands) | Change |
|---|---|---|---|---|
| 2015 | 6.2 | 2.7 | 3.5 | — |
| 2016 | 6.1 | 2.7 | 3.4 | ▼−0.1 (−1.61%) |
| 2017 | 6.0 | 2.7 | 3.3 | ▼−0.1 (−1.64%) |
| 2018 | 5.9 | 2.6 | 3.2 | ▼−0.1 (−1.67%) |
| 2019 | 5.8 | 2.6 | 3.2 | ▼−0.1 (−1.69%) |
| 2020 | 5.7 | 2.6 | 3.1 | ▼−0.1 (−1.72%) |
| 2021 | 5.6 | 2.5 | 3.1 | ▼−0.1 (−1.75%) |
| 2022 | 5.5 | 2.5 | 3.0 | ▼−0.1 (−1.79%) |
| 2023 | 5.4 | 2.4 | 3.0 | ▼−0.1 (−1.82%) |
| 2024 | 5.3 | 2.4 | 2.9 | ▼−0.1 (−1.85%) |

=== Ethnic groups ===
Ethnic Composition of Oni Municipality (2014 Census)
| Ethnicity | Percentage | Population |
|---|---|---|
| Georgian | 99.07% | 6,073 |
| Ossetian | 0.36% | 22 |
| Jewish | 0.20% | 12 |
| Russian | 0.10% | 6 |
| Armenian | 0.10% | 6 |

== Politics ==
Tsageri Municipal Assembly (Georgian: ცაგერის საკრებულო, Tsageri Sakrebulo) is a representative body in Tsageri Municipality, consisting of 30 members which is elected every four years. The last election was held in October 2021. Sergo Khidesheli of Georgian Dream was elected mayor.

| Party | 2017 | 2021 | Current Municipal Assembly |
|---|---|---|---|
| Georgian Dream | 27 | 22 | |
| United National Movement | 2 | 4 | |
| For Georgia | | 4 | |
| Lelo | | 2 | |
| Alliance of Patriots | 2 | 1 | |
| European Georgia | 1 | | |
| Development Movement | 1 | | |
| Total | 33 | 33 | |

== See also ==
- List of municipalities in Georgia (country)
