= List of municipalities in Georgia (country) =

A municipality (Note: Georgian: მუნიციპალიტეტი, romanized: municip’alit’et’i [munit͡sʰip’aɫit’et’i]) is a subdivision of Georgia, consisting of a settlement or community (თემი temi), which enjoy local self-government. A total of 69 municipalities are registered as of January 2019. Five municipalities are entirely located in breakaway Abkhazia and South Ossetia, and are effectively not governed by Tbilisi. The remaining 64 are divided over five self-governing cities (ქალაქი kalaki) and 59 self-governing communities.

== Background ==
The municipalities were first established in 2006. Most of them were successors to the earlier subdivisions, known as raioni (რაიონი), 'districts'. In addition, new municipalities were formed to govern those settlements in the disputed entities of Abkhazia and South Ossetia that at the time remained under Georgia's control. After the Russo-Georgian War of 2008, Georgia treats these municipalities as parts of its occupied territories. The former districts not under Georgia's effective sovereignty at the moment of the local government reform of 2006 were not transformed into municipalities. Rather, the laws of Georgia include a notion that the final mode of subdivision and system of local self-government should be established after the restoration of the state jurisdiction over the occupied territories. Each municipality is divided into administrative units (ადმინისტრაციული ერთეული), which can comprise one or several settlements.

The municipalities outside the two autonomous republics of Adjara and of Abkhazia and the capital city of Tbilisi are grouped, on a provisional basis, into nine regions: Guria, Imereti, Kakheti, Kvemo Kartli, Mtskheta-Mtianeti, Racha-Lechkhumi and Kvemo Svaneti, Samegrelo-Zemo Svaneti, Samtskhe-Javakheti, and Shida Kartli.

== List of municipalities as of 2019 ==

Regions, municipalities, and districts of Georgia
Municipality as of 2019	Corresponding district before 2006	Population (01.01.2021)
Georgia		3,728,573
Tbilisi, City of		1,202,731
Autonomous Republic of Abkhazia (Note: Territories in Abkhazia or South Ossetia outside of Georgia's control and defined by Georgia as "occupied territories".)		n.a. (Note: Official statistics are not available for the territories not under Georgia's control (Abkhazia and South Ossetia).)
1. Azhara (Upper Abkhazia) Municipality (Note: Temporary administrative-territorial unit, entirely located in South Ossetia or Abkhazia outside of Georgia's control. Defined by Georgia as "occupied territories". Municipal body formally in Tbilisi.)		n.a.
—	Gagra	n.a.
—	Gali	n.a.
—	Gudauta	n.a.
—	Gulripshi	n.a.
—	Ochamchire	n.a.
—	Sokhumi	n.a.
Autonomous Republic of Adjara		354,905
1. Batumi, City of		172,063
2. Keda Municipality	Keda District	16,700
3. Kobuleti Municipality	Kobuleti District	71,843
4. Khelvachauri Municipality	Khelvachauri District	52,737
5. Khulo Municipality	Khulo District	26,626
6. Shuakhevi Municipality	Shuakhevi District	14,936
Region of Guria		107,101
1. Chokhatauri, Municipality of	Chokhatauri District	17,851
2. Lanchkhuti Municipality	Lanchkhuti District	29,893
3. Ozurgeti Municipality	Ozurgeti District	59,357
Region of Imereti		481,473
1. Kutaisi, City of		134,378
2. Baghdati Municipality	Baghdati District	18,363
3. Vani Municipality	Vani District	21,241
4. Zestaponi Municipality	Zestaponi District	55,142
5. Terjola Municipality	Terjola District	31,427
6. Samtredia Municipality	Samtredia District	43,448
7. Sachkhere Municipality (Note: Municipalities which include at least some settlements in South Ossetia outside of Georgia's control that are defined by Georgia as "occupied territories".)	Sachkhere District	34,848
8. Tkibuli Municipality	Tkibuli District	17,898
9. Tsqaltubo Municipality	Tskkaltubo District	46,803
10. Chiatura Municipality	Chiatura District	38,231
11. Kharagauli Municipality	Kharagauli District	18,571
12. Khoni Municipality	Khoni District	21,123
Region of Kakheti		309,578
1. Akhmeta Municipality	Akhmeta District	28,853
2. Gurjaani Municipality	Gurjaani District	51,814
3. Dedoplistskaro Municipality	Dedoplis Tskaro District	20,677
4. Telavi Municipality	Telavi District	55,113
5. Lagodekhi Municipality	Lagodekhi District	41,152
6. Sagarejo Municipality	Sagarejo District	52,335
7. Sighnaghi Municipality		29,177
8. Qvareli Municipality	Qvareli District	30,457
Region of Mtskheta-Mtianeti		93,389
1. Akhalgori Municipality	Akhalgori District	n.a.
2. Dusheti Municipality	Dusheti District	26,328
3. Tianeti Municipality	Tianeti District	10,274
4. Mtskheta Municipality	Mtskheta District	53,006
5. Kazbegi Municipality	Kazbegi District	3,781
Region of Racha-Lechkhumi and Kvemo Svaneti		28,500
1. Ambrolauri Municipality	Ambrolauri District	10,405
2. Lentekhi Municipality	Lentekhi District	4,027
3. Oni Municipality	Oni District	5,563 (Note: Official statistics available only for those parts of the municipalities that are controlled by Georgia.)
4. Tsageri Municipality	Tsageri District	8,505
Region of Samegrelo-Zemo Svaneti		308,358
1. Poti, City of		41,536
2. Abasha Municipality	Abasha District	19,560
3. Zugdidi Municipality	Zugdidi District	99,542
4. Martvili Municipality	Martvili District	31,495
5. Mestia Municipality	Mestia District	9,447
6. Senaki Municipality	Senaki District	34,315
7. Chkhorotsku Municipality	District	21,361
8. Tsalenjikha Municipality	Tsalenjikha District	23,296
9. Khobi Municipality	Khobi District	27,806
Region of Samtskhe-Javakheti		151,110
1. Adigeni Municipality	Adigeni District	16,092
2. Aspindza Municipality	Aspindza District	10,587
3. Akhalkalaki Municipality	Akhalkalaki District	41,026
4. Akhaltsikhe Municipality	Akhaltsikhe District	39,463
5. Borjomi Municipality	Borjomi District	24,998
6. Ninotsminda Municipality	Ninotsminda District	18,944
Region of Kvemo Kartli		437,347
1. Rustavi, City of		130,072
2. Bolnisi Municipality	Bolnisi District	56,036
3. Gardabani Municipality	Gardabani District	80,329
4. Dmanisi Municipality	Dmanisi District	20,922
5. Tetritsqaro Municipality	Tetritsqaro District	22,485
6. Marneuli Municipality	Marneuli District	107,824
7. Tsalka Municipality	Tsalka District	19,679
Region of Shida Kartli		254,081
1. Gori Municipality	Gori District	120,569
2. Kaspi Municipality	Kaspi District	41,795
3. Kareli Municipality	Kareli District	40,689
4. Khashuri Municipality	Khashuri District	51,028
5. Eredvi Municipality		n.a.
6. Tighva Municipality		n.a.
7. Kurta Municipality		n.a.
—	Java District	n.a.

Notes

Georgian administrative divisions with Russian-occupied territories (Abkhazia and South Ossetia) shown in pink.

== See also ==
- List of cities and towns in Georgia
- Occupied territories of Georgia
- Administrative divisions of Georgia
