= Eredvi Municipality =

Eredvi Municipality ერედვის მუნიციპალიტეტი
- Municipality
- Flag Coat of arms

- Country: Georgia
- Region: Shida Kartli
- Established: 07.12.2006

Government
  - Mayor: Vladimer Khinchegashvili

Area
  - Total: 1,352 km^{2} (522 sq mi)

Population (2002)
  - Total: 8,334
  - Density: 6.164/km^{2} (15.97/sq mi)
- Time zone: UTC+4

Eredvi Municipality (Georgian: ერედვის მუნიციპალიტეტი) (formerly Eredvi Community) is a temporary administrative-territorial unit located in eastern Georgia, within the territory of Gori Municipality. The municipality was established in 2006. The territorial bodies of Arcevi, Beloti, Eredvi, Vanati, and Ksuisi were included in Eredvi Municipality. The administrative center of the municipality is the village of Eredvi. Since 2008, it has been occupied by the Russian Federation.

== History ==
Until 1917, the territory of Eredvi Municipality was part of the Gori district in the Tiflis Governorate. From 1917 to 1924, it was within the Gori district. From 1924 to 1991, it was part of the Tskhinvali district of the South Ossetian Autonomous Oblast. From 1991 to 1993, it was part of the Gori district in the Shida Kartli region. From 1993 to 2006, Eredvi Community was an independent entity, and since 2006, it has been a municipality (on May 10, 2007, the South Ossetian Administration was established).

Based on decree No.2304-rs issued by the President of Georgia, Mikheil Saakashvili, on December 16, 2005, Georgia's districts were reorganized, transforming the existing districts into municipalities. The date of registration as a taxpayer for the LEPL "Eredvi Municipality" (ID 218065055) is November 17, 2006, and the registration date is December 7, 2006.

In August 2008, the entire operational territory of Eredvi Municipality was occupied by the armed forces of Russia, resulting in 8,334 people becoming displaced in their own homeland. The population was resettled in 22 compact settlements for internally displaced persons across different regions of Georgia. The administrative bodies of the municipality are now located in Tbilisi.

== Geography ==
Eredvi Municipality is located in the territory of Shida Kartli and covers an area of 645 square kilometers. It is bordered by Akhalgori Municipality to the east, Java Municipality to the north, Gori Municipality to the south, and Tskhinvali and Kurta Municipalities to the west.

== Economics ==
The leading branches of agriculture in Eredvi Municipality include animal husbandry, beekeeping, fruit growing, horticulture, grain crops, and viticulture. Additionally, the municipality's territory is known for the extraction of volcanic ash, tuff-lava, pumice, and slag.

== Culture ==
After the 2008 Russo-Georgian war, many churches, monasteries, fortresses, and fortifications in Eredvi Municipality came under the control of occupying forces.

- St. George's Church of Geri: This church is built on one of the mountain peaks of the Gudisi range at an altitude of 1400 meters above sea level, in the village of Geri. It is considered one of the largest and most significant shrines in Shida Kartli and Georgia as a whole. The church, constructed in the 6th century, is a notable cultural and historical site.
- St. George's Church of Arbo: This church, associated with the St. George shrine in Geri, is a significant religious site in the region.
- St. George's Church of Eredvi: A three-aisled basilica typical of Georgian architecture, this church dates back to 906. The architect was Teudore Taflaisdze. The church, along with its surrounding walls, suffered significant damage from Russian air attacks.
- St. George's Monastery of Beruli: Built in the 10th century, this monastery is historically significant. The famous Georgian writer and public figure Ilia Chavchavadze wrote "Gandegili," about the life of the monk Favlenishvili, who worked here.
- St. Elias's Church of Beruli: Constructed in the 14th century, this church is another important cultural monument.
- Beruli Mtskheti Cross Church: Dating back to the 16th-17th centuries, this church is a significant historical site.
- Church of the Archangel of Ikorti: Located on the edge of the village of Ikorti, on Mount Kalatze, this Georgian Orthodox temple was built in 1172. Its facades and dome throat are richly carved. The temple is the burial site of Bidzina Cholokashvili, leader of the 1659 Kakheti rebellion, as well as Shalva and Elizbar Ksani.
- Church of the Resurrection of Disevi: Built in the 10th century, this church is an important historical monument.
- Church of the Holy Mother of Kulbiti: This historical monument dates back to the late Middle Ages. In the second half of the 19th century, the temples of Disevi and Kulbiti were restored by Bishop Alexander.
- Beloti Castle: This 18th-century fortification and cult building is located in the village of Beloti on the right bank of the Patara Liakhvi River. Initially belonging to the Eristavs of Ksani, it later became the property of Yulon Batonishvili.
- Vanati Castle: A medieval fortress located in the village of Vanati on the left bank of the Patara Liakhvi River. It is situated on a high mountain, inaccessible from three sides. Prince Vakhushti of Kartli provides detailed information about this castle.
