= List of Georgian regions by Human Development Index =

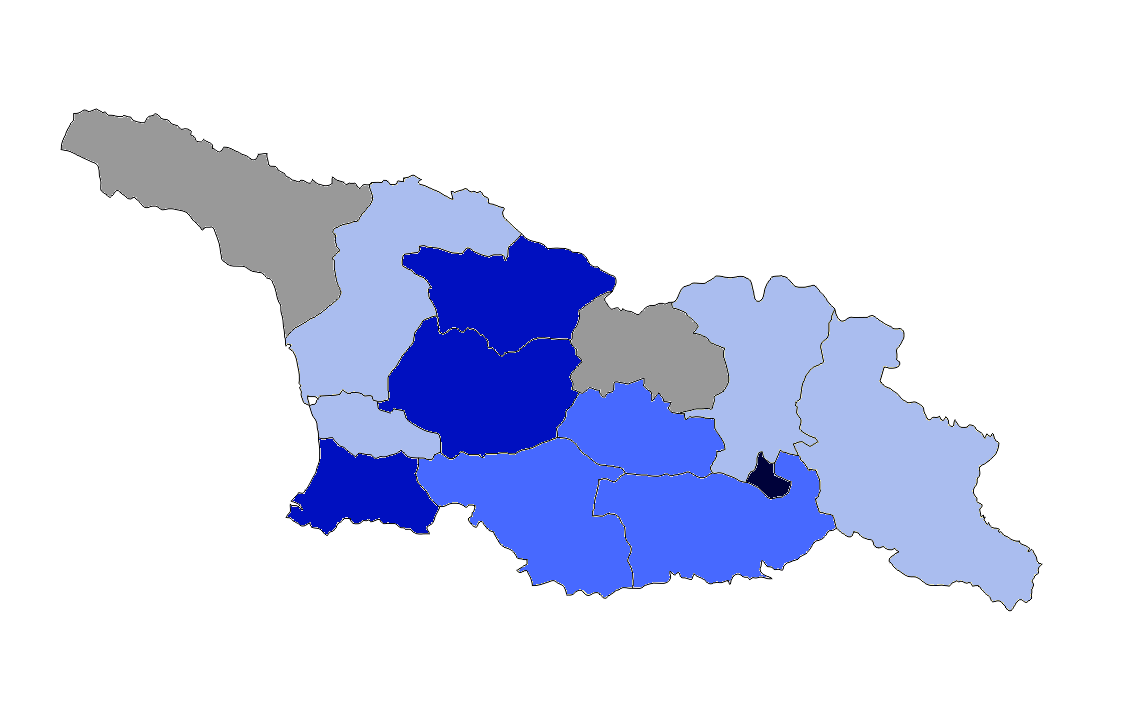
Map of the Georgian regions by Human Development Index in 2023. Legend: >0.870 0.840 – 0.870 0.810 – 0.840 0.780 – 0.810 No data

This is a list of Georgian administrative divisions (mkhare) by Human Development Index as of 2023. This also includes Adjara, a historical, geographic and political-administrative region of Georgia, and Tbilisi, the capital and largest city. There is no data for the Autonomous Republic of Abkhazia available.

Rank	Region	HDI (2023)
Very high human development
1	Tbilisi	0.876
2	Adjara	0.848
–	Georgia	0.844
3	Imereti, Racha-Lechkhumi and Kvemo Svaneti	0.842
4	Kvemo Kartli	0.825
5	Shida Kartli	0.820
6	Samtskhe-Javakheti	0.816
7	Samegrelo-Zemo Svaneti	0.805
High human development
8	Guria	0.799
9	Kakheti	0.797
10	Abkhazia (2022)	0.787
11	Mtskheta-Mtianeti	0.785
12	South Ossetia (2022)	0.778

== Development 2000-2019 ==
Human Development Index of Georgian regions since 2000
Region	HDI 2000	HDI 2005	HDI 2010	HDI 2015	HDI 2019	Increase 2000–2019
Tbilisi	0.779	0.817	0.815	0.825	0.832	▲6.3%
Adjara	0.701	0.737	0.760	0.793	0.814	▲13.8%
Georgia	0.702	0.738	0.759	0.790	0.810	▲13.3%
Imereti, Racha-Lechkhumi and Kvemo Svaneti	0.686	0.722	0.749	0.785	0.808	▲15.4%
Kvemo Kartli	0.656	0.691	0.723	0.764	0.791	▲17.0%
Shida Kartli	0.667	0.702	0.729	0.764	0.787	▲15.2%
Samtskhe-Javakheti	0.663	0.698	0.725	0.760	0.783	▲15.3%
Samegrelo-Zemo Svaneti	0.679	0.716	0.732	0.757	0.773	▲12.1%
Guria	0.697	0.734	0.741	0.757	0.767	▲9.1%
Kakheti	0.679	0.714	0.728	0.750	0.765	▲11.2%
Mtskheta-Mtianeti	0.669	0.704	0.717	0.739	0.757	▲11.6%
