= Lentekhi =

Lentekhi ლენტეხი
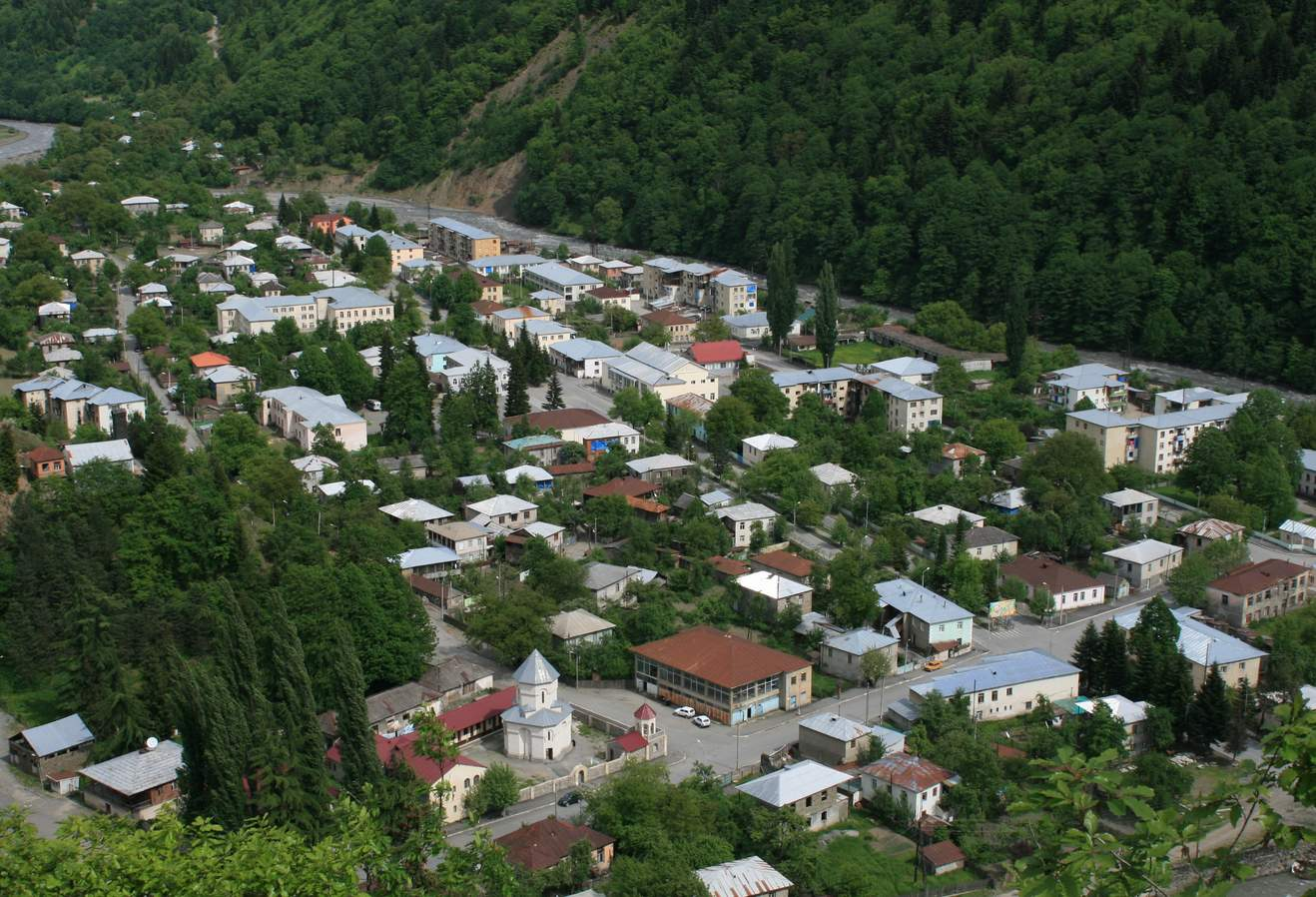
- Interactive map of Lentekhi
- Location within Georgia Location within Racha-Lechkhumi and Kvemo Svaneti
- Coordinates: 42°47′20″N 42°43′25″E
- Country: Georgia
- Mkhare: Racha-Lechkhumi and Kvemo Svaneti
- District: Lentekhi
- Elevation: 760 m (2,490 ft)

Population (2014)
  - Total: 947
- Time zone: UTC+4 (Georgian Time)
- Climate: Cfb

Lentekhi (Georgian: ლენტეხი, Georgian pronunciation: [le̞n̪tʼe̞χi]) is a small town and Lentekhi District's (Raion) capital in Georgia's western region of Racha-Lechkhumi and Kvemo Svaneti, 323 km northwest to the nation's capital Tbilisi. Situated on the southern slope of the Central Caucasus, the district is a site of alpinism.

== History ==
Lentekhi ethnographically belongs to a historic Georgian province of Lower, or Kvemo Svaneti. Cultural heritage of the area includes several monuments, particularly St George's Church of Jgëræg (the 10th century), the Archangel Church of Thargizel (the 9–10th centuries), Tekal Church (the 10–11th centuries), Lentekhi Castle of the Dadiani, and the famous Svanetian towers in the village of Leksuri.

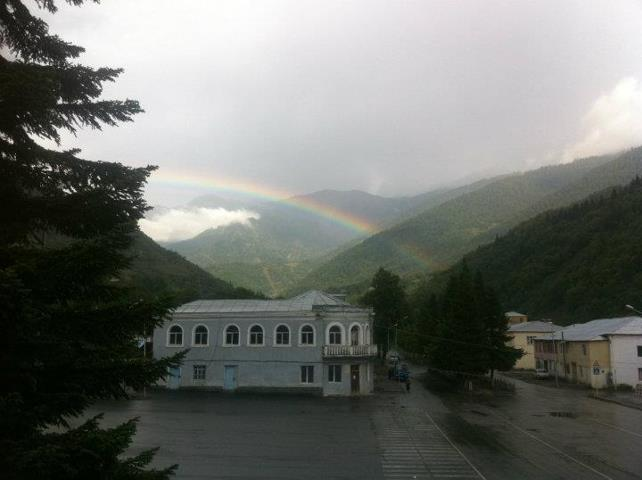

There is a river that goes through the town and its inhabitants survive largely off of farming and lumber, though in recent years government restrictions have slowed this latter industry. Like in much of Georgia, tourism is seen as the future source of income as the weather in lower Svaneti is not as severe and Lentekhi is one of the larger towns before arriving in Mestia. Nevertheless, as in much of Svaneti, there has been a tendency for the younger generation to migrate to the larger cities or to find work overseas for economic reasons.

Every spring, there is a festival at the church high in the mountain above the town. There is a singing hall and one restaurant next to the river which serves traditional food of the region to travelers and sometimes locals. A spring flows from the mountainside with fresh mineral water of which the town consistently drinks.

In 2019, Lentekhi removed a figure of the goddess Dali from the design of a fountain planned for the city's main square. Metropolitan Stephan of the Georgian Orthodox eparchy of Tsageri and Lentekhi had strongly criticized the inclusion of the goddess as idolatry, although mayor Badri Liparteliani stated the change was intended to increase the fountain's efficiency and visual appeal. The final version was built without the statue of Dali.

== See also ==
- Subdivisions of Georgia
