= Karti =

Karti كرتي
- Village
- Location within Iran
- Coordinates: 25°27′32″N 59°05′12″E
- Country: Iran
- Province: Hormozgan
- County: Jask
- Bakhsh: Lirdaf
- Rural District: Piveshk

Population (2006)
  - Total: 522
- Time zone: UTC+3:30 (IRST)
  - Summer (DST): UTC+4:30 (IRDT)

Karti (Persian: كرتي, also Romanized as Kartī, Keretī, and Kerti) is a village in Piveshk Rural District, Lirdaf District, Jask County, Hormozgan Province, Iran. At the 2006 census, its population was 522, in 120 families.
