= Lentekhi Municipality =

Coordinates: 42.75°N 42.75°E

Lentekhi Municipality ლენტეხის მუნიციპალიტეტი
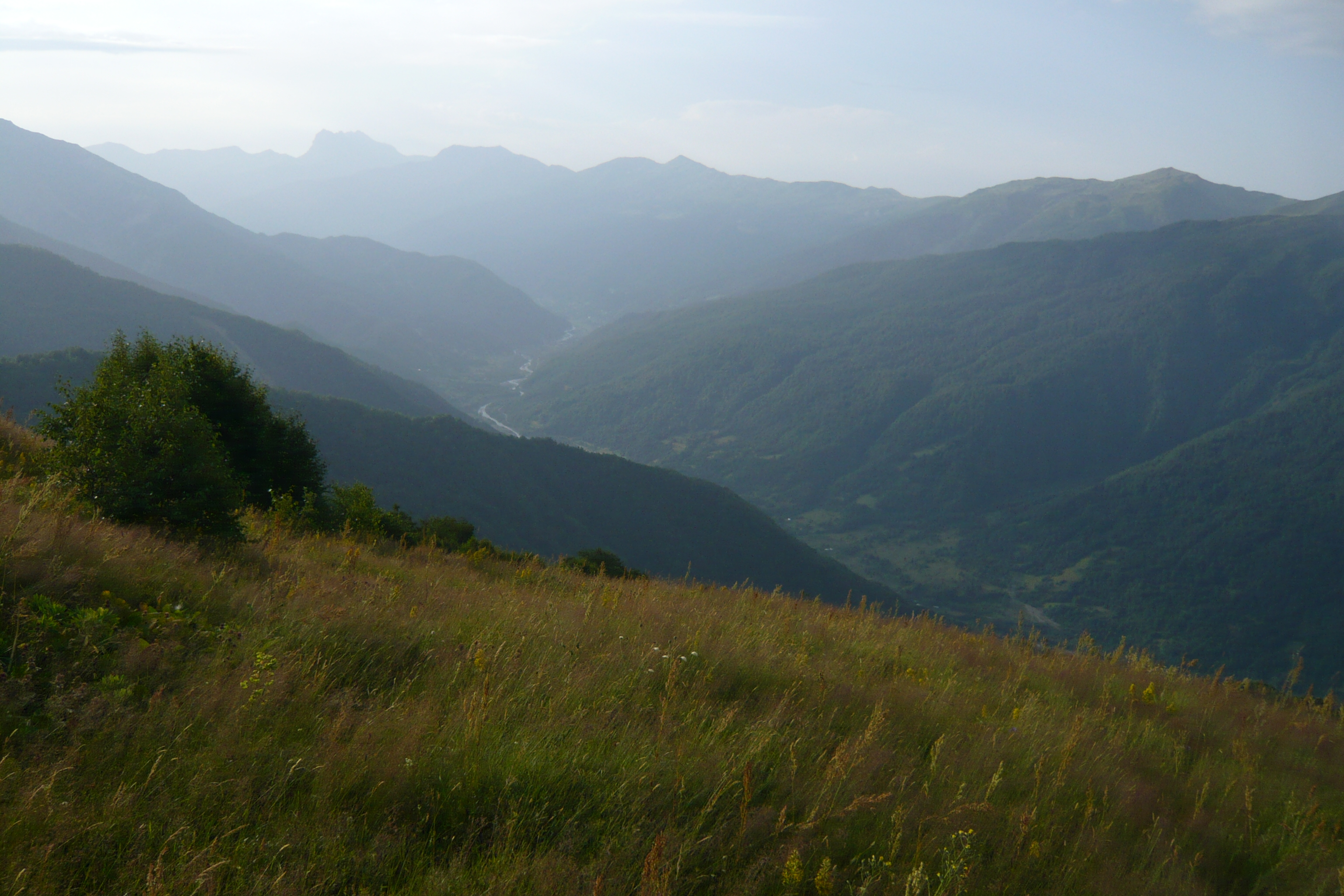
- Tskhenistsqali valley

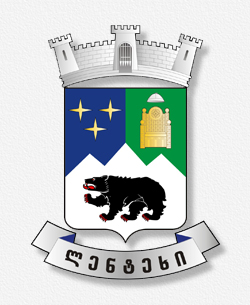
- Flag Seal

- Country: Georgia
- Mkhare: Racha-Lechkhumi and Kvemo Svaneti
- Capital: Lentekhi

Government
  - mayor: Gia Oniani (Georgian Dream)

Area
  - Total: 1,344 km^{2} (519 sq mi)

Population (2014)
  - Total: 4,386
  - Density: 3.3/km^{2} (8.5/sq mi)
- Time zone: UTC+4 (Georgian Time)

Lentekhi (Georgian: ლენტეხის მუნიციპალიტეტი, Lenṫexis municiṗaliṫeṫi) is a district of Georgia, in the region of Racha-Lechkhumi and Kvemo Svaneti. Its main town is Lentekhi.

== Politics ==
Lentekhi Municipal Assembly (Georgian: ლენტეხის საკრებულო, Lentekhis Sakrebulo) is a representative body in Lentekhi Municipality, consisting of 21 members which is elected every four years. The last election was held in October 2021. Gia Oniani of Georgian Dream was elected mayor.

Party	2017	2021	Current Municipal Assembly
Georgian Dream	16	13	
United National Movement	2	1	
People's Party		1	
Lelo		1	
For Georgia		1	
European Georgia	1	1	
Citizens		1	
Strategy Aghmashenebeli		1	
Free Georgia	1	1	
Alliance of Patriots	2		
Independent	1		
Total	23	21	

== See also ==
- List of municipalities in Georgia (country)
