= Tsageri Municipality =

Coordinates: 42.6497°N 42.7597°E

Tsageri Municipality ცაგერის მუნიციპალიტეტი
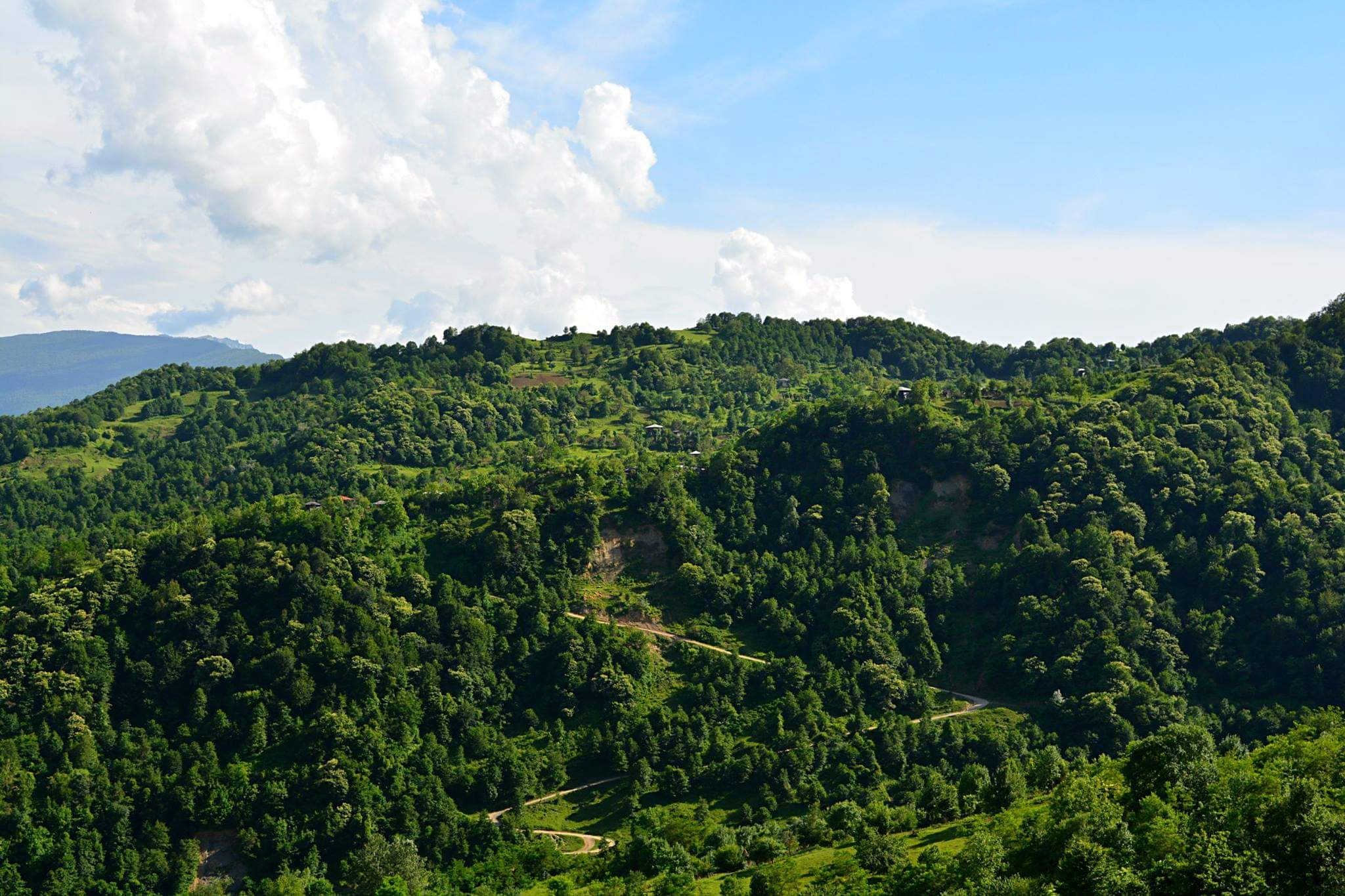
- Tsageri Municipality

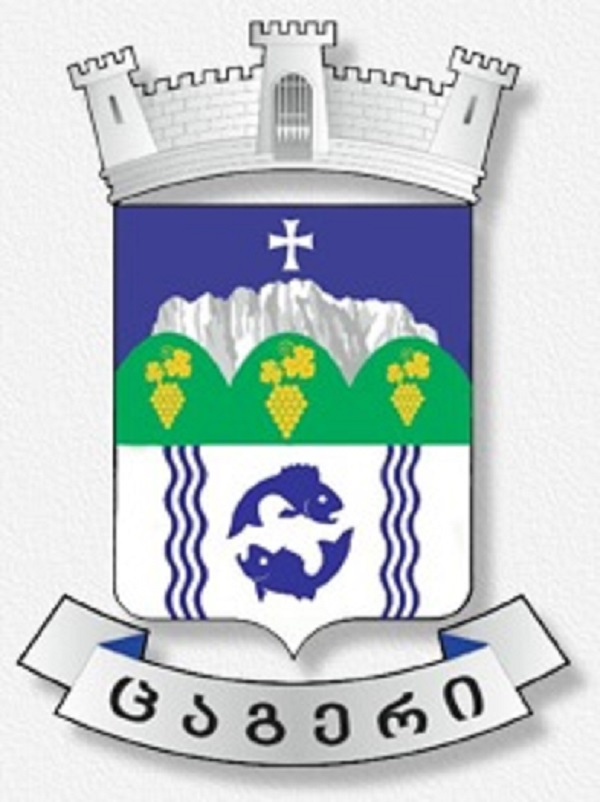
- Flag Seal

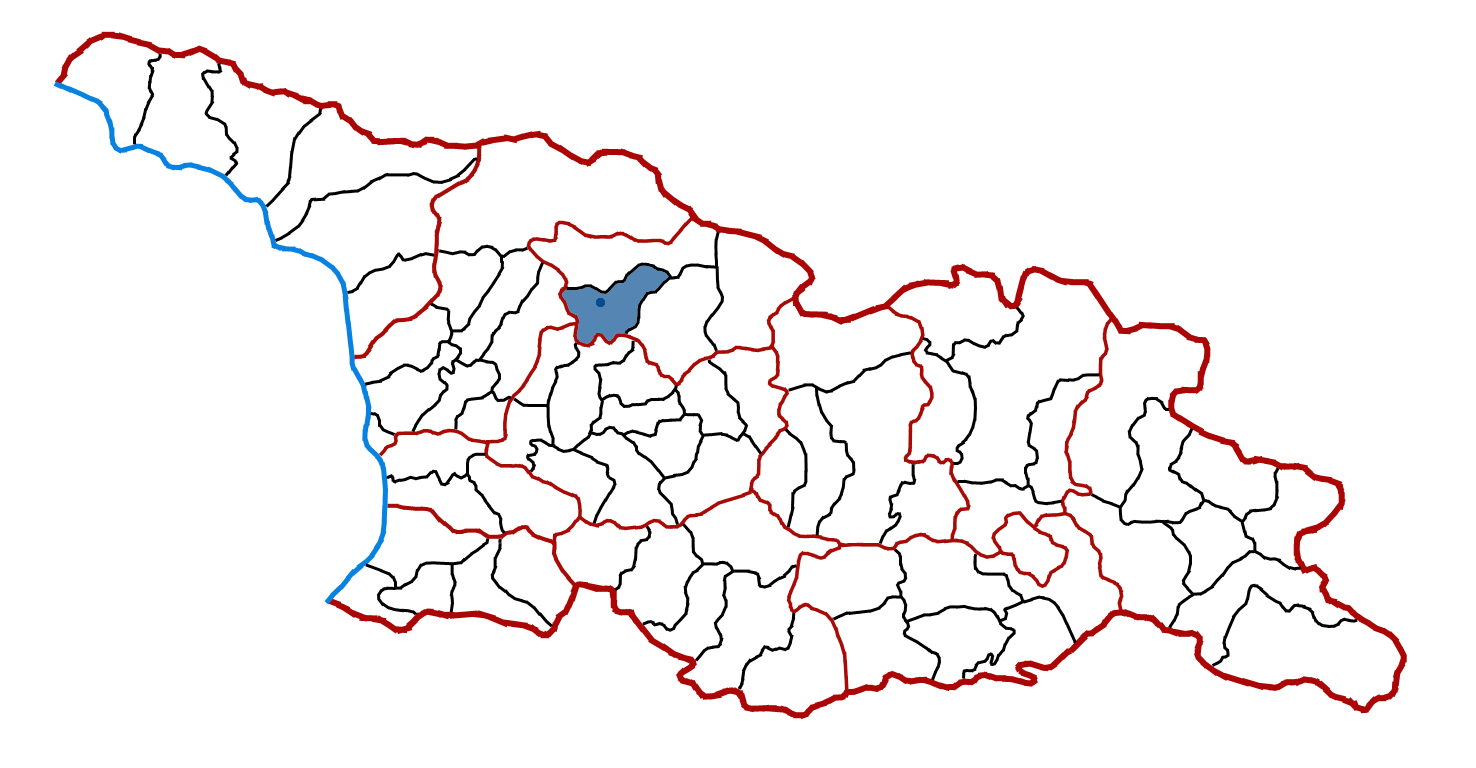
- Country: Georgia
- Mkhare: Racha-Lechkhumi and Kvemo Svaneti
- Capital: Tsageri

Government
  - mayor: Georgi Nemsadze (Georgian Dream)

Area
  - Total: 756 km^{2} (292 sq mi)

Population (2014)
  - Total: 10 387
- Time zone: UTC+4 (Georgian Time)

Tsageri (Georgian: ცაგერის მუნიციპალიტეტი [t̪͡s̪ʰäge̞ɾis mun̪it̪͡s̪ʰip'älit'e̞t'i], Cageris municiṗaliṫeṫi) is a district of Georgia, in the region of Racha-Lechkhumi and Kvemo Svaneti. Its main town is Tsageri.

== Demographic ==
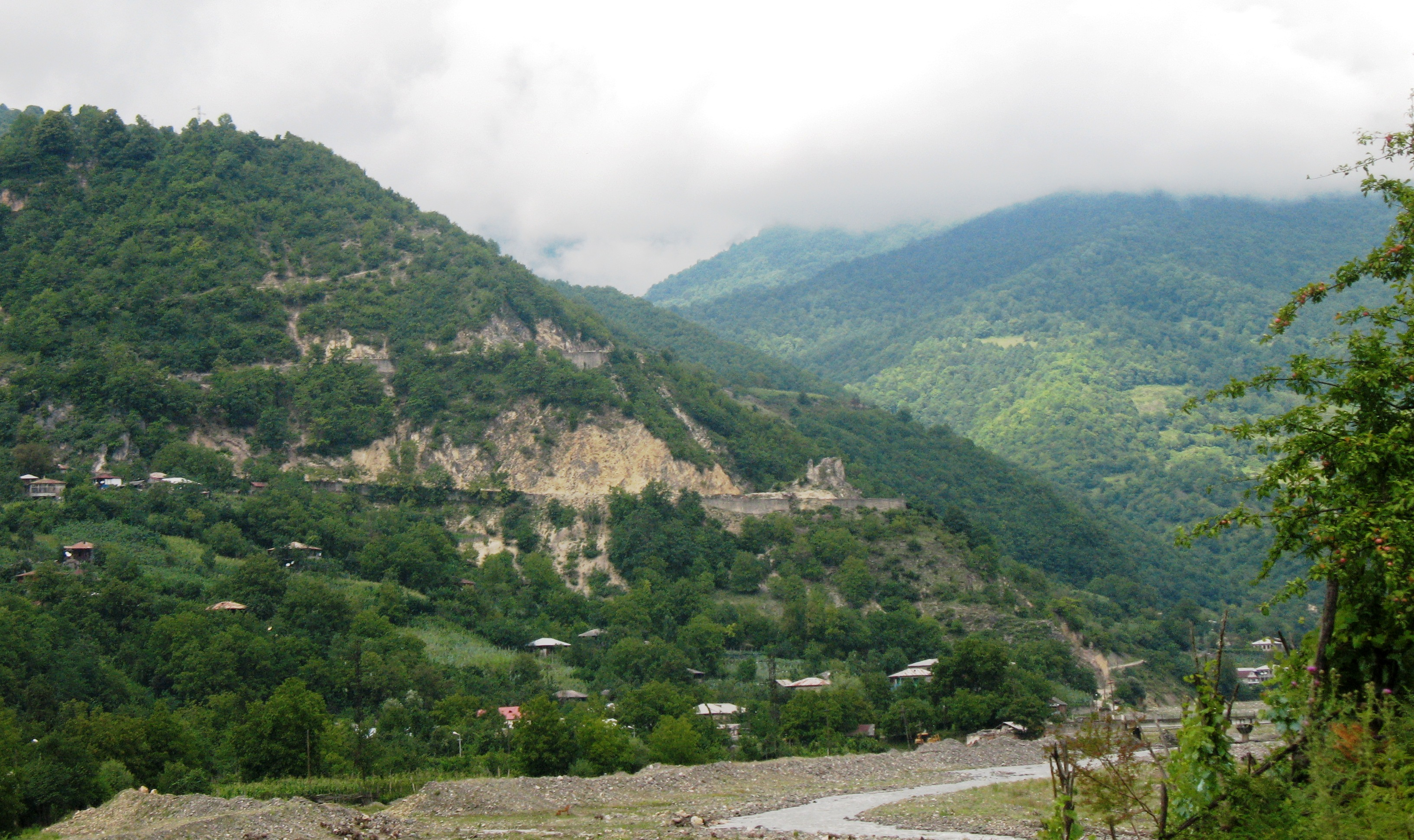
view to Orbeli

=== Population evolution ===
აღწერის წელი	მოსახლეობა
1989	17 166
2002	16 558 ▼
2014	10 387 ▼

=== Ethnic groups ===
Georgians represent 99,8% of the population. Russians represent 0,1% of the population.

== Politics ==
Tsageri Municipal Assembly (Georgian: ცაგერის საკრებულო, Tsageri Sakrebulo) is a representative body in Tsageri Municipality, consisting of 30 members which is elected every four years. The last election was held in October 2021. Georgi Nemsadze of Georgian Dream was elected mayor.

Party	2017	2021	Current Municipal Assembly
Georgian Dream	24	19	
For Georgia		4	
Ahali		3 (Note: Split from UNM.)	
United National Movement	1	1	
Lelo		1	
Strategy Aghmashenebeli		1	
Labour Party	1	1	
European Georgia	3		
Alliance of Patriots	1		
Free Georgia	1		
Total	31	30	

== See also ==
- List of municipalities in Georgia (country)
