= Administrative divisions of Georgia (country) =

Overview of the levels of political administration in Georgia (country)

Autonomous republics, regions, municipalities
- Category: Unitary state
- Location: Georgia
- Number: 2 autonomous republics 9 regions 76 municipalities
- Populations: (Regions only): 51,000 (Racha-Lechkhumi and Kvemo Svaneti) – 487,000 (Imereti)
- Areas: (Regions only): 2,030 km^{2} (785 sq mi) (Guria) – 11,380 km^{2} (4,393 sq mi) (Kakheti)
- Government: Municipal bodies, Autonomous Republican government, National government

The subdivisions of Georgia are autonomous republics (Georgian: ავტონომიური რესპუბლიკა, avt’onomiuri resp’ublik’a), regions (მხარე, mkhare), and municipalities (Georgian: მუნიციპალიტეტი, munitsip’alit’et’i).

Georgia is a unitary state, whose borders are defined by the law as corresponding to the situation of 21 December 1991. It includes two autonomous republics (Georgian: ავტონომიური რესპუბლიკა, avt’onomiuri resp’ublik’a), those of Adjara and Abkhazia, the latter being outside Georgia's effective control. The former Soviet-era autonomous entity of South Ossetia is also not currently under Georgia's de facto jurisdiction, and has no final defined constitutional status in Georgia's territorial arrangement.

The territory of Georgia is currently subdivided into a total of 69 municipalities of which 5 are self-governing cities (ქალაქი, kalaki), including the nation's capital of Tbilisi, and 64 municipalities consisting of multiple urban or rural settlements which are grouped in administrative communities (თემი, temi) within the municipality. The municipalities outside the two autonomous republics and Tbilisi are grouped, on a provisional basis, into nine regions (mkhare): Guria, Imereti, Kakheti, Kvemo Kartli, Mtskheta-Mtianeti, Racha-Lechkhumi and Kvemo Svaneti, Samegrelo-Zemo Svaneti, Samtskhe-Javakheti, and Shida Kartli. Tbilisi itself is divided into ten districts (რაიონი, raioni).

== Autonomous republics ==
The two autonomous republics, Abkhazia and Adjara, were established during the Soviet era and are recognized by the modern Constitution of Georgia adopted in 1995.

=== Abkhazia ===
As a result of the military conflicts in 1992–1993 and 2008, Georgia has no effective control over Abkhazia, whose declaration of independence is recognized by Russia and three other UN member states. Georgia considers Abkhazia as its autonomous republic, whose government sits in exile in Tbilisi, and currently an occupied territory. Abkhazia's territory, in the Kodori Valley, which had been under Georgia's control prior to the Russo–Georgian War of 2008, is de jure the self-governing community of Azhara. Abkhazia's secessionist government divides the entity's territory into seven districts (raion).

=== Adjara ===
Adjara is subdivided into 6 municipalities:

1. The self-governing city of Batumi, which is the entity's capital;
2. The self-governing municipality of Keda;
3. The self-governing municipality of Kobuleti;
4. The self-governing municipality of Khelvachauri;
5. The self-governing municipality of Shuakhevi;
6. The self-governing municipality of Khulo.

== Former autonomous oblast (Soviet era) ==
=== South Ossetia ===
South Ossetia enjoyed the status of an autonomous oblast in the Soviet era, until this autonomy was abolished in December 1990. When Georgia became independent, the territory of South Ossetia covered four municipalities that were de jure in separate present-day Georgian regions (established in 1995): the bulk was assigned to Shida Kartli, the north-western tip to Racha-Lechkhumi and Kvemo Svaneti, a small western section to Imereti, and the eastern part to Mtskheta-Mtianeti.

After the military conflicts in 1991–1992 and 2008, Georgia considers the former Autonomous Oblast of South Ossetia an occupied territory. Its status is not constitutionally defined by Georgia, but there was an Administration of South Ossetia sitting in exile in Tbilisi until 2026. The territory which had been under Georgia's control prior to the Russo–Georgian War of 2008, was organized into four municipalities, which retain their de jure status. South Ossetia's secessionist government divides the entity's territory into four districts (raion).

The laws of Georgia include a notion that the final subdivision and system of local self-government should be established after the restoration of the state's sovereignty in the occupied territories.

== Regions ==
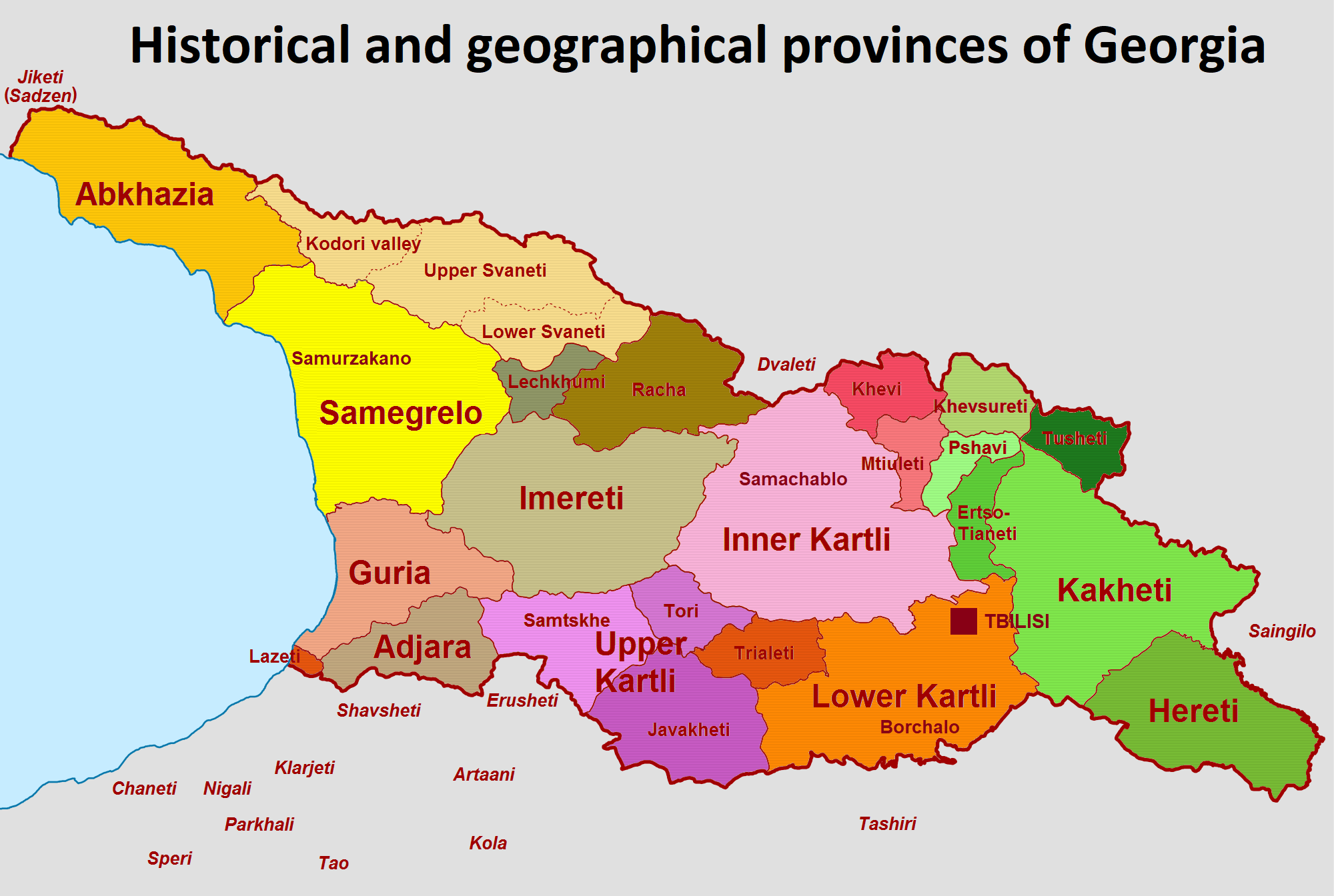
Map of the historical and geographical provinces of Georgia (provinces outside the borders of modern Georgia are indicated in italics).

Regions (mkhare) were established by presidential decrees from 1994 to 1996, on a provisional basis until the secessionist conflicts in Abkhazia and South Ossetia are resolved. They roughly correspond to the traditional principal historical and geographical areas of Georgia. A region is not a self-governing unit; its function is, rather, to coordinate communication of several municipalities (with the exception of the municipalities of Adjara and that of Tbilisi) with the central government of Georgia, which is represented in a region by an official appointed by Prime Minister, the State Commissioner (სახელმწიფო რწმუნებული), informally known as "governor" (გუბერნატორი).

Population of Regions
Region	Population	Population Density (/km^{2})	Area of Region (km^{2})	Zone	Additional Notes
Tbilisi	1,241,700	3,194.38	504.2	East	
Imereti	463,100	83	6,475	West	Small part de facto part of South Ossetia, considered occupied by Russia by Georgia
Adjara	361,400	166.72	2,880	West	
Kvemo Kartli	442,800	70	6,072	East	
Samegrelo-Zemo Svaneti	299,300	45	7,440	West	
Kakheti	306,200	28	11,311	East	
Shida Kartli	249,800	46.2	5,729	East	Partially de facto part of South Ossetia, considered occupied by Russia by Georgia
Abkhazia	240,705	28	8,660	West	De facto independent. Considered occupied by Russia by Georgia.
Samtskhe-Javakheti	147,400	25	6,413	East	
Guria	104,300	56	2,033	West	
Mtskheta-Mtianeti	93,300	14	6,786	East	Small part de facto part of South Ossetia, considered occupied by Russia by Georgia.
Racha-Lechkhumi and Kvemo Svaneti	27,100	6.4	4,990	West	Small part de facto part of South Ossetia, considered occupied by Russia by Georgia.

== Municipalities ==
Municipalities and regions of Georgia

According to the Georgian law, a municipality is a settlement or a group of settlements with defined borders and self-government. There are two types of municipalities—self-governing cities, five in total, and self-governing communities, 64 in total as of January 2019. The current municipalities were established between 2006 and 2017. Most of the municipalities recapitulate the boundaries and names of earlier subdivisions, known as raioni (district).

== See also ==
- ISO 3166-2 codes for regions and autonomous republics of Georgia
- List of cities and towns in Georgia
- List of Georgian regions by Human Development Index
- List of municipalities in Georgia
