= Tskhenistsqali =

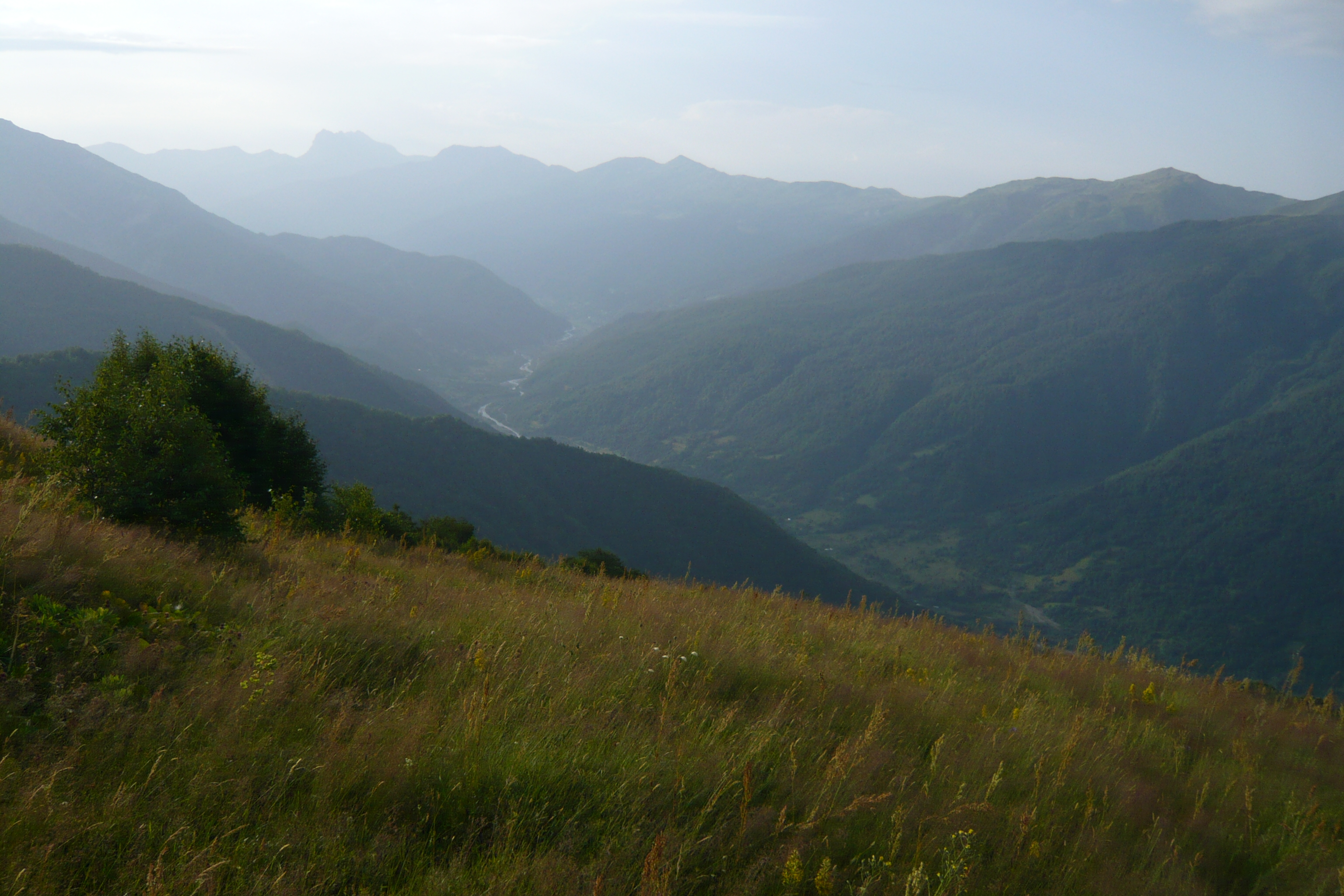
- Tskhenistsqali valley in Lower Svaneti

- Location within Samegrelo-Zemo Svaneti Location within Georgia
- Native name: ცხენისწყალი (Georgian)

Location
- Country: Georgia

Physical characteristics
- Source
  - location: Caucasus Major
- Mouth: Rioni
  - coordinates: 42.1252°N 42.2989°E
- Length: 176 km (109 mi)
- Basin size: 2,120 km^{2} (820 sq mi)

Basin features
- Progression: Rioni→ Black Sea

Tskhenistsqali river (in red) on the map of Georgia

The Tskhenistsqali (Georgian: ცხენისწყალი, Cxenisċqali [t̪͡s̪ʰχe̞n̪is̪t͡s'χ'äli], also: Tskhenistskali) is a river in northern Georgia. Its source is in the main range of the Caucasus Mountains, in the easternmost part of the Lentekhi Municipality, lower Svaneti. A tributary of the river Rioni, it is 176 km (109 mi) long, and has a drainage basin of 2,120 km^{2} (820 sq mi). It flows through the small towns Lentekhi and Tsageri and joins the Rioni near the town of Samtredia. The main tributaries of Tskhenistskali are: Zsekho, Kheleldula, Janolula ( from the right ), Kobishuri, Leuseri, Khopuri (from the left).

From etymological standpoint the name is derived from the Georgian words ცხენი (Cxeni, "horse") and წყალი (Tsqali, "water"), thereby meaning "horse water" and is therefore identified with the ancient Hippus river mentioned by Arrian (Periplus, 13).
