= Rioni =

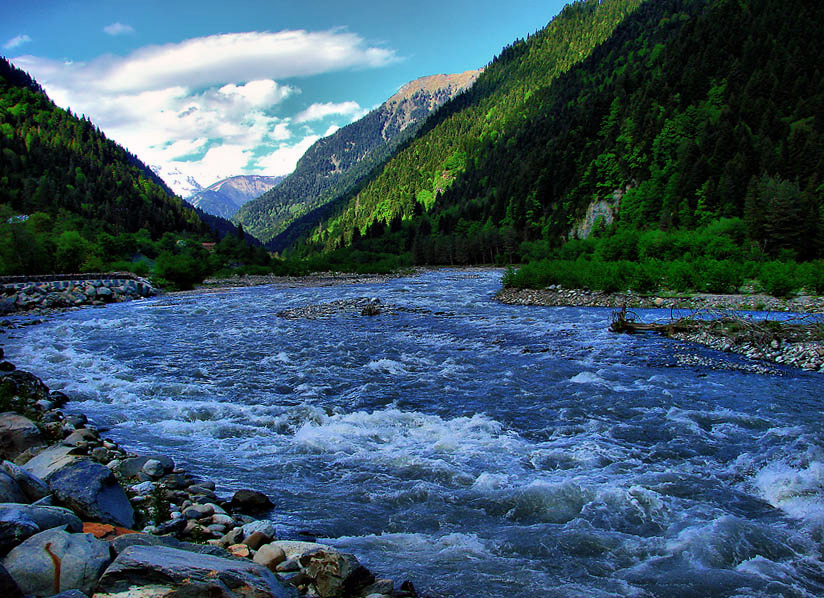
- Rioni River in Racha Region

- Location within Georgia
- Native name: რიონი (Georgian)

Location
- Country: Georgia
- Cities: Kutaisi; Vani; Samtredia; Poti

Physical characteristics
- Source: Main Caucasian Range; Caucasus Mountains
- Mouth: Black Sea
  - location: Poti
  - coordinates: 42°11′3″N 41°38′10″E
- Length: 327 km (203 mi)

Basin features
- Tributaries
  - left: Tekhuri, Qvirila
  - right: Tskhenistsqali

The Rioni (Georgian: რიონი [ˈɾio̞n̪i]; Ancient Greek: Φᾶσις, Phâsis) is the main river of western Georgia. It originates in the Caucasus Mountains, in the region of Racha and flows west to the Black Sea, entering it north of the city of Poti (near ancient Phasis). The city of Kutaisi, once the ancient city of Colchis, lies on its banks. It drains the western Transcaucasus into the Black Sea while the river Kura drains the eastern Transcaucasus into the Caspian Sea.

== History ==
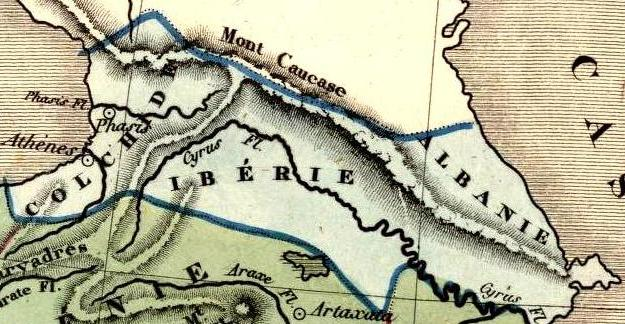
Herodotus considered the Rioni river to be a boundary between Europe and Asia.

=== Ancient authors ===
Known to the ancient Greeks as the river Phasis, the Rioni was first mentioned by Hesiod in his Theogony (l.340); Plato has Socrates remark: "I believe that the earth is very large and that we who dwell between the pillars of Hercules and the river Phasis live in a small part of it about the sea, like ants or frogs about a pond" (Phaedo, 109a). Later writers like Apollonius Rhodius (Argonautica 2.12.61), Virgil (Georgics 4.367) and Aelius Aristides (Ad Romam 82) considered it the easternmost limit of the navigable seas. Herodotus and Anaximander considered Rioni a boundary between Europe and Asia. The famed voyage of Jason and the Argonauts, though semi-mythological, was said to have occurred by the Argonauts sailing up the river Phasis from its outlet on the Black Sea at Poti, to Colchis (modern Kutaisi in Georgia).

=== Pheasant ===
The term "pheasant" and the scientific name Phasianus colchicus are derived from "Phasis" and "Colchis", as this was said to be the region from which the common pheasant was introduced to Europe (the ring-necked pheasants were introduced later from East Asia).

=== Draining ===
It is said that "the failure of Colchis to emerge as a strong kingdom or to be maintained as a province of Rome has been blamed on the pestilential climate of the Phasis Valley, a situation remarked upon by travelers down to modern times, when the swamps were finally drained." Wetlands around Rioni River has been drained through a large reclamation-drainage project commissioned by government in 1960. After that, the area was cleared and converted to agricultural land.

== Description ==
The Rioni is the longest river wholly within the borders of Georgia. The river is 327 kilometres (203 mi) long, and its drainage basin covers about 13,400 square kilometres (5,200 mi^{2}). It starts on the southern slopes of the Caucasus Mountains at 2,960 metres (9,710 ft) above sea level, north of the town of Oni. Its largest tributaries are, from source to mouth: Jejora (left), Qvirila (left), Khanistsqali (left), Tskhenistsqali (right) and Tekhuri (right).

== Phasis river at Taprobana ==
Stephanus of Byzantium wrote that there was also another river which was named Phasis, in Taprobana (Ancient Greek: Φᾶσις ἐν τῇ Ταπροβάνῃ), as the Indian Ocean island of Ceylon or Sri Lanka was known to the ancient Greeks.
