= List of monuments in Former Java District =

The monuments in the former Java District is a group of cultural heritage sites registered by the government of Georgia on the territory of the de jure Former Java District, which has been under the control of South Ossetia, an entity with limited international recognition, since the 2008 Russo-Georgian War. Due to the continued presence of the Russian troops, Georgia, in accordance to its Law on Occupied territories (Article 7.4), holds Russia responsible for the protection of cultural heritage in the area.

The table lists a monument, its location and dating as well as the status attached to it by the Georgian authorities and the number assigned in the registry by the National Agency for Cultural Heritage Preservation of Georgia, which is available online as a GIS portal. The Agency broadly classifies the heritage sites into three groups: 1) the objects without a status, 2) immovable monuments of cultural heritage

Object	National Registry number	Date of construction	Location	Status	Image
Britata Tower	2218	Late Middle Ages	Britata	Cultural Monument	
Gagloevebi Tower	2239	Late Middle Ages	Kidobina	Cultural Monument	
Gazashvilebi Tower		Late Middle Ages	Sagilzazi		
Edisa Church	2221	Late Middle Ages	Edisa	Cultural Monument	
Vaneli Cross Church	2224	Late Middle Ages	Vaneli	Cultural Monument	
Zemo-Korsevi Tower	2226	Late Middle Ages	Zemo-Korsevi	Cultural Monuement	
Zemo-Koshka Tower		Late Middle Ages	Zemo-Koshka		
The Fourth Tower of Zemo Roka	2232	Late Middle Ages	Zemo Roka	Cultural Monument	
The Second Tower of Zemo Roka	2232	Late Middle Ages	Zemo Roka	Cultural Monument	
The Third Tower of Zemo Roka	2232	Late Middle Ages	Zemo Roka	Cultural Monument	
The Fifth Tower of Zemo Roka	2232	Late Middle Ages	Zemo Roka	Cultural Monument	
The First Tower of Zemo Roka	2232	Late Middle Ages	Zemo Roka	Cultural Monument	
Zemo Roka Palace	2231	Middle Ages	Zemo Roka	Cultural Monument	
Zghubiri Church	2233	Late Middle Ages	Zghubiri	Cultural Monument	
Tandelta Tower	2234	Late Middle Ages	Tandelta	Cultural Monument	
Tlia Tower	2236	Late Middle Ages	Tlia	Cultural Monument	
Gufi Church	7569	Middle Ages	Gufi	Cultural Monument	
Church of Saint George in Tlia	2235	Late Middle Ages	Tlia	Cultural Monument	
Tomaevebi Tower	2230	Late Middle Ages	Zemo Roka	Cultural Monument	
Kabuzta Tower	2237	Late Middle Ages	Kabuzta	Cultural Monument	
Kodibina Tower		Late Middle Ages	Kodibina		
Korsev Cross	2227	Late Middle Ages	Zemo-Korsevi	Cultural Monument	
Kroza Saint George Church		Late Middle Ages	Kroza		
Kroza Tower	2241	Late Middle Ages	Kroza	Cultural Monument	
Former Church of Kroza Juari		Late Middle Ages	Kroza		
Kudaro I	7636	Lower Paleolithic	Chasavali	Cultural Monument	
Kudaro III	7636	Lower Paleolithic	Chasavali	Cultural Monument	
Midart Tower		Late Middle Ages	Vaneli		
Mskhlebi Church	2243	Late Middle Ages	Mskhlebi	Cultural Monument	
Mskhlebi Former Church		Late Middle Ages	Mskhlebi		
Mskhlebi Fortress	2242	Middle Ages	Mskhlebi	Cultural Monument	
Nazigina Tower	2245	Late Middle Ages	Nazigina	Cultural Monument	
Patara-Gupta Tower	2247	Late Middle Ages	Patara-Gupta	Cultural Monument	
Church of Saint George in Patara-Gupta	2246	Late Middle Ages	Patara-Gupta	Cultural Monument	
Rokata Tower	2248	Late Middle Ages	Rokata	Cultural Monument	
Sagilzaz Former Church		Late Middle Ages	Sagilzaz	Cultural Monument	
Saritata Church		Middle Ages	Saritata		
The Second Tower of Saritata	2250	Late Middle Ages	Saritata	Cultural Monument	
The First Tower of Saritata	2250	Middle Ages	Saritata	Cultural Monument	
The Second Tower of Saulokhtikau	2251	Late Middle Ages	Saulokhtikau	Cultural Monument	
The First Tower of Saulokhtikau	2251	Late Middle Ages	Saulokhtikau	Cultural Monument	
Saulokhtikau Icon	2252	Middle Ages	Saulokhtikau	Cultural Monument	
Sokhta Church	2254	10th–11th Centuries	Sokhta	Cultural Monument	
Sulaiata District Tower		Late Middle Ages	Ugardanta		
Tbauacila Church	2222	20th Century	Edisa	Cultural Monument	
Tbeti Former Church		Middle Ages	Tbeti		
Tiranovebi Tower	2275	Late Middle Ages	Shua Roka	Cultural Monument	
Ugardanta Tower	2255	Late Middle Ages	Ugardanta	Cultural Monument	
Fadiev Tower	2244	Late Middle Ages	Mskhlebi	Cultural Monument	
Karzmana Church		20th century	Karzmana		
Kasagini Former Church		10th century	Kasagini		
Keshelta Church	2257	Late Middle Ages	Keshelta	Cultural Monument	
Keshelta Tower	2258	Late Middle Ages	Keshelta	Cultural Monument	
The second Tower of Keshelta	2258	Late Middle Ages	Keshelta	Cultural Monument	
Kvemo Ermani Tower	2260	Late Middle Ages	Kvemo Ermani	Cultural Monument	
Church of Saint George in Kvemo Ermani	2259	Late Middle Ages	Kvemo Ermani	Cultural Monument	
Kvemo-Koshka Tower	2262	Late Middle Ages	Kvemo-Koshka	Cultural Monument	
The Second Tower of Kvemo-Koshka	2262	Late Middle Ages	Kvemo-Koshka	Cultural Monument	
Kvemo-Roka Church	2264	19th century	Kvemo-Roka	Cultural Monument	
Kvemo-Roka Tower		Late Middle Ages	Kvemo-Roka		
The Second Tower of Kvemo-Roka		Late Middle Ages	Kvemo-Roka		
Kvemo-Roka Former Church		Late Middle Ages	Kvemo-Roka		
Kvemo-Sba Zurgiani Tower	2266	Late Middle Ages	Kvemo-Sba	Cultural Monument	
Kvemo-Sba Tower	2265	Late Middle Ages	Kvemo-Sba	Cultural Monument	
The Fourth Tower of Kvemo-Jomagha	2267	Late Middle Ages	Kvemo-Jomagha	Cultural Monument	
The Second Tower of Kvemo-Jomagha	2267	Late Middle Ages	Kvemo-Jomagha	Cultural Monument	
The Third Tower of Kvemo-Jomagha	2267	Late Middle Ages	Kvemo-Jomagha	Cultural Monument	
The First Tower of Kvemo-Jomagha	2267	Late Middle Ages	Kvemo-Jomagha	Cultural Monument	
Kobeti Tower	2220	Early Middle Ages	Edisa	Cultural Monument	
Qemulta Tower	2268	Late Middle Ages	Kvemo Qemulta	Cultural Monument	
Qemulta Former Church	2269	Late Middle Ages	Qemulta	Cultural Monument	
Kola Tower	2270	Late Middle Ages	Kola	Cultural Monument	
Shavlokhovi Tower		Late Middle Ages	Britata		
Shua-Ermani Church	2272	Late Middle Ages	Shua-Ermani	Cultural Monument	
The Sixth tomb of Shua-Ermani	2271	Late Middle Ages	Shua-Ermani	Cultural Monument	
The Sixth Tower of Shua-Ermani	2273	Late Middle Ages	Shua-Ermani	Cultural Monument	
The Fourth Tomb of Shua-Ermani	2271	Late Middle Ages	Shua-Ermani	Cultural Monument	
The Fourth Tower of Shua-Ermani	2273	Late Middle Ages	Shua-Ermani	Cultural Monument	
The Second Tomb of Shua-Ermani	2271	Late Middle Ages	Shua-Ermani	Cultural Monument	
The Second Tower of Shua-Ermani	2273	Late Middle Ages	Shua-Ermani	Cultural Monument	
The Eighth Tower of Shua-Ermani	2273	Late Middle Ages	Shua-Ermani	Cultural Monument	
The Third Tomb of Shua-Ermani	2271	Late Middle Ages	Shua-Ermani	Cultural Monument	
The Third Tower of Shua-Ermani	2273	Late Middle Ages	Shua-Ermani	Cultural Monument	
The Seventh Tower of Shua-Ermani	2273	Late Middle Ages	Shua-Ermani	Cultural Monument	
The Fifth Tomb of Shua-Ermani	2271	Late Middle Ages	Shua-Ermani	Cultural Monument	
The Fifth Tower of Shua-Ermani	2273	Late Middle Ages	Shua-Ermani	Cultural Monument	
The First Tomb of Shua-Ermani	2271	Late Middle Ages	Shua-Ermani	Cultural Monument	
The First Tower of Shua-Ermani	2273	Late Middle Ages	Shua-Ermani	Cultural Monument	
Shua-Ermani Cemetery		Late Middle Ages	Shua-Ermani		
Church of Giorgobi in Shua-Koza	2274	Late Middle Ages	Shua-Koza	Cultural Monument	
The Sixth Tower of Shua-Roka	2276	Late Middle Ages	Shua-Roka	Cultural Monument	
The Fourth Tower of Shua-Roka	2276	Late Middle Ages	Shua-Roka	Cultural Monument	
The Second Tower of Shua-Roka	2276	Late Middle Ages	Shua-Roka	Cultural Monument	
The Third Tower of Shua-Roka	2276	Late Middle Ages	Shua-Roka	Cultural Monument	
The Fifth Tower of Shua-Roka	2276	Late Middle Ages	Shua-Roka	Cultural Monument	
The First Tower of Shua-Roka	2276	Late Middle Ages	Shua-Roka	Cultural Monument	
Golden Cross Church in Shua-Sba	2253	Late Middle Ages	Shua-Sba	Cultural Monument	
The Second Tower of Shua-Sba	2277	Late Middle Ages	Shua-Sba	Cultural Monument	
The Third Tower of Shua-Sba	2277	Late Middle Ages	Shua-Sba	Cultural Monument	
The First Tower of Shua-Sba	2277	Late Middle Ages	Shua-Sba	Cultural Monument	
Chamasa Tower	2281	Late Middle Ages	Chamasa	Cultural Monument	
Dzukaevi Tower	2280	Late Middle Ages	Cheliata	Cultural Monument	
Tsona Cave	7635	Lower Paleolithic	Tsona	Cultural Monument	
Domed Church in Tsru	2283	Late Middle Ages	Tsru	Cultural Monument	
The Fourth Tower in Tsru	2286	Late Middle Ages	Tsru	Cultural Monument	
The Second Tower in Tsru	2286	Late Middle Ages	Tsru	Cultural Monument	
The Third Tower in Tsru	2286	Late Middle Ages	Tsru	Cultural Monument	
Tsru Former Church	2284	Middle Ages	Tsru	Cultural Monument	
The First Tower in Tsru	2286	Late Middle Ages	Tsru	Cultural Monument	
Tsru Shrine Stone-Icon	2285	Middle Ages	Tsru	Cultural Monument	
Tsru Trinity Church	2282	Middle Ages	Tsru	Cultural Monument	
The Second Tower of Cheliata	2279	Late Middle Ages	Cheliata	Cultural Monument	
The Third Tower of Cheliata	2279	Late Middle Ages	Cheliata	Cultural Monument	
The First Tower of Cheliata	2279	Late Middle Ages	Cheliata	Cultural Monument	
Choisi Church		Middle Ages	Karzmani		
Khardisari Former Church		Middle Ages	Khardisari		
Khardisari Former Church (Verkhvnari)		Middle Ages	Khardisari		
Khardisari Former Church (Kauta)		Middle Ages	Khardisari		
Khodzi Tomb		Late Middle Ages	Khodzi		
Khodzi Tower		Late Middle Ages	Khodzi		
The Fourth Tower of Khodzi		Late Middle Ages	Khodzi		
The Second Tower of Khodzi		Late Middle Ages	Khodzi		
The Third Tower of Khodzi		Late Middle Ages	Khodzi		
The First Tower of Khodzi		Late Middle Ages	Khodzi		
Church of Saint George in Khodzi		19th–20th centuries	Khodzi		
Khodzi Icon		Late Middle Ages	Khodzi		
Java Dedaghvtisa Church	2217	Middle Ages	Java	Cultural Monument	
Java Dedaghvtisa Church (19th–20th centuries)		19th–20th centuries	Java		
Java Church		Middle Ages	Java		
Jria Church		19th–20th centuries	Jria		
Jria Tower	2287	Late Middle Ages	Jria	Cultural Monument	

== See also ==
- List of Cultural Heritage Monuments of Georgia
