= Kvemo Qemulta =

Coordinates: 42°26′14″N 43°49′40″E

Kvemo Qemulta or Qemult’a (Georgian: ყემულთა (ქვემო)) is a settlement in the Dzau district of South Ossetia, Georgia. It is located at the confluence of the rivers Keshelti and Patsa (Great Liakhvi basin) on the Tskhinvali-Oni highway. 1600 meters above sea level, 12 kilometers from Java.

== History ==
In 1921, 20 villages in the Qemulta community belonged to the South Ossetian Revcom. In 1922-90 it was part of the Java district and was the center of the Rural Council for neighboring villages: Abano (Java municipality), Tlia, Nazigina, Saritata, Sokhta, Kvemo Machkhara, Kotanto, Shiboita, Chitata, and Khikhata. Currently occupied by Russia.

== See also ==
- Dzau district
