= Sheubani =

Sheubani Georgian: შეუბანი Iron Ossetic: Шеубани
- Interactive map of Sheubani
- Location in Georgia Sheubani (Racha-Lechkhumi and Kvemo Svaneti) Sheubani (Georgia)
- Coordinates: 42°31′06″N 43°38′38″E
- Country: Georgia
- Mkhare: Shida Kartli
- Municipality: Java
- Community: Mskhlebi
- Elevation: 1,415 m (4,642 ft)

Sheubani (Georgian: შეუბანი; Iron Ossetic: Шеубани) is a settlement in the Java district of South Ossetia, Georgia. It is located on the left bank of Jejora river (a tributary of Rioni river) and borders Kvaisa on it east side.

== Geography ==
It is located on the right bank of the middle reaches of the Jojora River, adjacent to the city of Kwaisa from the west.

== See also ==
- Dzau district
