= Buzala =

Buzala ბუზალა
- Interactive map of Buzala
- Location in Georgia Buzala (Shida Kartli)
- Coordinates: 42°22′30″N 43°55′10″E
- Country: Georgia
- Mkhare: Shida Kartli
- Municipality: Java
- Community: Mskhlebi
- Elevation: 1,120 m (3,670 ft)

Buzala (Georgian: ბუზალა, Iron Ossetic: Бузала) is a village in northern Georgia. It is located on the left bank of the river Greater Liakhvi, in the Dzau District/Java Municipality, South Ossetia/Shida Kartli region. Distance to the municipal center, Java, is 1.5 km.

== Sources ==
- "ბუზალა" (PDF). Georgian Soviet Encyclopedia (in Georgian). Vol. 2. Tbilisi. 1977. p. 554.
