= Duodonasto =

Duodonasto Georgian: დუოდონასტო Iron Ossetic: Дыууæдонастæу
- Interactive map of Duodonasto
- Location in Georgia Duodonasto (Shida Kartli) Duodonasto (Georgia)
- Coordinates: 42°29′30″N 43°55′53″E
- Country: Georgia
- Mkhare: Shida Kartli
- Municipality: Java
- Community: Mskhlebi

Duodonasto or Duadonastau (Georgian: დუოდონასტო; Iron Ossetic: Дыууæдонастæу; Dywwædonastæw) is a settlement in the Dzau district/Java Municipality in South Ossetia/Shida Kartli, Georgia.

== See also ==
- Dzau district
