= Muldarta =

Muldarta მულდართა
- Interactive map of Muldarta
- Location in Georgia Muldarta (Shida Kartli) Muldarta (Georgia)
- Coordinates: 42°27′38″N 43°52′03″E
- Country: Georgia
- Mkhare: Shida Kartli
- Municipality: Java
- Community: Mskhlebi

Muldarta (Georgian: მულდართა) is a settlement in the Java district of South Ossetia, Georgia.

== See also ==
- Dzau district
