= Kola =

Kola may refer to:

== People ==
- Koła, a Polish noble family
- Kola (name), people with the given name/surname Kola
- Kola (singer), Ukrainian singer, songwriter and performer of her own songs
- Kola people, Gabonese pygmies
- Kola or Kula people (Asia) of Cambodia and Thailand
- Gyele people, also known as the Kola, Cameroonian pygmies

== Places ==
- Kola Peninsula, a peninsula in the far north of Russia
- Kola Bay, also known as Kola Inlet, a fjord in Murmansk Oblast, Russia on the Kola Peninsula
- Kola (river), a river in Murmansk Oblast, Russia on the Kola Peninsula
- Kola, Russia, a town in Murmansk Oblast, Russia on the Kola Peninsula
- Kola, alternative name of Kula, Iran, a village in East Azerbaijan Province
- Kola (historical region), part of the Georgian Tao-Klarjeti principalities, the contemporary Turkish district Göle
- Kola Island, one of the Aru Islands of Indonesia
- Kola Island, Sri Lanka, in southwestern Sri Lanka
- Kola, Mali
- Kola, Manitoba, Canada
- Kola, Hooghly, a census town in West Bengal, India
- Kola (Goražde), a village in Bosnia and Herzegovina
- Kola (South Ossetia), a settlement in the Dzau district, South Ossetia

== Other uses ==
- KOLA, a commercial classic hits music radio station in San Bernardino, California
- Kola (dance), a Belarusian folk dance
- "Kola" (song), a 1997 song by rock band The Rasmus
- Kola, a Russian Altay-class oiler
- Kola language, a language spoken on Kola Island
- Kola Nuclear Power Plant, a plant in Polyarnye Zori, Russia on the Kola Peninsula
- Kola Superdeep Borehole (KSDB), a Russian-funded project to drill into the Earth's crust on the Kola Peninsula
- Kola-class frigate, the NATO reporting name for a group of frigates built for the Soviet Navy in the 1950s
- Kola nut, a genus of about 125 species of trees

== See also ==
- Kolas
- Cola (disambiguation)
