= Bakhuta =

Bakhuta ბახუტა, Бахутæ
- Village
- Location of Bakhuta village Bakhuta (South Ossetia) Bakhuta (Shida Kartli)
- Coordinates: 42°24′41″N 43°50′58″E
- Country: Georgia
- Disputed territory: South Ossetia
- Mkhare: Shida Kartli
- Municipality: Java
- Community: Mskhlebi
- Elevation: 1,280 m (4,200 ft)

Bakhuta (Georgian: ბახუტა, Iron Ossetic: Бахутæ) is a highland village in Georgia's Russian-occupied territory of South Ossetia/Tskhinvali Region. It is located on the left bank of the river Patsa, to the south from Java Range, on the western slopes of Raro Mountain in the Java Municipality, Shida Kartli region. Distance to the municipal center, Java, is 20 km. The village is surrounded by fir, spruce-beech, and fir-beech mixed forests.
