= Shikhanturi =

Shikhanturi შიხანთური
- Village
- Location in Georgia
- Coordinates: 42°22′29.6″N 43°52′10.8″E
- Country: Georgia
- Mkhare: Shida Kartli
- Municipality: Java
- Community: Mskhlebi
- Elevation: 1,480 m (4,860 ft)

Shikhanturi (Georgian: შიხანთური) is a village in northern Georgia. It is located on the right bank of the river Patsa in the Java Municipality, Shida Kartli region. Distance to the municipal center, Java, is 7 km. The village is surrounded by Pine-beech and Beech-fir mixed forests.
