= Zegani =

Zegani ზეგანი (Georgian)
- Village
- Location in Georgia Zegani (Abkhazia)
- Coordinates: 43°27′01″N 40°08′58″E
- Country: Georgia
- Partially recognized independent country: Abkhazia
- District: Gagra
- Community: Mekhadiri
- Elevation: 520 m (1,710 ft)

Population (1989)
  - Total: 90
- Time zone: UTC+4 (GET)

Zegani (Georgian: ზეგანი) is a village at an altitude of 320 meters from sea level in the Gagra District of Abkhazia, (Note: The political status of Abkhazia is disputed. Having unilaterally declared independence from Georgia in 1992, Abkhazia is formally recognised as an independent state by 4 UN member states (three other states previously recognised it but then withdrew their recognition), while the remainder of the international community recognizes it as de jure Georgian territory. Georgia continues to claim the area as its own territory, designating it as Russian-occupied territory.) Georgia, 34 kilometres (21 mi) from Gagra. It is noted for its monastery complex, featuring a triple basilica.

== History and demographics ==
In 1959, there were 209 people living in the village, mainly Armenians. By the 1989 census, the village had 90 inhabitants, again mostly Armenians.

== Geography ==
Zegani lies to the southwest of Akvaskia and southwest of Ochamchire, 34 kilometres (21 mi) from Gagra. The Alazani River flows in the vicinity. Akuasnia Railway Station lies to the southeast. The area between the village and the Ochamchire-Tkvarceli Road to the east is forested.

== Architecture ==
Zegani is noted for its monastery complex, and features a basilica with three churches, dedicated to the Virgin ("Kvela Tsminda"). The Church of Our Lady measures 28.5 metres (94 ft) in overall length.

== See also ==
- Gagra District

== Literature ==
- Georgian Soviet Encyclopedia, V. 4, p. 493, Tb., 1979.
