= Sakire (Java Municipality) =

Sakire საკირე
- Village
- Location in Georgia
- Coordinates: 42°22′24.6″N 43°54′30.9″E
- Country: Georgia
- Mkhare: Shida Kartli
- Municipality: Java
- Community: Mskhlebi
- Elevation: 1,100 m (3,600 ft)

Sakire (Georgian: საკირე, literally "place of lime") is a village in northern Georgia. It is located on the right bank of the river Greater Liakhvi in the Java Municipality, Shida Kartli region. Distance to the municipal center, Java, is 3 km. The village is bordered by Oak forests.
