= Koshka =

Koshka (Russian: Кошка) means cat in Russian and may refer to

- Feodor Koshka, born Feodor Andreevich Kobylin, died 1407, Russian noble
- Elena Koshka, an American pornographic actress
- Koshka, a Gori Municipality settlement in Georgia
- Koshka Yavr (air base) in Murmansk Oblast, Russia
- Kvemo Koshka, a settlement in South Ossetia, Georgia
- Mount Koshka in Crimea
- Russkaya Koshka, a spit in Chukotka, Russia
- Zemo Koshka, a settlement in South Ossetia, Georgia
- Koshka, a catgirl in the game Vainglory
