= Luarsab Sharashidze =

Soviet scientist

- Born: 18 January 1923; Tbilisi, Socialist Soviet Republic of Georgia, SSRG
- Died: 7 February 1991 (aged 68); Tbilisi, Socialist Soviet Republic of Georgia
- Scientific career
- Institutions: Georgian Oncology Scientific Center

Luarsab Sharashidze (Georgian: ლუარსაბ შარაშიძე; 18 January 1923, Tbilisi, Georgian Soviet Socialist Republic – 7 February 1991, Tbilisi) was a Georgian physician, academic, pathologist, morphologist, and a pioneer of Cytochemistry and Histochemistry in Georgia. He was one of the principal developers and contributor of the Georgian Medical Healthcare system. He was the founder and director of the First Scientific Research and Clinical Centre of Oncology in Georgia. Internationally renowned Georgian academic and diagnostic cancer pathologist. Educator of many generations of Georgian and Soviet medical scientists, author of 10 monographs and 300 scientific works, project leader of 78 Phd and Doctorate theses, Honorary and Meritorious member of Georgian Academy of Sciences (1984). Sharashidze's notable scientific research discoveries in Experimental Oncology were included in the Great Medical Encyclopedia of USSR. He is the one and only Georgian and Soviet scientist who participated in all international symposiums and congresses of Cytochemistry and Histochemistry worldwide.

Luarsab Sharashidze had 50 years of scientific and teaching experience in pathology, morphology, cyto-histochemistry and oncology.

== Childhood and early education ==
Luarsab Sharashidze was born on 18 January 1923 in Tbilisi. His father, Kalistrate Sharashidze was a physician and general practitioner. His mother, Ekaterine Pkhakadze, was a teacher of Russian Language and Literature.

In 1930, Sharashidze entered Tbilisi First Secondary School, where he graduated with honors diploma in 1939. From 1939 to 1946 Sharashidze studied medicine and surgery at Tbilisi State Medical Institute and graduated with First Honors degree.

During the 4th year of his medical course, at the age of 20, on the recommendation of head of pathology department Academician V. Zhgenti, Sharashidze was appointed as a senior laboratory assistant at the same departement. It was the first and only precedent in the history of Georgian Medical Institute, when fourth-year medical student taught Pathology to the thirdyear medical students.

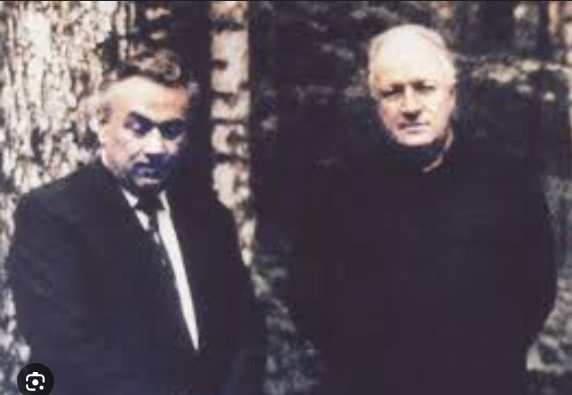
L. Sharashidze, B. Petrovski

From 1946 to 1949 he did his postgraduate course in Pathology and became PhD of medicine.

== Scientific research and achievements ==
From 1951 to 1956, Sharashidze was head of the Patho-Morphological department of the Tbilisi Scientific-Research Institute of Tuberculosis. In 1951, Sharashidze introduced the latest methods of neuro-morphological research to the department and in 1952–1953, he proved scientifically that the emergence, localization, course and outcome of tuberculosis depended directly on the condition of the innervation mechanisms. In 1954, he established the possibility of obtaining non-pathogenic strains of the microbe; He successfully Identified these forms of human actinomycosis, leading to the development of the new vaccines of the disease. Sharashidze's discovery was of considerable importance and was included in the Great Medical Encyclopedia of USSR.

In 1956, at the age of 33, he introduced novel cytochemical research methods in Georgia: tetrazone reaction (to identify aromatic amino acids), DDD reaction (to identify the thiol group of proteins) and Schiff-iodic acid reaction. In 1957, for the first time in Georgia, he founded the Department of Cyto-histochemistry in the Scientific-Research Institute of Experimental and Clinical Surgery of Georgia, which he led until 1973. During this period, the results of his scientific research work conducted in this department were published in international medical journals and medical manuals, leading to his renown both within and outside the USSR.

In 1958, Sharashidze was the first to use absorption microphotometry to determine the amount of nucleic acids and proteins by means of the "MUF-5" device. In 1959, he published the first practical manual in cytohistochemistry. In 1960, aged 37, he was the first Georgian scientist to present the results of cytochemical research at the USSR Congress of Pathomorphologists in Kharkiv in 1959 and later on at the First World Congress of Cytohistochemistry in Paris in 1960.

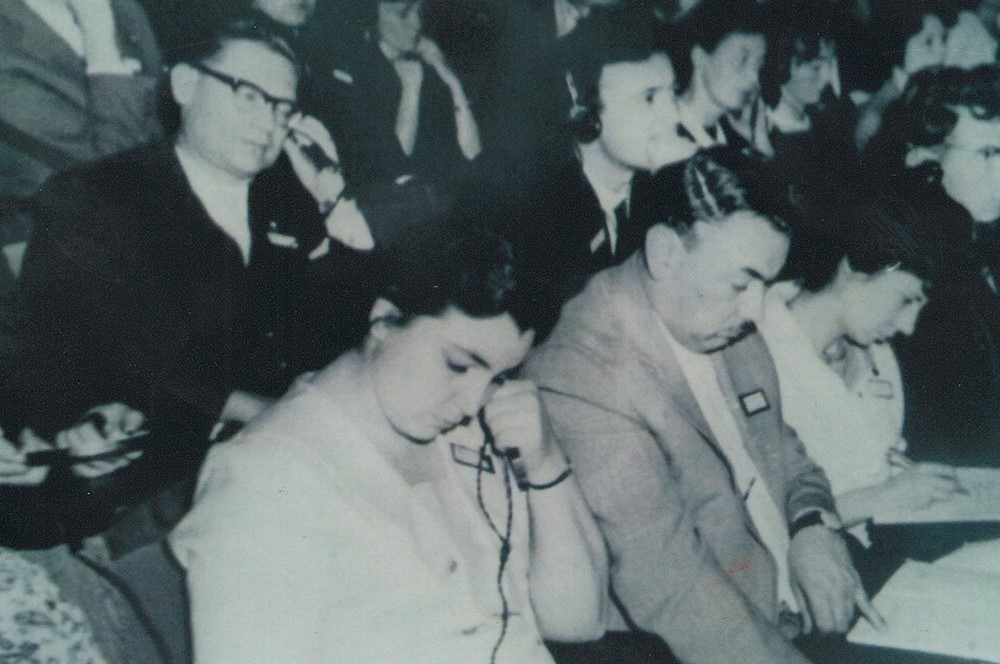
Luarsab Sharashidze and Rusudan Bulusashvili at the symposium in Poland

In 1960 L. Sharashidze defended his doctoral thesis and in 1963 he was awarded the title of professor in the field of pathology and morphology. In 1960, for the first time in Georgia, he published a monograph on Cytohistochemistry of Cancer.[3] In 1962, he was elected as a member of the Cytology Commission under the Presidium of the Academy of Sciences of the USSR and in 1963 as a member of the national committee in CytoHistochemistry at the Presidium of the Academy of Sciences of the Soviet Union.[4] He was a member of the Council of the Society of Oncologists of the Soviet Union, a member of the Scientific Council of the Academy of Sciences of the Soviet Union in Oncology, a member of the editorial board of the All union journal «Вопросы Онкологии». In 1964, for the first time in Georgia, he organised the 1st Union Symposium on Cytohistochemistry of Cancer. In 1968, he developed a new working scheme of the cell structure, which reveals the unity of all cellular and intracellular membranes and their structural-spatial relationship between the cytoplasm, nucleus and nucleolus. In 1971, he developed a new cytochemical method for DNA detection without thermal hydrolysis.[5] Under his leadership, the first Soviet Union-Poland symposium on the use of cytochemical methods in oncology was held in Georgia in 1972. In 1973, for the first time, he developed the cell differentiation maturation index, which is successfully used in the differential diagnosis of cancer. In 1973, he discovered a double form of RNA in the nucleus of a smooth cell: labile (necessary for reproduction) and stable (necessary for maturation); He also discovered an excess of labile RNA in cancerous cells and by replacing it in tissue cultures, accelerated cell maturation.

In 1973–1975, he was appointed as a director of the Scientific Research Institute of Oncology in Tbilisi, Georgia.

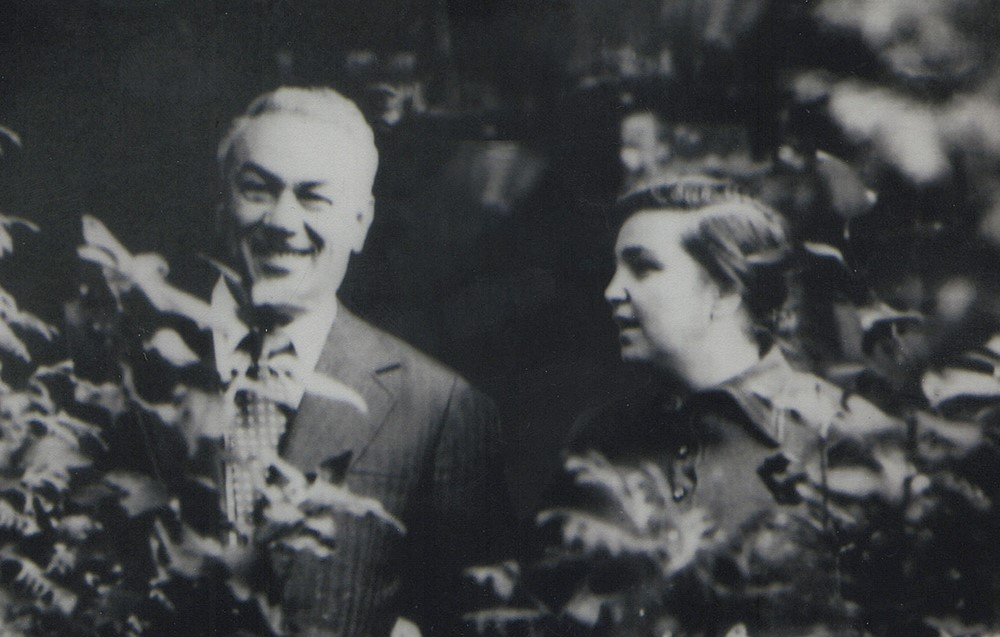

In 1974, he scientifically substantiated a completely new concept of carcinogenesis and determined that the hyperplastic processes occurring in tissues under the influence of chemical carcinogens are not due to the strengthening of the mitotic activity of cells, but rather to the suppression of the processes of cell reproduction and maturation. His discovery is included in the Great Medical Encyclopedia of Soviet Union. Founder of First Scientific-Research and Clinical Oncology Centre of Georgia

In 1974, he was the first who raised the alarm about the poor medical services in the field of oncology in Georgia. Most of the Georgian oncological patients at the time were seeking medical help outside Georgia, particularly in Moscow and Leningrad. As a Director of Institute of Oncology, to help these patients, he decided to reorganise the whole oncological service system in Georgia and raised the importance of the creation of a new Oncological Centre in Georgia by merging the Institute of Radiology, Institute of Oncology and oncology profile outpatient clinics together. L. Sharashidze's project was successfully was founded and implemented by him in 1975 with the support of E. Shevardnadze, Minister of Health of the Soviet Union, Academician B. Petrovsky and Director of the Moscow Oncology Scientific Centre, Academician N. Blokhin

Luarsab Sharashidze as a founder, was appointed as a director of this centre. Prof. Sharashidze started reorganisation of Georgian Oncology Services by opening new departments and recruiting the most eminent oncologists around the USSR. The Georgian Oncology Centre became the third leading Oncological institution in the Soviet Union, after the Moscow and St. Peterborough (Leningrad) Oncology Centres. Since 1977, on Prof. Sharashidze's initiative, clinical, theoretical and organizational departments and laboratories of 20 new profiles were formed in the Oncology Centre for the first time: chemical carcinogenesis, functional diagnostics, organizational methodology, scientific informatics and patent science, mammology, abdominal, urology, proctology, thoracic, children's oncology, endoscopy, head and neck, skin, soft tissues and bones, intensive care and resuscitation, cryosurgery, reflex therapy, immunological, bacteriological, hemoblastosis, chemotherapy and radiology.

In 1975–1980, under Sharashidze's direct leadership cytological laboratories were established throughout the Republic of Georgia (Kutaisi, Batumi etc.)

He was the first in Georgia to carry out the fundamental reorganization and diagnostical/ treatment improverent in the field of Oncology, he established the advance oncology service by creating a network of newly opened oncology profile dispensaries and outpatient clinics in most of the regions of Georgia. With his efforts, a new era of scientific approach to the research, prevention, diagnoses and treatment of oncological patients began in Georgia.

From 1960 to 1988, he was the only Georgian and Soviet scientist who participated and made scientific speeches and presentations in all Union and international world conferences, symposiums and congresses of pathomorphologists, cytohistochemists and oncologists in Russian and English languages (Poland, Russia, Romania, Yugoslavia, France, Germany, Japan, USA, Argentina and others).

Sharashidze was the author of 10 monographs and about 300 scientific works in Georgian, Russian, English and French, and conductor of 58 candidate and 20 doctoral theses. He created a large scientific school of doctors; his disciples successfully led a number of scientific research institutions in medical universities.

== Personal life ==
In his personal life, he wrote poems, painted, was passionate about football and chess. He was married twice; he married Tinatin Vatsadze (1923–2008), a professor and doctor of medical sciences, in 1944. The couple divorced in 1946 after having one child, Giorgi Sharashidze (1945–2015), who also became a doctor. His second marriage was to doctor and professor Rusudan Bulusashvili (1928–2021) in 1954. The couple had two daughters, Manana Sharashidze (b. 1955) and Maya Sharashidze (1958).

He died of a heart attack on 7 February 1991 at the age of 68 at his desk, while working with his microscope. He is buried in Saburtalo Pantheon of Scientists and Public Figures in Tbilisi.

== Legacy ==
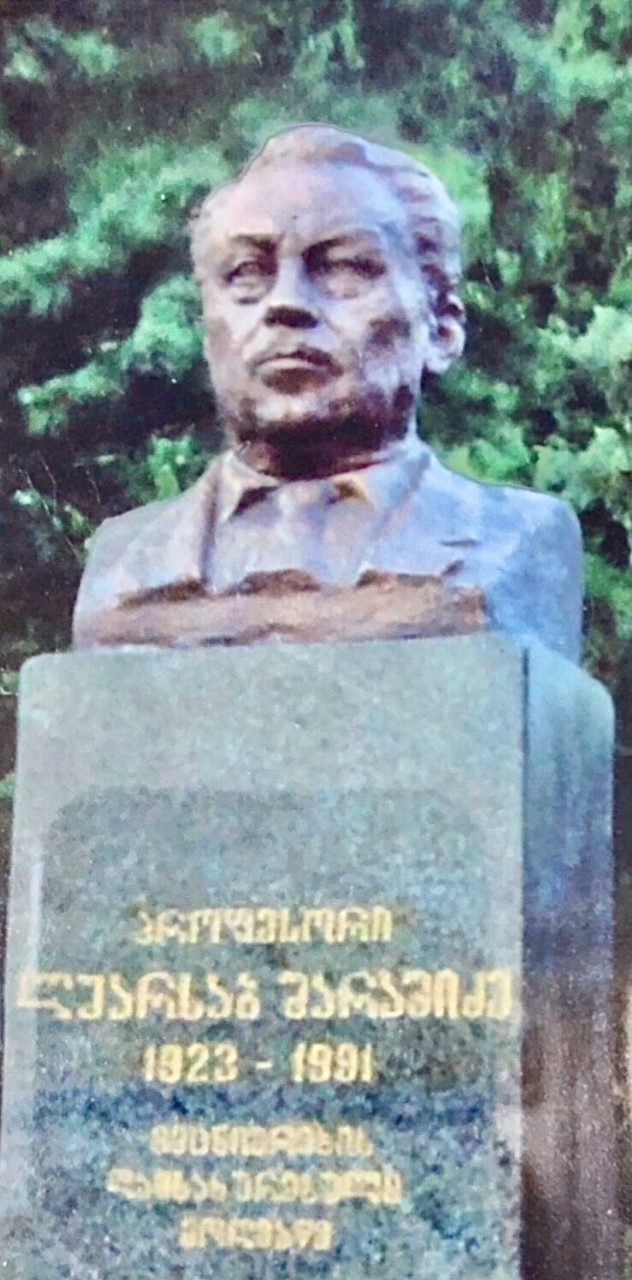
Luarsab Sharashidze bust

In 1992, a memorial board was installed at his house, where he was born, lived and worked until his death, at No. 7 I Nikoladze Lane in Pikris Gora, Tbilisi. That same year, the street on which his home sat was named after him, becoming known as Luarsab Sharashidze street, The same year was made of his memorial plaque.

In 2004, his bust was erected in the courtyard of the Georgian Oncology Scientific Centre.

In 2019, his bust was erected at his home on Luarsab Sharashidze Street, in a small square.

== Bibliography ==
- Georgian Soviet Encyclopedia, Vol. 10, Vol., 1986. — p. 685.
- Newspaper "Republic of Georgia" No. 27, 1991.
- Magazine "Georgian Medical Reporter" No. 6, 1992.
- Newspaper "Republic of Georgia" No. 81, 1993.
- Newspaper "Republic of Georgia" No. 269, 2004.
- «Вопросы Онкологии», т. XXIX, No. 6, 1983 г.
- Luarsab Sharashidze.
