= Bagiata =

Baghiata Georgian: ბაგიათა Iron Ossetic: Бӕгъиатӕ
- Village
- Location within South Ossetia Location within Shida Kartli Location within Georgia
- Coordinates: 42°30′18″N 44°04′17″E
- Country: Georgia
- De facto state: South Ossetia (Note: South Ossetia's status is disputed. It considers itself to be an independent state, but this is recognised by only a few other countries. The Georgian government and most of the world's other states consider South Ossetia de jure a part of Georgia's territory.)
- Time zone: UTC+4 (Georgian Time)

Baghiata (Georgian: ბაგიათა; Iron Ossetic: Бӕгъиатӕ / Bæghiatæ) is a settlement in the Dzau District/Java Municipality of South Ossetia, Shida Kartli, Georgia.

== See also ==
- Dzau District
