= Tsarita =

Coordinates: 42°28′42″N 44°04′12″E

Tsarita (Georgian: წარითა) is a settlement in the Java district of South Ossetia, a region of Georgia whose sovereignty is disputed. As of 2015, the settlement had 2 residents.

== See also ==
- Dzau district
