= Raro (disambiguation) =

Raro may refer to:

- Raro, a settlement in South Ossetia, Georgia
- Raro, a New Zealand brand of drink mix
- Rarotonga, the largest and most populous of the Cook Islands
- Master Raro, a character in Robert Schumann's solo piano pieces
