= Titovka, Murmansk Oblast =

Titovka Титовка
- Railway station
- Interactive map of Titovka
- Location of Titovka Titovka (Murmansk Oblast)
- Coordinates: 69°16′05″N 31°14′21″E
- Country: Russia
- Federal subject: Murmansk Oblast
- Administrative district: Pechengsky District
- Territorial okrugSelsoviet: Korzunovsky Territorial Okrug
- Founded: 1860s

Population (2010 Census)
  - Total: 1
  - Estimate (2010): 1 (0%)

Municipal status
  - Municipal district: Pechengsky Municipal District
  - Rural settlement: Korzunovo Rural Settlement
- Time zone: UTC+3 (MSK)
- Postal code: 184410
- Dialing code: +7 81554
- OKTMO ID: 47615406121

Titovka (Russian: Титовка) is a rural locality (a railway station) in Korzunovo Rural Settlement of Pechengsky District of Murmansk Oblast, Russia, located beyond the Arctic Circle at 122 km of the Kola - Pechenga Railway (72 km from Nikel).

According to the 2010 Russian census, Titovka had only one inhabitant. At the time of the 2002 Russian census, Titovka had a population of 33, of whom 64% were ethnic Russians.

== History ==
It was founded in the 1860s—the decade when the Murman Coast was actively being settled. Train station was founded in 1955.

It is located at the former Koshka Yavr Airbase which is now closed down.
