= Kvemo Bakarta =

Coordinates: 42°29′47″N 44°02′03″E

Kvemo Bakarta or Kvemo Bakarda (Georgian: ქვემო ბაქართა; Ossetian: Дæллаг Урсдзуар, romanized: Dællag Ursdzwar) is a hamlet in the Dzau district of South Ossetia, Georgia.

== See also ==
- Dzau district
