= Khikhata =

Khikhata Georgian: ხიხათა Iron Ossetic: Хихатæ
- Interactive map of Khikhata
- Location in Georgia Khikhata (Shida Kartli) Khikhata (Georgia)
- Coordinates: 42°24′38″N 43°50′42″E
- Country: Georgia
- Mkhare: Shida Kartli
- Municipality: Java
- Community: Mskhlebi

Khikhata (Georgian: ხიხათა; Iron Ossetic: Хихатæ; Russian: Хихата) is a settlement in the Java district of South Ossetia, Georgia.

== See also ==
- Dzau district
