= Abuserisdze =

Georgian noble family

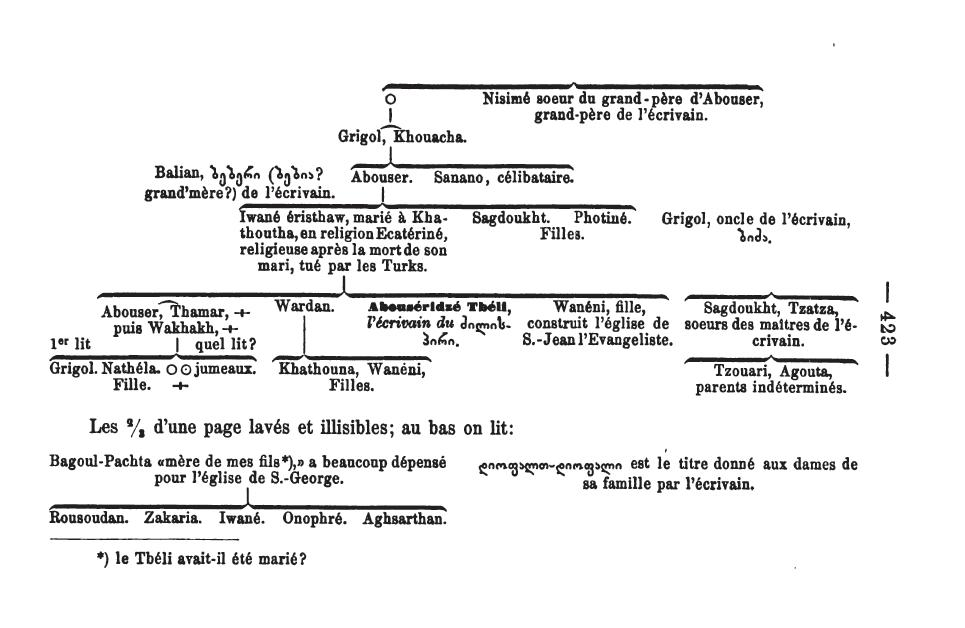
Abuserisdze family tree per Marie-Félicité Brosset, 1866

The Abuserisdze family (Georgian: აბუსერისძე) were a noble family in medieval Georgia. The first known members of the family, Ioane and his son, Abuser, served loyally to King Bagrat IV (reigned 1027–1072) as hereditary holders of Artanuji (in Klarjeti) and Khikhata (in Adjara). Abuser was also a commandant of Atskuri and Tsikhisjvari and the governor of the Armenian city of Ani. His career, as well as that of his son, Grigol, was terminated when they were taken captive by the rival Georgian warlord Liparit Baguashi in the 1040s. As a result of this setback, the family went into relative decline and was left with Khikhata only, but still remained active up to the 16th century when the Abuserisdzes are recorded for the last time in the list of Samtskhe-Saatabago nobility. A notable scholar Tbeli Abuserisdze (c. 1190–1240) and amirspasalar (commander-in-chief) Ivane (died 1355) also belonged to this family.
