= Sidani =

Coordinates: 42°27′49″N 44°03′40″E

Sidani (Georgian: სიდანი; Ossetian: Сидæн) is a settlement in the Java district of South Ossetia, Georgia.

== See also ==
- Dzau district
