= Cola (disambiguation) =

Cola is a type of soft drink.

Cola may also refer to:

== Arts and media ==
- "Cola" (Lana Del Rey song), 2012 song by Lana Del Rey
- "Cola" (CamelPhat and Elderbrook song), a 2017 song by CamelPhat and Elderbrook
- Cola (band), a Montreal post-punk band

== Biology ==
- Cola (moth), a genus of moths of the family Erebidae
- Cola (plant), the genus of plants from which the kola nut is harvested
  - The kola nut
- a tight cluster of buds, as in the colas of a female cannabis plant

== Other uses ==
- Cola (name), a surname and given name
- the plural of Colon (rhetoric), a rhetorical figure, or of Colon (punctuation)
- Cathedral of Our Lady of the Angels, Roman Catholic cathedral in Los Angeles, California
- Cost-of-living adjustment, adjustment of salaries based on changes in a cost-of-living index
- "Piano de cola", Spanish for "grand piano"
- Columbia, South Carolina, nicknamed Cola Town
- Collision On Launch Assessment, an assessment made on the launch of a payload to space that the launch vehicle or spacecraft might collide with other artificial satellites or space debris during the launch and initial deployment

== See also ==
- Coke (disambiguation)
- Kola (disambiguation)
- Koala
