= Tsamadi =

Coordinates: 42°27′24″N 43°54′09″E

Tsamadi (Georgian: წამადი; Ossetian: Цъамад) is a settlement in the Java district of South Ossetia, a region of Georgia whose sovereignty is disputed. As of 2015, Tsamadi only had 1 resident.

== See also ==
- Dzau district
