= Rokata =

Settlement in the Java district of South Ossetia

Coordinates: 42°25′51″N 44°01′52″E

Rokata (Georgian: როკათა) is a village in the Java district of South Ossetia, Georgia. It is located in the center of the country, situated on the Liakhvi river.

== See also ==
- Dzau district
