= Colasanti =

Colasanti is a surname of Italian origin. It is derived from the given name Cola, which is in turn a nickname for the given name Nicola. It is most present in the Italian region Lazio.

Notable people with the surname include:

- Arduino Colasanti (1877–1935), Italian Renaissance scholar
- Marina Colasanti (1937–2025), Italian-Brazilian writer, translator, and journalist
- Maurizio Colasanti, Italian conductor
- Susane Colasanti (born 1973), American novelist
- Veniero Colasanti (1910–1996), Italian costume designer, set decorator, and art director
