= Bajigata =

Bajigata Georgian: ბაჯიგათა Iron Ossetic: Бадзыгат
- Village
- Location within South Ossetia Location within Shida Kartli Location within Georgia
- Coordinates: 42°28′28″N 44°06′18″E
- Country: Georgia
- De facto state: South Ossetia (Note: South Ossetia's status is disputed. It considers itself to be an independent state, but this is recognised by only a few other countries. The Georgian government and most of the world's other states consider South Ossetia de jure a part of Georgia's territory.)
- Time zone: UTC+4 (Georgian Time)

Bajigata or Badzhigat (Georgian: ბაჯიგათა; Iron Ossetic: Бадзыгат) is a settlement in the Dzau district of South Ossetia, Georgia.

== See also ==
- Dzau district
