= Badila Gagiev =

- Гæджиты Бадила
- Born: 5 August 1891; Styrmasyg, Kutaisi Governorate, Russian Empire
- Died: 1937 (aged 45–46); Soviet Union
- Military career
- Allegiance: Russian SFSR; Soviet Union
- Branch: Red Army
- Service years: 1907–1921
- Rank: Commander Regiment and South Ossetian partisans
- Commands: 293rd Rifle Regiment; 77th Rifle Regiment
- Conflicts: Russian Civil War; Ukrainian Civil War; Kharkiv Operation (December 1919) (1919); Burgustan rescue (1920); Sovietization of Georgia; Mamison Pass crossing (1921); Capture of Oni (1921); Battle of Kutaisi (1921); Soviet capture of Batumi (1921); South Ossetia conflict (1918–1921); Battle of Kudar gorge (1921)
- Awards: Order of the Red Banner (twice)

Badila Gulaevich Gagiev (Iron Ossetic: Гæджиты Гулайы фырт Бадила; Russian: Бадила Гулаевич Гагиев; 23 July [O.S. 5 August] 1891 – 1937), also known as Georgy Gabaev (Russian: Георгий Габаев), was an Ossetian revolutionary, Red Army commander, and a hero of the Russian Civil War. He was the first Ossetian to be awarded the Order of the Red Banner twice.

== Early life ==
Gagiev was born on 5 August 1891 (23 July, Old Style) in the village of Styrmasyg in the Kudar Gorge, then part of the Kutaisi Governorate of the Russian Empire (now in South Ossetia). His father, Gula, worked as a laborer for Georgian princes, while his mother, Sanet, was a peasant. The family lived in extreme poverty, without land of their own, and slept on straw around a hearth. At age 12, Gagiev's elder sister committed suicide after being forced into an unhappy marriage—an event that profoundly affected him.

When Gagiev was young, his father Gula was severely beaten and blinded by a Georgian prince for failing to pay a debt. The young Badila witnessed this and swore revenge. He later tracked down the prince, learned the Georgian language, and worked in his household to find the right moment for vengeance.

In 1900, at the age of 9, Gagiev went to Georgia to work as a laborer and learn the Georgian language. He worked for several employers, including Vladimir Chkheidze, a tax inspector who paid him 3 rubles per month and taught him to read and write Georgian. In 1907, he sold 16 bulls in Kutaisi but did not receive full payment, preventing him from returning home.

== Revolutionary activities ==
In Tiflis, Gagiev worked for General Rakhmanov and later as a boy at the "London" hotel. In 1907, he was adopted by Colonel's widow Varvara Valerianovna Gabaeva, who gave him the name Georgy Gabaev and enrolled him in the Tiflis Junker School. Through his brother Biaslan, who worked at the "Trud" tavern, Gagiev met underground revolutionaries, including Ilike Kereselidze and others associated with the Socialist Revolutionary Party.

In 1907, Gagiev was chosen by lot to assassinate Agent Petrov, a secret police informant. He shot Petrov on Okhnetnaya Street in Tiflis and successfully escaped. In 1908, he was arrested in St. Petersburg and, after confessing to the killing, was sentenced to hard labor instead of execution due to his adoptive mother's influence and his age (he was 18). He was sent to Siberia in chains and released in late 1913 after a general amnesty.

== World War I and the October Revolution ==
In 1914, Gagiev was mobilized into the Imperial Russian Army and fought on the Austrian front. In 1915, he intentionally wounded himself to leave the front and returned to St. Petersburg.

During the October Revolution, Gagiev participated in the seizure of weapons from the Khamovniki barracks in Moscow and was wounded on the Arbat. He joined the Bolshevik Party in 1917 after meeting Yakov Sverdlov.

== Russian Civil War ==
In 1918–1919, Gagiev commanded Red Army units in Ukraine, including the 2nd Proletarian Regiment. He fought against the White forces of Anton Denikin. In 1919, during the retreat from Kharkov, he was captured by the Whites. He refused to cooperate with counterintelligence and was sentenced to execution. During the execution, he escaped and hid in a sewer, later being rescued by advancing Red Army troops.

== Caucasian Front and the invasion of Georgia ==
In 1920, Gagiev was appointed commander of the 293rd Regiment. In February 1921, his regiment made a heroic winter crossing of the Mamison Pass into Western Georgia during the Red Army invasion of Georgia. With 60 fighters, he disarmed a Menshevik detachment and captured the city of Oni. In the battle near Kutaisi, his regiment defeated General Mikashavidze's forces, capturing 74 armored vehicles, 12 artillery pieces, and 36 machine guns, and 3800 Georgians. For these actions, he was awarded the Order of the Red Banner and appointed head of the Black Sea coast.

== Rescue of the 2nd South Ossetian Brigade at Burgustan ==
In September 1920, the 2nd South Ossetian Brigade (about 1,500 men) was surrounded by three cavalry regiments of White Guards near the village of Burgustanskaya (now in Stavropol Krai). The brigade suffered heavy losses—about 1,333 men were killed, of whom around 600 were natives of South Ossetia. Brigade commander Yany-shevsky was later executed for treason.

A cavalry regiment of the 11th Red Army, commanded by Badila Gagiev, arrived to relieve the brigade. His forces defeated the White Guards and freed the prisoners.

== Post-war activities and work in Nogir ==
After the Civil War, Gagiev worked on resettling refugees from South Ossetia in North Ossetia. He participated in founding the village of Nogir in 1920.

In 1923, a band of 24 armed raiders from the Ingush region attacked Nogir and stole 120 horses. Gagiev, who led the local self-defense forces, organized a pursuit. His detachment killed six raiders and recovered all the stolen livestock.

He later worked as director of a shoe factory and was involved in suppressing banditry in Chechnya. He was awarded a second Order of the Red Banner for his service.

== Death and rehabilitation ==
In 1937, during the Great Purge, Gagiev was arrested and executed. He was posthumously rehabilitated in 1956 following the 20th Congress of the CPSU.

== Legacy ==
A monument to Gagiev stands in Kvaisa, South Ossetia. His autobiography was first published in 2002 in the journal Darial, and a comprehensive book about his life, The Roads of Life and Struggle of Badila Gagiev, was published in 2023.

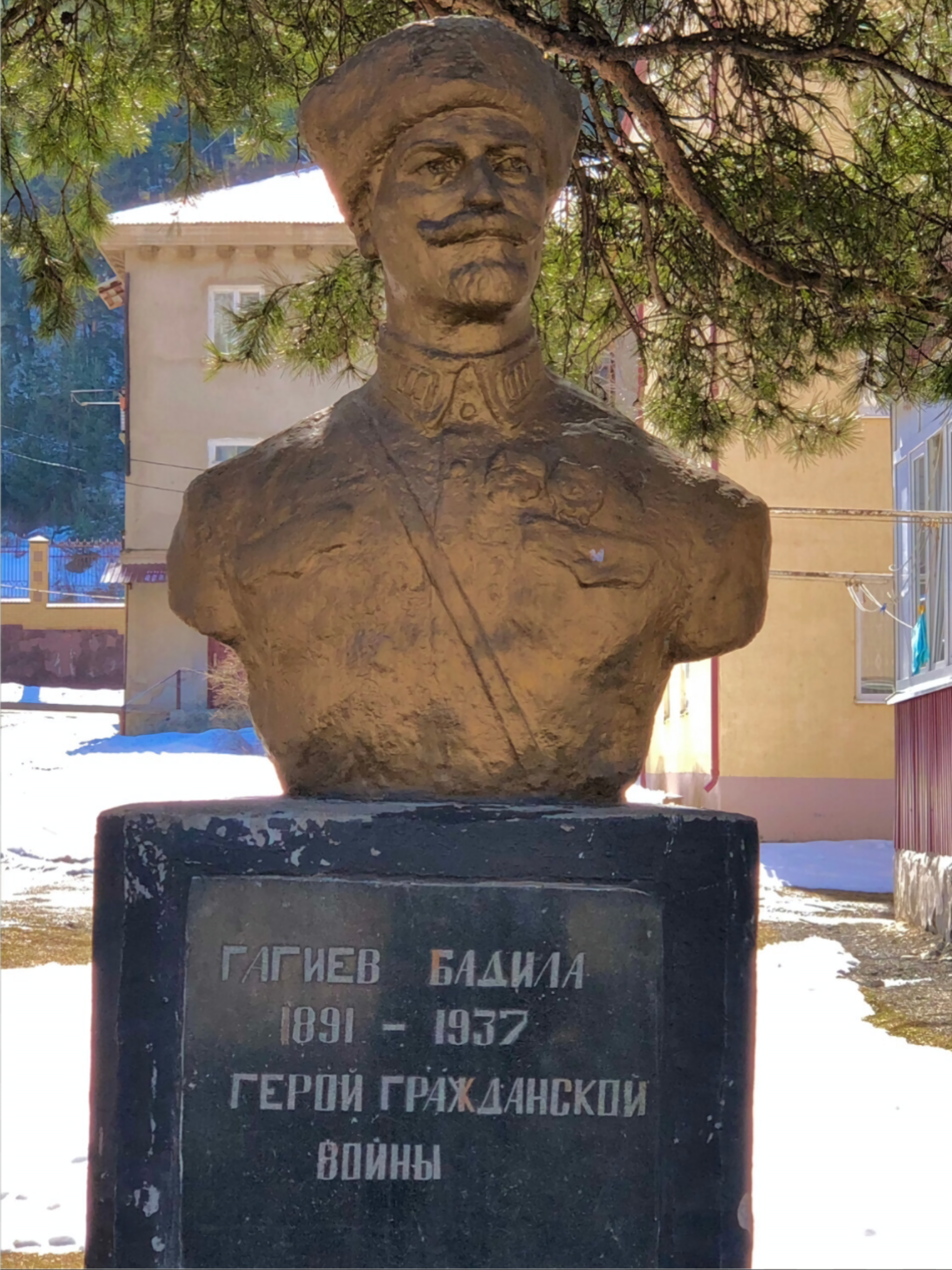
Badila Gagiev monument in Kvaisa, South Ossetia
