= Litsi =

Coordinates: 42°29′51″N 44°04′48″E

Litsi (Georgian: ლიწი; Ossetian: Лицъи) is a settlement in the Java district of South Ossetia, Georgia.

== See also ==
- Dzau district
