= Keshelta =

Coordinates: 42°28′30″N 43°55′22″E

Keshelta or Cheselt (Georgian: ქეშელთა; Ossetian: Чеселт) is a settlement in the Dzau district of South Ossetia, Georgia.

== See also ==
- Dzau district
