= Chrdilo Chiprani =

Settlement in South Ossetia, Georgia

Coordinates: 42°27′47″N 44°04′58″E

Chrdilo Chiprani (Georgian: ჩრდილო ჩიფრანი, Ossetian: Цӕгат Ципран, Tsægat Tsipran) is a settlement in the Dzau district of South Ossetia, Georgia. As of 2015, the settlement was home to 4 people.

== See also ==
- Dzau district
