= Shiboita =

Coordinates: 42°28′12″N 43°51′21″E

Shiboita (Georgian: შიბოითა; Ossetian: Шибойыхъæу; Russian: Цибойта) is a settlement in the Java district of South Ossetia, Georgia.

== See also ==
- Dzau district
