= Sikhta =

Coordinates: 42°27′09″N 43°53′20″E

Sikhta or Silga (Georgian: სიხთა, სიხდთა; Ossetian: Сигъдтæ, romanized: Syghdtæ; Russian: Сыхдта, Сигдта) is a settlement in the Java district of South Ossetia, a region of Georgia whose sovereignty is disputed.

== See also ==
- Dzau district
