= Tbeli Abuserisdze =

Georgian scholar and writer (c. 1190–1240)

Georgian scholar and religious writer
- Born: c.1190
- Died: 1240
- Venerated in: Georgian Orthodox Church
- Feast: 17 August

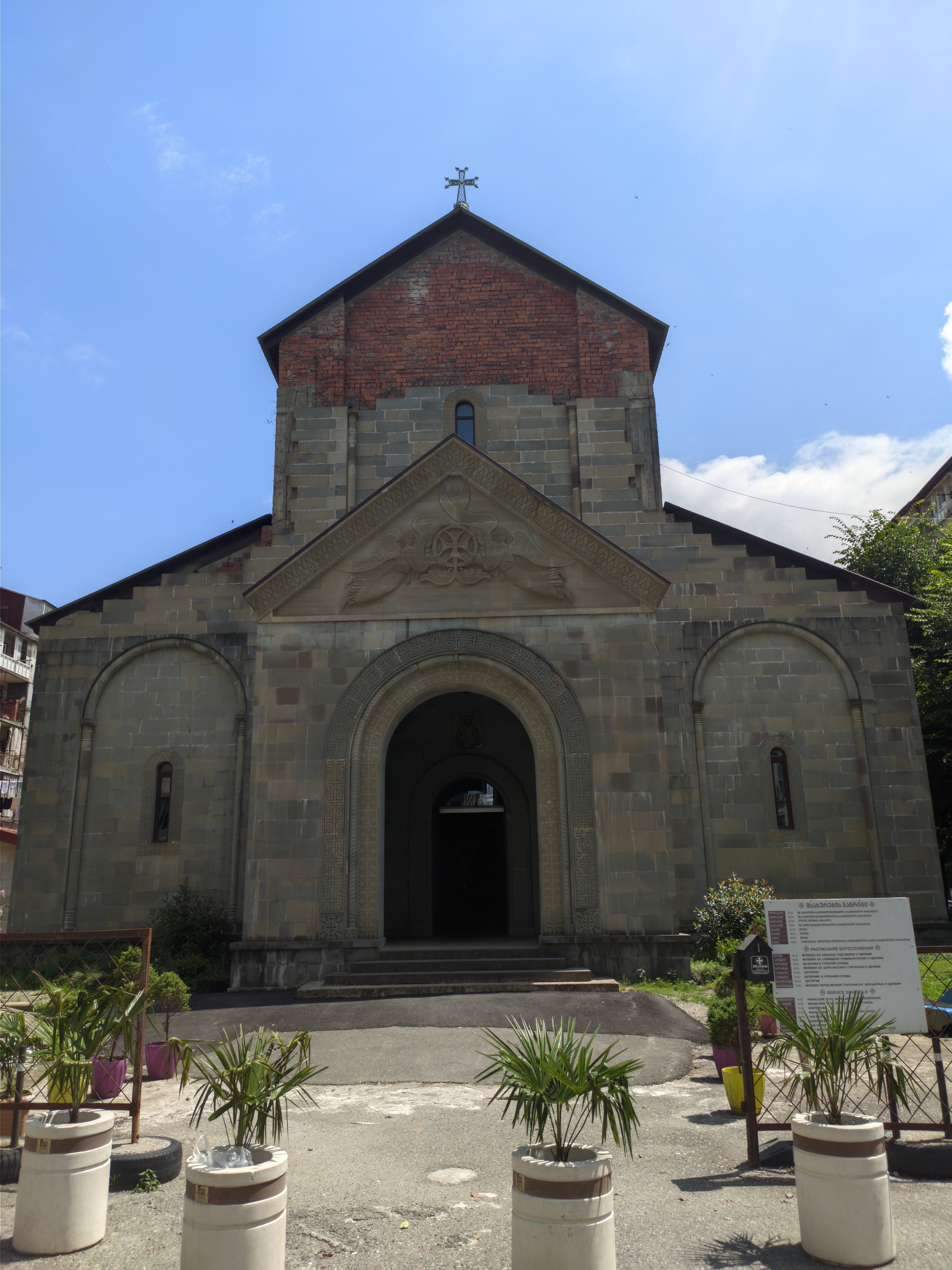
Saint Tbeli Abuserisdze Orthodox Church of Batumi

Tbeli Abuserisdze (Georgian: ტბელი აბუსერისძე) (c. 1190 – 1240) was a medieval Georgian scholar and religious writer.

== Biography ==
A son of Ivane Abuserisdze, eristavt-eristavi ("archduke") of Khikhata (Upper Adjara, southwestern Georgia), he is principally known for his original treatise, The Complete Timekeeper, which contains information related to calendars, descriptions of different systems for maintaining chronology, dates of ecclesiastic holidays, tables of moonrise and moonset, information on special cycles, etc. Abuserisdze's work is purely theoretical, based largely upon his own mathematical investigations rather than on direct astronomical observations.

Beyond this treatise, he authored The Miracles of Saint George... and the Testament of the Author, a work of religious as well as of historical character, in which he relates, among other things, the history of the Abuserisdze family. The religious-historical work describes the construction activities of the Ajarian farmers, the art of the Kalatozi, the Potsk-Basil construction. It contains the Abouserdester's family of mathematics, as well as important information about the life and morals of that time, as well as the data of specific historical character. The chronological-astronomical treatise is an extensive cell reference that describes the advantages and disadvantages of different systems of the cycling system and provides a set of pilgrimages and lunar arrivals.

== Recognition ==
He has been canonized by the Georgian Orthodox Church. His feast day is on 17 August.

== Sources ==
- Machitadze, Archpriest Zakaria (2002), Saint Tbeli Abuserisdze. The Lives of the Georgian Saints.
- Abuselidze, Giorgi (2004), South-Western Georgia of Tbel Abuserisdze Epoch (Economic Situation). Tbilisi: Metsniereba, ISBN 99928-0-811-X.
