= Chagata =

Settlement in South Ossetia, Georgia

Coordinates: 42°28′16″N 43°55′41″E

Chagata (Georgian: ჩიგათა; Ossetian: Цæгат) is a settlement in the Java district of South Ossetia, Georgia.

== See also ==
- Dzau district
