= Lower Paleolithic in Georgia (country) =

Lower Paleolithic archaeology of Georgia

The Lower Paleolithic is the earliest documented phase of human occupation in the territory of modern Georgia. Its archaeological record begins about 1.8 million years ago at the Dmanisi site, where stone artifacts and fossils of early Homo provide one of the earliest securely dated records of hominins outside Africa.

After the Early Pleistocene occupations of the Dmanisi region, securely dated evidence remains sparse until the Middle Pleistocene, when Acheulean assemblages are documented at high-altitude caves in the central Greater Caucasus. At Kudaro III, layer 8a yielded a small assemblage assigned to the Acheulean and a single thermoluminescence date of 560 ± 112 thousand years ago; the limited material and single date leave its chronology uncertain. Acheulean occupation is more securely documented at Kudaro I between approximately 360,000 and 245,000 years ago. Tsona has no direct numerical date and is placed around 350,000 years ago through comparison with Kudaro I. The open-air sites of Ziari preserve flake-and-core assemblages without bifacial handaxes, differing technologically from the handaxe-bearing cave assemblages.

== Early and Middle Pleistocene environments ==
Selected Lower Paleolithic archaeological localities in Georgia. Numbers identify locations, not chronological order.
1. Dmanisi; 2. Kvemo Orozmani; 3. Kudaro; 4. Tsona; 5. Ziari.

Environmental evidence associated with the Georgian Lower Paleolithic is geographically and chronologically uneven. The Early Pleistocene is best documented around Dmanisi and Orozmani in southern Georgia, whereas evidence associated with the Middle Pleistocene Acheulean comes principally from the high-altitude caves of Kudaro and Tsona.

=== Early Pleistocene ===
Plant remains from the lower deposits at Dmanisi and Orozmani indicate a temperate landscape combining grassland and woodland under relatively warm and humid conditions. Pollen from the lower Orozmani sequence represents oak–hornbeam woodland, riverside forest containing wingnut, and higher forests containing chestnut and beech. Phytoliths—microscopic silica bodies formed in plants—show that both temperate and warmth-adapted grasses were present.

Near the end of the Olduvai subchron, about 1.78 million years ago, the plant evidence records reduced rainfall and expanding open vegetation. Warmth-adapted grasses declined, while indicators of water stress increased. During the documented hominin occupation, grasses and other plants adapted to dry conditions dominated locally, although woodland remained in the surrounding region and on higher ground. Messager and colleagues reconstructed a warm, relatively dry steppe-forest. Although its open structure resembled African savanna environments, the identified plants were predominantly temperate Eurasian species.

Small mammals, amphibians and reptiles support this reconstruction. Dry open ground and rocky or bushy terrain occurred alongside wetlands, streams and other permanent bodies of water, with limited woodland and gallery forest nearby. The amphibian and reptile assemblage indicates a warm, seasonally dry climate broadly comparable to that of the modern Mediterranean. Estimates based on the climatic ranges of related living species produced a mean annual temperature of about 13.1 °C (55.6 °F) and annual precipitation of approximately 635 millimetres (25.0 in).

=== Middle Pleistocene ===
Environmental evidence associated with the later Lower Paleolithic comes principally from the Acheulean deposits of Kudaro and Tsona. These caves lie on the southern slopes of the Greater Caucasus at elevations between approximately 1,500 to 2,100 metres (4,900 to 6,900 ft). Their pollen and animal remains record several changes in local conditions rather than a single Middle Pleistocene environment.

Pollen from Kudaro I layer 5 records alternating climatic phases. Cold conditions at the top of sublevel 5v were followed by a climatic optimum. The base of sublevel 5b was humid and predominantly forested, resembling modern Colchic forest, whereas its upper part was warm and dry and contained plants associated with steppe and savanna environments. The base of sublevel 5a was cold, followed by temperate and then cooler conditions. At Tsona, rodents indicate warm and dry conditions, while pollen places the cave within an upper forest belt, with conifers and deciduous trees growing on the surrounding slopes.

Mgeladze and Moncel concluded that the Acheulean occupations of Kudaro and Tsona occurred during temperate intervals, when high mountain valleys were accessible from the lower plateaus and a larger area of the Greater Caucasus was available to hominin groups. They contrasted this with glacial periods, when the available highland territory contracted. These environmental reconstructions remain broadly dated: Tsona's Acheulean levels have no numerical age, while the dating estimates for Kudaro I layer 5 have wide uncertainty ranges.

== Early Pleistocene occupation ==
=== Dmanisi ===
Dmanisi hominin skull D4500 and mandible D2600 at the National Museum of Georgia

Stone artifacts from Dmanisi at the National Museum of Georgia

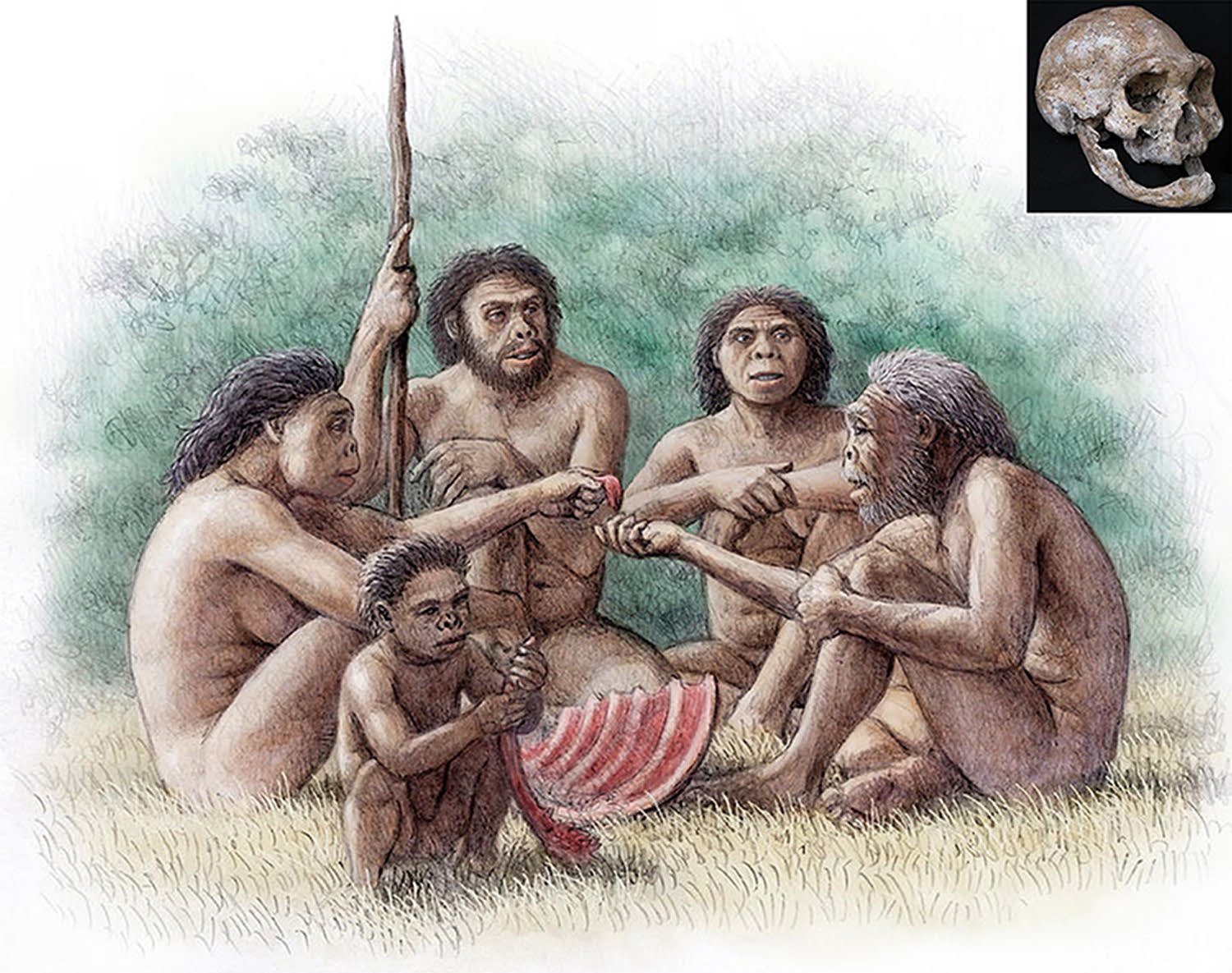
Mauricio Antón's reconstruction of the Dmanisi hominins (2021)

Dmanisi lies on a promontory above the confluence of the Mashavera and Pinezauri rivers in southern Georgia. Its Paleolithic deposits accumulated on a basalt platform beneath the later medieval town and are divided into Strata A and B. Stone artifacts occur at several levels in Stratum A, recording repeated visits rather than a single occupation. In 2011 these levels were dated to between 1.85 and 1.78 million years ago; direct dating of the uppermost basalt beneath them later refined the interval to approximately 1.80–1.78 million years ago. Stratum B accumulated after a reversal of Earth's magnetic field. Its lowest division, B1, contains most of the animal fossils and all hominin remains recovered from the principal excavation blocks, deposited around 1.77 million years ago.

Nearly 80 hominin fossils representing at least five individuals have been reported. They include five crania, mandibles, isolated teeth and bones from the rest of the skeleton. The fossils combine small cranial capacities and anatomically primitive traits with features associated with early Homo erectus. Their classification remains disputed. Vekua and colleagues assigned a cranium and mandible described in 2002 to early Homo, noting affinities with both H. habilis and H. erectus. A later study of the complete fifth skull argued that the variation among the Dmanisi individuals could fall within a single evolving lineage of early Homo, which the authors placed within H. erectus. A 2025 analysis of tooth-crown dimensions instead supported the presence of two taxa, previously named H. georgicus and H. caucasi, while acknowledging that a single-species interpretation could not be excluded if differences between the sexes were comparable to those of living great apes.

The Dmanisi stone industry belongs to Mode 1 and is technologically comparable to the African Oldowan. An analysis of material excavated through 2006 included more than 8,000 objects. The assemblage consists mainly of flakes, cores and core-choppers; deliberately retouched pieces are rare, and bifacial handaxes are absent. Basalt, fine-grained volcanic tuff and andesite were the principal raw materials. Cobbles and angular stone blocks were collected from nearby riverbeds and rock exposures, and flakes and manufacturing debris show that stone was worked at the site.

The dense concentrations of animal bones in B1 resulted from several processes rather than a single hunting or occupation event. Hyenas and large cats accumulated or modified many remains, while other animals died naturally. Stone-tool marks occur on less than 0.5 percent of the examined medium- and large-mammal assemblage but demonstrate that hominins processed several kinds of animals. Some marks indicate access to limbs while substantial flesh remained, whereas others are consistent with scavenging.

=== Orozmani ===
Kvemo Orozmani lies in the Mashavera drainage west of Dmanisi. Its approximately 15-meter sedimentary sequence is enclosed between two lava flows dated to approximately 1.825 and 1.765 million years ago. Correlation of this sequence with Dmanisi provided an independent chronological and environmental framework for the latter site.

A preliminary report on excavations begun in 2020 described Oldowan-like artifacts, fossils of carnivores and hoofed mammals, and a hominin tooth at Kvemo Orozmani. The authors reported the archaeological deposits as roughly contemporary with Dmanisi and presented Orozmani as a second Early Pleistocene hominin-bearing locality in the South Caucasus.

== Middle Pleistocene industries ==
A long chronological gap separates Dmanisi and Orozmani from the later Lower Paleolithic record characterized by Acheulean stone tools. Paleontological localities at Tsalka and Akhalkalaki, dated by their animal fossils to around one million years ago, fall within the intervening period but have not supplied archaeological evidence of hominin occupation.

=== Acheulean cave sites ===
Handaxes from Tsona at the National Museum of Georgia

The principal stratified evidence of Acheulean technology in Georgia comes from the caves of Kudaro I, Kudaro III and Tsona, situated on the southern slopes of the central Greater Caucasus at elevations between approximately 1,500 to 2,100 metres (4,900 to 6,900 ft). Handaxes, cleavers and other large bifacial tools are well represented at Kudaro I and Tsona, contrasting with the Mode 1 technology documented at Dmanisi; the evidence from Kudaro III is more limited. Most other Georgian localities attributed to the Acheulean are open-air sites with limited stratigraphic or chronological control.

Kudaro III layer 8a yielded a sparse assemblage attributed to the Acheulean and a single thermoluminescence date of 560 ± 112 thousand years ago. Tushabramishvili regarded this age as problematic because it rests on one date and limited archaeological material. Acheulean occupation is more securely documented in Kudaro I layer 5, whose sublevels produced dates ranging from approximately 360,000 to 245,000 years ago. Tsona has no direct numerical date and is tentatively placed around 350,000 years ago through comparison with Kudaro I.

Kudaro I preserves a comparatively extensive record of stone working. Layer 5 contains flakes, cores, pebble tools, handaxes, a cleaver and locally distinctive large tools known as tsaldi. Schistose rocks, sandstone and other materials available near the cave dominate the assemblage, although some flint was obtained from farther away. Abundant cores and flakes indicate that much of the flake production occurred at the site. Large bifacial tools were made from pebbles, flakes and slabs, primarily using local stone; they include triangular and heart-shaped forms with varying degrees of shaping.

The Tsona assemblage consists mainly of bifacial implements, cleavers, other heavy-duty tools and selected flake tools. Very few flakes were recovered, and the authors found no clear evidence of core reduction inside the cave, although four indeterminate core fragments were reported. Mgeladze and Moncel therefore concluded that most tools were produced elsewhere and carried into the cave. Broken implements were not generally reshaped, and missing fragments indicate that some tools may subsequently have been removed. These features are consistent with brief, specialized visits, whereas the more complete production sequence at Kudaro I indicates longer or more varied activity.

Mgeladze and Moncel interpreted raw-material procurement as evidence of movement between lower plateaus and high mountain valleys. Most stone was collected near the caves; some flint—including red and pink varieties absent around Kudaro I—may have come from the Kvirila valley approximately 35 kilometres (22 mi) to the south. The researchers interpreted the cave occupations as evidence that Acheulean groups extended their territories into high mountain valleys during temperate intervals. They considered the Levant a possible source of the bifacial tradition, followed by the development of regional forms, while emphasizing the scarcity of securely dated comparative sites.

=== Ziari and non-biface industries ===
Ziari I and II are open-air sites in Kakheti, eastern Georgia. Their Lower Paleolithic assemblages differ from the handaxe-bearing industries of Kudaro and Tsona. Ziari I contains eight identified sedimentary layers and three archaeological groupings: a Lower Paleolithic assemblage without bifaces, material described by its excavator as "Clactonian-style" and an overlying Mousterian component. Clactonian is a traditional term for European flake-and-core assemblages lacking handaxes. The artifacts at Ziari were made principally from locally available limestone and flint. Tushabramishvili tentatively placed the exposed Lower Paleolithic levels of Ziari I between approximately 424,000 and 374,000 years ago, following an earlier assignment by Tamaz Bugianishvili to the former “Mindel–Riss interstadial” chronology. This estimate is relative: no absolute dates were available, and excavation had not reached bedrock.

Ziari II lies approximately 300 metres (980 ft) from Ziari I, beside an outcrop that supplied limestone for toolmaking. Tushabramishvili interpreted it as a workshop where locally available stone was reduced. Its assemblage includes pebble tools, cores and flakes but no established series of Acheulean bifaces. Ziari II also lacks an absolute chronology, and its relationship to the successive industries at Ziari I remains uncertain. Tushabramishvili interpreted the Ziari sites as evidence that non-biface flake-and-core technologies were also present in Middle Pleistocene eastern Georgia.

== South Caucasian context ==
Georgia's Lower Paleolithic record forms a central part of a wider but chronologically uneven South Caucasian sequence. Sagona distinguishes two broad technological traditions in the Caucasian Lower Paleolithic: pebble choppers and flakes, represented at Dmanisi, and Acheulean industries characterized by bifacial tools.

Sites in Armenia provide the closest regional comparisons. Presnyakov and colleagues identified Karakhach as an Early Acheulean site and dated its ash-bearing sequence to approximately 1.85–1.77 million years ago; Belyaeva and Shchelinsky likewise classified its lithic industry as Acheulean. At Kurtan I, an ash layer dated to 1.432 ± 0.028 million years ago underlies paleosols containing artifacts attributed to the Early–Middle Acheulean. The date therefore constrains the beginning of occupation rather than directly dating every artifact-bearing deposit.

Later Armenian sites include Hatis-1, where an obsidian assemblage with bifaces and large-flake tools has been classified as Late Acheulean. The deposits lack direct chronometric dates, although geological evidence places them after approximately 700,000–480,000 years ago. Nor Geghi 1 has a firmer Middle Pleistocene chronology and preserves the contemporaneous use of bifacial and Levallois methods approximately 335,000–325,000 years ago. At Dalarik-1, recent geological work established a volcanic and river-incision context for Lower Paleolithic artifacts deposited after the cave formed.

In Azerbaijan, Azykh Cave provides a stratified comparison with the later Georgian record. Its Unit V has differing age estimates: uranium-series dating indicated about 200,000 years, amino-acid racemization suggested an age nearer 300,000 years, and electron-spin-resonance dating produced an estimate of 293 ± 23 thousand years. The unit contains a flake-dominated assemblage whose assignment to the Acheulean, Mousterian or a local tradition known as the Kudarian remains uncertain. Unit II contains a substantial Levallois component and is more securely associated with Mode 3 or the Mousterian.
