= Kvemo Machkhara =

Coordinates: 42°29′01″N 43°51′25″E

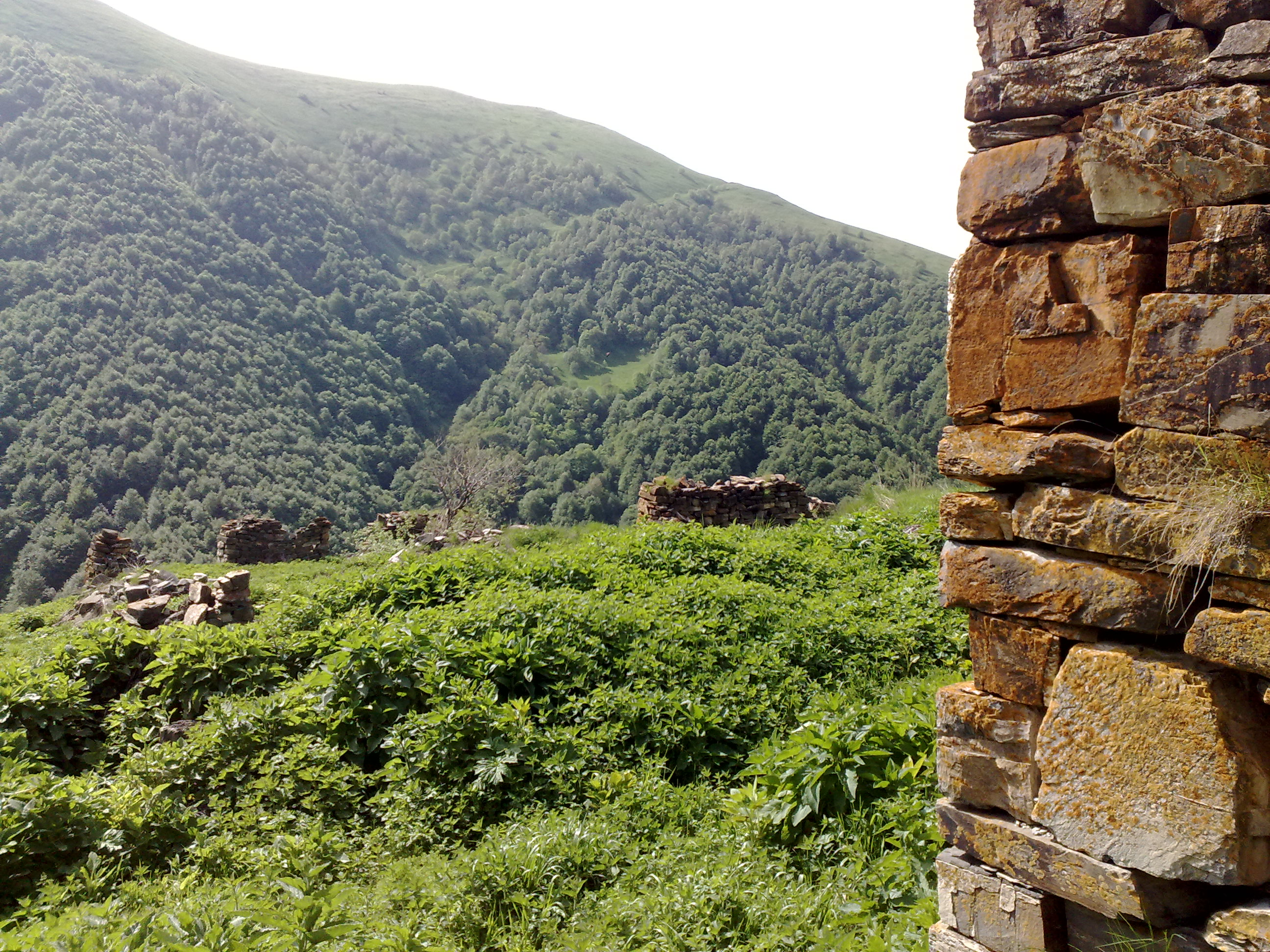

Kvemo Machkhara (Georgian: ქვემო მაჩხარა; Ossetian: Мацхара; Russian: Нижняя Мацхара) former settlement in the Java district of South Ossetia, Georgia. Presently ruins remain.

== See also ==
- Dzau district
