= Zapolyarny, Murmansk Oblast =

Town in Murmansk Oblast, Russia

Zapolyarny Заполярный Zapoljarnyj (Norwegian)
- Town
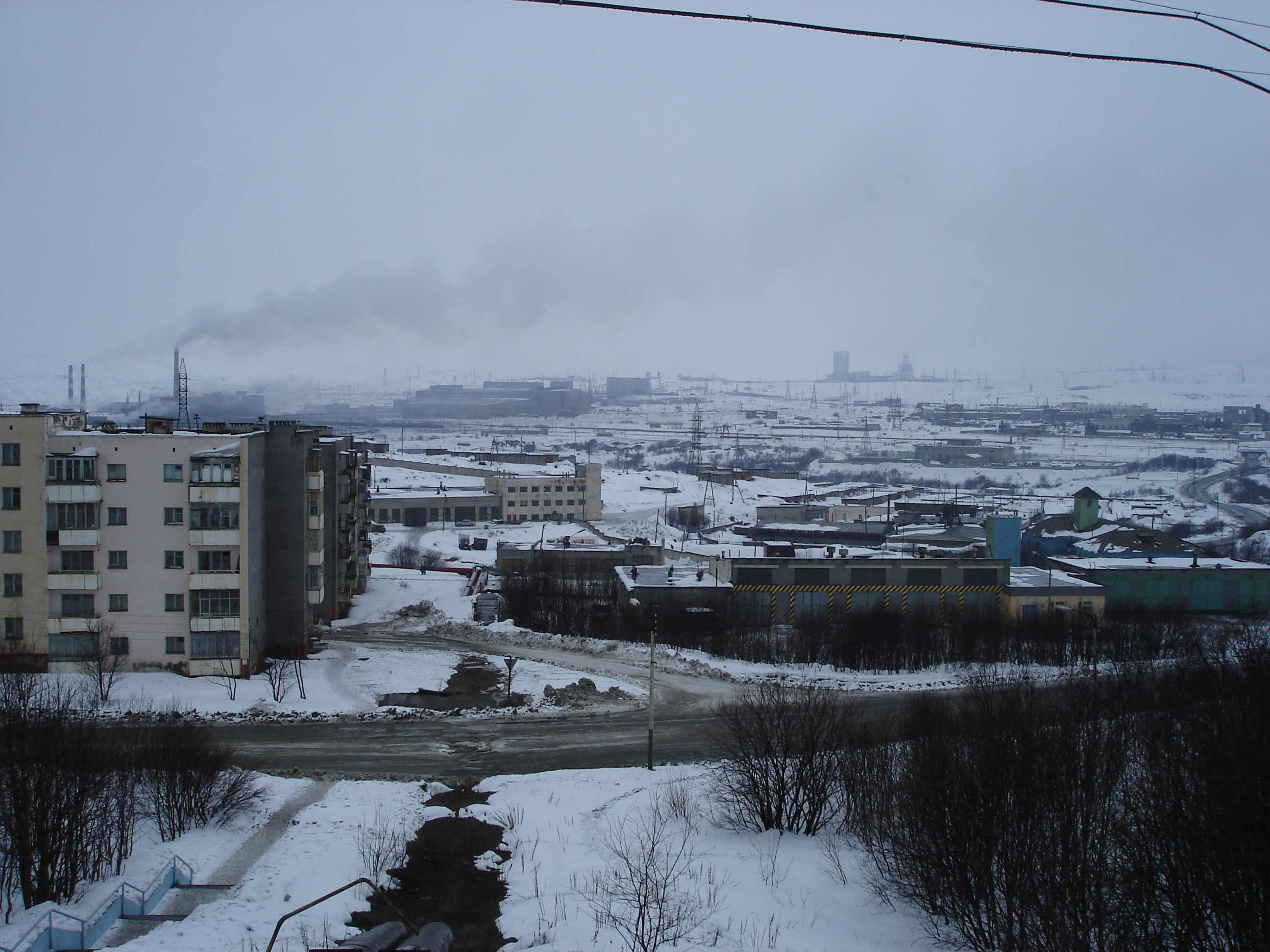
- View of Zapolyarny

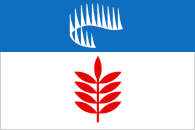
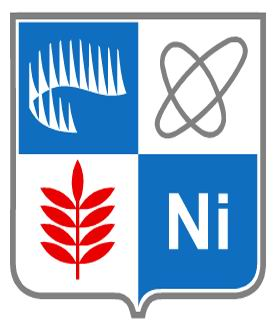
- Flag Coat of arms
- Interactive map of Zapolyarny
- Location of Zapolyarny Zapolyarny (Murmansk Oblast)
- Coordinates: 69°25′N 30°48′E
- Country: Russia
- Federal subject: Murmansk Oblast
- Administrative district: Pechengsky District
- Founded: 1956
- Town status since: February 1, 1963
- Elevation: 150 m (490 ft)

Population (2010 Census)
  - Total: 15,825
  - Estimate (2023): 14,231 (−10.1%)
- Time zone: UTC+3 (MSK)
- Postal code: 184430
- OKTMO ID: 47615103001
- Website: pechengamr.gov-murman.ru

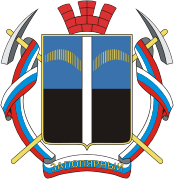
Proposed coat of arms of Zapolyarny

Zapolyarny (Russian: Заполя́рный; Norwegian: Zapoljarnyj) is a town in Pechengsky District of Murmansk Oblast, Russia, located on the Kola Peninsula, 10 kilometers (6.2 mi) northeast of the Kola Superdeep Borehole project. Population: 15,825 (2010 census); 18,640 (2002 census); 23,564 (1989 Soviet census).

The area where the town is located belonged to Finland in 1920–1944. It was founded in 1956 as Zhdanovsk (Жда́новск) and was granted work settlement status and later given its present name.

On February 1, 1963, by the Decree by the Presidium of the Supreme Soviet of the RSFSR, Zapolyarny was elevated in status to that of a town of district significance.

It is the nearest town to the disused Koshka Yavr naval air station.
