= Cheliata =

Settlement in South Ossetia in Georgia

Coordinates: 42°33′33″N 44°12′16″E

Cheliata or Cheliati (Georgian: ჭელიათა) is a settlement in the Dzau district of South Ossetia, Georgia. As of 2015, the settlement had 2 residents.

== See also ==
- Dzau district
