= Raro =

Coordinates: 42°26′51″N 43°52′20″E

Raro (Georgian: რარო; Iron Ossetic: Раро) is a settlement in the Dzau district of South Ossetia, Georgia.

== See also ==
- Dzau district
