= Khodzi =

Khodzi Georgian: ხოძი Iron Ossetic: Ходз
- Village
- Location within South Ossetia Location within Shida Kartli Location within Georgia
- Coordinates: 42°32′07″N 44°14′44″E
- Country: Georgia
- De facto state: South Ossetia (Note: South Ossetia's status is disputed. It considers itself to be an independent state, but this is recognised by only a few other countries. The Georgian government and most of the world's other states consider South Ossetia de jure a part of Georgia's territory.)
- Time zone: UTC+4 (Georgian Time)

Khodzi (Georgian: ხოძი; Iron Ossetic: Ходз) is a settlement in the Java District or Dzau District in Ossetian, in South Ossetian autonomy in Georgia.

== See also ==
- Dzau district
