= Tlia =

Tlia თლია
- Village
- Interactive map of Tlia
- Location within South Ossetia Location within Shida Kartli Location within Georgia
- Coordinates: 42°28′54.9″N 44°07′12.6″E
- Country: Georgia
- De facto state: South Ossetia (Note: South Ossetia's status is disputed. It considers itself to be an independent state, but this is recognised by only a few other countries. The Georgian government and most of the world's other states consider South Ossetia de jure a part of Georgia's territory.)
- Mkhare: Shida Kartli
- Time zone: UTC+4 (Georgian Time)

Tlia (Georgian: თლია) is a village in the Java District of South Ossetia or Shida Kartli, Georgia. The village is located in the Vaneli Community on the right bank of Tlidoni river, at an altitude of 1,800 m. Distance to the municipality center, Java, is 23 km.

== Notable people ==
- Lado Ketskhoveli (1877–1903) - writer and revolutionary
