= Kabuzta =

Kabuzta Georgian: კაბუზთა Iron Ossetic: Къабузтæ
- Village
- Location within South Ossetia Location within Shida Kartli Location within Georgia
- Coordinates: 42°32′33″N 44°14′03″E
- Country: Georgia
- De facto state: South Ossetia
- Time zone: UTC+3

Kabuzta (Georgian: კაბუზთა; Iron Ossetic: Къабузтæ, K'abuzta) is a settlement in the Dzau district of South Ossetia, Georgia.

== See also ==
- Dzau district
