= Edisa =

Settlement in Java, Georgia

Coordinates: 42°32′00.66″N 44°12′17.94″E

Edisa in Georgia

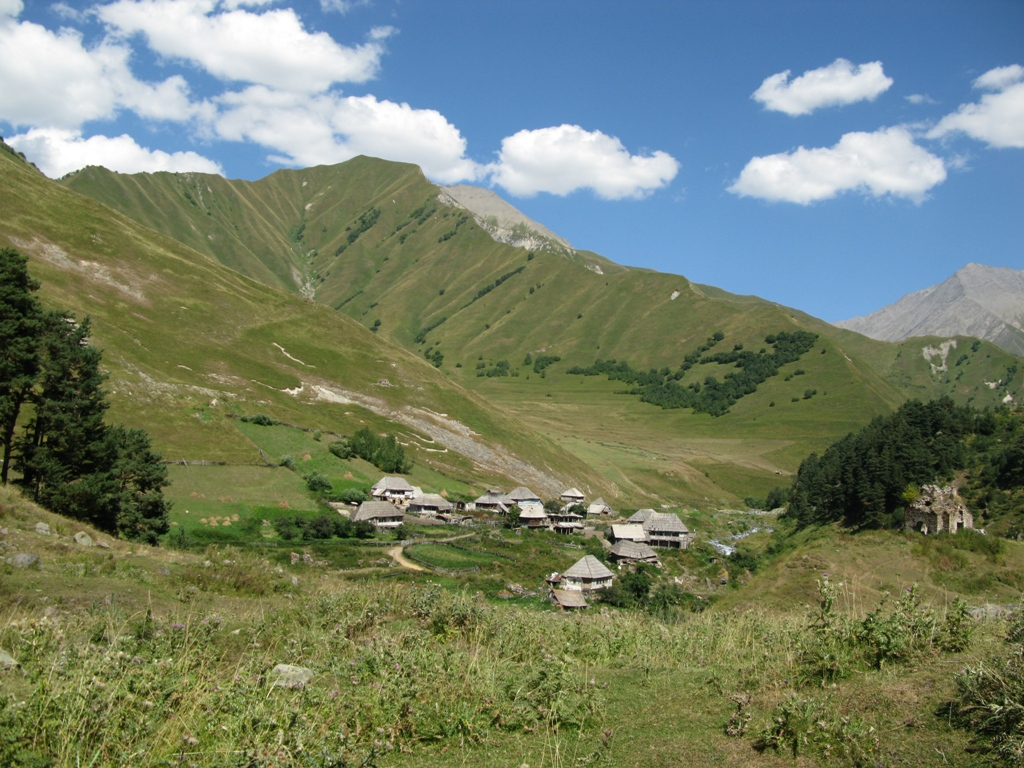

Edisa (Georgian: ედისა, Ossetian: Едыс) is a settlement in the Java district of Georgia.

== See also ==
- Shida Kartli
