= Chitata =

Settlement in South Ossetia, Georgia

Coordinates: 42°29′25″N 43°56′4″E

Chitata (Georgian: ჩიტატა / ჩიტათა, Russian: Хутита) is a settlement in the Java district of South Ossetia, Georgia.

== See also ==
- Dzau district
