= Saritata =

Village in South Ossetia, Georgia

Coordinates: 42°28′10″N 43°48′31″E

Saritata or Saridtata (Georgian: სარიტათა, სარითათა; Ossetian: Сæридтатæ, Сæриттатæ; Russian: Саридтат, Джавистави) is a settlement in the Java district of South Ossetia, Georgia.

== See also ==
- Dzau district
