= Tsona Cave =

Cave in the country of Georgia

- Location within Shida Kartli Location within Georgia
- Location: Georgia
- Coordinates: 42°29′41″N 43°40′46″E
- Length: 100 m (330 ft)
- Discovery: 1958
- Geology: Jurassic sandstone formations

Tsona Cave (Georgian: წონის მღვიმე) is an archaeological site at the head of the river Qvirila in proximity of village Tson (Georgian: წონა, Iron Ossetic: Цъон) in the Java Municipality in Shida Kartli in Georgia. The site is close to the Bouba-Kakheri pass at south of the Caucasus range.

== History ==
Tsona Cave was discovered by A. Kalandadze in 1958. It was excavated by Kalandadze, Tushabramishvili and later by Z. Kikodze.

The cave is located at 2100 m above sea level and therefore it is one of the highest archaeological cave sites in the country. Excavations at the site revealed Lower and Middle Paleolithic archaeological remains.

== See also ==
- Lower Paleolithic in Georgia (country)
