= Britata =

Britata Georgian: ბრითათა
- Interactive map of Britata
- Location in Georgia Britata (Shida Kartli) Britata (Georgia)
- Coordinates: 42°31′13.82″N 44°11′39.77″E
- Country: Georgia
- Mkhare: Shida Kartli
- Municipality: Dzau

Britata or Britat (Georgian: ბრითათა) is a settlement in the Dzau district of South Ossetia, Georgia.

== See also ==
- Dzau district
