= Zemo Koshka =

Zemo Koshka Georgian: ზემო კოშკა
- Village
- Location within South Ossetia Location within Shida Kartli Location within Georgia
- Coordinates: 42°27′33″N 44°02′44″E
- Country: Georgia
- De facto state: South Ossetia (Note: South Ossetia's status is disputed. It considers itself to be an independent state, but this is recognised by only a few other countries. The Georgian government and most of the world's other states consider South Ossetia de jure a part of Georgia's territory.)
- Time zone: UTC+4 (Georgian Time)

Zemo Koshka (Georgian: ზემო კოშკა) is a settlement in the Java district de jure and Dzau District de facto of South Ossetia, a region of Georgia whose sovereignty is disputed.

== See also ==
- Java municipality
- Provisional Administration of South Ossetia
