= Kolas =

Kolas is a name.

== Surname ==
- Yakub Kolas (1882–1956), Belarusian writer

== Given name ==
- Kolas Yotaka (born 1974), Taiwanese politician and journalist

== See also ==
- Kola (disambiguation)
