= Patsa (river) =

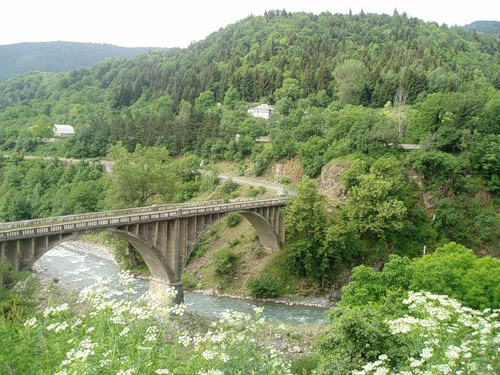
- The bridge across the Patsa at Didi Gupta
- Native name: ფაწა (Georgian); Ирон (Iron Ossetic); Гуфта (Russian)

Physical characteristics
- Source: Racha Range
  - location: Ertso Pass
  - coordinates: 42.4694°N 43.7803°E
- Mouth: Gupta
  - location: Didi Gupta
  - coordinates: 42.3558°N 43.9053°E
- Length: 17 km (11 mi)
- Basin size: 220 km^{2}

Basin features
- River system: Great Liakhvi
- Tributaries
  - left: Saritata
  - right: Keshelta
- Bridges: Didi Gupta Bridge

The Patsa (Georgian: ფაწა) is a river located entirely in the partially recognized Caucasian Republic of South Ossetia, (Note: Most of the United Nations recognizes South Ossetia as part of Georgia, occupied by Russia) forming a river valley, and being one of the Republic's defining geographic features, as well as providing water for irrigation for the Znaur District, the Republic's bread basket.

== Geography ==
The river originates in the Racha Range near the Ertso Pass, on the border of Shida Kartli and Racha-Lechkhumi and Kvemo Svaneti, and runs southwards, concurrently with the Kudar Valley. (Note: Also known as the Patsa river valley) The Valley is known for its large number of caves and rock structures. Settlements along the river include Kemulta, where the Keshelta merges into the Patsa, Kotano, Sokhta and Nazigini, where the Saritata River merges into the Patsa. The river then continues to Bakhuta, Siukata, Ugardanta, Shikhanturi and Fatsa before it merges into the Liakhvi River at Didi Gupta.

== History ==
In 1892 a German engineer surveyed the Patsa river valley as a route for an imperial railroad, although the route was ultimately never constructed.

In 1991 an earthquake caused a landslide in the Patsa River Valley which resulted in the Patsa being dammed for 10 years. The degrading barrier lake eventually naturally transitioned into an alluvial barrier basin by 2001 allowing the free flow of the river again.

The bridge across the Patsa at Didi Gupta is one of the most important pieces of infrastructure in South Ossetia, as it is the only connection from Java to Tskhinvali. As such, during both the 1991 and 2008 wars, the Georgian army targeted the bridge, since it was the only route for the Russian army to reach Tskhinvali and the rest of Georgia from South Ossetia.
