= Shua Ermani =

Settlement in Dzau, South Ossetia

Coordinates: 42°30′45″N 44°14′47″E

Shua Ermani (Georgian: შუა ერმანი; Ossetian: Астæуккаг Ерман, Astæukkag Еrman) is a settlement in the Dzau district of South Ossetia, Georgia.

== See also ==
- Dzau district
