= Kotanto =

Coordinates: 42°26′03″N 43°50′23″E

Kotanto (Georgian: ქოთანთო; Ossetian: Котанто or Биазыртыхъæу) is a settlement in the Dzau district of South Ossetia, Georgia.

== See also ==
- Dzau district
