= Kvemo Koshka =

Settlement in South Ossetia

Coordinates: 42°27′57″N 44°03′25″E

Kvemo Koshka or Kvemo Kuschita (Georgian: ქვემო კოშკა (ქვემო კოშკი); Ossetian: Дæллаг Къусчытæ; Russian: Нижняя Кусчита) is a settlement in the Java district of South Ossetia, Georgia.

== See also ==
- Dzau district
