= Vaneli =

Vaneli Georgian: ვანელი Iron Ossetic: Уанел
- Village
- Location within South Ossetia Location within Shida Kartli Location within Georgia
- Coordinates: 42°27′49.5″N 44°03′40.1″E
- Country: Georgia
- De facto state: South Ossetia (Note: South Ossetia's status is disputed. It considers itself to be an independent state, but this is recognised by only a few other countries. The Georgian government and most of the world's other states consider South Ossetia de jure a part of Georgia's territory.)
- Mkhare: Shida Kartli
- Municipality: Java Municipality
- Time zone: UTC+4 (Georgian Time)

Vaneli (Georgian: ვანელი; Iron Ossetic: Уанел) is a village in the Java District of South Ossetia or Shida Kartli, Georgia. The village is the center of the eponymous community consisting of 12 villages. It is located on the right bank of Greater Liakhvi river, at an altitude of 1,310 m. Distance to the municipality center Java is 18 km.
