= Sokhta =

Coordinates: 42°25′52″N 43°49′17″E

Sokhta (Georgian: სოხთა; Ossetian: Сохтæ, Soxtæ) is a settlement in the Dzau district of South Ossetia, a region of Georgia whose sovereignty is disputed. The village is located along the Patsa river.

== See also ==
- Dzau district
