= Kudaro =

Archaeological site in Georgia

Kudaro is an archeological site located in the highlands of Georgia. It consists of caves, in which Lower Paleolithic Acheulean artifacts were found 1600m above sea level. Handaxes dating back 40000-25000 years were found in the caves of the site.

== See also ==
- Lower Paleolithic in Georgia (country)
