= Kola (name) =

Kola is a name common in multiple countries. Notable people with this name include:

== Given name ==
- Kola Adesina (born 1964), Nigerian businessman
- Kola Aluko (born 1969), Nigerian businessman
- Kola Bhaskar (died 2020), Indian film editor
- Kola Bokinni (born 1992), English actor
- Kola Boof, Sudanese-American writer
- Kola Ogunkoya (born 1967), Nigerian musician
- Kola Ogunmola (1925–1973), Nigerian dramatist and playwright
- Kola Onadipe (1922–1988), Nigerian writer
- Kola Oyewo (born 1946), Nigerian film actor
- Kola Tubosun (born 1981), Nigerian educator and writer

== Nickname ==
- Kola Beldy (1929–1993), Russian folk-pop singer
- Kola Kwariani (1903–1980), Georgian professional wrestler
- Kola (singer) (born 1993), Ukrainian singer

== Surname ==
- Agustin Kola (born 1959), Albanian footballer
- Bledar Kola (born 1972), Albanian footballer
- Edison Kola (born 2001), Greek footballer
- Ravi Kiran Kola (born 1994), Indian film director
- Rodgers Kola (born 1989), Zambian footballer
- Vani Kola (born 1963/64), Indian venture capitalist
- Vashtie Kola (born 1981), American music video director
