= Nazigina =

Settlement

Coordinates: 42°25′23″N 43°49′21″E

Nazigina (Georgian: ნაზიგინა; Ossetian: Нæзыджын, Næzydžyn) is a settlement in the Dzau district of South Ossetia, Georgia. According to the 2015 Census, the village was home to 5 people.

== See also ==
- Dzau district
