= Pikris Gora =

Pikris Gora ფიქრის გორა
- neighborhood
- Flag

- Location within Tbilisi
- Coordinates: 41.7098525°N 44.7827728°E
- Country: Georgia
- City: Tbilisi
- Raioni: Vera district
- Time zone: UTC+4 (Georgian Time)

Pikris Gora (Georgian: ფიქრის გორა) is small, triangular shaped neighborhood in the Vera District of central portion of the Georgian city of Tbilisi.

The neighborhood is bordered on the north by Merab Kostava Street, on the south by Petre Melikishvili Street, and on the west by Varaziskhevi Street. Pikris Gora literally translates to "hill of thoughts".
