= Kula, Iran =

Kula كولا
- Village
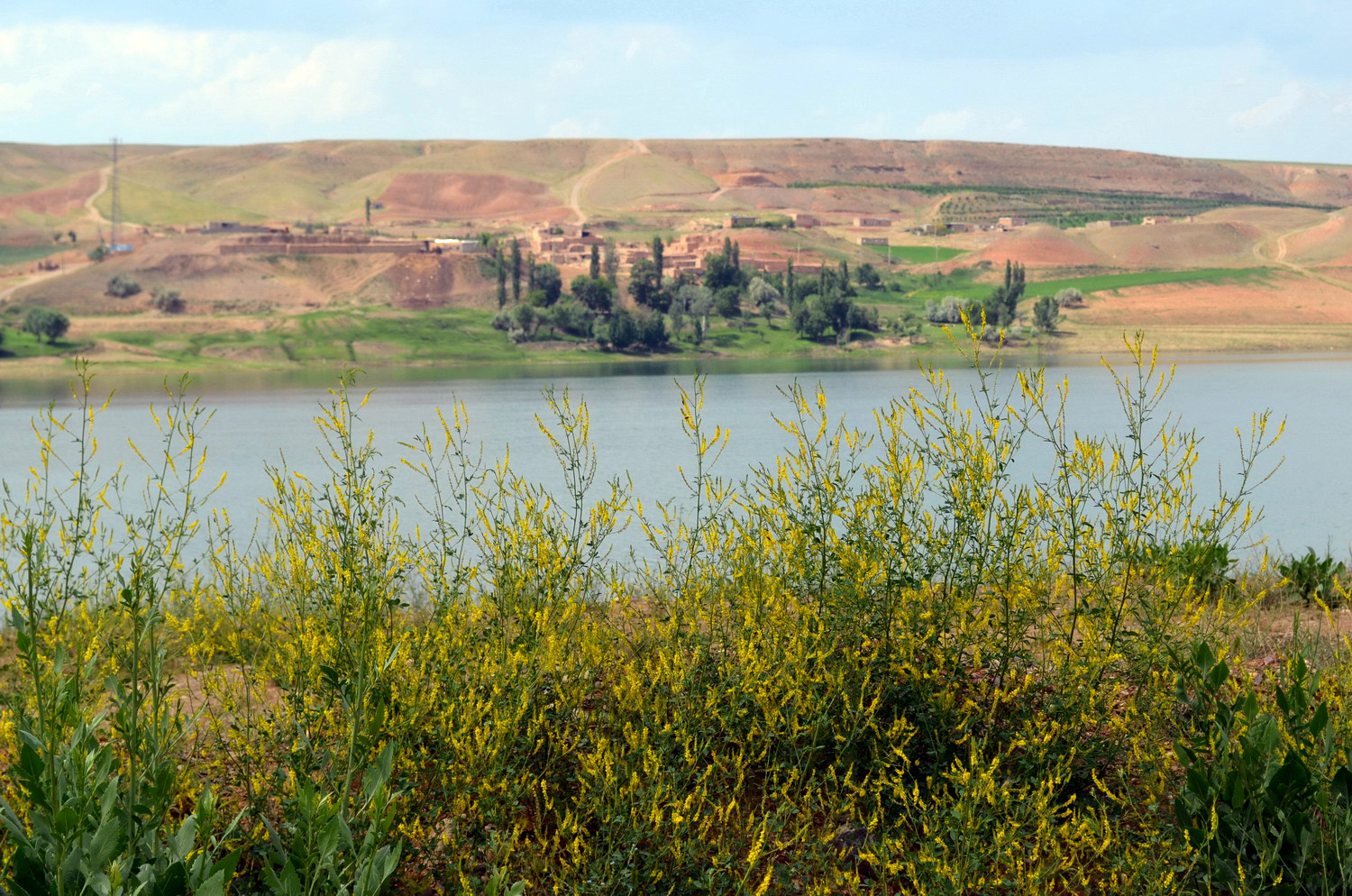
- Kula, Iran

- Location within Iran
- Coordinates: 37°15′16″N 47°32′15″E
- Country: Iran
- Province: East Azerbaijan
- County: Meyaneh
- Bakhsh: Central
- Rural District: Kolah Boz-e Sharqi

Population (2006)
  - Total: 274
- Time zone: UTC+3:30 (IRST)
  - Summer (DST): UTC+4:30 (IRDT)

Kula (Persian: كولا, also Romanized as Kūlā; also known as Kolā) is a village in Kolah Boz-e Sharqi Rural District, in the Central District of Meyaneh County, East Azerbaijan Province, Iran. At the 2006 census, its population was 274, in 46 families.
