= Kola (South Ossetia) =

Coordinates: 42°28′21″N 43°54′28″E

Kola (Georgian: ყოლა; Ossetian: Хъола, Qola) is a settlement in the Dzau district of South Ossetia, Georgia.

== See also ==
- Dzau district
