= Master Raro =

Master Raro was a notable character that appeared in many of Robert Schumann's character pieces for solo piano. Raro may represent the union of (Clara + Robert). He was the personality that balanced the two contrasting natures of Eusebius (passive, dreamy) and Florestan (aggressive, enthusiastic). Master Raro was also the primary arbiter of the many pseudonyms under which Robert Schumann took guise in his critical writings within Neue Zeitschrift für Musik, the journal through which he evaluated the music world. Raro appears to bring logic and reason into a complex mixture of views of the Davidsbündler. He reflects Schumann's writing mastery and musical genius.
