= Koshka Yavr (air base) =

- IATA: none; ICAO: none

Summary
- Airport type: Military
- Operator: Russian Air Force
- Location: Zapolyarnyj
- Elevation AMSL: 495 ft / 151 m
- Coordinates: 69°15′6″N 031°11′48″E
- Interactive map of Koshka Yavr

Runways
Direction	Length		Surface
Direction	ft	m	Surface
01/19	9,842	3,000	Concrete

Koshka Yavr is a Soviet Naval Aviation and Russian Naval Aviation reserve airfield in Murmansk Oblast, Russia located 25 km southeast of Zapolyarny and 83 km west of Murmansk. It was one of nine primary Arctic staging bases for the Tupolev Tu-22M (Backfire) bomber that was in service in the 1980s.
