= Cola (name) =

Cola is both a surname and a given name. Notable people with the name include:

== Given name ==
- Cola Barr Craig (1861–1930), American author and clubwoman
- Cola di Rienzo (c. 1313 – 1354), Italian politician
- Cola Nicea (1886–?), Aromanian soldier
- Cola Petruccioli (1360–1401), Italian painter
- Ke Le (born 1997), Singaporean-Malaysian singer-actress, going by her stage name of "Cola"

== Surname ==
- Andrea Cola (born 1999), Italian racing driver
- Baratunde A. Cola (born 1981), American nanotechnologist
- Gennaro di Cola (c. 1320 – c. 1370), Italian painter
- Mattia Cola (born 1984), Italian biathlete
- Philippe Cola (born 1956), a French sports shooter
- Sherry Cola (born 1989), Chinese-born American comedian and actress
