= Kvaisa =

Kvaisi კვაისი
- Townlet
- Interactive map of Kvaisi
- Location within Georgia Location within Racha-Lechkhumi and Kvemo Svaneti Location within South Ossetia
- Coordinates: 42°31′22.04″N 43°38′22.04″E
- Country: Georgia
- Mkhare: Racha-Lechkhumi and Kvemo Svaneti
- District: Oni
- Elevation: 1,350 m (4,430 ft)

Population (1989)
  - Total: 2,264

Kvaisi or Kvaisa (Georgian: კვაისი [kʼʷaisi], Iron Ossetic: Къуайса [ˈkʼʷäjsä]) is an urban-type settlement in the Oni Municipality of Georgia. According to the official subdivision of Georgia it is in the Oni district of the Racha-Lechkhumi and Kvemo Svaneti region of Georgia.

Settlement is located on the river Jejora (which is a tributary of Rioni river) on the slopes if Racha mountain ridge, 60 km north-west of Tskhinvali and 20 km from Oni.

Lead and zinc deposits are located near the city and in the Soviet times an ore mining and processing enterprise and hydroelectric power station worked in the region.

The town suffered significantly in the 7–8 September 2009 earthquake and around 80 local families remained homeless in late September.
