= Jejora =

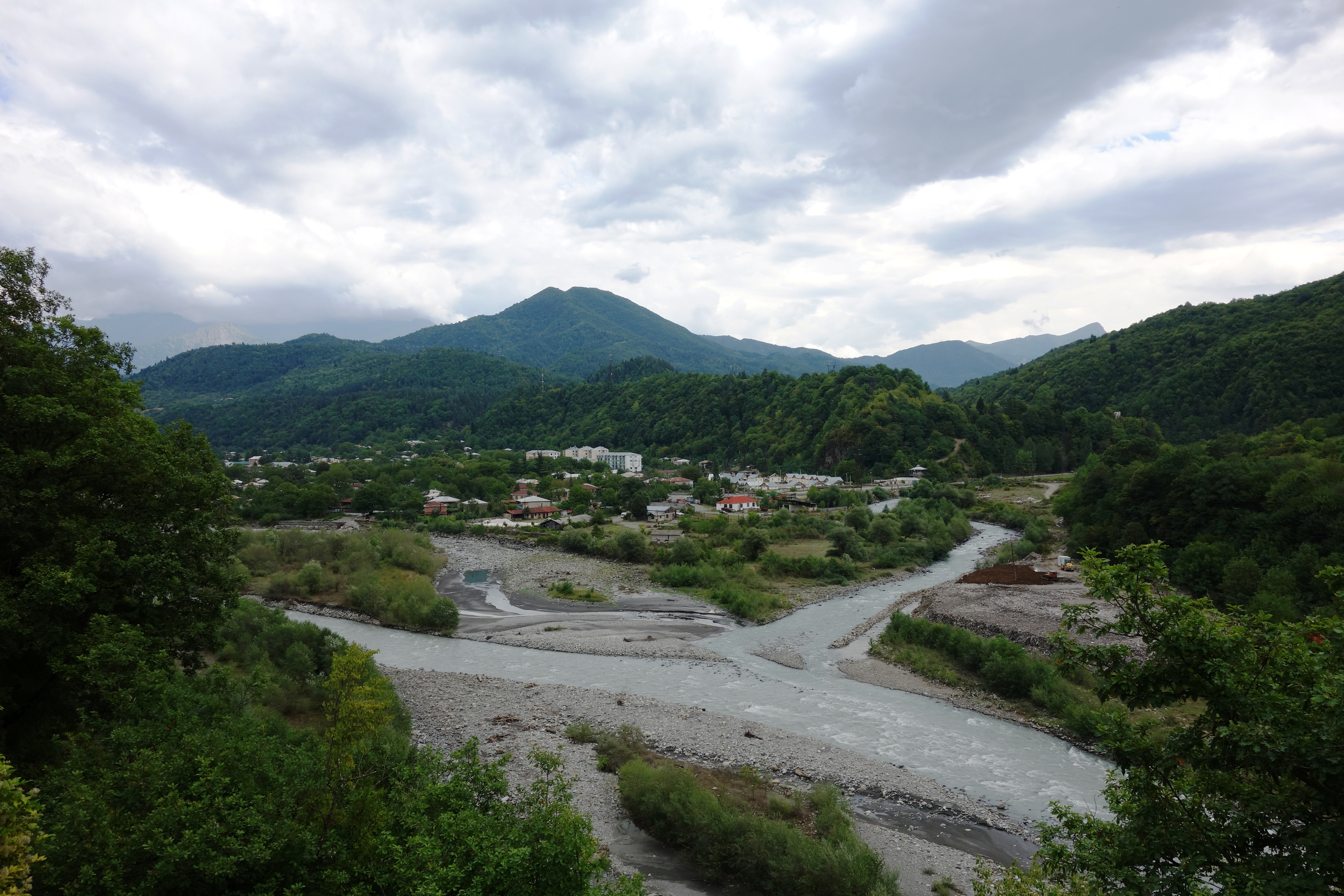
- Jejora (right) at the confluence with the Rioni. Oni town is in the background.

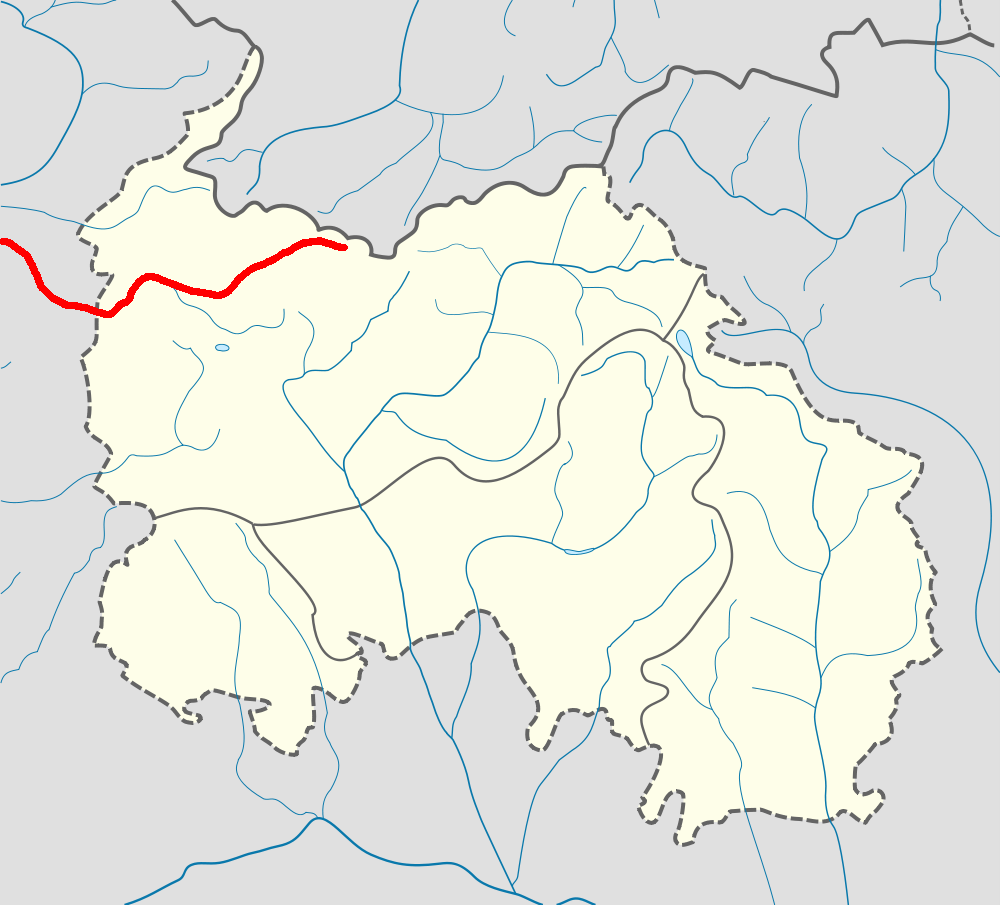
- Jejora with Jochiara on the map of South Ossetia
- Native name: ჯეჯორა (Georgian); Джоджора (Iron Ossetic)

Location
- Country: Georgia

Physical characteristics
- Mouth: Rioni
  - location: Oni, Georgia
  - coordinates: 42°34′30″N 43°25′31″E
- Length: 45 km (28 mi)
- Basin size: 438 km^{2} (169 sq mi)

Basin features
- Progression: Rioni→ Black Sea

The Jejora (Georgian: ჯეჯორა), (Iron Ossetic: Стырдон) is a river in Racha region of Georgia. It is 45 km (28 mi) long, and has a drainage basin of 438 km^{2} (169 sq mi). It is a left tributary of the Rioni, the longest river wholly flowing within the borders of Georgia. It originates in South Ossetia in the Dvaleti section of the main watershed of the Greater Caucasus, 2975 m above sea level and flows in a western direction. South of the river valley rises the mountains of the Racha Range. It joins the Rioni at Oni town.
