= Mekhadiri =

Mekhadiri Georgian: მეხადირი
- Village
- Location in Georgia Mekhadiri (Abkhazia)
- Coordinates: 43°26′56″N 40°06′18″E
- Country: Georgia
- Partially recognized independent country: Abkhazia
- District: Gagra

Government
  - Mayor (de facto): Grigori Khorozyan (Note: "Администрация городов, сёл и посёлков Гагрского района". Gagra District Administration.)
  - Deputy Mayor (de facto): Leonid Agumava
- Time zone: UTC+3 (MSK)

Mekhadiri (Georgian: მეხადირი) is a village in the Gagra District of Georgia. (Note: The political status of Abkhazia is disputed. Having unilaterally declared independence from Georgia in 1992, Abkhazia is formally recognised as an independent state by 4 UN member states (three other states previously recognised it but then withdrew their recognition), while the remainder of the international community recognizes it as de jure Georgian territory. Georgia continues to claim the area as its own territory, designating it as Russian-occupied territory.) It is a predominately Armenian settlement.

== See also ==
- Gagra District
