= Georgian Soviet Encyclopedia =

Encyclopedia first published in 1965

- Book cover, vol. “Georgian SSR”
- Language: Georgian and Russian
- Subject: General
- Genre: Reference encyclopaedia
- OCLC: 9959451

The Georgian Soviet Encyclopedia (Georgian: ქართული საბჭოთა ენციკლოპედია, romanized: kartuli sabch'ota entsik'lop'edia, ქსე) is the first universal encyclopedia in the Georgian language, printed in Tbilisi from 1975 to 1987, the editor in chief of which was Irakli Abashidze. The encyclopedia consists of 11 alphabetic volumes and a 12th exclusively dedicated to the Georgian SSR, printed in both Georgian and Russian.

== History ==
The concept of publishing a Georgian-language encyclopedia significantly predated the foundation of the Georgian Soviet Encyclopedia publishing house, having been brought up in the magazine Tartarozi back in 1927. However, initial attempts to create a Georgian language encyclopedia were not fulfilled. This was attributed to the massacre of academics under Georgian Joseph Stalin's Great Purge. Only in 1965 was an editorial board and staff of 146 put together for the development of the Georgian Soviet Encyclopedia. The staff eventually grew to 238 with delays in publishing being attributed to "proteges" writing segments being slower. The first volume (ა — ატოცი) was published in 1975.

The Georgian Soviet Encyclopedia was viewed as reaffirming Georgian culture. Even after the fall of the Georgian Soviet Socialist Republic and dissolution of the Soviet Union, the current Georgian Encyclopedia views the Georgian Soviet Encyclopedia as its immediate lineal predecessor. It was noted by academics to be useful for its biographical sketches of well-known Georgians.

== Volumes ==
The following volumes were printed.

Volume	Title	Year of issue
1	ა — ატოცი	1975
2	ატოცობა — გარიგა	1977
3	გარიგება — ეგე	1978
4	ეგევსი — თუთა	1979
5	თუთია — კოქტეილი	1980
6	კოქტო — მინკუსი	1983
7	მინორი — პეგუ	1984
8	პედაგოგი — სამეული	1984
9	სამეურვეო — ტიხტიხი	1985
10	ტიხუანა — შინდარა	1986
11	შინდი — ჰუხი	1987
N/A	საქართველოს სსრ	1981

== See also ==
- Great Soviet Encyclopedia
