= Mskhlebi (Java Municipality) =

Mskhlebi მსხლები
- Village
- Location in Georgia
- Coordinates: 42°23′27″N 43°54′53″E
- Country: Georgia
- Mkhare: Shida Kartli
- Municipality: Java
- Community: Mskhlebi
- Elevation: 1,140 m (3,740 ft)

Mskhlebi (Georgian: მსხლები, literally "pears") is a highland village and community center in northern Georgia. It is located on the right bank of the river Greater Liakhvi in the Java Municipality, Shida Kartli region. Distance to the municipal center, Java, is 2 km. The village is bordered by Oak forests. The area has seen many invasions from the Russians.
