= Community (administrative division) =

Level of government serving a single locality

A community is an administrative division found in Belgium, Canada, Georgia, Greece, Iceland, Trinidad and Tobago, Ukraine, Wales, and the League of Nations Class A mandates.

== Notable examples ==
- Community (Armenia)
- Community (China)
- Community (Greece)
- Community (Wales)

== See also ==
- Autonomous community
- Residential community
- Community council
