= Java Municipality =

Java Municipality ჯავის მუნიციპალიტეტი
- Municipality
- Location of Java Municipality in Georgia
- Country: Georgia
- Region: Shida Kartli
- Capital: Java
- Towns and villages: 106

Area
  - Total: 1,448 km^{2} (559 sq mi)

Population
  - Total: 10,000
  - Density: 6.9/km^{2} (18/sq mi)
- Time zone: UTC+3

Java Municipality (Georgian: ჯავის მუნიციპალიტეტი, Javis municip’alit’et’i) is a municipality of Georgia, in the region of Shida Kartli.

== International status ==
The entire municipality is located in the partly recognized Republic of South Ossetia (Dzau District of South Ossetia) and has not been under control of Georgian government since 1992.

== Transport ==
Roki Tunnel, a strategic pass linking South Ossetia with Russia, is located in the municipality.

== See also ==
- List of municipalities in Georgia (country)
