= Dzau District =

Dzau District ჯავის მუნიციპალიტეტი Дзауы район
- District in South Ossetia
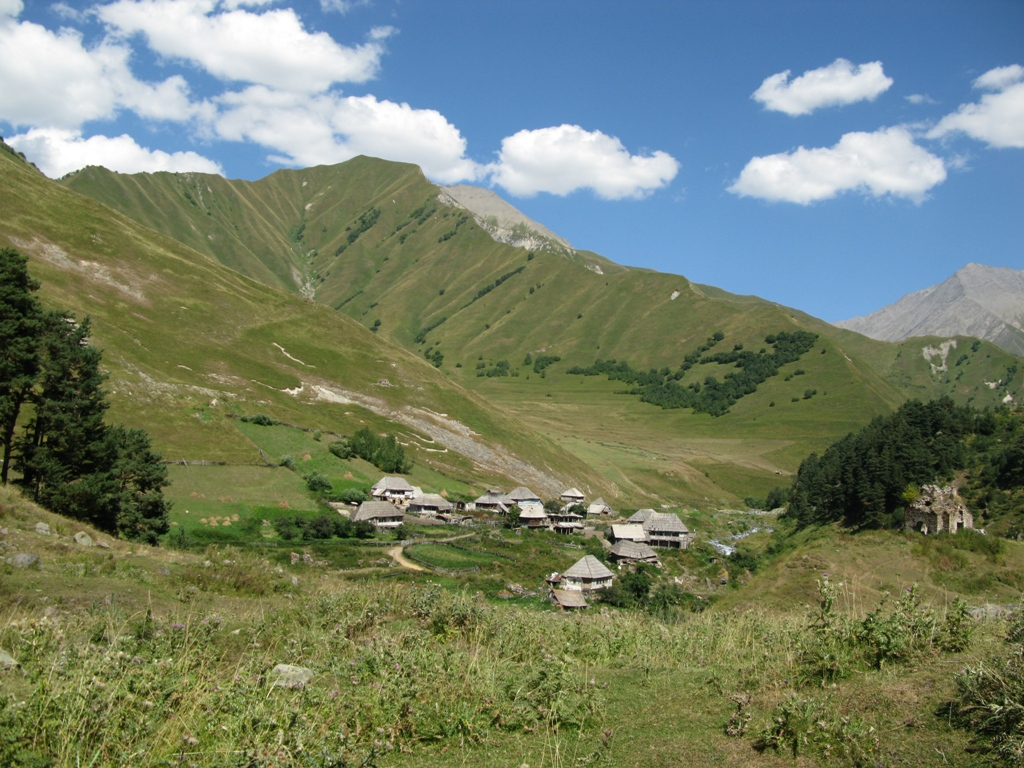
- Edisa

- Location of Dzau District in South Ossetia
- Coordinates: 42°27′23.96″N 43°52′56.11″E
- Country: Georgia
- De facto state: South Ossetia (Note: South Ossetia's status is disputed. It considers itself to be an independent state, but this is recognised by only a few other countries. The Georgian government and most of the world's other states consider South Ossetia de jure a part of Georgia's territory.)
- Capital: Java

Government
  - Head of administration: Vladimir Kelekhsaev
  - Votes in Parliament: (of 69)

Area
  - Total: 1,448 km^{2} (559 sq mi)

Population (2015)
  - Total: 6,567
  - Density: 4.535/km^{2} (11.75/sq mi)
- Time zone: UTC+03:00 (MSK)

Dzau District (Georgian: ჯავის მუნიციპალიტეტი, Javis municip’alit’et’i; Iron Ossetic: Дзауы район, Dzawy rajon; Russian: Дзауский район, Dzauskij rajon) is a district in South Ossetia. It is internationally recognized as part of Georgia.

== Geography ==
Roki Tunnel, Mamison Pass, Transcaucasian Highway, Ossetian Military Road and the lake Ertso are located in the district.

The largest town is Java; the second largest town is Kvaisa located in the western part of the district.

== Demographics ==
As of 2015, the Dzau District had a population of 6,567.

== International status ==
According to administrative division of Georgia, Dzau District is situated in the whole territory of Java Municipality, and part of Oni Municipality and Sachkhere Municipality of Georgia.
