= Kharistvala =

Kharistvala ხარისთვალა
- Town
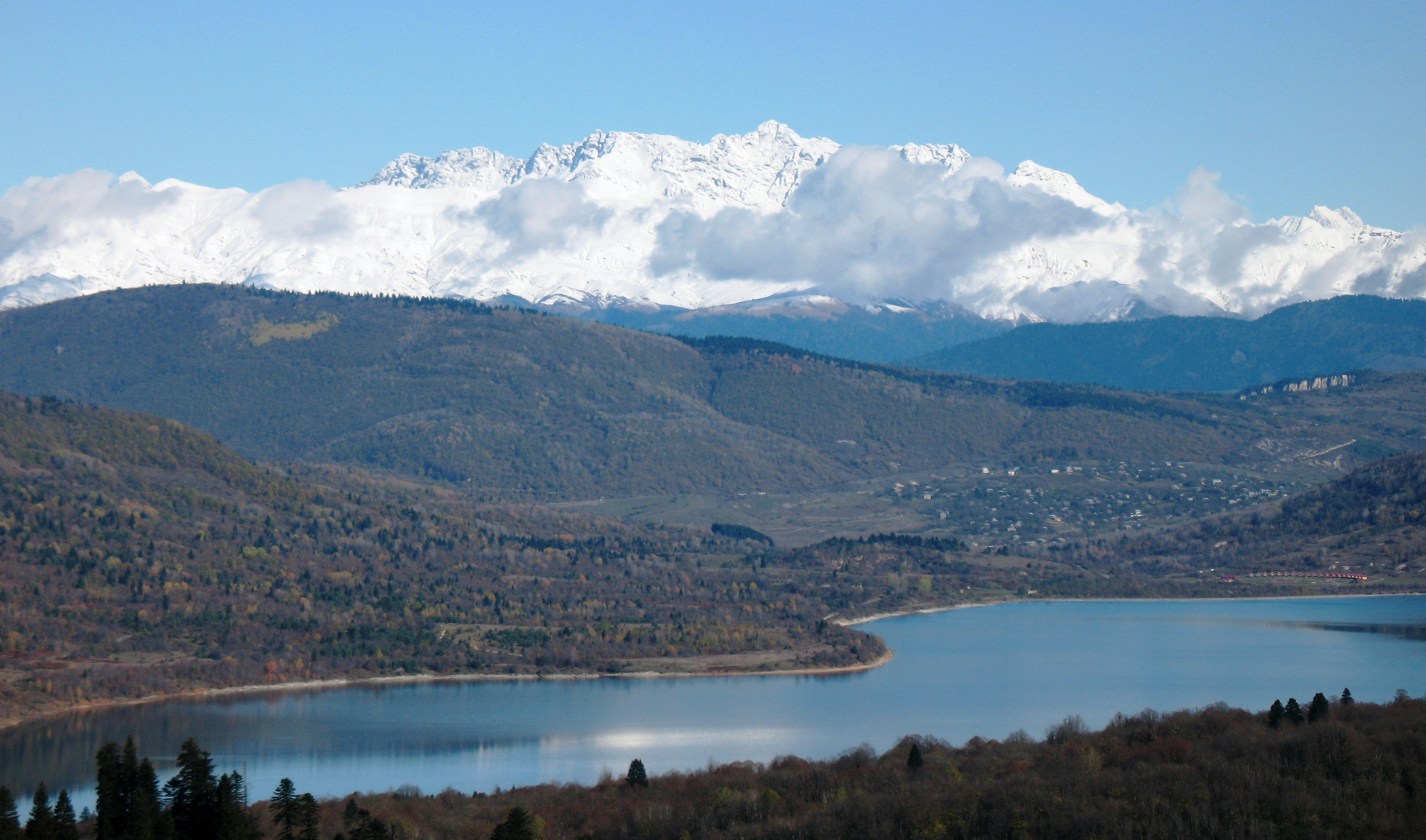
- Kharistvali left on the shore of Shaori Reservoir

- Location within Georgia Location within Racha-Lechkhumi and Kvemo Svaneti
- Coordinates: 42°24′44″N 43°2′41″E
- Country: Georgia
- Mkhare: Racha-Lechkhumi and Kvemo Svaneti
- Municipality: Ambrolauri
- Elevation: 1,150 m (3,770 ft)

Population (2021)
  - Total: 0
- Time zone: UTC+4 (Georgian Time)

Kharistvala (Georgian: ხარისთვალა) is a so called daba (urban-type settlement) in Georgia’s northern Ambrolauri Municipality (Racha-Lechkhumi and Kvemo Svaneti region), at an elevation of 1,150 metres (3,770 ft) above sea level on the western shore of Shaori Reservoir. It is located about 20 kilometres (12 mi) south of the municipal center Ambrolauri, and 5 kilometres (3.1 mi) north of the 1,217 metres (3,993 ft) high Nakerala Pass. Remarkably, the settlement has no permanent population (2021), while still registered as a daba. Kharistvala is administratively part of the Nikortsminda community (თემი, temi) which also consists of villages Kachaeti and Nikortsminda, known for the Nikortsminda Cathedral. It acquired the daba status in 1956.

== Geology ==
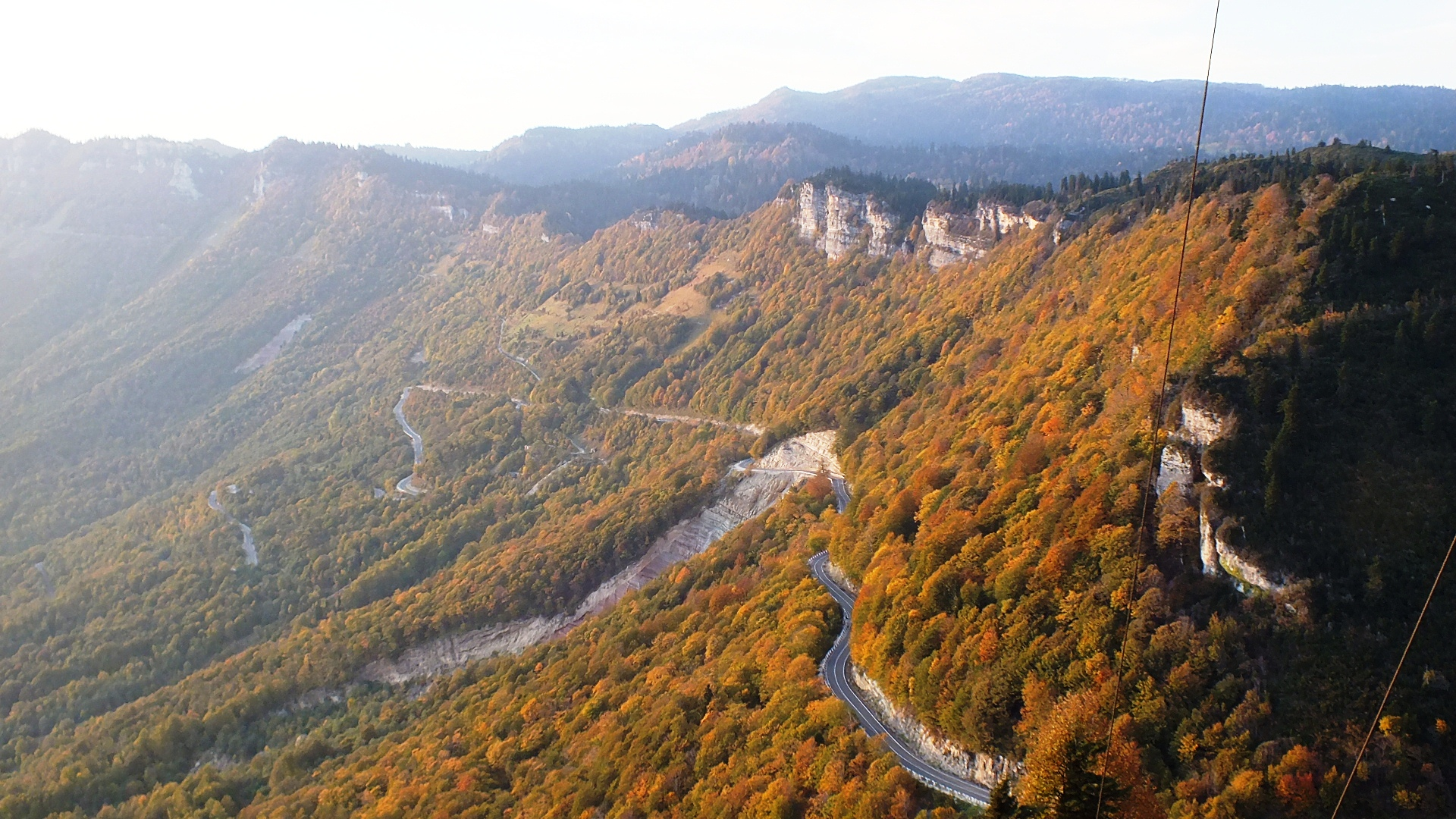
Nakerala limestone cliffs and pass

The settlement is located in a karst plateau that is part of the Racha Range. It contains the Shaori Reservoir at an altitude of about 1,150 metres (3,770 ft), which is the largest lake in Racha. The reservoir was created by the placement of an earthen dam in the northwestern corner of the local depression in the plateau and is mainly fed by groundwater. The depression originally contained a few smaller lakes: Kharistvala and Dzrokhistvala. The Shaori reservoir has an area of over 9 km² with a maximum depth of 14 meters and is the upper part of the Shaori-Tkibuli hydroelectric power chain.

South from the reservoir is the Nakerala Range, a limestone range that is part of the Racha Range with sharp cliffs. The southern face of the Nakerala Range has a cliff height of 300 to 600 metres (980 to 1,970 ft). At Kharistvala, the national route Sh17 (Ambrolauri - Tkibuli - Kutaisi) passes through the 1,217 metres (3,993 ft) high Nakerala Pass.

== History ==
The settlement hosted workers and geologists in the 1950s that were involved in the construction of the Shaori-Tkibuli hydroelectric power chain. The Tkibuli reservoir is located 13 kilometers to the southwest and 600 metres (2,000 ft) lower in the Imereti region. The hydroelectric power station opened in 1955. During this period, the Soviet government recognized the health nature of the Shaori area and designated it as a resort destination and giving Kharistvala the status of daba. With the project finished, and in lack of deploying resort activities, the settlement has depopulated. Big development plans have frequently been announced after the 2003 Rose Revolution, but as of 2022 nothing came of that except for the construction of one hotel.

== Demographics ==
Kharistvala has no permanent population according to the 2021 statistics.

Year	1939	1959	1970	1979	1989	2002	2014	2021
Number	-	827	▼134	▼65	▼26	▼4	▼0	0
Data: population statistics cities and towns
