= Ambrolauri Municipality =

Coordinates: 42.5217°N 43.1483°E

Ambrolauri Municipality ამბროლაურის მუნიციპალიტეტი
- Shaori lake

- Flag Seal

- Interactive map of Ambrolauri Municipality
- Country: Georgia
- Mkhare: Racha-Lechkhumi and Kvemo Svaneti
- Administrative centre: Ambrolauri

Government
  - Type: Mayor–Council
  - Body: Ambrolauri Municipal Assembly
  - Mayor: Zviadi Mkheidze (Georgian Dream)

Area
  - Total: 1,142 km^{2} (441 sq mi)

Population (2021)
  - Total: 10,405
  - Density: 9.111/km^{2} (23.60/sq mi)

Population by ethnicity
  - Georgians: 99.7 %
  - Russians: 0.1 %
- Time zone: UTC+4 (Georgian Time)
- Website: ambrolauri.gov.ge

The Ambrolauri Municipality (Georgian: ამბროლაურის მუნიციპალიტეტი, romanized: ambrolauris munitsip'alit'et'i) is a self-governing subdivision in western Georgia. Its governing bodies are based in the city of Ambrolauri. Together with the neighboring municipalities Lentekhi, Oni, and Tsageri, the Ambrolauri Municipality forms the region of Racha-Lechkhumi and Kvemo Svaneti. The municipality has an area of is 1142 km^{2}, and population of 10,405 (2021).

== Geography ==
Ambrolauri is situated in the southern slope of the Greater Caucasus and borders various subranges of the Caucasus. Its southern geographical boundary is the Racha Range while its northern limit is the Lechkhumi Range, where its highest mountain peaks are located. The municipality is crossed by the Rioni and its tributaries: Krikhula, Znakura, Shareula, Lukhuni, Ritseula and Askistskali. Due to its mountainous character the agricultural land only occupies 240 km^{2} (21%) of the sparsely populated municipal territory. The municipality also contains rich deposits of arsenic and gypsum.

== History ==
The municipality was established as a raion in 1930. Before that, its territory was part of Racha Uyezd in Kutaisi Governorate and, between 1928 and 1930, of the short-lived Racha-Lechkhumi Uyezd, when it became an independent district (raion). From 1951 to 1953, it was part of Kutaisi Okrug. With the creation of administrative regions in 1995, Ambrolauri became part of Racha-Lechkhumi and Kvemo Svaneti. In 2006, the raion was transformed into a municipality.

Between 2014 and 2017, the city of Ambrolauri, like six others, was separated from the municipality and was a so-called "self-governed" city (or kalaki). In 2017 this decision was reverted and the city Ambrolauri, like six other cities, lost its self-governing status again when the central government deemed this reform too expensive and inefficient.

== Administrative divisions ==
The Ambrolauri Municipality is administratively divided into 18 communities (თემი, temi) with 69 villages (სოფელი, sopeli). There is one urban-type settlement (დაბა, daba) and one city (ქალაქი, kalaki).

- city: Ambrolauri;
- daba: Kharistvala;
- villages: 69, such as Abanoeti, Abari, Baji, Tkhmori, Uravi, Znakva.

== Population ==
The population of Ambrolauri Municipality was 10,405 at the start of 2021, which is a 7% decrease from the last census of 2014. (Note: Combined figures of the municipality of Ambrolauri Municipality and the city of Ambrolauri, which have been listed separatedly in the census of 2014.)

According to the 2014 census, the ethnic composition is mono-ethnic Georgian (Rachvelian sub-group), apart from a few dozen residents of mixed origin. The population consists of followers of the Georgian Orthodox Church.

Population Ambrolauri Municipality
	1897	1922	1926	1939	1959	1970	1979	1989	2002	2014	2021
Ambrolauri Municipality	-	-	-	38,191	▼26,667	▼24,128	▼20,916	▼17,065	▼16,079	▼11,186	▼10,405
Ambrolauri	-	-	-	1,104	▲3,043	▼2,317	▲2,639	▲2,933	▼2,541	▼2,047	▼2,015
Kharistvala (daba)	-	-	-	-	827	▼134	▼65	▼26	▼4	▼0	0
Data: Population statistics Georgia 1897 to present. Note: (Note: The 2014 census found an inexplicable gap with the data from the national statistical office Geostat. UN-assisted research has found the 2002 census was inflated by about 8-9 percent. See, "1. Introduction", Page 1.)

Ethnic Composition of Ambrolauri Municipality (2014 Census)
Ethnicity	Population	Percentage
Georgian	9,113	99.72%
Russian	11	0.12%
Ossetian	3	0.03%
Armenian	2	0.02%
Ukrainian	5	0.05%
Greek	2	0.02%
Other	3	0.03%

== Politics ==
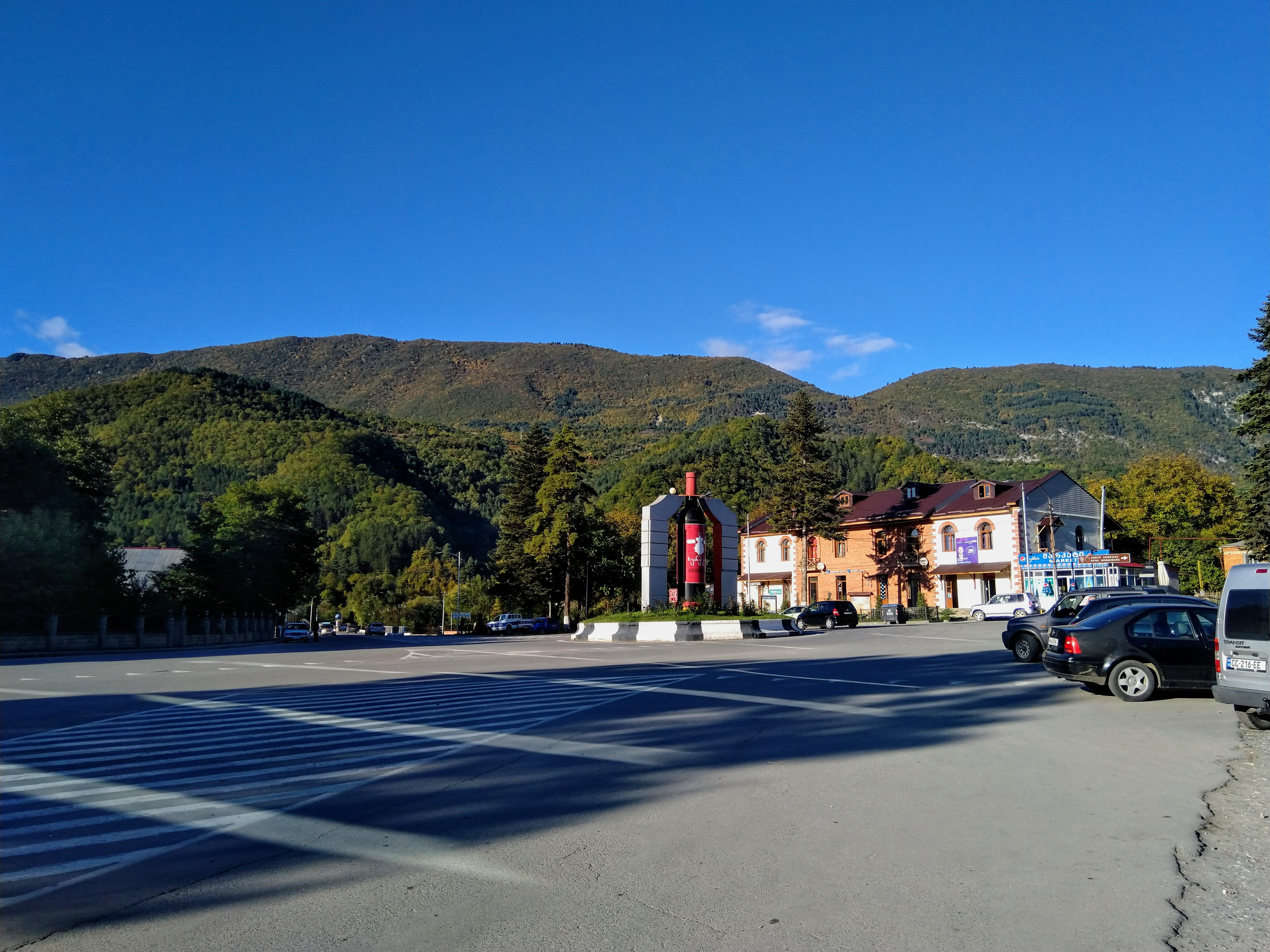
Khvanchkara is an Ambrolauri wine

Ambrolauri Municipal Assembly (Georgian: ამბროლაურის საკრებულო, Ambrolauri Sakrebulo) is a representative body in Ambrolauri Municipality, consisting of 30 members which are elected every four years. The last election was held in October 2021. Zviadi Mkheidze of Georgian Dream was elected mayor for a second term.

Party	2017	2021	Current Municipal Assembly
Georgian Dream	28	22	
United National Movement	2	4	
For Georgia		3	
Lelo		1	
Alliance of Patriots	1		
European Georgia	1		
Labour Party	1		
Free Georgia	1		
Total	34	30	

== Economy ==
Agriculture, especially viticulture-viniculture and animal husbandry, is the main activity of the population. The culture of fruit is developing in the mountainous zones. The main industries are wine factories and cheese factories. The Khvanchkara wine is a key product from Ambrolauri, given the name of the village near Ambrolauri city. It is the only area in Georgia where this wine is allowed to be made.

== Transport ==
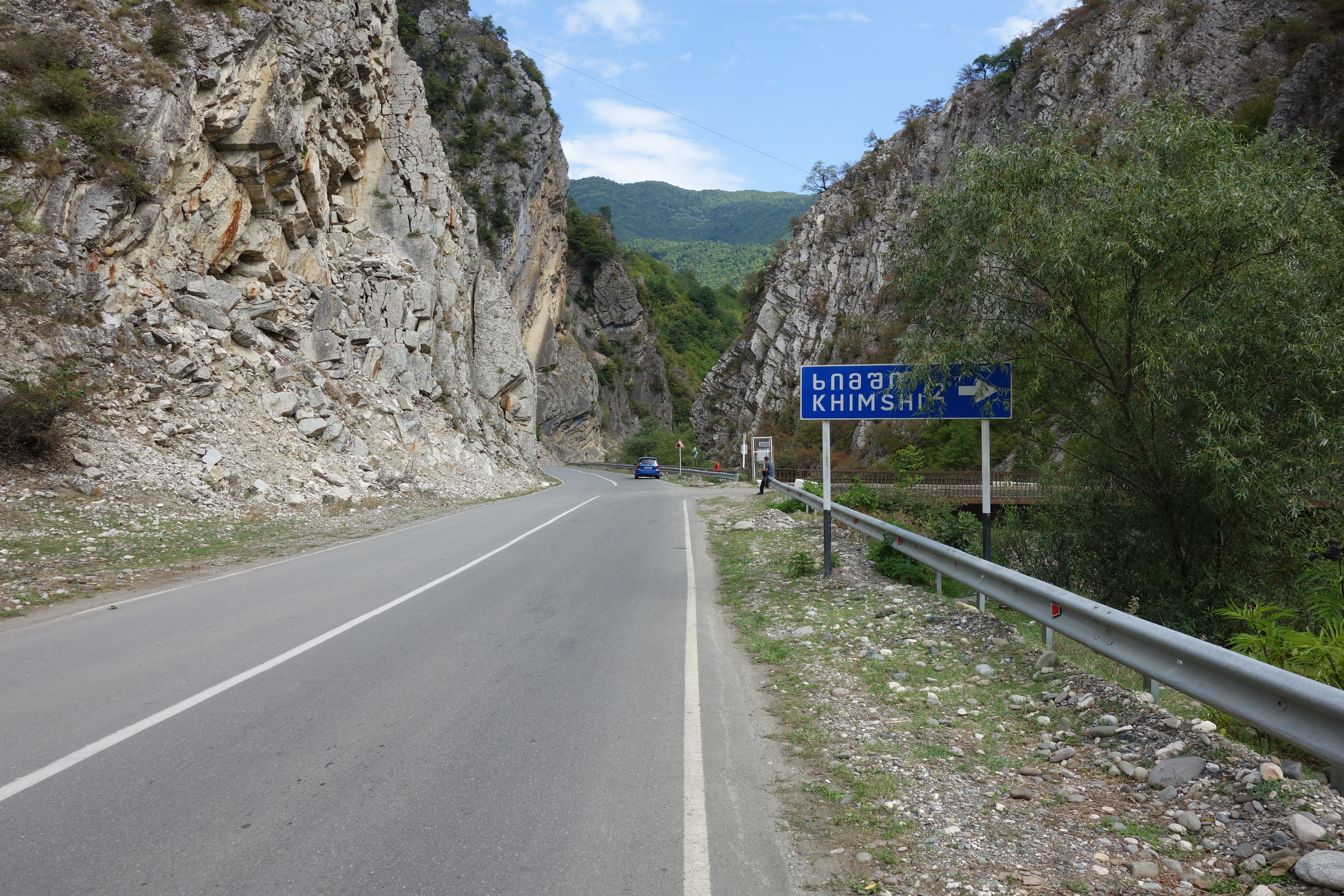
Ossetian Military Road at Khidiskari

The municipality of Ambrolauri is well connected to the rest of Racha-Lechkhumi and Kvemo Svaneti as well as to the rest of Georgia. Through the municipality passes the national route Sh16 (Kutaisi - Ambrolauri Oni - Mamison Pass) which follows the Rioni River upstream from Kutaisi and ends via Ambrolauri and Oni at the Mamison Pass on the Russian border. It is also known as the Ossetian Military Road, which was originally constructed in the 19th century as an alternative route from Russia to Georgia, in addition to the existing Georgian Military Road. Today the road ends at the de facto border with South Ossetia, shortly before the Mamison Pass and the Russian border.

The national route Sh17 connects the municipality with central Georgia via Tkibuli and the Ambrolauri Airport offers flights to Natakhtari Airfield, servicing the Tbilisi area. Since 1887, the nearest train station is in Tkibuli, the terminus of the railway line from Kutaisi.

== Monuments ==
- Historical monuments include Nikortsminda Cathedral, Barakoni, Minda Tsikhe, and Khotevis Tsikhe.
- There is also the Shaori Reservoir.

== Gallery ==
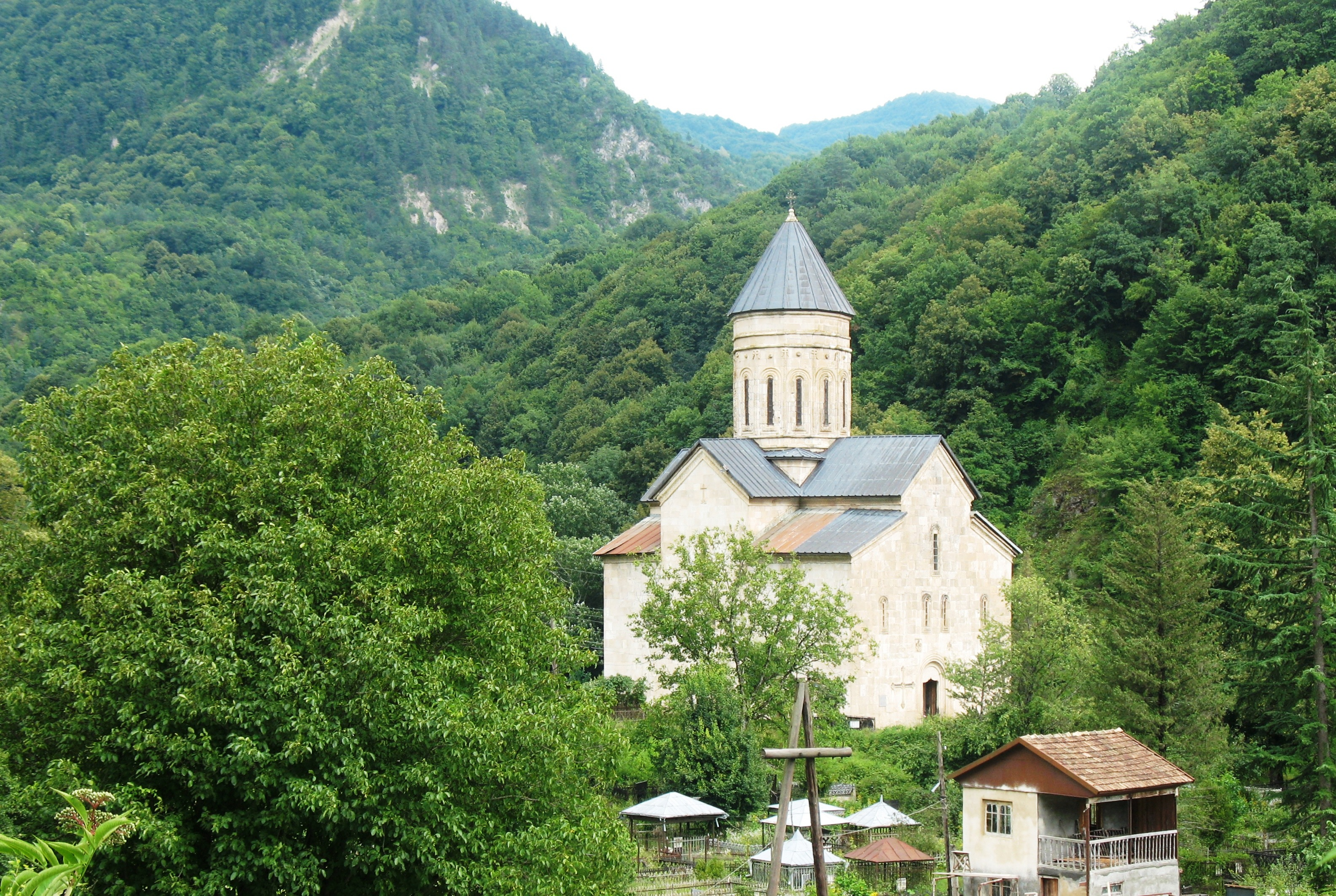
Barakoni Church

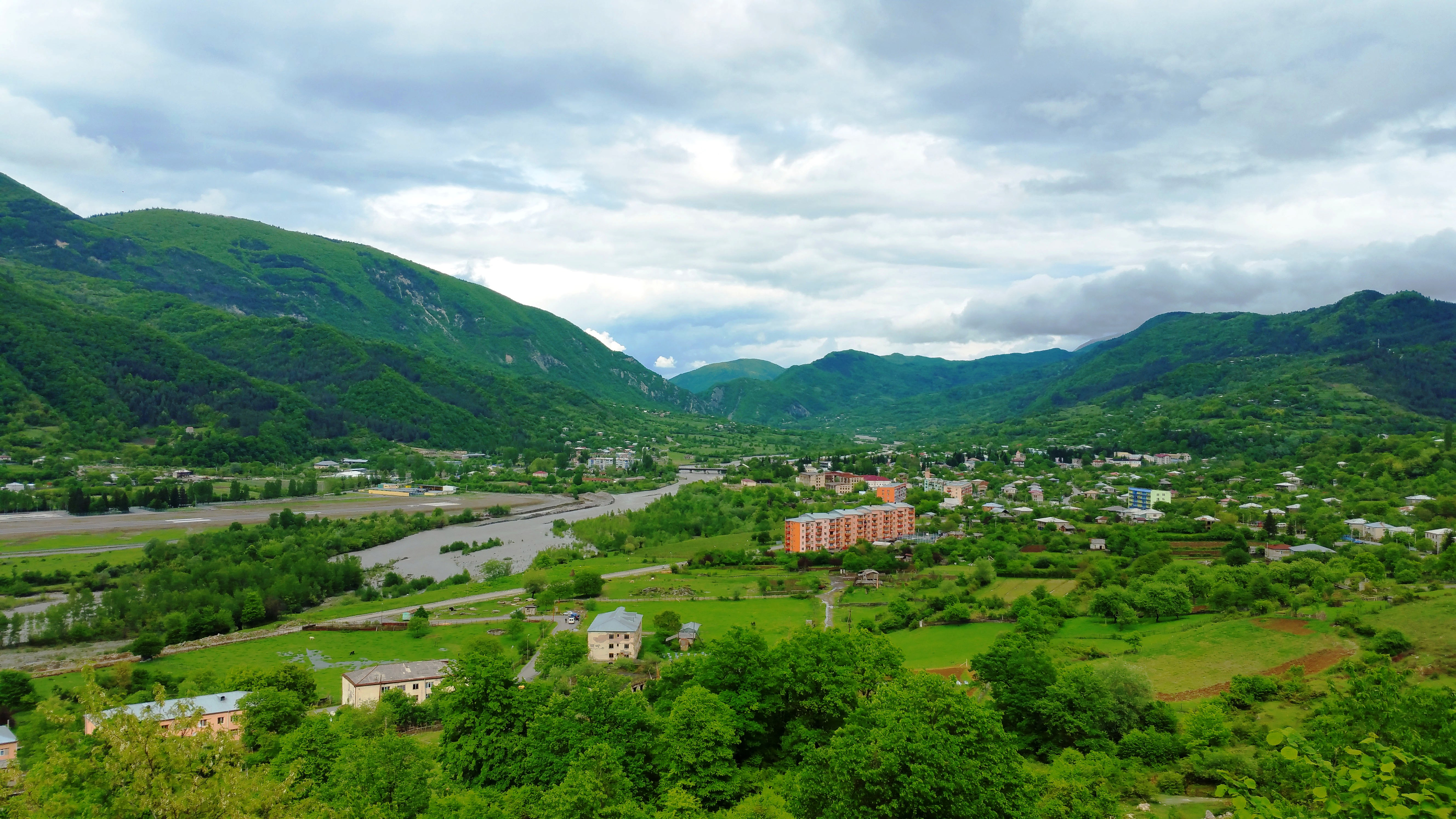
View of Ambrolauri

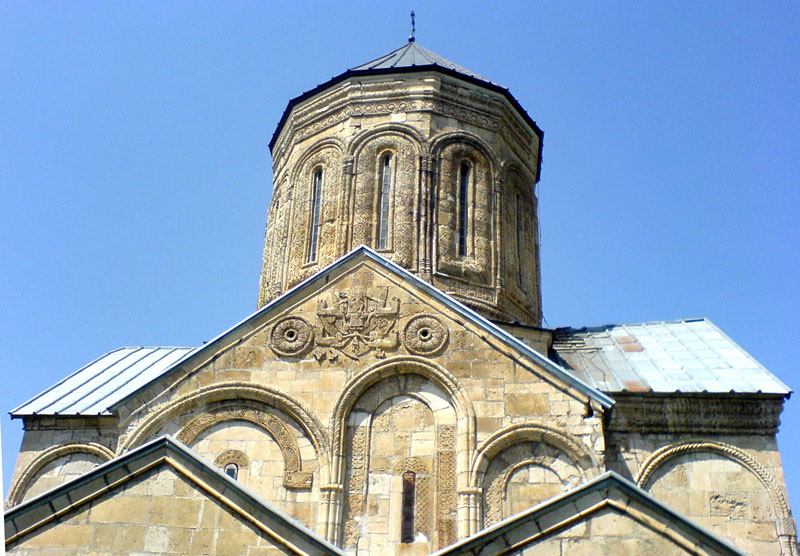
Nikortsminda Cathedral

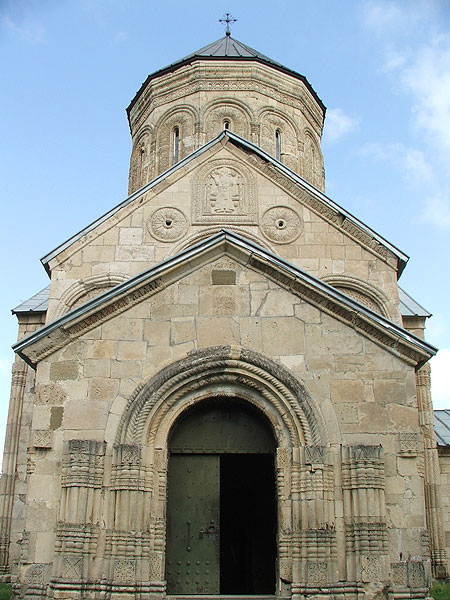

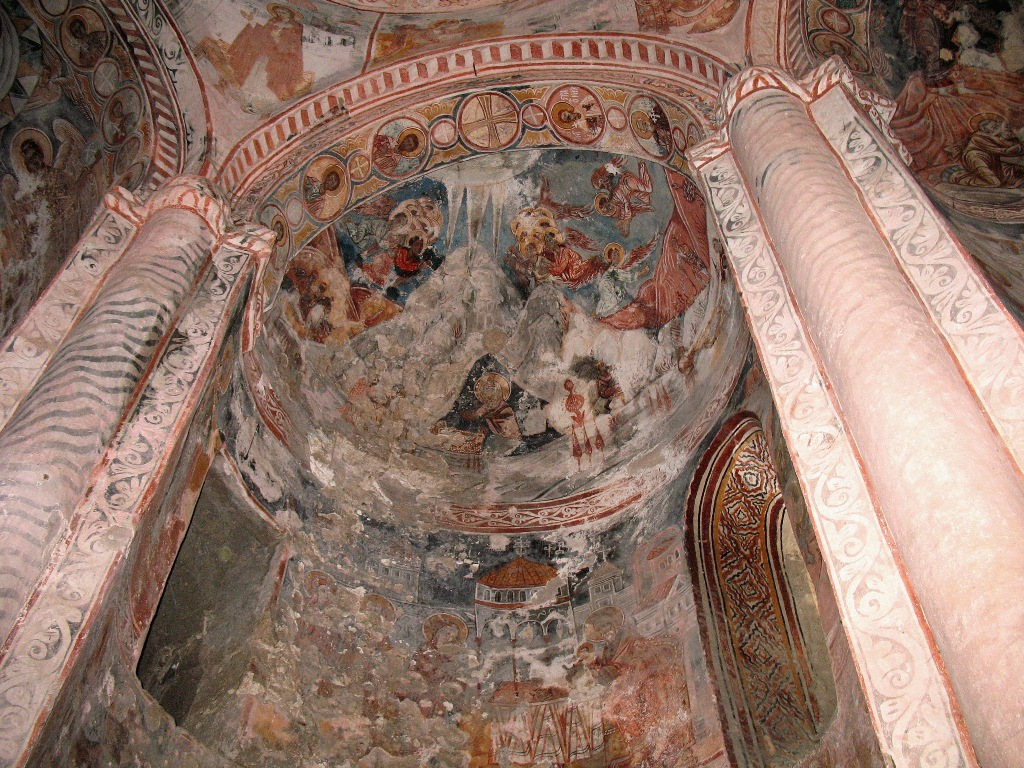
Frescoes of Nikortsminda Cathedral

== See also ==
- List of municipalities in Georgia (country)
