= Abari =

Abari აბარი
- Interactive map of Abari
- Location in Georgia Abari (Racha-Lechkhumi and Kvemo Svaneti)
- Coordinates: 42°36′55″N 43°15′50″E
- Country: Georgia
- Region: Racha-Lechkhumi and Kvemo Svaneti
- Municipality: Ambrolauri
- Elevation: 880 m (2,890 ft)

Population (2014)
  - Total: 122
- Time zone: UTC+4 (Georgian Time)

Abari (Georgian: აბარი) is a village in Racha-Lechkhumi and Kvemo Svaneti region, Georgia. It is part of the Likheti commune, Ambrolauri municipality, with the population of 122, mostly (99.2%) ethnic Georgians, as of the 2014 census.

Abari is located on the right bank of the Lukhuni river, a right tributary of the Rioni, on the southern foothills of the Lechkhumi Range, 17 km. northeast of the town of Ambrolauri.

The population of Abari is dominated by two surnames: Lobzhanidze and Japaridze. According to local tradition, the village was founded by a man surnamed Lobzhanidze from the Ghebi in the northernmost part of Racha in the 18th century. The Japaridze descend from a priest sent to Abari in the 19th century. Since the Soviet period, the families in Abari have used rural-urban migration to access the different resources provided by the village and the city.

== Sources ==
- Dragadze, Tamara (1988). Rural Families in Soviet Georgia: A Case Study in Ratcha. London: Routledge. ISBN 978-0-415-00619-4.
