= List of villages in Tkibuli =

The Tkibuli Municipality is in the Imereti region, in Georgia. it contains 46 villages, and according to the 2014 year, all villages in total have 11069 population. It contains 479 Square Kilometers. Most villages are in the middle of Tkibuli, and Tkibuli itself is on the east.

Villages in North

Village	Population
Gurna	419
Sochkheti	346
Tsqnori	306
Dzmuisi	143
Kisoreti	55
Villages of North Tkibuli

Villages in Middle

Village	Population
Khresili	274
Dzuqnuri	158
Bueti	122
Leghva	118
Kveda Chqepi	109
Tsikhia	92
Kitkhiji	72
Boboti	69
Gadmoghma Tsqatsitela	54
Jonia	46
Lapeti	35
Antoria	27
Nadzva	20
Ivaneuli	18
Akhaldaba	16
Gadaghma Tsqaltsitela	11
Koreeti	7
The map of Tkibuli villages in the middle.

Villages in South

Village	Population
Tsutskhvati	671
Koka	196
Okhomira	21
South Tkibuli Villages

Villages in East

Village	Population
Mukhura	1412
Satsire	626
Dabadzveli	333
Akhalsopeli	299
Dzirovani	275
Samtredia	212
Zedaubani	134
Bziauri	68
Mukhura in East Tkibuli, East. More Tkibuli villages on the east

Villages in South-West

Village	Population
Kursebi	1603
Orpiri	936
Naboslevi	412
Gelati	408
Motsameta	187
Villages of South-West Tkibuli

Villages in West-North

Village	Population
Jvarisa	249
Ojola	140
Mandikori	119
Zeda Chqepi	91
Khorchana	62
Shuqeri	45
Lashia	32
Leqereti	21
Villages in West-North Tkibuli Leqereti in Tkibuli, West-North Tkibuli.

Populations (2014):
