= George Coby =

Georgian-American businessman, inventor and chemist

- George Coby (top right) with group of people
- Born: Grigol Kobakhidze; 1883; Tkhmori, Racha, Georgia
- Died: October 30, 1967; Providence, US
- Occupation(s): Businessman, inventor, chemist
- Spouse: Dasha Coby

George Coby (born Grigol Kobakhidze; Georgian: გრიგოლ კობახიძე; 1883 – October 30, 1967) was a Georgian-American businessman, inventor, and chemist. He is believed to be the first Georgian millionaire. Two of his most notable inventions include waterproof concrete and glass bricks; he was also linked to the first electrical Christmas tree lights' invention.

== Early life ==
George Coby was born to a family of peasants in Tkhmori, Georgia, which was, at the time, a part of Imperial Russia. He received his primary education at home before studying with a priest at a local parish. At the age of 10, he left his home village and went to Borjomi, where his older brother worked as a machinist. In Borjomi, he began to work at a glass factory where he mastered every technique used in the factory and developed a method to boost productivity. Coby then moved to Tbilisi to work in a different glass factory. During the 1905–1907 Russian revolution, he was arrested and threatened with deportation. During this period, he met his future wife, Dasha Nodvikova, who was of Swedish origin, and his future business partner, Eugene (Evgeni) Ignatiev. In 1907, he moved to Munich, Germany, then in 1908 to London, U.K., and finally, in 1909, he moved to New York City, US

== Career ==
When Coby arrived in the U.S., he got a job baking bread with his fellow countrymen from Racha. He and his wife then became employed by General Electric, where they worked for nine years. During his time there, Coby filed several patents for writing pens. By 1919 he had earned enough capital to establish his factory in Attleboro, Massachusetts. By 1922, his company, Coby Glass Products, had firmly established itself among the top industrial players of the Eastern United States. The company produced medical, chemical, and construction products, including 45 other goods and raw materials.

Parallel to his business activities, Coby maintained an active political and social life. He was a very vocal supporter of independence for the Democratic Republic of Georgia, which existed between 1918 and 1921. He visited his homeland twice after the Soviet occupation of Georgia, between 1924 and 1928, and supported emigrants coming to the U.S. from Georgia.

George Coby partnered with Prince Matchabelli to manufacture special bottles for their perfume in the shape of the Georgian Queen's insignia.

During the Great Depression, Coby Glass Products Company lost millions, leading to the suicide of George's business partner, Ignatiev. George Coby filed for bankruptcy but managed to open a small shop where he sold small glass items and office supplies.

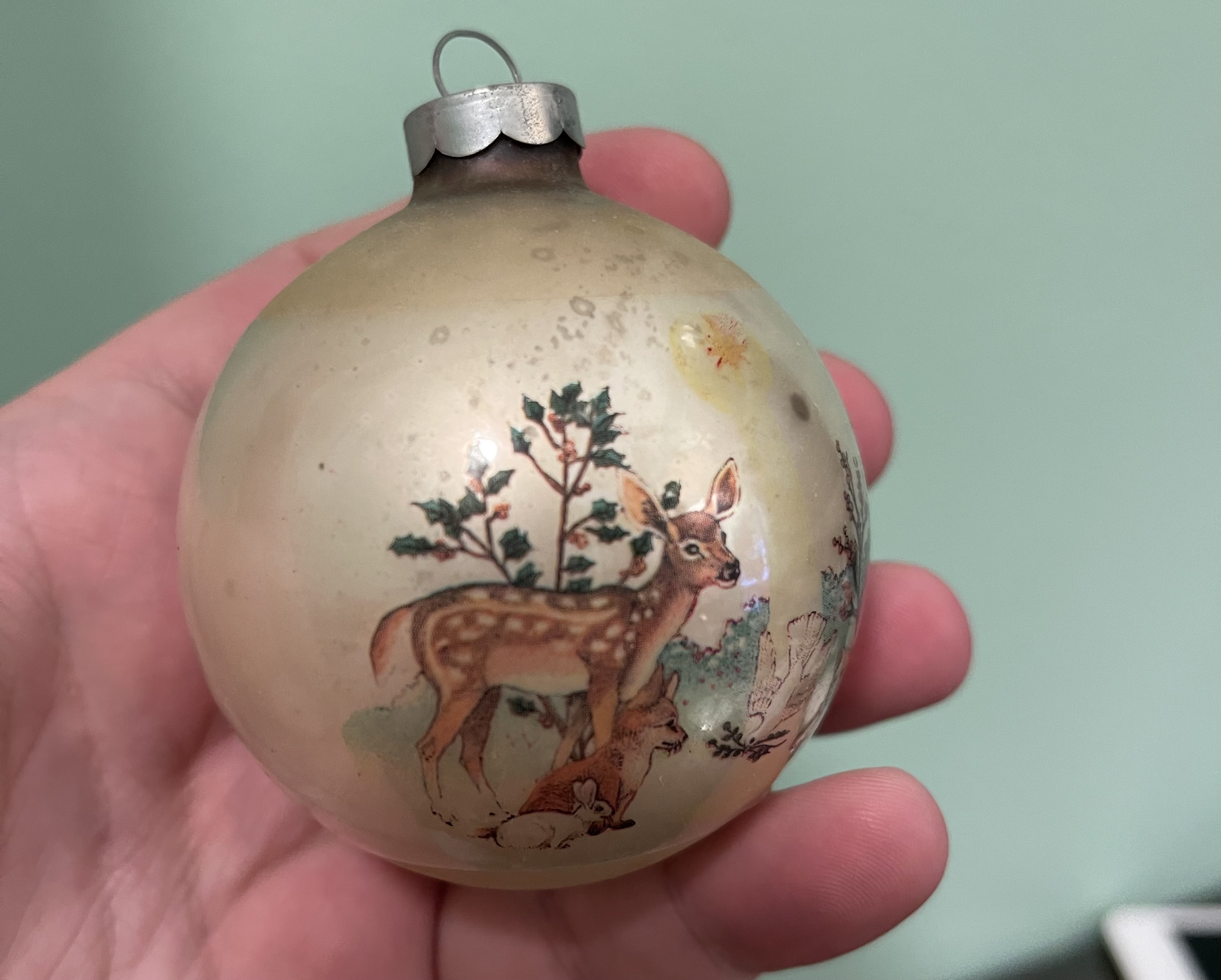
Very rare of Coby's Glass from a private collection of Manuchar Pirveli

During World War II, on December 7, 1941, George Coby appealed to the U.S. Government for financial support to restore his glass factory to aid military production and was subsequently granted two million dollars. George opened a new factory in Pawtucket, Rhode Island and supplied chemical and medical laboratories and hospitals with glass products.

After World War II ended, Coby expanded production, made Christmas decoration items and his Christmas items conveyed Georgian motives, such as grape leaves and grapes.

Coby died on October 30, 1967, at the age of 83 or 84.
