= Abanoeti =

Abanoeti აბანოეთი
- Village
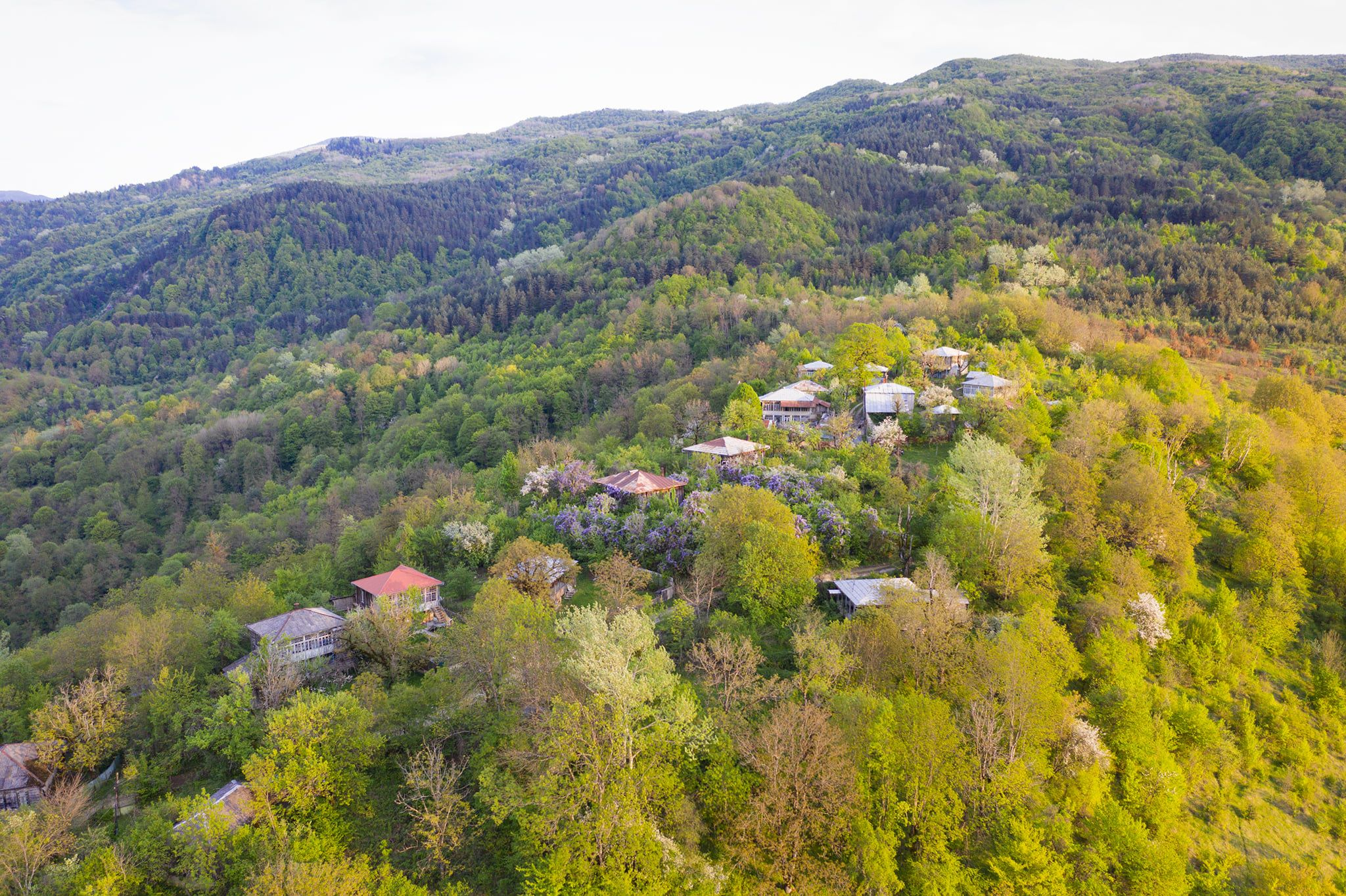

- Location within Georgia Location within Racha-Lechkhumi and Kvemo Svaneti
- Coordinates: 42°32′24″N 43°01′17″E
- Country: Georgia
- Mkhare: Racha-Lechkhumi and Kvemo Svaneti
- Municipality: Ambrolauri
- Elevation: 820 m (2,690 ft)

Population (2014)
  - Total: 102
- Time zone: UTC+4 (Georgian Time)

Abanoeti (Georgian: აბანოეთი), formerly also known as Mikartsminda (მიქარწმინდა), is a village in Georgia’s northern Ambrolauri Municipality (Racha-Lechkhumi and Kvemo Svaneti region) with a population 102 (2014). It is located about 11 kilometres (6.8 mi) west of the municipal center Ambrolauri, at an elevation of 820 metres (2,690 ft) above sea level on a hill overlooking the Rioni River. It is part of the Bugeuli administrative community (თემი, temi) that includes 5 more nearby villages.

== Mikartsminda Monastery ==
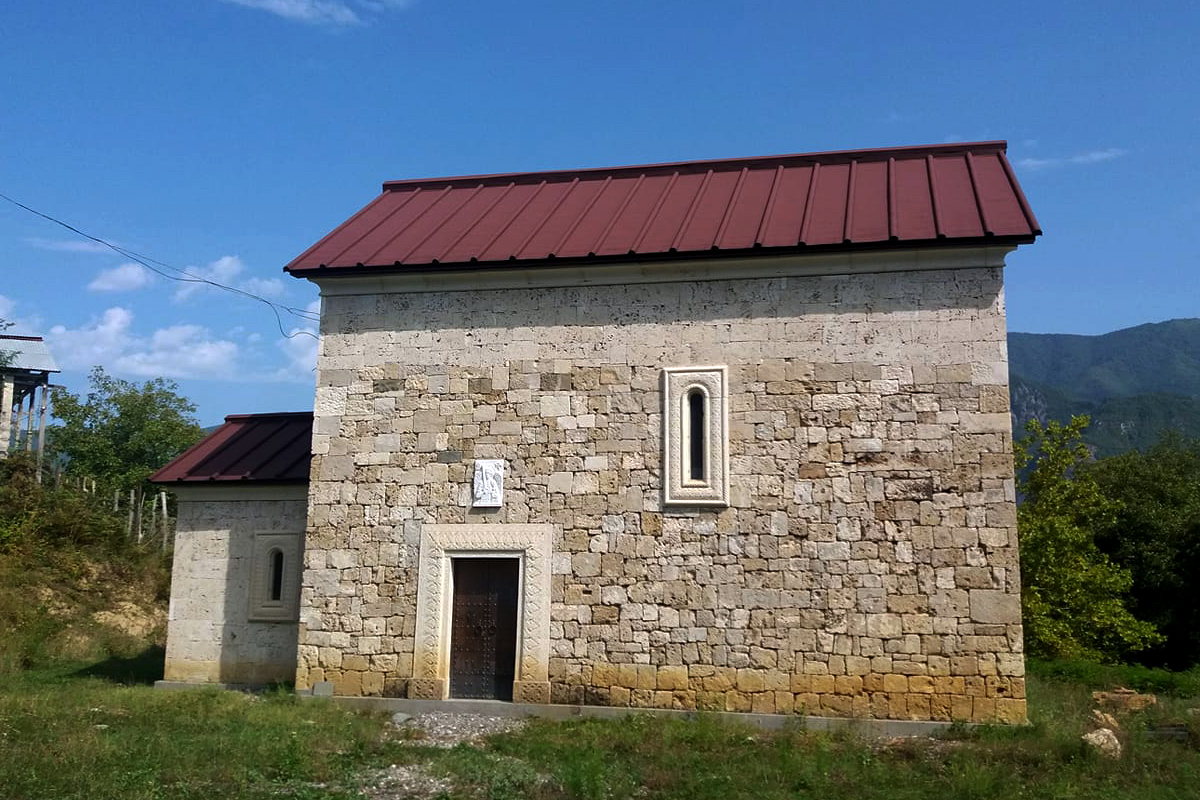
Mikartsminda Church

The historic name of Abanoeti is Mikartsminda (Georgian: Georgian: მიქარწმინდა), named after a 10th-century monastery that stood once here. Named after Archangel Michael, the monastery is one of the oldest monuments of Georgian architecture. Of the monastery itself, however, only the foundation remains.

On the once walled site is currently the St. Michael Archangel Church, which also originally dates from the 10th century. This was rebuilt in the 18th century, and was one of the largest Hall churches in Racha. The old church was distinguished, according to historiography, for its unique frescoes and shrines. The current church was last restored in 2012.

== Demographics ==
According to the 2014 census, Abanoeti had a population of 102 at that time, and all are ethnic Georgians.

Year	1923	-	1989	2002	2014
Number	580	-	138	▼128	▼102
Data
