= Ossetian Military Road =

Road in the Caucasus

Coordinates: 42.6827°N 43.7271°E

The Ossetian Military Road (Russian: Военно-Осетинская дорога, Ossetian: Уæлладжыры фæндаг — Wælladžyry fændag, Georgian: ოსეთის სამხედრო გზა) was constructed between 1854 and 1889, by the Russian Empire in the Caucasus. The road runs through the Rioni and Ardon river valleys and links Kutaisi (Georgia) with Alagir (Russia), crossing the Greater Caucasus crest through the Mamison Pass (Kutaisi-Alpana-Mamison road) at 2,911 metres (9,551 ft). The 270 kilometres (170 mi) long route is seldom used today, having been supplanted by the 1971-1981 construction of the Transcaucasian Highway, which crosses the Caucasus range via the Roki Tunnel. Alternative crossings include the Georgian Military Road, which crosses the Jvari Pass at 2,379 metres (7,805 ft).

The road begins by branching off from the Transkam about three kilometers north of Zaramag hydroelectrical power plant. It crosses into breakaway South Ossetia at Mamison pass, before proceeding into Georgia as შ16 (Sh), proceeding to Oni and from there to Ambrolauri, from there proceeds as შ17 to Tkibuli and Kutaisi.

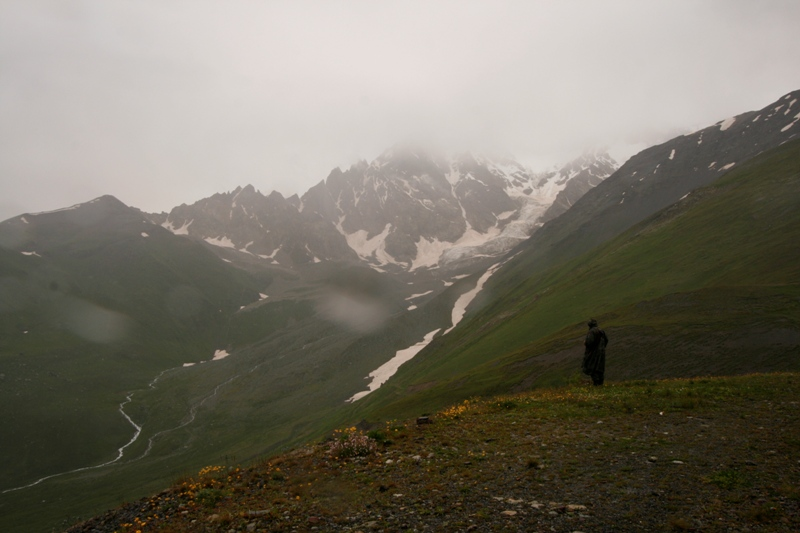
Mamison
