= Uravi =

Uravi ურავი
- Location within Georgia
- Coordinates: 42°38′48″N 43°17′23″E
- Country: Georgia
- Mkhare: Racha-Lechkhumi and Kvemo Svaneti
- Municipality: Ambrolauri
- Elevation: 1,040 m (3,410 ft)

Population (2014)
  - Total: 295
- Time zone: UTC+4 (Georgian Time)

Uravi (Georgian: ურავი) is a village in western Georgia in Ambrolauri District of the Racha-Lechkhumi and Kvemo Svaneti region. It is located on the Lukhunis River, a tributary of the Rioni River that enters from the right (north).

Uravi was the site of an arsenic mine and processing plant when Georgia was part of the USSR, and the arsenic dump above the village leaches arsenic into the soil, the groundwater and the river. The town depopulated after the arsenic factory closed. Plans to reopen the facility were not successful.
