= Znakva =

Populated place in the country of Georgia

Znakva ზნაკვა
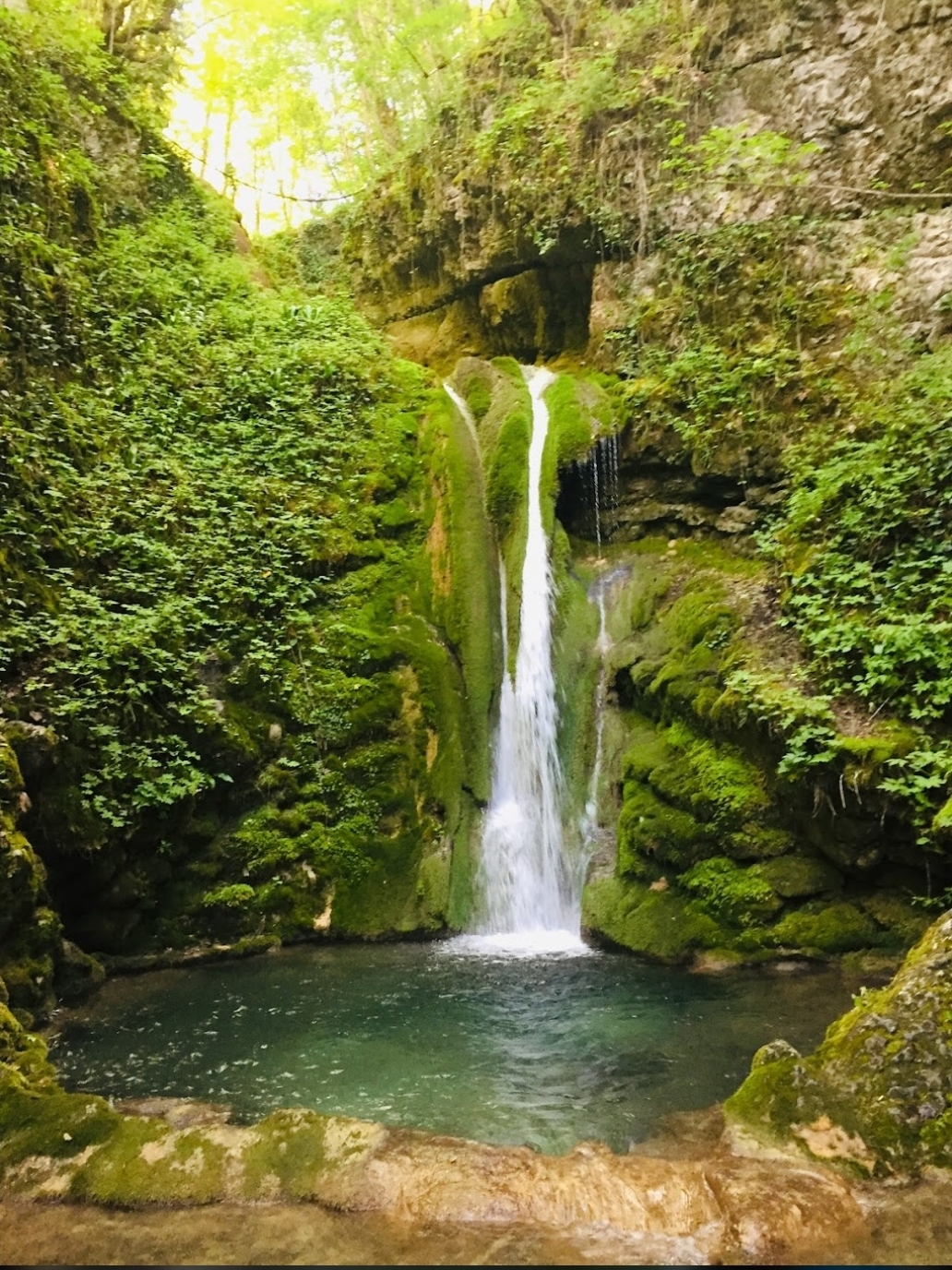

- Location within Georgia
- Coordinates: 42°30′47.2″N 43°04′51.6″E
- Country: Georgia
- Mkhare: Racha-Lechkhumi and Kvemo Svaneti
- Municipality: Ambrolauri

Area
  - Total: 4.39 km^{2} (1.69 sq mi)
- Elevation: 888 m (2,913 ft)

Population (2014)
  - Total: 212
  - Density: 48.29/km^{2} (125.1/sq mi)

Population by Ethnicities
  - Georgians: 98.6%
- Time zone: UTC+4 (Georgian Time)

Znakva is a village in Racha-Lechkhumi and Kvemo Svaneti region of Georgia. Specifically located in the Ambrolauri Municipality of the province.
