= Racha Range =

Mountain range in the southwestern Caucasus Mountains, Georgia

- mount Satsalike

Highest point
- Peak: Lebeuris mta
- Elevation: 2,862.7 m (9,392 ft)
- Prominence: 1,095 m (3,593 ft)
- Listing: Ribu

Dimensions
- Length: 107 km (66 mi)
- Width: 25 km (16 mi)

Geography
- Location within Georgia
- Country: Georgia
- Range coordinates: 42°27′36″N 43°39′07″E
- Parent range: Caucasus Mountains
- Borders on: Greater Caucasus

Geology
- Rock type: Mesozoic

Racha Range (Georgian: რაჭის ქედი) is a longitudinal mountain range in Georgia, a southern part of the Caucasus Mountains. Administratively, the Racha Range is located in Ambrolauri, Oni, Sachkhere and Tkibuli Municipalities.

It extends from the mountain Zekara (3828 m) to Rioni river left side. The length of the ridge is 107 km and width is about 25 km. The highest point of the Racha Range is 2,862.7 metres high mount Lebeuris mta. Other notable peaks include Daghverila (2726 m), Potskhvrevi (2,402.3 m), Khikhata (2239,2 m), Satsalike (1996 m), Veltkevi (1,927.1 m), Garjila (1829 m), Nakerala (1570 m). Multiple passes throughout the range: Leta Pass (3001 m), Khikhata pass (2030 m), Ertso pass (1790 m), Nakerala pass (1218 m) and other. Its eastern part composed mainly jurassic slates and porphyritic series, and west side cretaceous limestone.

Its north side located Shaori karst depression. Racha Range has glacial and karst landform, including cirque, sinkhole and polje. It is mostly covered by broad-leaved forests, beech forest, hardwood forests. Highest part has alpine and subalpine landscapes.
