= Mamison Pass =

- მამისონის უღელტეხილი (in Georgian); Мамысоны æфцæг (in Iron Ossetic); Мамисонский перевал (in Russian)
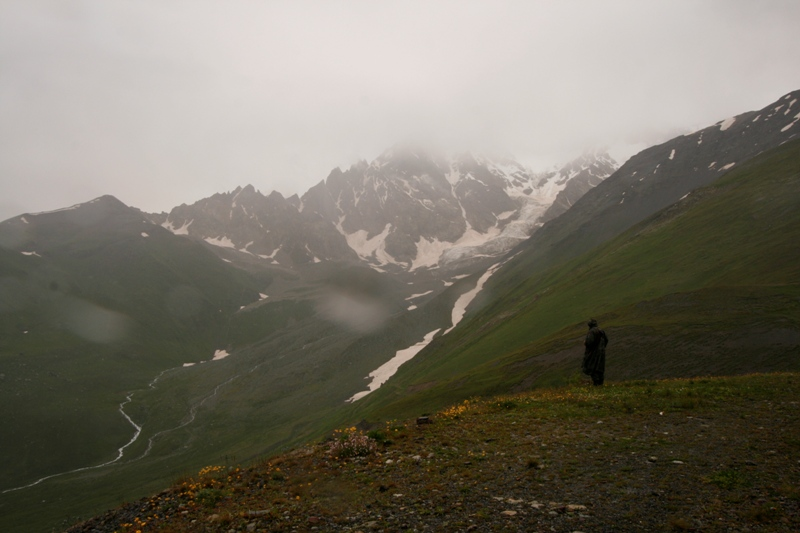

- Location within Georgia Location within South Ossetia Location within North Ossetia–Alania Location within Caucasus Mountains
- Interactive map of Mamison Pass
- Elevation: 2,911 metres (9,551 ft)
- Traversed by: Ossetian Military Road

Third Approach
- Location: Georgia-Russia (North Ossetia–Alania)
- Range: Greater Caucasus
- Coordinates: 42°42′22″N 43°47′35″E

Mamison Pass (Georgian: მამისონის უღელტეხილი, Iron Ossetic: Мамысоны æфцæг [Mamysony æfcæg], Russian: Мамисонский перевал) is a high mountainous pass in the central Greater Caucasus crest, on the Georgian-Russian border. It is crossed by the Ossetian Military Road, a highway that links Kutaisi (Georgia) with Alagir (North Ossetia, Russian Federation). Its peak is 2,911 m.
