= Gebi, Georgia =

Gebi ღები
- Location in Georgia
- Coordinates: 42°45′50″N 43°30′25″E
- Country: Georgia
- Region: Racha-Lechkhumi and Kvemo Svaneti
- Municipality: Oni
- Elevation: 1,350 m (4,430 ft)

Population (2014)
  - Total: 296
- Time zone: UTC+4 (Georgian Time)

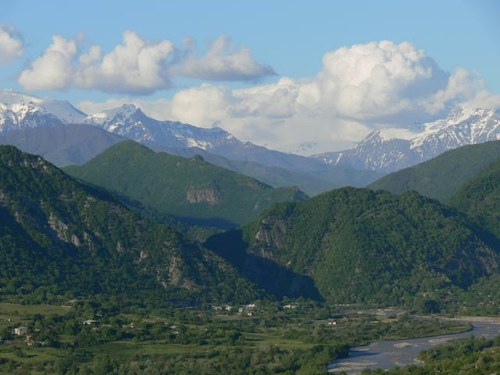
Mountains surrounding Gebi

Gebi (Georgian: ღები; literally from Svan language: "depression") is an old village in the northern part of Georgia, in the region of Racha. From the northern slopes of Caucasus Gebi is bordered by Russia. Gebi with other two villages (Chiora, Glola) creates one ethno-cultural area, called Mtaracha (Georgian: მთარაჭა). Gebi covers a territory of 355 km^{2}.

== Archaeological history ==
The history of the village Gebi is very rich. It counts more than 3500 years of cultural life. Archaeological excavations, which took place in the Soviet times revealed a huge necropolis in the place of Brili. An oldest cultural layer belongs to the middle Bronze Age, but everything shows that this part of Racha region was occupied from the earlier times. Here, on the southern slopes of Caucasus were one of the oldest metallurgical centres of ancient world, products were distributed in other parts of Caucasus and Georgia.

Cultural life continues in the Late Bronze-early Iron period, Archaeological remains of this time show similarity to the Colchian and Koban cultures. In the antique age the village shows strong trade relationships with Greek cities of Black Sea region. Several archaeological sites of this period show connections with Egypt and Scythian world.
In the Middle Ages Mtaracha (Gebi, Chiora, Glola) belonged to Dvaleti, then it was part of Svaneti. From the beginning of the 16th century it became part of Racha principality.

== Cultural history ==
Christian culture spreads in the 4th century. Earliest churches belong to the 9th-10th centuries. Argument about whether this part of Georgia belonged to Racha, Svaneti or Dvaleti is very complicated. Until the 16th century, Racha Svaneti and Dvaleti all made up one principality and was known as one Duchy of Georgia.

However, in the 16th century these regions split up and as a result Racha and Dvaleti became one Principality while Svaneti became other. Later on, historical Dvaleti region which includes today's Nari gorge and also another old settlement called Nar became part of Russia in the 19th century. Due to political uncertainty in Georgia after Bolshevik revolts in Samachablo this historic part of Racha became Part of Russia (North Ossetian Autonomous Republic). Mta-Racha was area of constant conflict between Rachians Dvaletians and Svans however by the end it was considered as part of Rachian Duchy. The name of the settlement Chiora (the nearby settlement, right next to Ghebi) comes from the Rachian dialectic word Ciora. According to legend, the original Ciorians lived deeper in Caucasus mountain chain. However, because of hard pressure over them by the Ossetians and Balkars, they asked permission from Ghebians to settle near the village. As they did they asked Ghebians if there was any "Cioreuli" (mammals such as bears, dears, etc.) in the area. For that reason new settlers called the area Ciora or the place where there are the mammals.
