= Tkhmori =

Tkhmori თხმორი
- Location within Georgia
- Coordinates: 42°29′29″N 42°55′57″E
- Country: Georgia
- Mkhare: Racha-Lechkhumi and Kvemo Svaneti
- Municipality: Ambrolauri
- Elevation: 840 m (2,760 ft)

Population (2014)
  - Total: 36
- Time zone: UTC+4 (Georgian Time)

Tkhmori (Georgian: თხმორი) is a village in the Ambrolauri Municipality of Racha-Lechkhumi and Kvemo Svaneti in northern Georgia.
