= Barakoni =

Church in Ambrolauri, Georgia

Barakoni Church of the Mother of God ბარაკონის ღვთისმშობლის ტაძარი
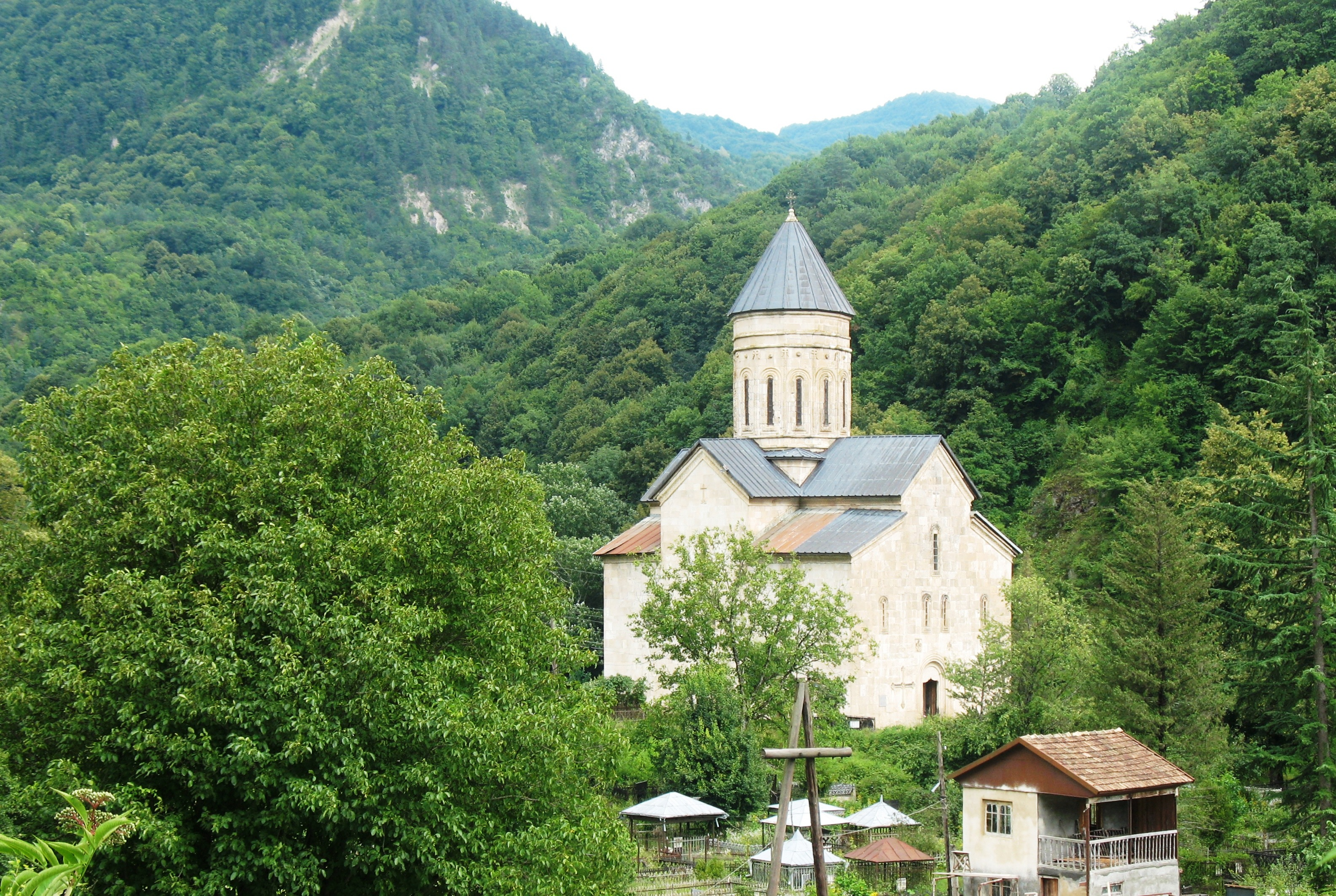

- Location within Georgia

Religion
- Affiliation: Georgian Orthodox Church
- District: Racha (historic region)
- Region: Caucasus

Location
- Location: Tsesi, Racha-Lechkhumi and Kvemo Svaneti Province (Mkhare), Georgia
- Coordinates: 42.538889°N 43.21°E

Architecture
- Architect: Avtandil Shulavreli
- Type: Georgian; Church
- Style: Domed cruciform plan
- Founder: Rostom of Racha
- Groundbreaking: 1753
- Dome: 1

Barakoni Church of the Mother of God (Georgian: ბარაკონის ღვთისმშობლის ტაძარი), commonly known as Barakoni (ბარაკონი), is an Orthodox church in Georgia, near the town of Ambrolauri, in the village of Tsesi of mountainous western province of Racha (modern-day Racha-Lechkhumi and Kvemo Svaneti).

Barakoni was commissioned, in 1753, by the local lord (eristavi) Rostom of Racha (1750-1769) from the architect Avtandil Shulavreli who is commemorated in the inscription of the eastern façade. It is a domed cruciform church and one of the last important monuments in the tradition of medieval Georgian architecture. The church was built of neatly trimmed stable stand stones and adorned with rich ornamentation. The church was closed and desecrated under the Bolshevik rule. It suffered further damage, though not serious, in the 1991 Racha earthquake, but was quickly repaired. Located on a top of a steep cliff, it overlooks Rioni River which is joined the Lukhuni River just below the mountain.
