= Tkibuli =

City in Imereti, Georgia

Tkibuli ტყიბული
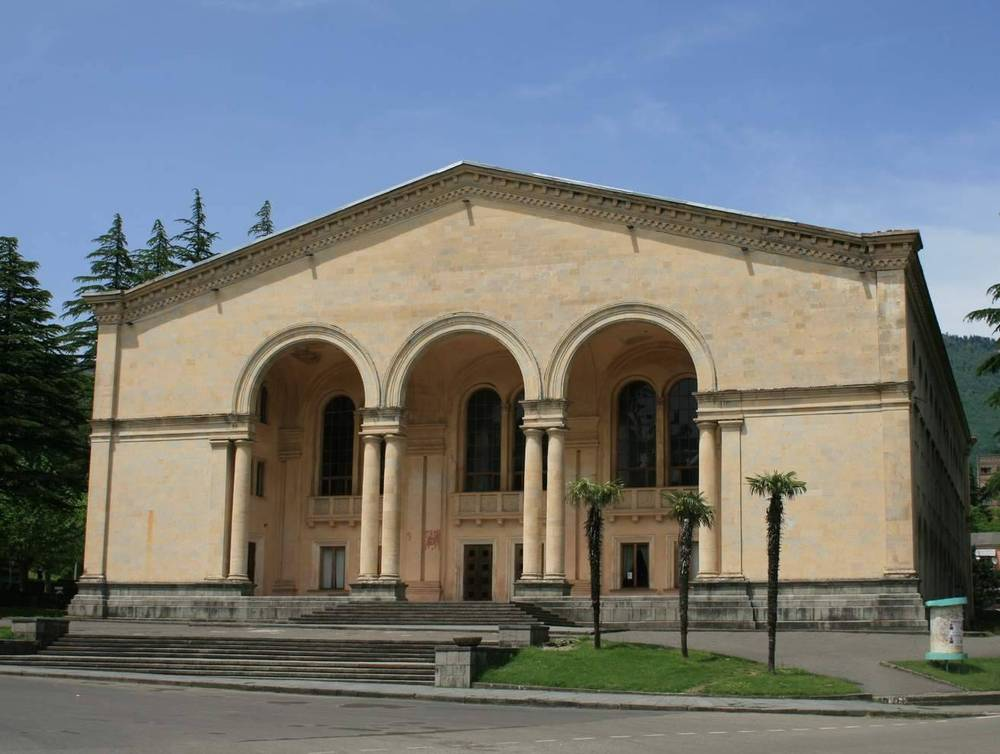
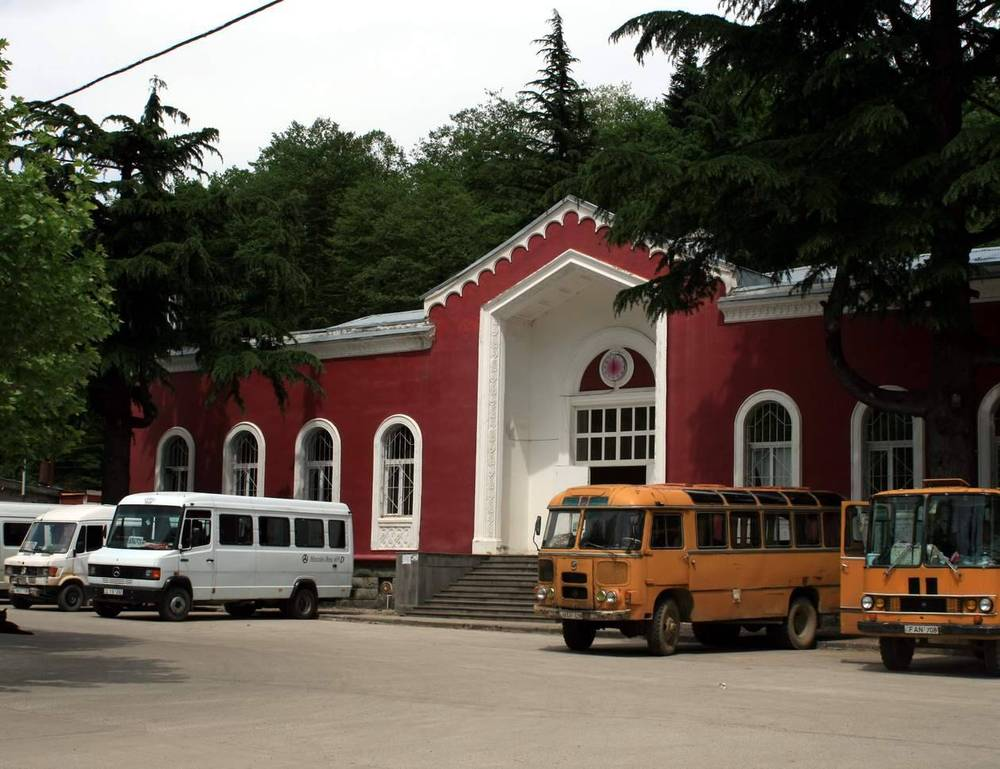
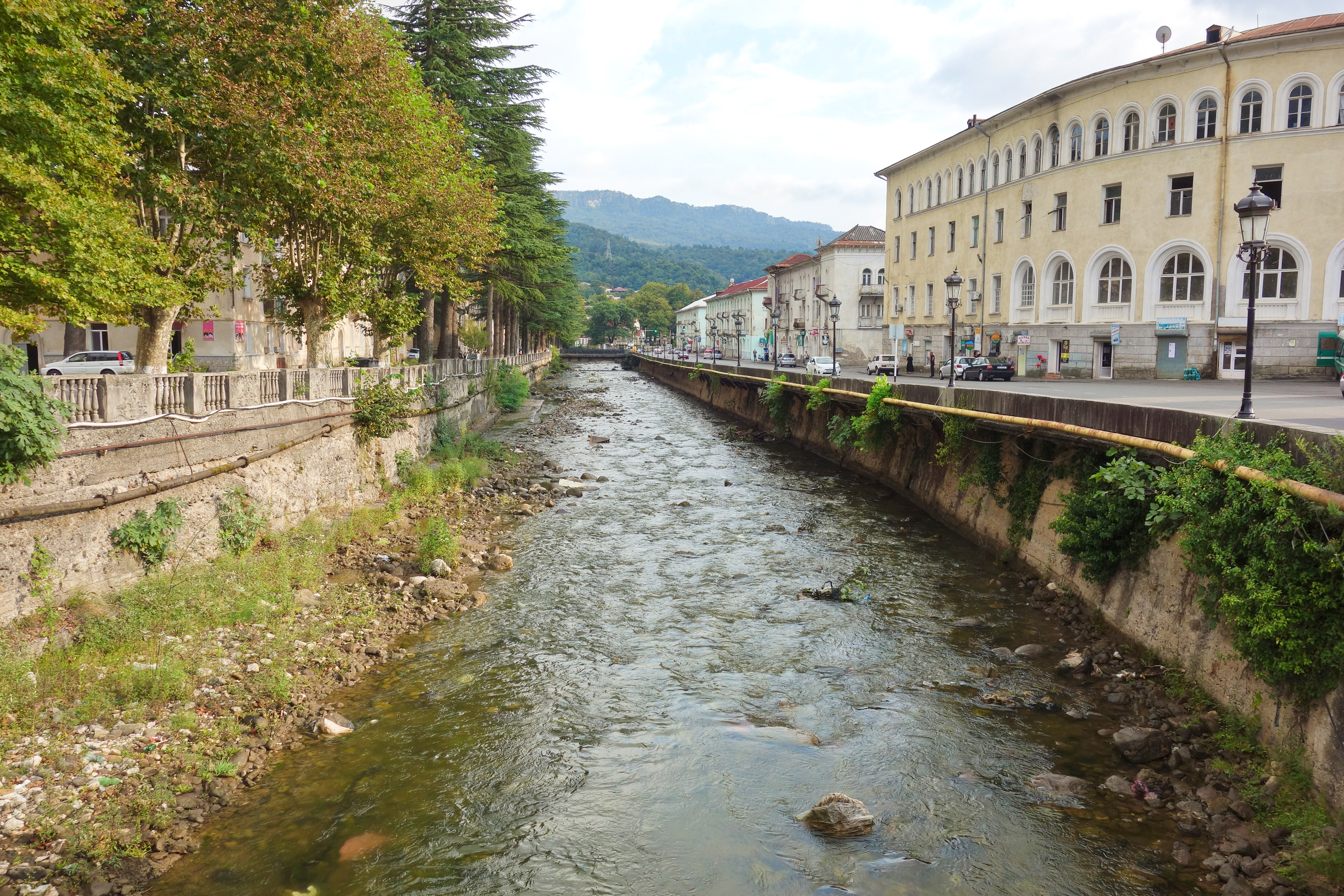
- Tkibuli Main Square Tkibuli Theatre Train station River Tkibula

- Flag Seal

- Location within Georgia Location within Imereti
- Coordinates: 42°21′01″N 42°59′54″E
- Country: Georgia
- Region (Mkhare): Imereti
- Municipality: Tkibuli Municipality

Population (1 January 2024)
  - Total: 8,130
- Time zone: UTC+4 (Georgian Time)
- Area code: (+995)
- Climate: Cfa
- Website: tkibuli.gov.ge

Tkibuli or Tqibuli (Georgian: ტყიბული [ˈt'χ'ibuli]) is a town in west-central Georgia of 8,130 residents (January 2024). located in the Imereti region at the foot of the Racha Range and the Nakerala limestone cliff, which marks the boundary of the historic region Racha. Tkibuli gained city status in 1939, and has been a coal mining center since mining started in 1846. The city is also known for the tea that is grown in the region and sold throughout the country. It is located between two man-made reservoirs used for hydropower generation with an elevation difference of more than 600 metres (2,000 ft).

At the height of mining in the Soviet-era Tkibuli had more than 20,000 residents, but the economic disarray of the 1990s caused an exodus from the city and the mines practically halted production. Since production has resumed in 2008 by a Georgian company, the mines are a mainstay of local economy providing 2,000 people and their families the only source of income. However, the mines have become notorious for fatal accidents due to outdated equipment and inappropriate safety standards. After a series of fatal accidents, claiming 16 lives in total in 2018, mining was put on hold in late 2018 but resumed again in 2019.
