= Tkibuli Municipality =

Coordinates: 42°20′30″N 42°59′30″E

Tkibuli Municipality ტყიბულის მუნიციპალიტეტი
- Municipality
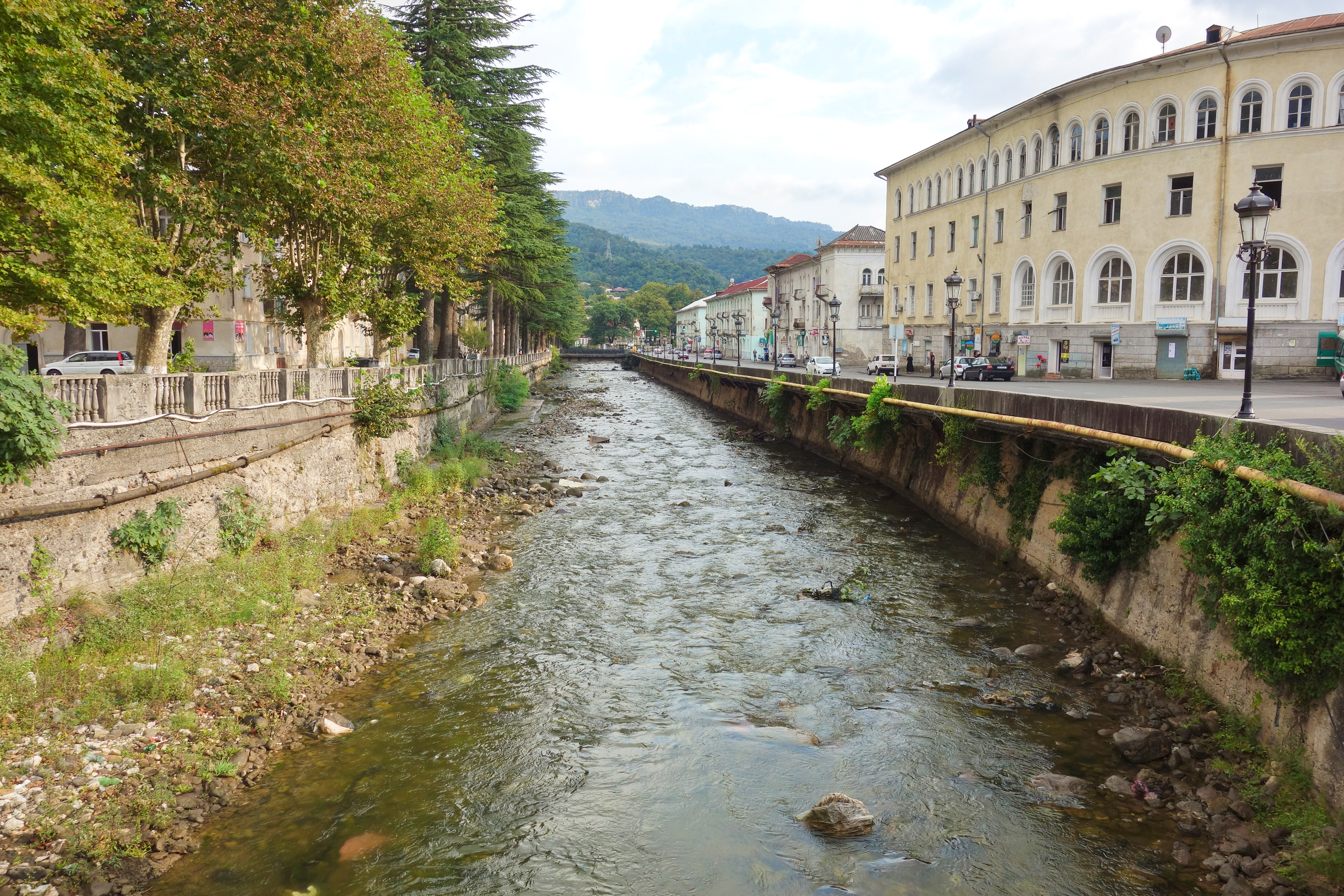
- River in the town of Tkibuli

- Flag Seal

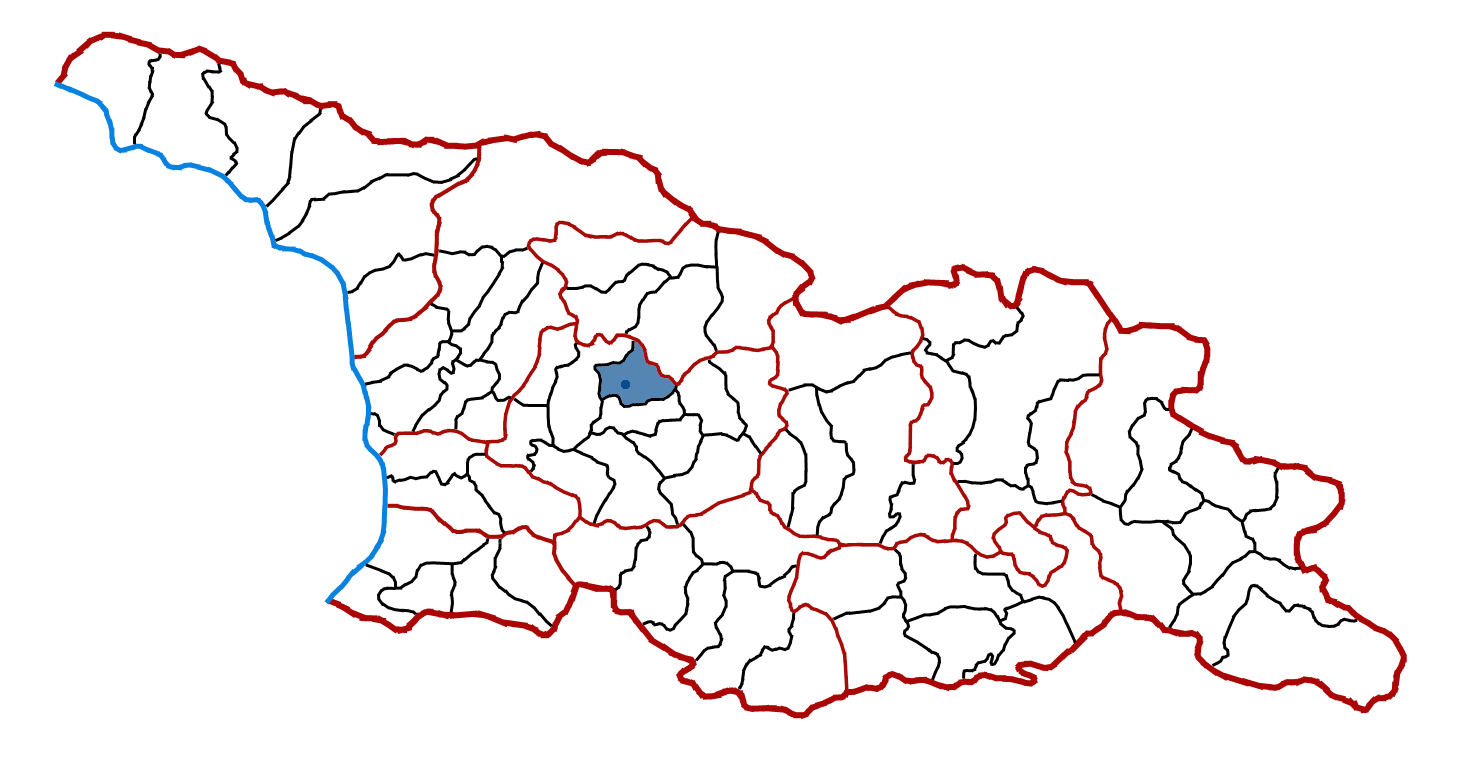
- Location of the municipality within Georgia
- Country: Georgia
- Region: Imereti
- Capital: Tkibuli

Government
  - Type: Mayor–Council
  - Body: Tkibuli Municipal Assembly
  - Mayor: Temur Chubinidze (GD)

Area
  - Total: 479 km^{2} (185 sq mi)

Population (2014)
  - Total: 20,839

Population by ethnicity
  - Georgians: 99.1 %
  - Russians: 0.4 %
  - Ukrainians: 0.2 %
- Time zone: UTC+4 (Georgian Standard Time)

Tkibuli (Georgian: ტყიბულის მუნიციპალიტეტი) is a district of Georgia, in the region of Imereti. Its main town is Tkibuli. This area of Georgia is also known as Okriba, its historical and geographical name.

It has an area of 479 km^{2} and had a population of 20,839 as of the 2014 census.

== Politics ==
Tkibuli Municipal Assembly (Georgian: ტყიბულის საკრებულო) is a representative body in Tkibuli Municipality, consisting of 27 members and elected every four years. The last election was held in October 2021.

Party	2017	2021	Current Municipal Assembly
Georgian Dream	19	17	
United National Movement	4	8	
For Georgia		1	
Lelo		1	
European Georgia	2		
Alliance of Patriots	1		
Free Georgia	1		
Total	25	27	

== See also ==
- List of municipalities in Georgia (country)
