= Nikortsminda Cathedral =

Georgian Orthodox cathedral in Nikortsminda, Georgia

Nikortsminda Cathedral ნიკორწმინდის ტაძარი
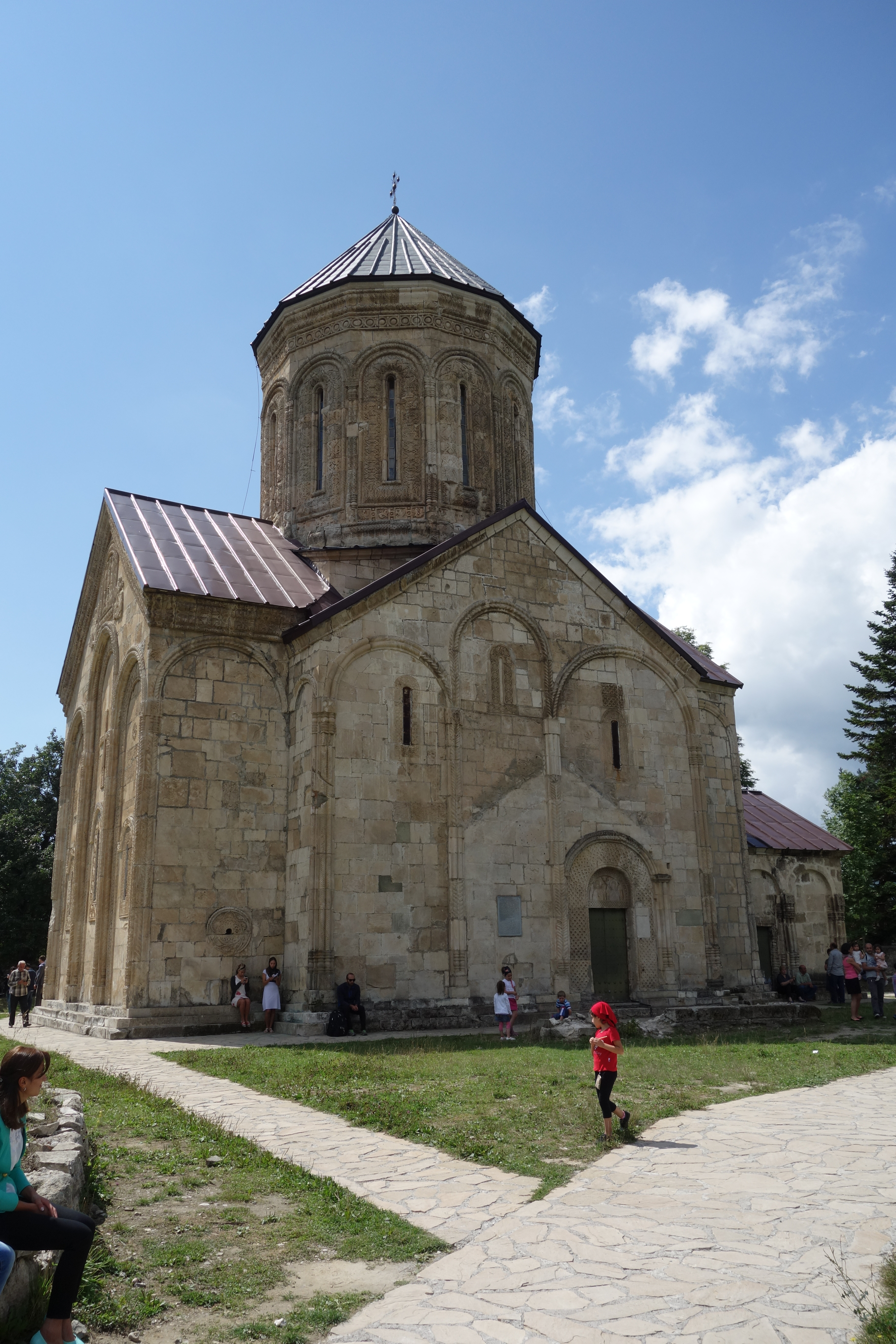
- Nikortsminda Cathedral

- Location within Georgia

Religion
- Affiliation: Georgian Orthodox Church
- District: Racha (historic region)
- Region: Caucasus
- Status: Active

Location
- Location: Nikortsminda, Racha-Lechkhumi and Kvemo Svaneti Province (Mkhare), Georgia
- Coordinates: 42.4594°N 43.0878°E

Architecture
- Type: Domed cruciform plan
- Style: Georgian; Cathedral
- Groundbreaking: 1010
- Completed: 1014; Belfry: late 19th century
- Dome: 1

Nikortsminda Cathedral (Georgian: ნიკორწმინდის ტაძარი, romanized: nik'orts'mindis t'adzari) is a Georgian Orthodox Church, located in Nikortsminda, Racha region of Georgia.

Nikortsminda was built in 1010–1014 during the reign of Bagrat III of Georgia and was repaired in 1534 by the King Bagrat III of Imereti. Three-storied bell-tower next to the cathedral was built in the second half of the 19th century. Frescoes inside the cathedral date from the 17th century. The cathedral was damaged in the 1991 Racha earthquake and subsequently restored.

The cathedral is on the Tentative List for status as a UNESCO World Heritage Site.

== Details ==
Stylistically, Nikortsminda reflects the Georgian cross-dome style of architecture, following a six-conch-within-rectangle plan. The rectangular western apse has adjoining side chapels.

=== Dome ===
Nikortsminda has a massive dome and unbroken arcatures as its twelve windows, which are decorated with ornamented architraves.

=== Interior ===
The cathedral is formed of five interior apses, from which rise the massive dome, resting upon half-pillar shaped apse projections. It is abundantly lit by the twelve windows of the drum. The transition from the hexahedron of the round drum to the dome circle is effected by means of spheric pendentives. The altar apse bema and the western passage enlarge the interior space. The interior is decorated with frescoes from the 17th century and ornamental sculptural reliefs, reflecting the mastery of the late-Medieval Georgian ecclesiastical art.

=== Exterior ===
The cathedral follows a short-armed rectangular cross plan and has a short segment to the west. The facades of the cathedral are covered with smoothly hewn stone. Decorations include unbroken arcatures and various rich ornaments, including multiple-figured narrative reliefs and episodes (The Transfiguration, The Judgment Day, The Ascension of the Cross, figures of Saint George and Saint Theodore, real and mythic animals, forming one premeditated program). Nikortsminda has among the most beautiful decorations of all Georgian churches and cathedrals as several different styles can be seen.

== Gallery ==
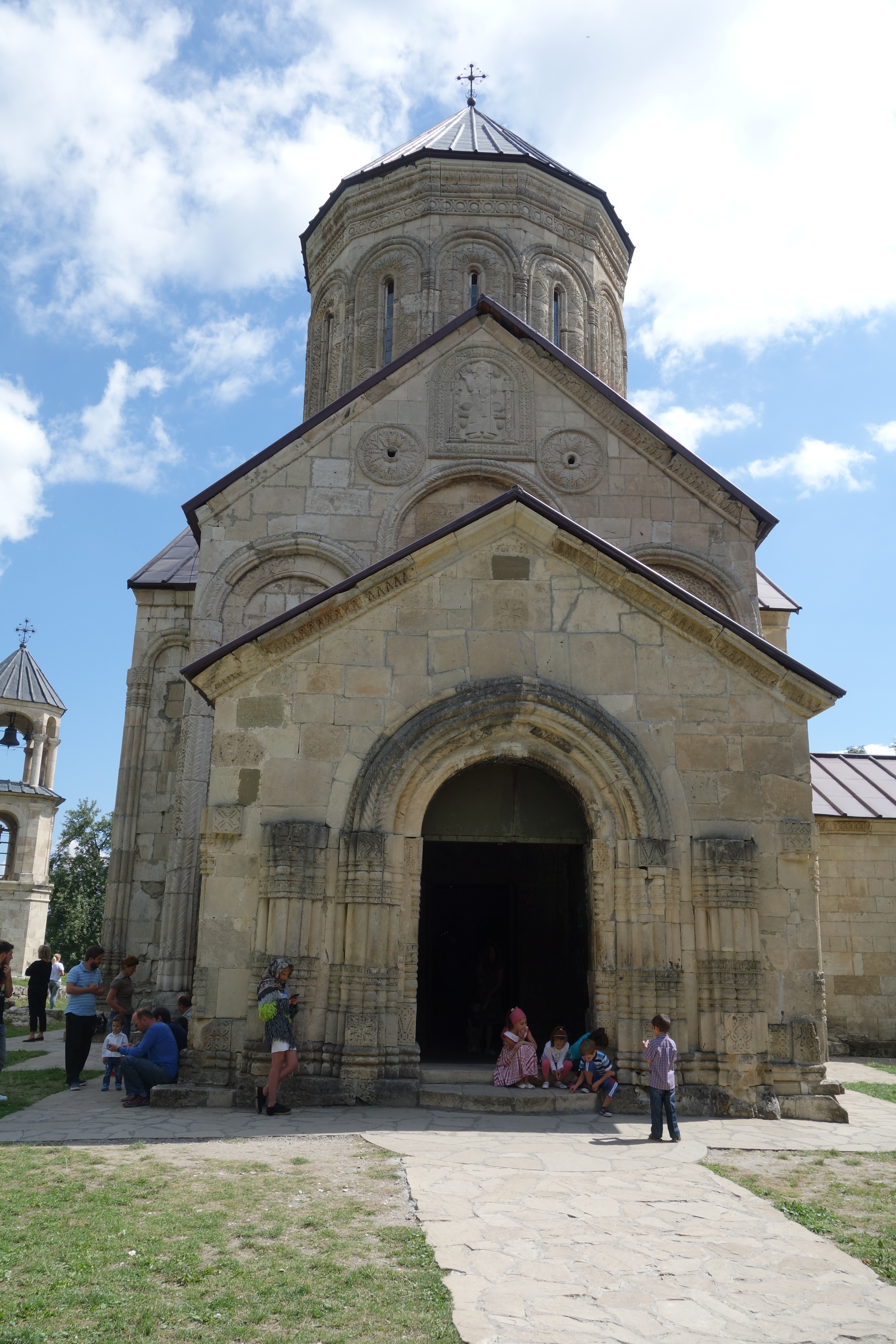

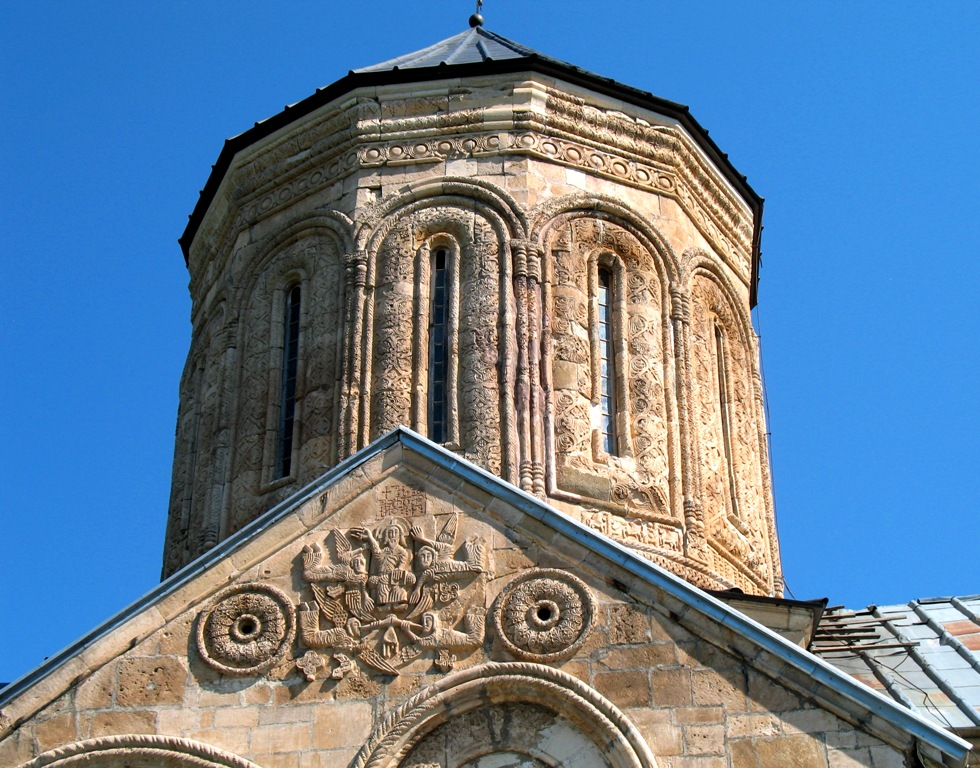

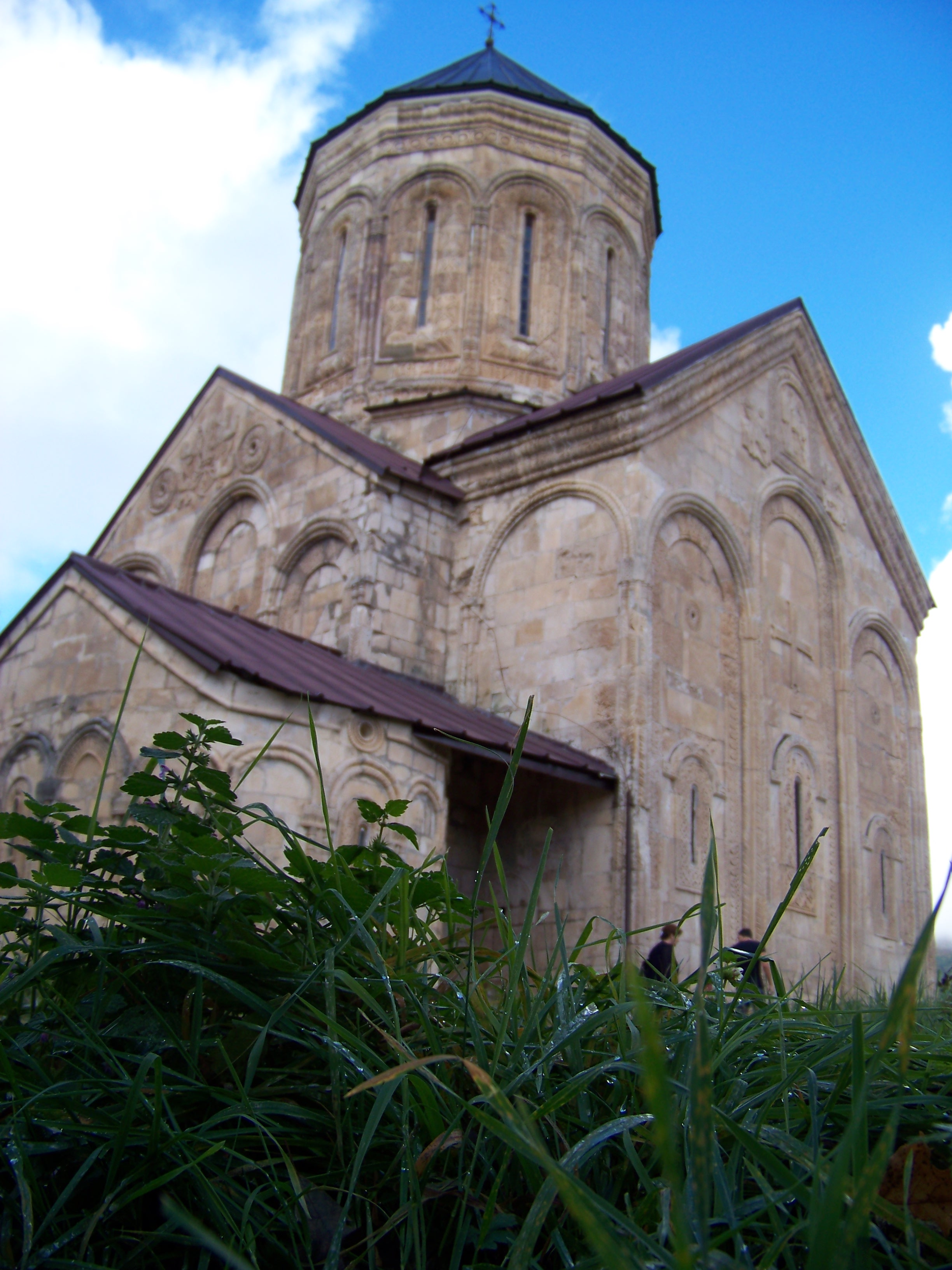

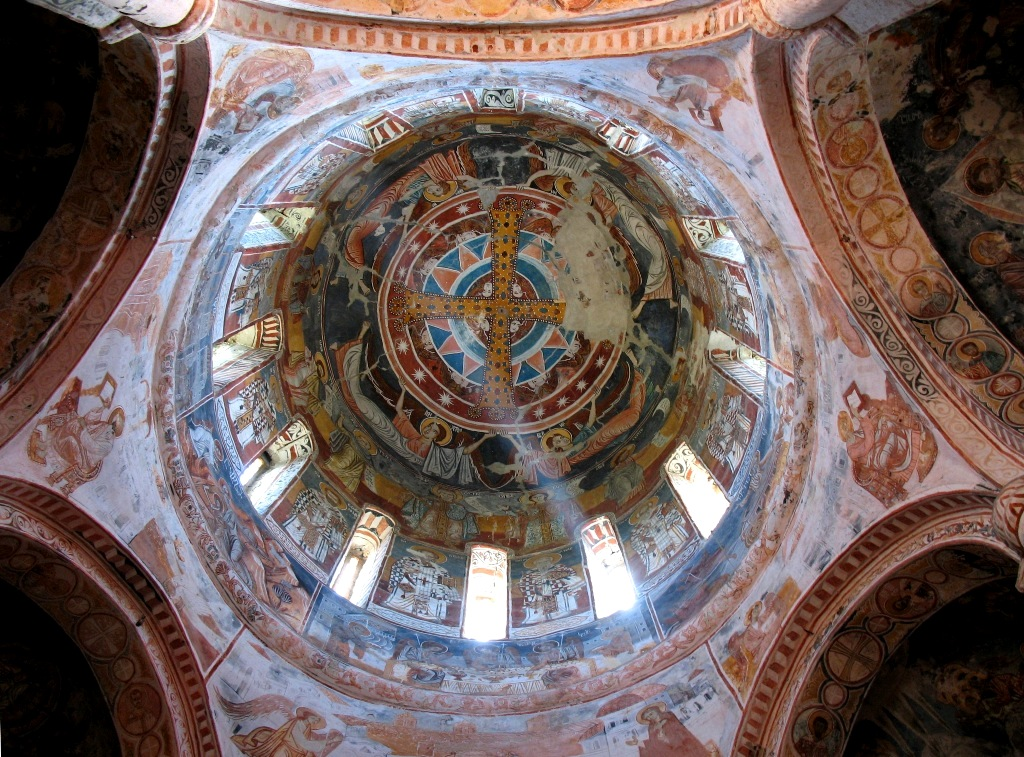
Frescoes on the dome interior.

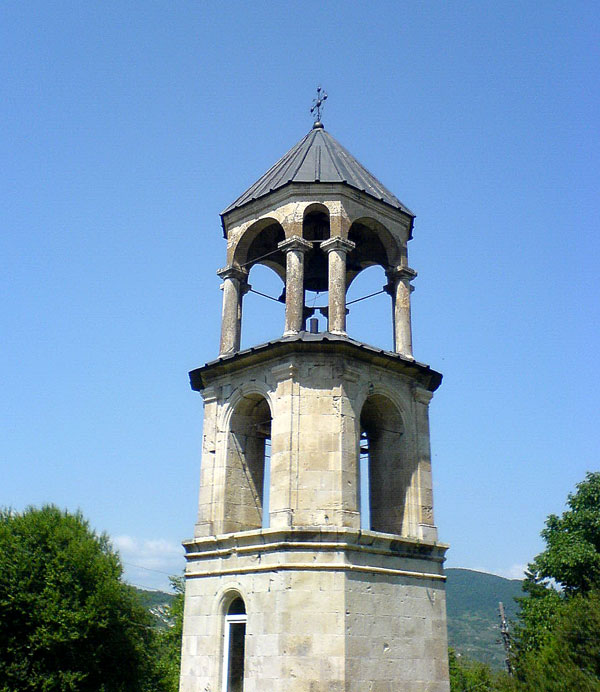
Belfry, 19th century
