= Ambrolauri =

Ambrolauri ამბროლაური
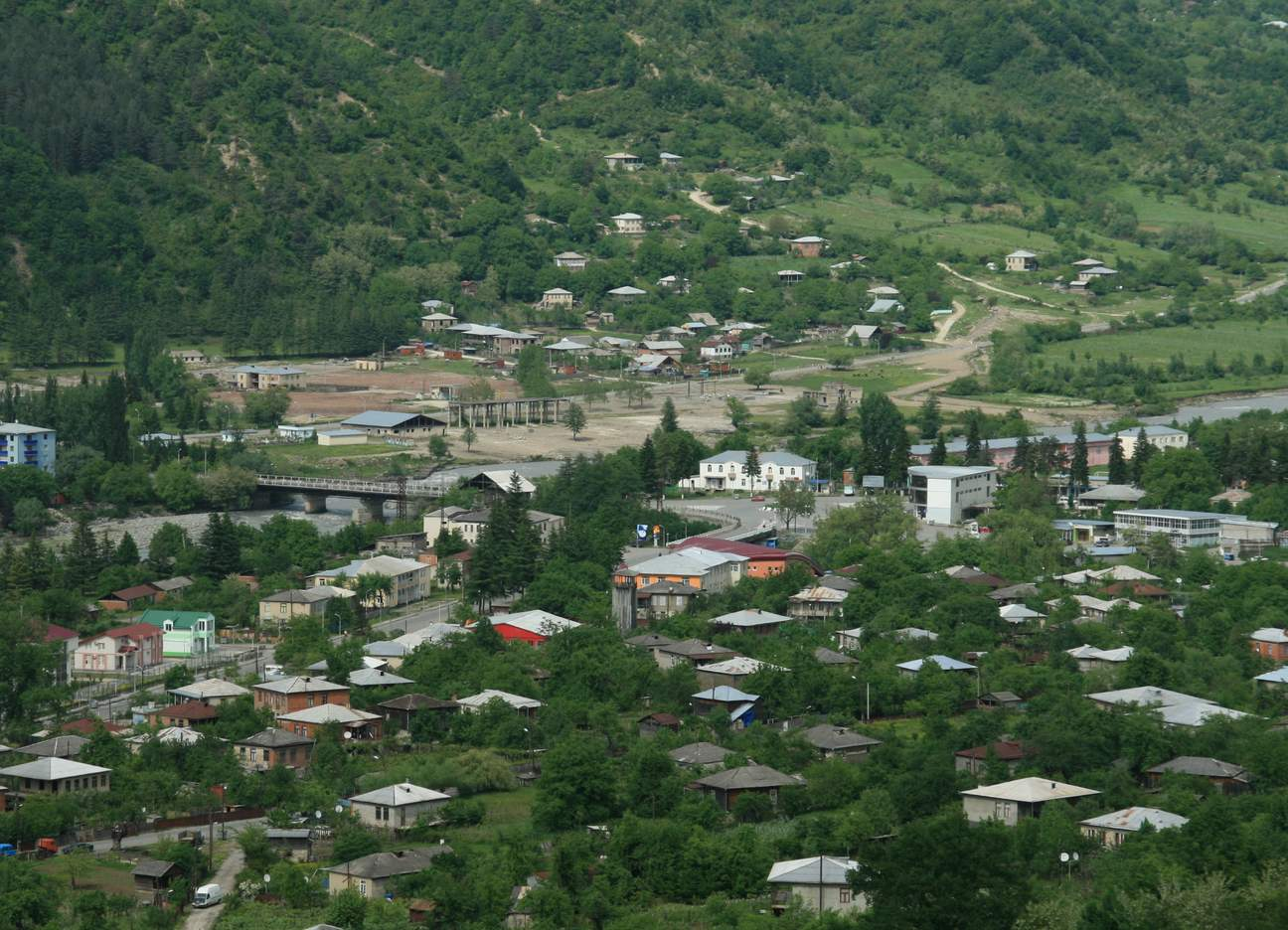
- View of Ambrolauri in 2011

- Flag Seal
- Interactive map of Ambrolauri
- Location within Georgia Location within Racha-Lechkhumi and Kvemo Svaneti
- Coordinates: 42°31′10″N 43°09′00″E
- Country: Georgia
- Mkhare: Racha-Lechkhumi and Kvemo Svaneti
- Municipality: Ambrolauri

Area
  - Total: 2.6 km^{2} (1.0 sq mi)
- Elevation: 550 m (1,800 ft)

Population (2024)
  - Total: 1,961
  - Density: 750/km^{2} (2,000/sq mi)
- Time zone: UTC+4 (Georgian Time)
- Post code: 0400
- Area code: +995 439
- Website: ambrolauri.gov.ge

Ambrolauri (Georgian: ამბროლაური [ˈämbɾo̞ɫäuɾi]) is a city in Georgia, located in the northwestern part of the country, on both banks of the Rioni river, at an elevation of 550 m above sea level. The city serves as the seat of the Racha-Lechkhumi and Kvemo Svaneti regional administration and of the Ambrolauri Municipality and had a population of 2,015 in 2021. Its area is 2.8 km^{2}. Ambrolauri was first recorded in the 17th century as a place where one of the palaces of the kings of Imereti was located. It acquired the city status in 1966.

== History ==
The territory of Ambrolauri has not been systematically studied archaeologically. The toponym Ambrolauri is known from the 17th century. The Russian diplomat Alexey Yevlev, who visited the Kingdom of Imereti in 1650, and then the Georgian scholar Prince Vakhushti of Kartli, writing c. 1745, mention a royal castle at Ambrolauri, where the Krikhula River becomes a tributary of the Rioni. Only insignificant ruins of that palace have survived. The name of the city may have been derived from the surname Amarolisdze, while the settlement could have earlier been known as Metekhara, a toponym recorded in the 11th-century charter to the Nikortsminda Cathedral.

In 1769, the Imeretian king Solomon I granted Ambrolauri to a prince from the Machabeli family, Zurab, an in-law of the Tsulukidze, one of the leading families in Racha. An old three-storey tower built of stone and lime, located in the city, is still known to the locals as the Machabeli Tower. Ruins of a stone hall church are also found nearby. An inscription from the church doorway makes mention of King George III of Imereti (r. 1605–1639) and his family. A hoard of hundreds of coins buried early in the 17th century, including those with Arabic inscription stuck at Tbilisi and those issued in the name of George II of Imereti (r. 1565–1585), was unearthed in 1909.

After the Russian conquest of Imereti in 1810, Ambrolauri became a part of the Racha district (uyezd). In Soviet Georgia, it became the seat of the Ambrolauri district (raion) in 1930 and acquired the city status in 1966. In 1934, Ambrolauri was renamed into Enukidze after the Soviet statesman Avel Yenukidze, upon whose execution in 1937, the city's old name was restored. In 1968, Ambrolauri had a population of 4,400.

The city was damaged by the 1991 Racha earthquake. It experienced a demographic decline and economic activity in the years of post-Soviet crisis. Ambrolauri became the seat of Racha-Lechkhumi and Kvemo Svaneti regional administration in 1995. As a result of the local government reform in 2014, Ambrolauri was split from the homonymous municipality as a self-governing city and the city's population directly elected its first mayor ever. In 2017, this decision was reverted and Ambrolauri, like six other cities, lost its self-governing status again when the central government deemed this reform too expensive and inefficient.

== Climate ==
Highest recorded temperature: 41.8 °C (107.2 °F) on 30 July 2000

Lowest recorded temperature: −19.0 °C (−2.2 °F) on 30 December 2006

Climate data for Ambrolauri (1991–2020, extremes 1981-present)
Month	Jan	Feb	Mar	Apr	May	Jun	Jul	Aug	Sep	Oct	Nov	Dec	Year
Record high °C (°F)	17.0 (62.6)	23.0 (73.4)	28.3 (82.9)	33.5 (92.3)	35.5 (95.9)	36.9 (98.4)	41.8 (107.2)	41.2 (106.2)	39.5 (103.1)	33.5 (92.3)	24.2 (75.6)	19.8 (67.6)	41.8 (107.2)
Mean daily maximum °C (°F)	5.6 (42.1)	8.4 (47.1)	13.2 (55.8)	18.8 (65.8)	23.8 (74.8)	27.5 (81.5)	30.0 (86.0)	30.7 (87.3)	26.5 (79.7)	20.7 (69.3)	13.1 (55.6)	7.0 (44.6)	18.8 (65.8)
Mean daily minimum °C (°F)	−3.1 (26.4)	−2.3 (27.9)	1.5 (34.7)	5.6 (42.1)	10.1 (50.2)	13.9 (57.0)	16.9 (62.4)	16.8 (62.2)	12.9 (55.2)	7.8 (46.0)	2.0 (35.6)	−1.8 (28.8)	6.7 (44.1)
Record low °C (°F)	−17.8 (0.0)	−18.8 (−1.8)	−12.4 (9.7)	−5.5 (22.1)	0.0 (32.0)	4.5 (40.1)	5.5 (41.9)	7.0 (44.6)	1.0 (33.8)	−3.5 (25.7)	−9.0 (15.8)	−19.0 (−2.2)	−19.0 (−2.2)
Average precipitation mm (inches)	83.4 (3.28)	62.9 (2.48)	86.2 (3.39)	80.1 (3.15)	102.2 (4.02)	91.0 (3.58)	83.3 (3.28)	75.8 (2.98)	91.5 (3.60)	116.1 (4.57)	91.6 (3.61)	91.0 (3.58)	1,055.2 (41.54)
Average precipitation days (≥ 1.0 mm)	11.6	9.4	10.7	10.8	11.8	10.5	7.6	7.1	8.2	9.1	10	10.2	117
Source: NOAA

== Government ==
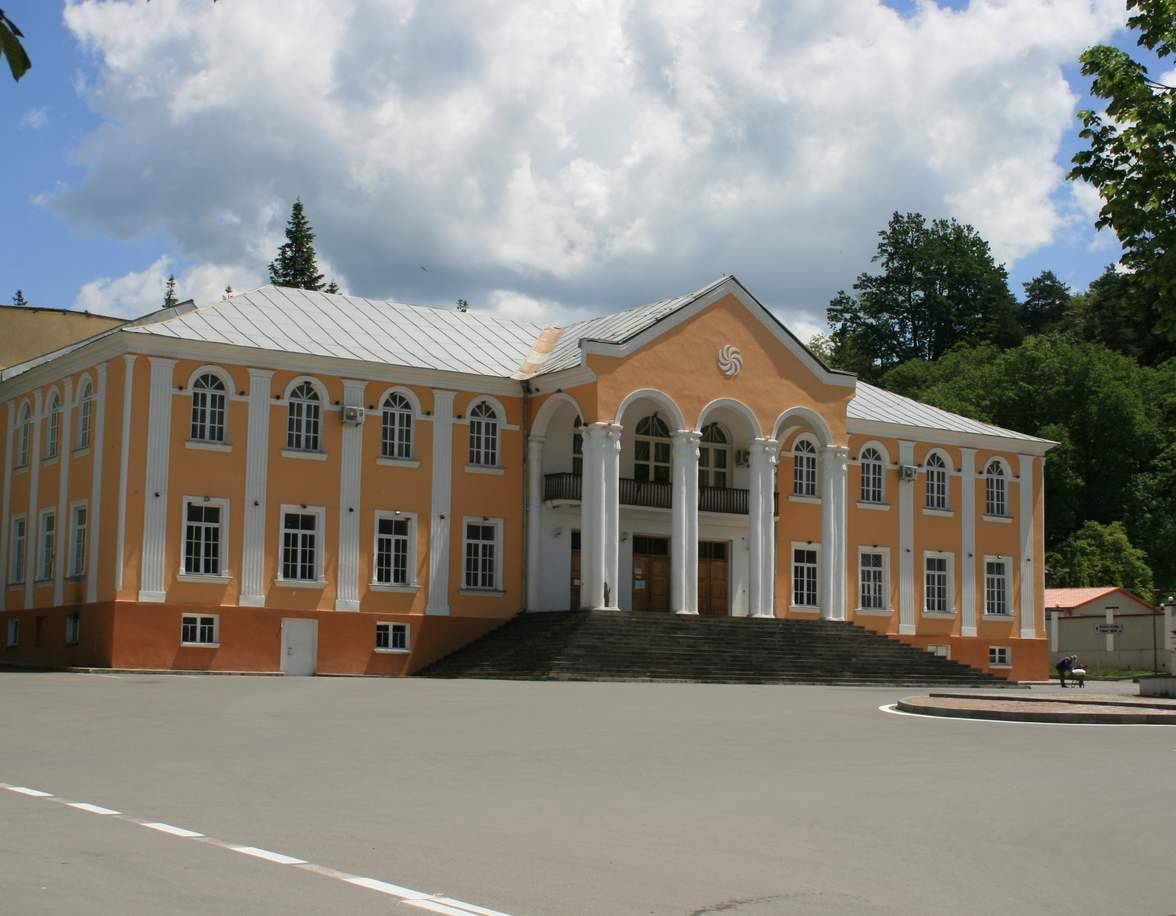
Ambrolauri Museum of Fine Arts

between 2014 and 2017 Ambrolauri was a self-governing city with its own municipal governance—a representative council (sakrebulo) and an executive body headed by a mayor. Effective the 2017 local election cycle, the governance of the City of Ambrolauri merged back with the Ambrolauri Municipality, a self-governing territorial subdivision. Both the council and mayor are elected for a four-year term since 2017. As result of the roll-back of the self-governing status, the city only had its own mayor for one 3-year term.

Mayors of Ambrolauri
Name	Party	Years
Rati Namgaladze, b. 1965	Georgian Dream	2014 – 2017

Ambrolauri is the seat of the State Commissioner (or governor), representing Georgia's central government in the city of Ambrolauri and four other municipalities grouped together into the Racha-Lechkhumi and Kvemo Svaneti region. Ambrolauri also houses the bodies of local self-government of the Ambrolauri Municipality, which is a separate self-governing community.

== Culture ==
Ambrolauri is home to the Museum of Fine Arts, and a theatre. The environs of Ambrolauri are rich in historical monuments such as the churches of Barakoni and Nikortsminda. A recreational zone is being developed at Shaori Lake, south of Ambrolauri.

== Transportation ==
Ambrolauri is served by an airport, opened in January 2017, which can serve small planes carrying 15–20 passengers. Its runway is 1.1 km long and a terminal of 600 square meters can serve about 50 people at a time.
