= Racha =

Historical region in Georgia (country)

Coordinates: 42°38′10″N 43°26′10″E

Racha რაჭა
- Historical Region
- Map highlighting the historical region of Racha in Georgia
- Country: Georgia
- Mkhare: Racha-Lechkhumi and Kvemo Svaneti
- Capital: Oni

Area
  - Total: 2,893 km^{2} (1,117 sq mi)

Population
  - Total: 15,000
  - Density: 5.2/km^{2} (13/sq mi)

Racha (also Račha, Georgian: რაჭა [ˈɾät͡ʃ'ä], Račʼa) is a highland area in western Georgia, located in the upper Rioni river valley and hemmed in by the Greater Caucasus mountains. Under Georgia's current subdivision, Racha is included in the Racha-Lechkhumi and Kvemo Svaneti region (mkhare) as the municipalities of Oni and Ambrolauri. Native inhabitants of Racha are called Rachians, an ethnographic group of Georgians.

Racha occupies 2,854 km^{2} in the north-eastern corner of western Georgia. Spurs of the Greater Caucasus crest separates Racha from the Georgian historical regions of Svaneti and Lechkhumi on the north-west and from Imereti on the south, while the main Caucasus ridge forms a boundary with Russia’s North Ossetia. On the east, Racha is bordered by breakaway South Ossetia, officially part of Georgia's Shida Kartli region.

== History ==
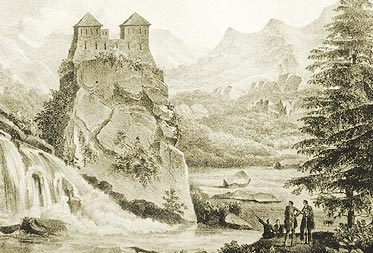
An old fortress in Racha in the 19th century.

Racha had been part of Colchis and Caucasian Iberia since ancient times and its main town Oni was said to have been founded by King Parnajom of Iberia in the 2nd century BC. Upon the creation of the unified Georgian kingdom in the 11th century, Racha became one of the duchies (saeristavo) within it. Rati of the Baghvashi family was the first duke (eristavi) appointed by King Bagrat III. Descendants of Rati and his son Kakhaber, eponymous father of Racha's ruling dynasty of Kakhaberisdze, governed the province until 1278. In 1278 King David VI Narin abolished the duchy during his war against the Mongols.

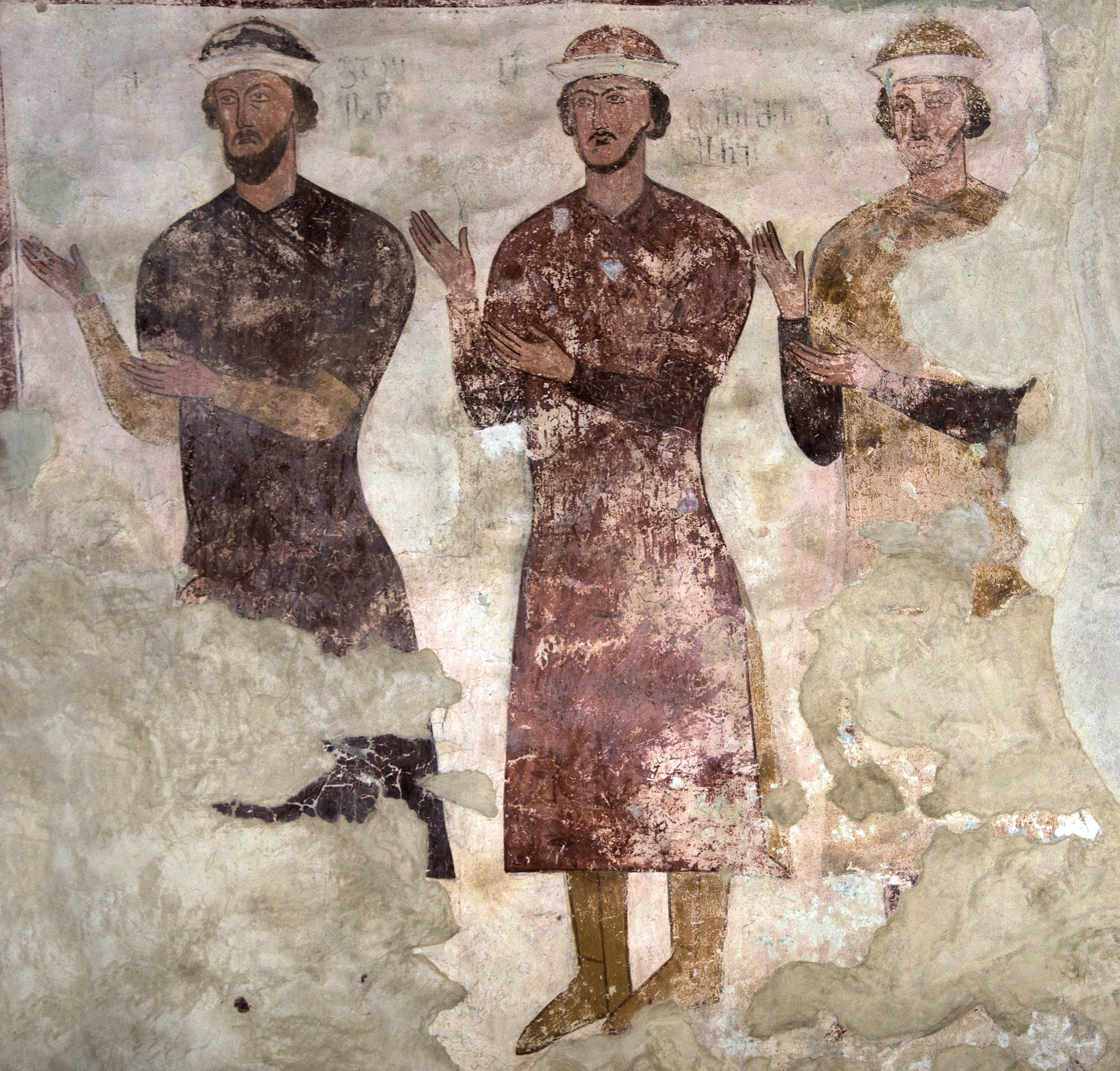
House of Charelidze, Fresco from Sori, Georgia, 14th century

In the mid-14th century, the duchy was restored under the rule of the Charelidze family.

The next dynasty of Chkhetidze governed Racha from 1465 to 1769. Vassals of the King of Imereti, they revolted several times against the royal power. The 1678–1679 civil war resulted in the most serious consequences. In this war, Duke Shoshita II of Racha (1661–1684) supported Archil II, a rival of the pro-Ottoman Imeretian king Bagrat IV. On the defeat of Archil, Racha was overrun and plundered by an Ottoman punitive force. Under Rostom (1749–1769), the duchy became virtually independent from Imereti. However, towards the end of 1769, King Solomon I of Imereti managed to arrest Rostom and to abolish the duchy. In 1784, King David II of Imereti revived the duchy and gave it to his nephew Anton. Local opposition attempted to use an Ottoman force to take control of Racha, but the victory of King David at Skhvava (January 26, 1786) temporarily secured his dominance in the area. In 1789, the next Imeretian king Solomon II finally abolished the duchy and subordinated the province directly to the royal administration.

== Demographics ==
Population Statistics for Oni and Ambrolauri Municipalities (2015–2024)
Year	Oni Total (Thousands)	Oni Urban (Thousands)	Oni Rural (Thousands)	Oni Change	Ambrolauri Total (Thousands)	Ambrolauri Urban (Thousands)	Ambrolauri Rural (Thousands)	Ambrolauri Change
2015	6.2	2.7	3.5	—	9.2	4.0	5.2	—
2016	6.1	2.7	3.4	▼−0.1 (−1.61%)	9.1	3.9	5.2	▼−0.1 (−1.09%)
2017	6.0	2.7	3.3	▼−0.1 (−1.64%)	8.9	3.8	5.1	▼−0.2 (−2.20%)
2018	5.9	2.6	3.2	▼−0.1 (−1.67%)	8.9	3.7	5.2	+0.0 (+0.00%)
2019	5.8	2.6	3.2	▼−0.1 (−1.69%)	8.8	3.7	5.1	▼−0.1 (−1.12%)
2020	5.7	2.6	3.1	▼−0.1 (−1.72%)	8.7	3.6	5.1	▼−0.1 (−1.14%)
2021	5.6	2.5	3.1	▼−0.1 (−1.75%)	8.6	3.5	5.1	▼−0.1 (−1.15%)
2022	5.5	2.5	3.0	▼−0.1 (−1.79%)	8.5	3.4	5.1	▼−0.1 (−1.16%)
2023	5.4	2.4	3.0	▼−0.1 (−1.82%)	8.4	3.3	5.1	▼−0.1 (−1.18%)
2024	5.3	2.4	2.9	▼−0.1 (−1.85%)	8.3	3.3	5.0	▼−0.1 (−1.19%)

== Genetics ==
Out of the tested Rachian last names, the most common Y-chromosomal haplogroup among the Rachians is G2a (64%), in the second place is the Y-chromosomal haplogroup J2a (22%).

== Notable people ==
- Prokofy Dzhaparidze (Alyosha), a communist revolutionary and one of the 26 Baku Commissars.
- Nona Gaprindashvili - is a Georgian chess Grandmaster. She was the first woman ever to be awarded the FIDE title of Grandmaster.
- David Gobejishvili - is a former Soviet (Georgian) wrestler and Olympic champion in Freestyle wrestling.
- Kosta Maisuradze - Soviet wrestler
- Ketevan Svanidze, first wife of Joseph Stalin
- Alexander Svanidze, Stalin's brother-in-law; executed in 1941
- Shota Kavlashvili - famous Georgian architect and historic preservationist

== See also ==
- Rachuli ham
- Rachvelians
- Racha-Lechkhumi and Kvemo Svaneti, region in Georgia
- Lechkhumi
- Nikortsminda
- Barakoni
- 1991 Racha earthquake
- Gebi
- Shovi
- Tsikari khonchiori
