= Domentius III of Georgia =

Domentius III
- His Holiness and Beatitude, Catholicos-Patriarch
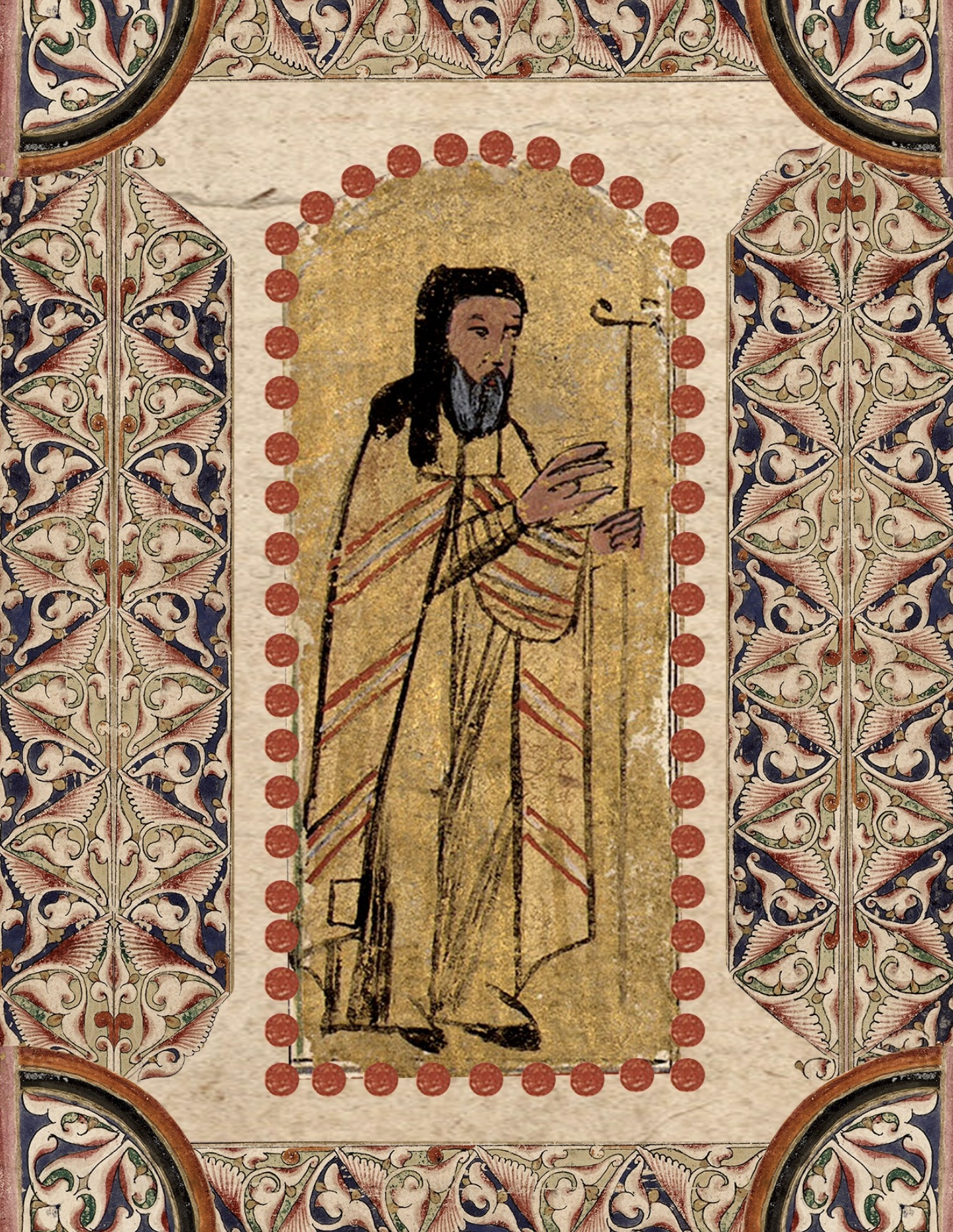
- Church: Georgian Orthodox Church
- Installed: 1660
- Term ended: 1676

Personal details
- Born: Domentius Bagrationi
- Died: 22 September 1676
- Denomination: Eastern Orthodox Church
- Parents: Kaikhosro, Prince of Mukhrani
- Occupation: Catholicos-Patriarch
- Profession: Theologian
- Khelrtva

Domentius III (Georgian: დომენტი III, Domenti III; died 22 September 1676) was a Georgian churchman and the Catholicos Patriarch of Georgia from 1660 to 1676. He was a member of the princely Mukhrani branch of the Bagrationi dynasty, born as a younger son of Kaikhosro, Prince of Mukhrani. His regnal name is sometimes given as Domentius II.

Domentius was a son of Kaikhosro, Prince of Mukhrani, born sometime before 1629. In 1649, he was ordained as an archbishop of Samtavro. In 1660, he succeeded to the patriarchal throne on the death of Christophorus II with the approval of his reigning Muslim cousin, Vakhtang V (Shah Nawaz Khan). Domentius was a supporter of Vakhtang's policy aimed at enhancing central authority at the expense of self-minded nobility, but he energetically opposed the Iranian customs prevailing at the royal court of that time. Domentius' authority extended only to eastern Georgia, with the western Georgian church running its own affairs as a result of the past political and ecclesiastic fragmentation. Immediately following his accession, Domentius embarked on a program of reorganizing perishes, building new churches, such as in Mchadijvari, and restoring older ones, such as Anchiskhati in Tbilisi, to which he attached a bell tower. He was also responsible for acquiring the venerated icon of the Savior brought from the defunct Ancha monastery to Tbilisi and earning new land estates for the Patriarchal Cathedral of Mtskheta. Domentius' reforms were supported by Vakhtang's wife Queen Mariam, a devout Christian.

Eastern Orthodox Church titles
Preceded by Christophorus II	Catholicos-Patriarch of Georgia; 1660–1676	Succeeded by Nicholas VII
