= Baazov =

Baazov is a surname. Notable people with the surname include:

- Gerzel Baazov (1904–1938), Georgian-Jewish poet and playwright
- David Baazov (1883–1947), Georgian-Jewish Zionist leader and rabbi
