= Oni Synagogue =

Synagogue in Oni, in the Republic of Georgia

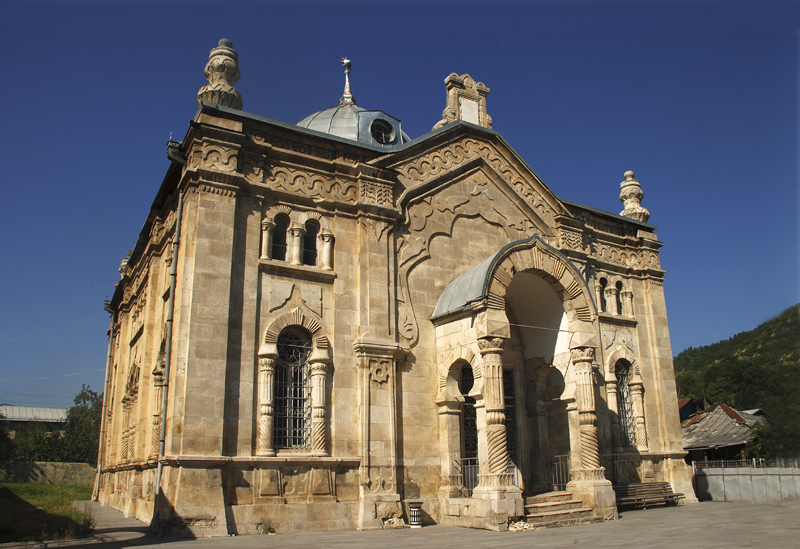
- The synagogue in 2007

- Location of the synagogue in Georgia

Religion
- Affiliation: Judaism
- Rite: Georgian Jewish
- Ecclesiastical or organizational status: Synagogue
- Status: Active

Location
- Location: 53 Vakhtang VI Street, Oni, Racha
- Country: Georgia
- Interactive map of Oni Synagogue
- Coordinates: 42°35′N 43°27′E

Architecture
- Type: Synagogue architecture
- Style: Eclecticism; Moorish Revival
- Established: c. 1801
- Completed: 1895
- Materials: Stone

The Oni Synagogue is a synagogue, located at 53 Vakhtang VI Street in Oni, in the Racha region of Republic of Georgia. The Oni synagogue was built in 1895 and is the oldest functioning synagogue in Georgia.

== History ==
The synagogue was built in 1895 in an eclectic Moorish Revival style. It is Georgia's third largest synagogue after the Great Synagoge of Tbilisi and the Synagogue of Kutaisi.

During the 1991 Racha earthquake, the synagogue was severely damaged. Four years later, the synagogue was renovated with support from the government and the American Jewish Joint Distribution Committee. The president of Georgia at the time, Eduard Shevardnadze, attended the re-dedication ceremony.

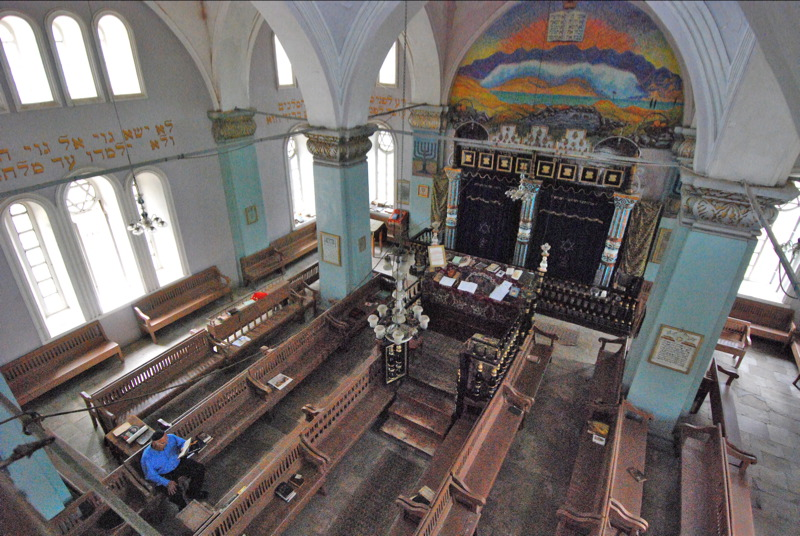
Interior of the Oni Synagogue

On September 2, 2015, the congregation celebrated the 120th anniversary of the synagogue's establishment. Irakli Garibashvili, the Prime Minister at the time, attended the ceremony.

Georgia had 250,000 Jews who belonged to an ancient community spanning thousands of years. The community had endemic customs including special prayer styles. In the 1970s and 1990s, the majority of the Jewish population moved, primarily to Israel, and only a few thousand remained in Georgia. In 1972, the synagogue had 3,150 congregants and as of 2015 the number of congregants was 16.

== Notable members ==
- Rabbi David Baazov, leading Zionist
- Gerzel Baazov, writer, activist, and son of Rabbi Baazov

== See also ==
- History of the Jews in Georgia
