= Ancha icon =

Georgian encaustic icon

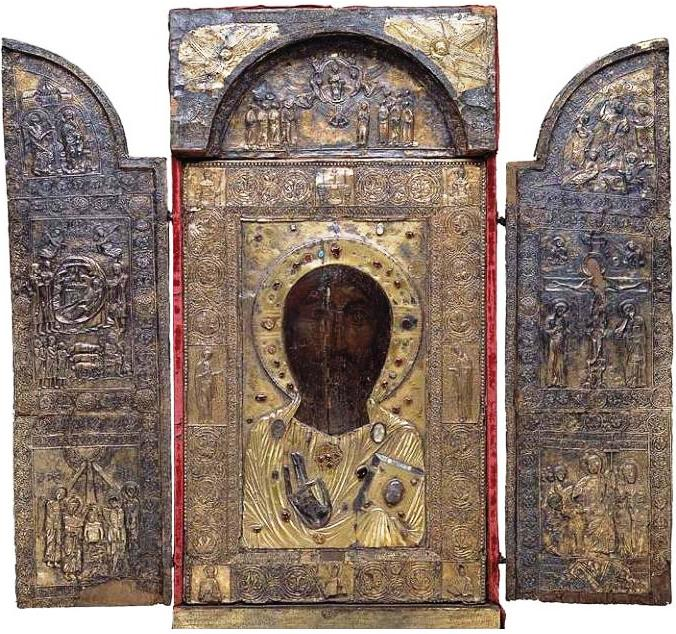
Ancha Icon of the Savior (Art Museum of Georgia, Tbilisi)

The Ancha Icon of the Savior, known in Georgia as Anchiskhati (Georgian: ანჩისხატი), is a medieval Georgian encaustic icon, traditionally considered to be the Keramidion, a "holy tile" imprinted with the face of Jesus Christ miraculously transferred by contact with the Image of Edessa (Mandylion). Dated to the 6th-7th century, it was covered with a chased silver riza and partly repainted in the following centuries. The icon derives its name from the Georgian monastery of Ancha in what is now Turkey, whence it was brought to Tbilisi in 1664. The icon is now kept at the National Art Museum of Georgia in Tbilisi.

== History ==
Medieval Georgian sources identify the Ancha icon with the Keramidion, a "holy tile" imprinted with the face of Christ miraculously transferred by contact with the Mandylion. According to the Georgian hymnist Ioann, bishop of Ancha (fl. 1195), the icon was brought in Georgia by Apostle Andrew from Hierapolis. An 18th-century inscription on the icon covering associates the Anchiskhati with the Image of Edessa, an "icon not made by hand", brought to the cathedral of Ancha in the Georgian princedom of Klarjeti to preserve it from the iconoclastic campaign by the Byzantine emperor Leo III the Isaurian.

After the Ottoman conquest of the Georgian Principality of Samtskhe, of which Klarjeti was part, in the 16th century, Christianity went in decline in the area. In 1664, the merchant Amirjan Ievangulishvili brought the icon of Ancha to Tbilisi, where it was acquired by the Georgian catholicos Domenti III for 2,000 silver coins for the newly refurbished church of the Nativity of the Theotokos in Tbilisi, henceforth known as the Anchiskhati church. The icon remained one of the most venerated relics of Georgian Christianity until after the Soviet takeover of Georgia it was moved to the National Art Museum of Georgia in the 1920s. The Anchiskhati church was closed down and would only be reopened in the last years of the Soviet Union in the 1980s. Since then, there have been repeated calls from the Orthodox Christians to return the icon to the church’s property.

== Description ==
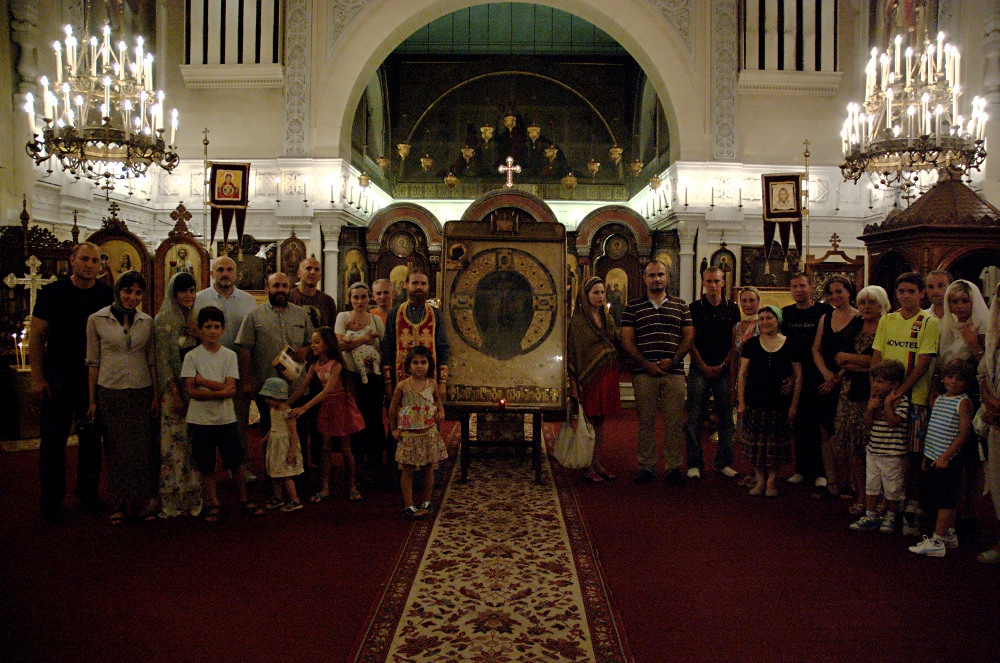
A copy of the Ancha icon at the Eastern Orthodox Church in Cannes in 2010.

Ancha Icon of the Savior is an encaustic icon dated to the 6th-7th century as it was identified by the detailed analysis by art historian Shalva Amiranashvili in the 1920s. By the end of the 12th century the icon was covered with gilded chasing by the Georgian master Beka Opizari at the behest of the bishop of Ancha, Ioann Rkinaeli, and the queen Tamar of Georgia. In the early 14th century, the icon was converted into a triptych at the expense of the Jaqeli princes of Samtskhe. The chasing was amended several times and embellished with various inscriptions that date to the 12th, 14th, 16th, and 18th centuries. The 14th and 17th-century chasing of the lateral leaves depicts 12 scenes from the New Testament, from the Annunciation to the Ascension of Jesus.

The icon (105X71X4.6 cm without a kiot, an icon box) is enclosed into the middle panel of the triptych so that only the face of the Savior remains visible. The silver chasing, remodeled in 1825, presents Christ Pantocrator, while the original encaustic painting shows the bust of Jesus. The frame of the central panel is adorned with Beka Opizari's work, a high point of the medieval Georgian art. The two symmetrically located standing figures of John the Baptist and Mary, combined with the icon of Jesus, creates the scene of deesis. The archangels Michael and Gabriel and the apostles Peter and John can be seen in the corners of the frame.
