= David Baazov Museum of History of Jews of Georgia =

Principal museum of the Jewish history and culture in Tbilisi, Georgia

The David Baazov Museum of History of Jews of Georgia (Georgian: საქართველოს ებრაელთა ისტორიის მუზეუმი, romanized: Sakartvelos Ebraelta Ist'oriis Muzeumi) is a principal museum of the Jewish history and culture in Tbilisi, Georgia. It was established by the decision of Administration of the "Georgian Committee for assisting the Poor" (established in 1928) on November 30, 1932, as a departmental organization within the framework of cultural base of Jewish workers; it was officially founded by the order of People's Commissariat of Education of Georgia on November 23, 1933, under the title 'Jewish Historic-Ethnographic Museum'.

== History ==
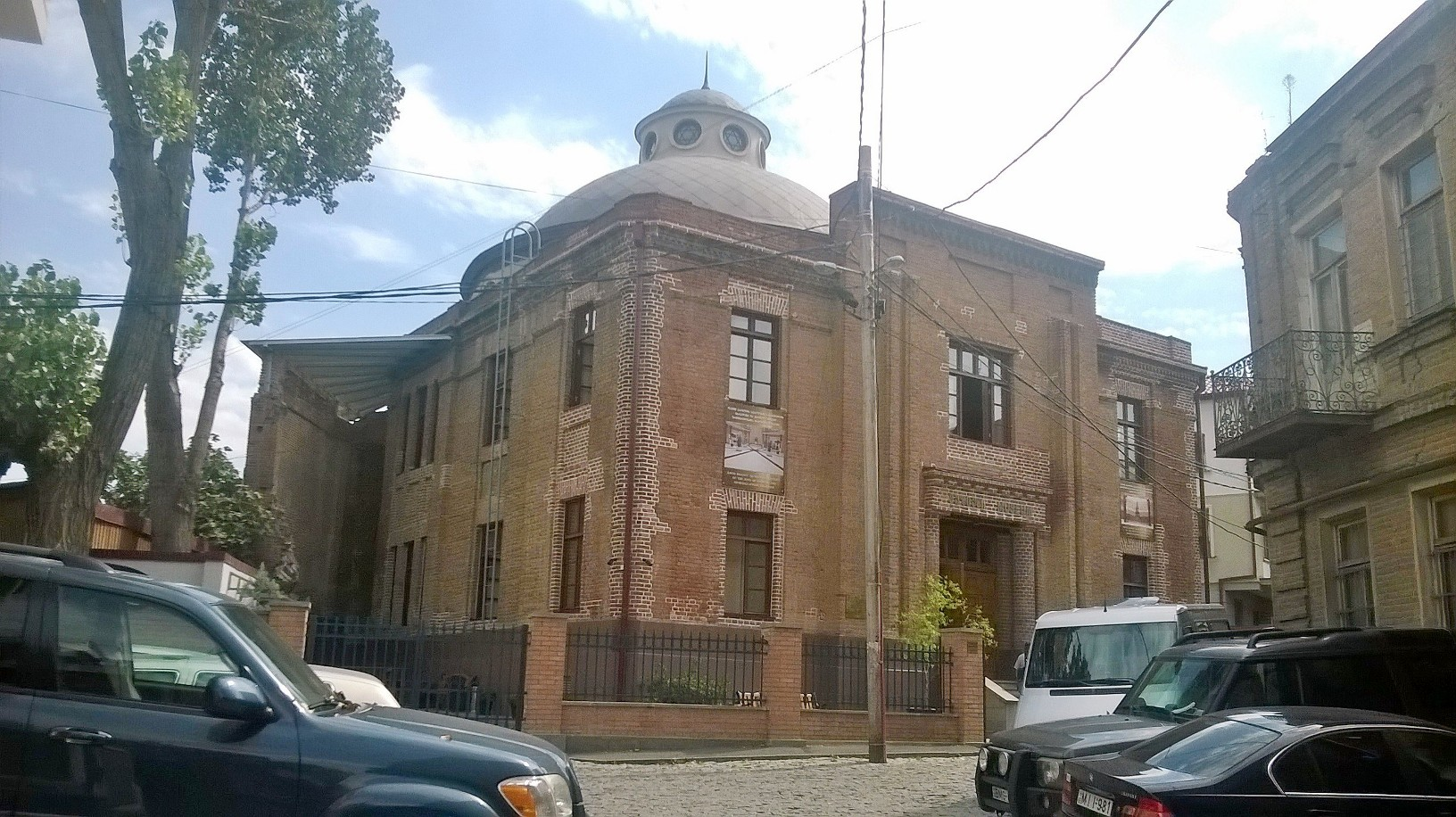
The Museum of History of the Jews of Georgia

At first, the museum was located in the building of the Jewish cultural centre (presently at 10, Abesadze St) and from 1940, in the so-called Dome-shaped Synagogue (presently at 3, Anton Cathalicos St). >

The museum building was constructed in the early 20th century; it is built of brick; polygonal from the outside and circular inside (with 3 apses), with two (big and little) domes mounted on 8 coupled reinforced-concrete pillars located along the perimeter; as a result of reconstruction the building has become three-storied, approximately 20 metres long and wide and 21 metres high.

The museum was closed in 1951, during a period of antisemitic actions in the USSR. Museum was recommenced by the decision No. 1017 of the Government of Georgia of 30 November 1992 based on the submission of the Association for Georgian-Jewish Relations of the Georgian Academy of Sciences and named after David Baazov, the famous rabbi and public figure. The museum was put under the aegis of the Ministry of Culture of Georgia; the Georgian Academy of Sciences was entrusted with its scientific management; in 2000–2004, the museum was placed under the Ministry of Culture of Georgia and Tbilisi City Administration For the purpose of preservation of the important historical building (which was in a poor condition), and of the museum, which was of national and international importance, special measures were worked out to ensure functioning and reconstruction of the museum as a treasure-house of the centuries-old history of Jewish life in Georgia, and as a unique scientific center studying Georgian-Jewish relations. This followed the appeal of the Association for Georgian-Jewish Relations, and was carried out according to order No.654 of the president of Georgia of 25 July 2004 `Concerning arrangements for restoration-reconstruction of David Baazov Historical and Ethnographical Museum of Jews of Georgia`.

According to the decree of the president of Georgia No. 493 of 16 August 2006, a new legal status of the museum was established as well as its name: `David Baazov Museum of History of the Jews of Georgia`. The Ministry of Culture, Monuments Protection and Sport of Georgia was charged with carrying out its governmental control. The museum possesses many exhibits, epigraphic, manuscript, archaeological, ethnographic, historical and art rarities, the archives, etc. which, after the abolishment of the museum in 1951, were placed in various museums, institutes and depositories.

The return of materials belonging to the museum was stipulated by order No.654 of the president of Georgia of 2004, along with the completion of building reconstruction. "Hebraic studies" – volume 5 of an important series (I-1940, II-1941, III-1945, IV-2006, V-2008) was published; expeditions to various regions of Georgia were carried out, exhibitions arranged; international conferences on the issues of the Georgian Jews, and on the history of Georgian-Palestinian and Georgian-Jewish relations, were held.

== Expositional conception ==
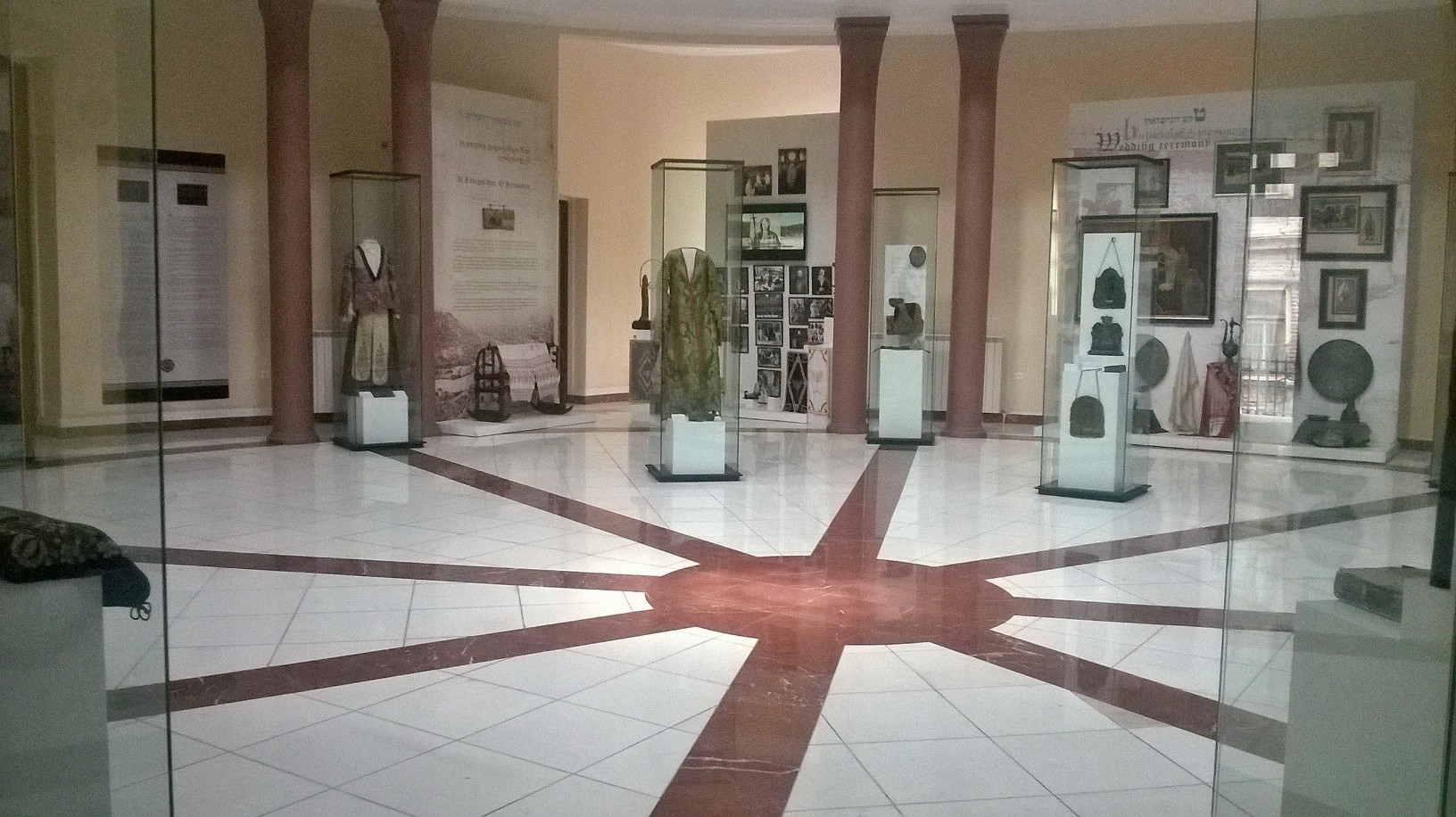
Museum of History of the Jews of Georgia, exposition

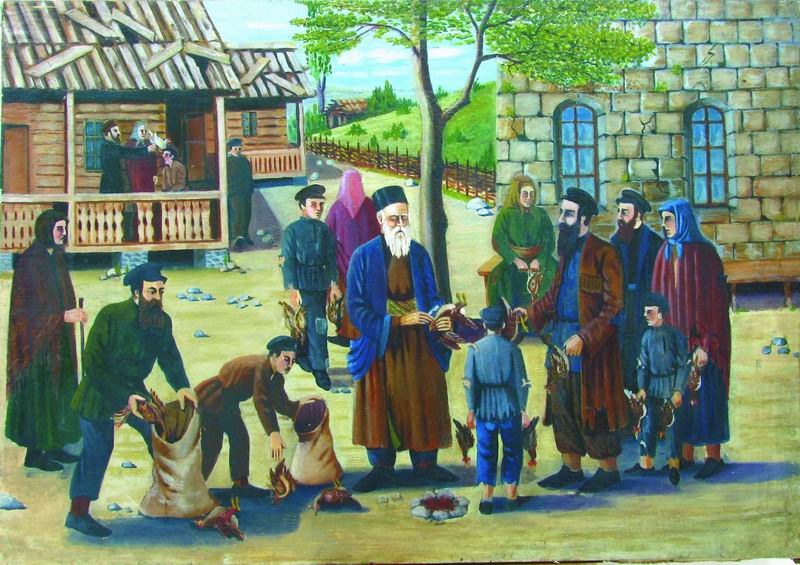
Shalom Koboshvili, Slaughtering poultry according to religious rules (1940)

The history of Georgia exemplifies the centuries-old peaceful interrelation of two ancient nations, Georgian and Jewish; and this relationship, against a background of history of the Jews of Georgia, is one of the main features of the exhibition.

On the basis of biblical, archaeological, historical and linguistic data, the following issues are covered by the exhibition:

- Georgia (the Caucasus)-Palestine historical and cultural relations (the Stone Age, the Bronze Age, antique period, the Middle Ages) that is explained by the existence of a common historical and cultural area;
- Various periods of the Jews' arrival, settling and rooting in Georgia: the 8th century BC (Shalmaneser V), the 6th century BC (after 586, Nebuchadnezzar II), the 2nd–1st centuries BC, the 19th–20th centuries;
- The phenomenon of the Jews of Georgia (anthropological, ethnic, social, juridical, religious, cultural, ethnographic, etc. aspects);
- The contribution of Georgian Jews to public, economic, cultural, and scientific fields in Georgia;
- The role of Georgian Jews in the dissemination of Christianity within Georgia;
- Monuments of Georgian spiritual and material culture in `The Holy Land`;
- Isotheistic theory concerning the origin of Georgian kings (according to which Georgian kings – the Bagrationis were said to be descendants of the biblical Jewish kings David, Solomon and Joseph, husband of the Mother of God, and by this line connected with the Lord)
- Symbols related to the biblical King David (e.g. the hexagram, the Bagrationis' coat of arms) in medieval Georgian material culture;
- Monuments of the Georgian Jews spiritual and material culture, their religious life and traditions;
- The Georgian Jews' way of life and culture;
- The absence of antisemitism on the part of government in the history of Georgia. There are mentioned selflessness and self-sacrifice of the Georgians who were saving the Jews in the beginning of the 20th century when anti-Semitic pogroms took place in Russia, and the Jewish captives during World War II;
- Periods of the Jews' return from Georgia to their historically native land (and other countries of the world): the 19th century – beginning of the 20th century, from the 1970s Metaphysical, historical, social and political aspects of this phenomenon are explained; considerable facts of the Georgian Jews' attitude towards Georgia as their `second native land`, as well as present-day Georgia-Israel governmental, scientific, cultural and social interrelation are examined;
- Jewish, Georgian-Jewish governmental and public organizations functioning in Georgia;
- There will be different photographs, textual, subject materials presented in the exhibition: maps, landscapes, districts of the Jews' historical settlement in Georgia, views of the religious buildings and cemeteries, demographic data, rich historical, archaeological, ethnographic, epigraphic, hand-written and printed materials, works by the Georgian Jewish `primitivist` Shalom Koboshvili, the Jewish artist Solomon Gershov, and other painters.

The leitmotif of the exhibition is as follows: the Georgian Jews have maintained a centuries-old way of life in Georgia and are also firmly rooted in its history, and this is a clear manifestation of the two nations' tolerance. Georgia has given the world a demonstration of the nations' peaceful co-existence.

== Literature ==
- State Historical and Ethnographical Museum of Jews of Georgia, `Tbilisi`, Encyclopaedia, Tbilisi, 2002 (in Georgian).
- A.Gegechkori, Ashkenazi synagogues in Tbilisi, `Menora-10`, Tbilisi, 2003 (in Georgian).
- G.Chanishvili, The building of David Baazov Historical and Ethnographical Museum of Jews of Georgia, Tbilisi, 2003 (in Georgian).
- G.Gambashidze, David Baazov Historical and Ethnographical Museum of [Jews of Georgia: history and future prospects. International scientific conference dedicated to David Baazov's 120th and Gerzel Baazov's 100th anniversaries, Jerusalem, 2005 (in Georgian).
- Sh.Tsitsuashvili, Historical and Ethnographical Museum of Georgian Jews (1933-1951). `Works` of D.Baazov Historical and Ethnographical Museum of Jews of Georgia, IV, Tbilisi, 2006 (in Georgian and English).
- T.Tsagareishvili, Academician Giorgi Chitaya and Historical and Ethnographical Museum of Jews of Georgia. `Works` of D.Baazov Historical and Ethnographical Museum of Jews of Georgia, IV, Tbilisi, 2006 (in Georgian and English).
- Synagogues, `Tbilisi`, Old cities of Georgia, Tbilisi, 2006 (in Georgian and English).
- Georgian museums, Guidebook, Tbilisi, 2006 (in Georgian and English).
