= Bishopric of Ancha =

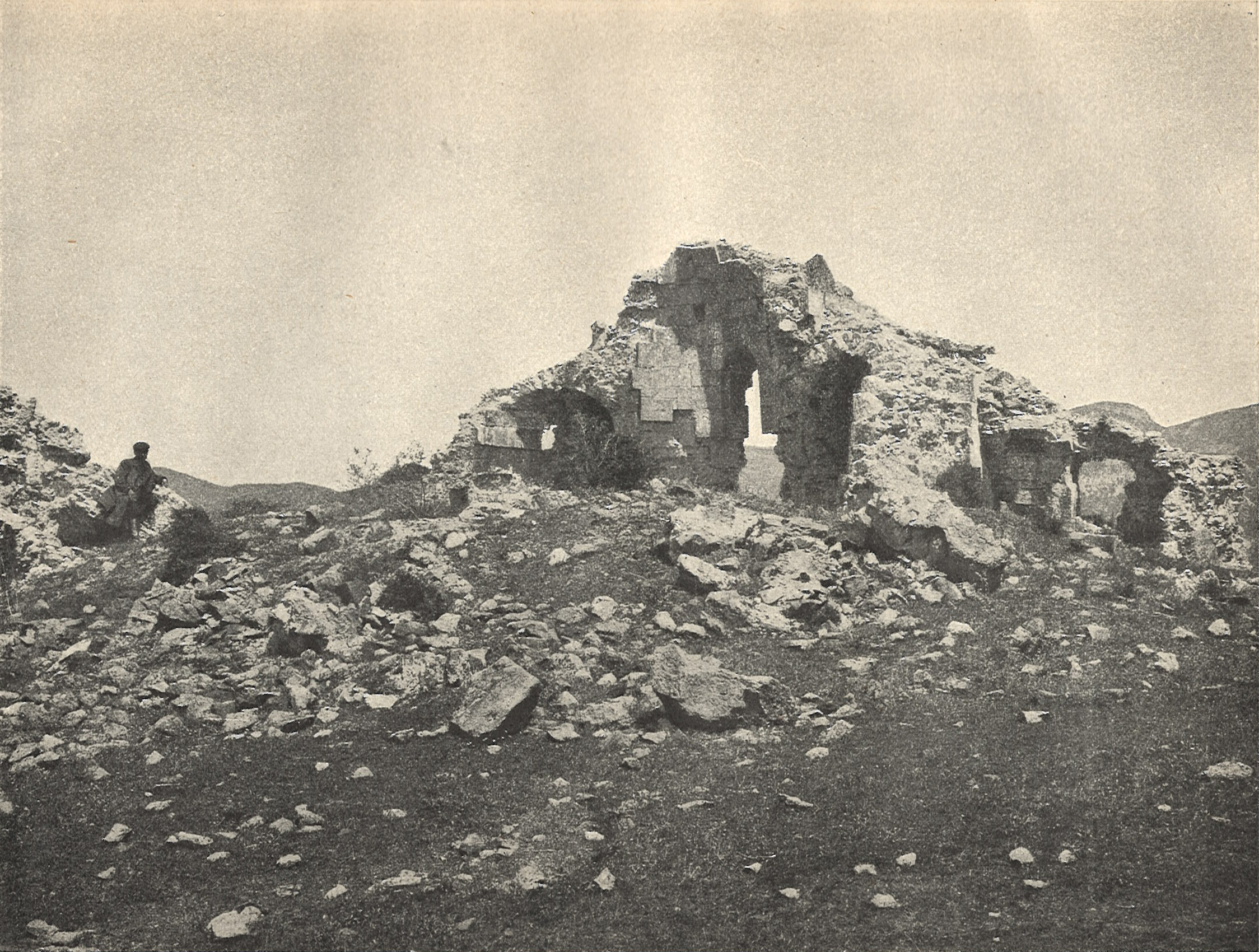
Ancha Monastery in 1903. Nicholas Marr

The Bishopric of Ancha (Georgian: ანჩის საეპისკოპოსო, anchis saepiskoposo) was one of the principal territorial jurisdictions of the medieval Georgian Orthodox Church in the province of Klarjeti (now part of Turkey), with its cathedral church at Ancha (modern Anaçlı, Ardanuç). It came in existence between the 7th and 9th centuries and had disappeared by the middle of the 17th century after the Ottoman conquest of the area. The bishopric was a vibrant center of Georgian Christian culture and played a role in the regional politics. The cathedral of Ancha housed a celebrated gilded icon of the Savior, which was transferred, in 1664, to the Georgian capital of Tbilisi, in a church henceforth known as Anchiskhati, "the icon of Ancha".

== Role in church and culture ==
Ancha's diocesan territory covered much of Klarjeti, including the Artanuji area, the entirety of the Nigali valley and extended up to Gonio in what is now Adjara, Georgia. The bishopric’s rise in prominence was closely related to the activities of the Twelve Lavras of Klarjeti, supervised by the archimandrite Gregory of Khandzta (759 –861), and later taken over by the bishop of Ancha himself. As of the 14th century, the bishop of Ancha – titled as Ancheli – ranked as the 3rd, after the bishops of Ishkhani and Atskuri, in the ecclesiastic hierarchy of the Principality of Samtskhe and as the 11th, between the bishops of Ishkhani and Tbeti, in the hierarchy of the kingdom of Georgia.

== Political history ==
The hierarchs of Ancha played a prominent role in the regional politics. Thus, the 9th-century Tskiri, succeeding the first known bishop of Ancha Zachary, is known from the Vitae of St. Gregory of Khandzta to have been installed with the help of the Arab emir of Tbilisi and, hence, overwhelmingly opposed and excommunicated by the Georgian monks of Klarjeti. In 1028, the bishop of Ancha and hymnist Ezra was among the fewest of the nobles of Tao-Klarjeti who maintained loyalty to the Georgian king Bagrat IV, whose realm was threatened by an invasion from the neighboring Byzantine Empire. Later, during the twilight of the Georgian monarchy, the bishop Joseph of Ancha was allied with Prince Ioann of Samtskhe (r. 1391–1444) in his efforts to detach Samtskhe, both politically and ecclesiastically, from the rest of Georgia. The bishops of Ancha were intermittently able to break free of the Georgian catholicoi at Mtskheta and were ordained by the bishops of Atskuri, who, in their turn, were invested directly by the Patriarch of Antioch. However, a document from the latter half of the 15th century – in which the bishop Kerobin Abelisdze takes an oath of fealty to the Georgian catholicos David IV – testifies to the return of the bishopric of Ancha to the allegiance of the see of Mtskheta. In 1551, the Ottomans invaded Samtskhe and Christianity went in gradual decline in the region. By the mid-17th century, the bishopric of Ancha had ceased to exist. Part of Christian relics kept there were evacuated to the safer areas of Georgia.

== Known bishops ==
- Zachary (9th century)
- Tskiri (9th century)
- Makarios (fl. 861)
- Ioann (fl. 1195)
- Theophanes (1350s-60s)
- Joseph (14th-15th centuries)
- Kerobin (15th century)
