= Itska Rizhinashvili =

Abram "Itska" Rizhinashvili (Georgian: იცკა რიჟინაშვილი; April 12, 1886 – July 17, 1906) was a Georgian Jew from Kutaisi (then part of the Russian Empire. He studied at the Kutaisi Real Gymnasium and became involved in the social-democratic movement. While studying at the Leipzig University, he joined a local Bolshevik group in 1904. Back to Georgia in 1905, he helped propagate Marxist ideas among the army soldiers stationed in Imereti and Samegrelo. He was assassinated by a Tsarist police agent in Kutaisi; Rizhinashvili was 20 years of age.

His story is described in a 1936 play by the Georgian Jewish writer Gerzel Baazov.
