= Mayer Kirshenblatt =

Polish-born Canadian painter and author of Jewish origin

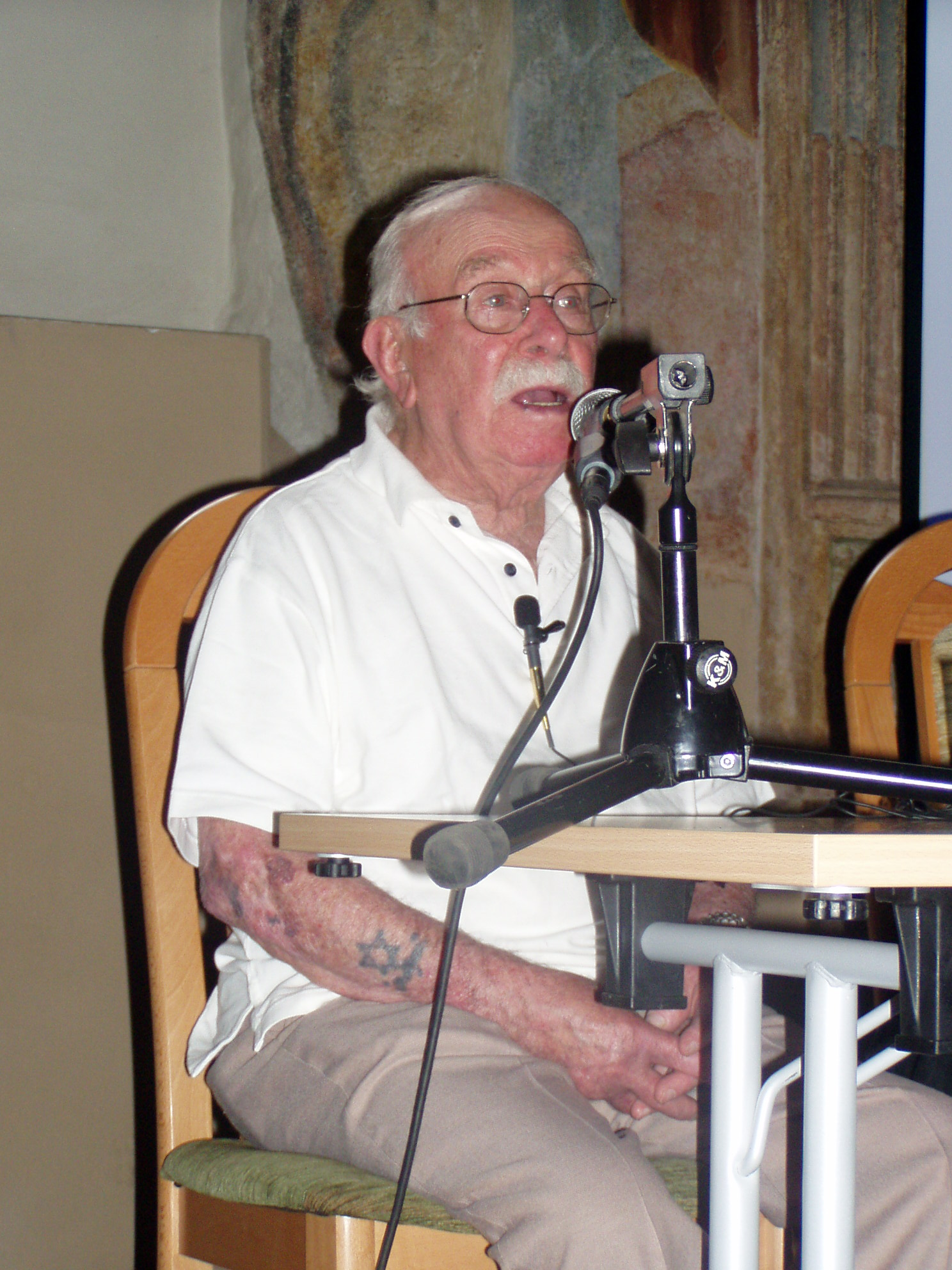
- Born: September 4, 1916; Opatów
- Died: November 20, 2009 (aged 93); Toronto, Canada
- Known for: painting

Mayer Kirshenblatt (1916–2009) was a Polish-born Canadian self-taught painter and author of Jewish origin.

== Biography ==
Mayer Kirshenblatt was born on September 4, 1916, in Opatów (Apt in Yiddish), to a middle class Jewish family. He attended a cheder and a Polish public school. He left Poland in 1934 and settled in Toronto, Canada, where he eventually ran a paint and wallpaper store for many years.

In 1967, his daughter Barbara Kirshenblatt-Gimblett began interviewing Mayer about his childhood. In 1990, at the urging of his wife, daughter, and son-in-law Max Gimblett, Mayer began to paint. He created around 300 paintings mostly depicting the Opatów of his childhood. In minute detail Kirshenblatt painted people at work, everyday chores, as well as Jewish and Christian holiday celebrations. His work was first shown in Toronto, then at the Judah L. Magnes Museum, Geodesy and Cartography Museum in Opatów, The Jewish Museum (New York City), Galicia Jewish Museum (Kraków), Yiddish Book Center (Amherst), and Joods Historisch Museum (Amsterdam).

In 2007, he and his daughter Barbara published They Called Me Mayer July: Painted Memories of a Jewish Childhood before the Holocaust (University of California Press). The book won the Canadian Jewish Book Award, J. I. Segal Book Award, and American Association of University Presses award, and was a finalist in three categories for the National Jewish Book Award.

Kirshenblatt died on November 20, 2009, in Toronto.

== See also ==
- Shalom Koboshvili

== Bibliography ==
- Kirshenblatt, Mayer and Barbara Kirshenblatt-Gimblett. They Called Me Mayer July: Painted Memories of a Jewish Childhood in Poland Before the Holocaust. Berkeley: University of California Press, 2007.
