= Shalom Koboshvili =

Georgian artist

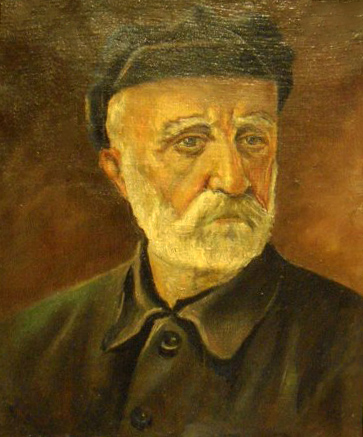
- Self-portrait, 1930s.
- Born: 1876; Akhaltsikhe, Russian Empire (now Georgia)
- Died: 1941; Tbilisi, Georgian SSR, Soviet Union (now Georgia)
- Known for: Drawings; Paintings

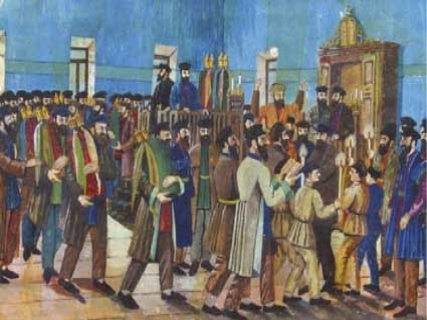
Prayers in the Synagogue

Shalom Koboshvili (Note: Hebrew: שלום קובושווילי, Georgian: შალომ კობოშვილი) (1876 – 1941) was a Georgian artist who specialised in drawings and paintings of Jewish life in Georgia. Born to a poor family of Jews in Akhaltsikhe, Koboshvili was originally intended for the Rabbinate, but quit religious training at an early age. His interest in art was discouraged by his family, and he was originally apprenticed as a printer. All his knowledge of art was effectively self-taught. After a varied career (in which around 1910 he is said to have met with the artist Niko Pirosmani) he eventually became in 1937 a watchman at the newly established Jewish Historic-Ethnographic Museum in Tbilisi. His work there apparently inspired him to devote himself to painting and all his surviving work dates from the period 1937–1941, the year of his death.

Koboshvili's work, which is all in a competent but naive style, is entirely devoted to scenes of Jewish life; sometimes painted in oils, sometimes in water colours on paper. There are scenes relating to Jewish marriages, to Jewish festivals (including Sukkot and Yom Kippur), and to scenes of Jewish life in Georgian villages and on Jewish kolkhozes.

The Georgian Jewish Museum was forcibly closed in the 1950s and its contents, including the works of Koboshvili, were transferred to the Georgian National Museum, to which they still belong. A retrospective exhibition of the works of Koboshvili was held at the Museum in Tbilisi in 2006.

== See also ==
- Mayer Kirshenblatt
