= David Baazov =

Georgian-Jewish public figure and Zionist activist (1883–1947)

- Born: 1883; Tskhinvali, Russian Empire (present day Georgia/South Ossetia)
- Died: 17 October 1947 (aged 63–64)
- Occupation: Rabbi
- Known for: Zionism in Georgia
- Children: Gerzel Baazov (son)

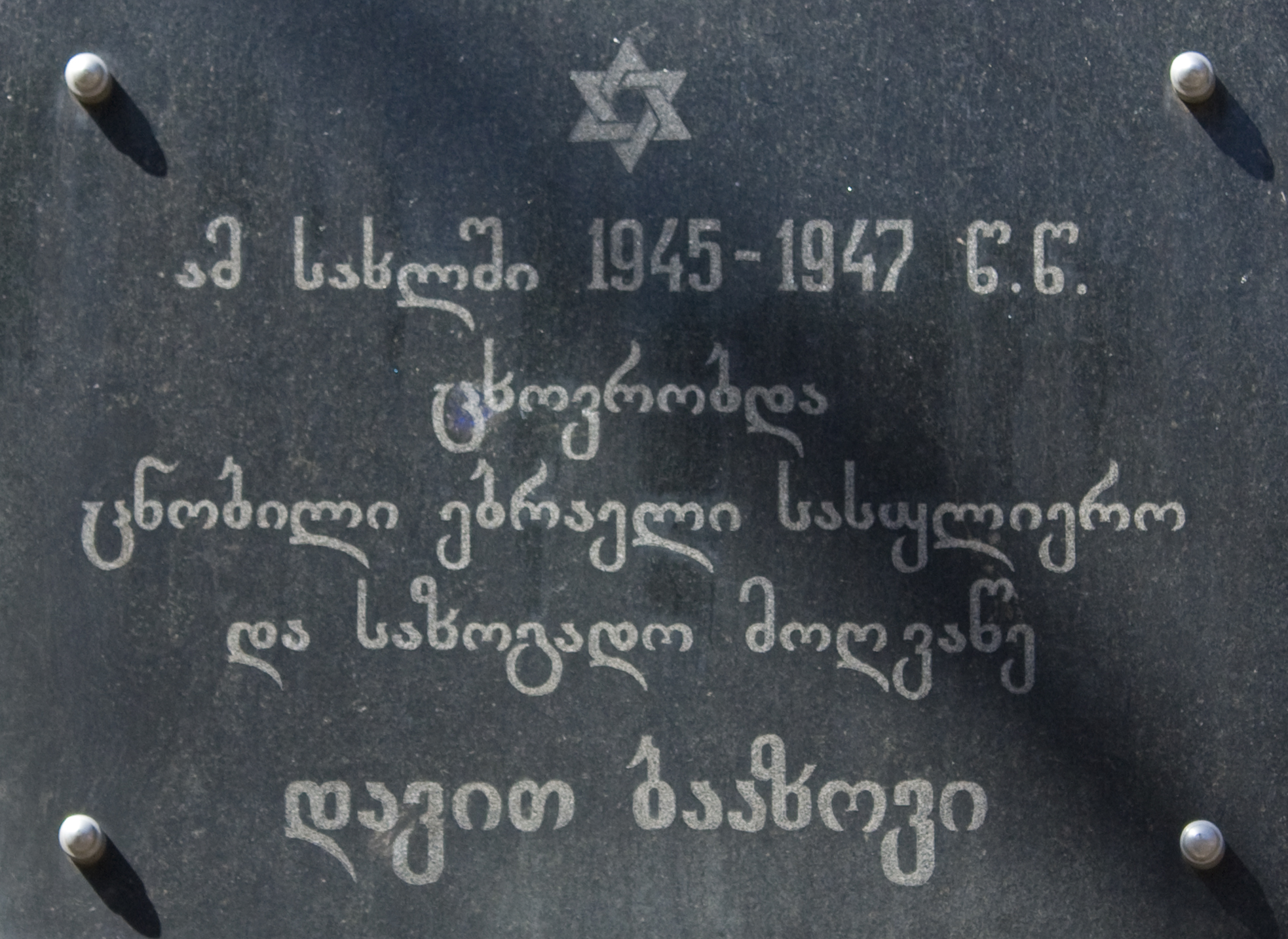
Memory desk on the house where Baazov lived. Tbilisi, Georgia

David Baazov (Georgian: დავით ბააზოვი; 1883–17 October 1947) was a Georgian-Jewish public and religious figure who spearheaded the Zionist movement in Georgia. His program was an amalgam of moderate orthodox religiosity, enlightenment, and Zionism. He was born in Tskhinvali, South Ossetia, Georgia (then part of the Russian Empire) into a family of rabbis. He was educated in Jewish philosophy and history at Slutsk and Vilnius where he became exposed to Zionist ideas.

== Biography ==
In 1903, he attended the Sixth Zionist Congress in Basel. Returning to Georgia, Baazov became a rabbi in the town of Oni and quickly emerged as a leader of Zionism in Georgia. His growing influence was opposed by a group of anti-Zionist rabbis and the so-called "assimilationist" Jewish intellectuals who put forward the thesis that the Georgian Jews were ethnic Georgians and "Israelites by religion".

In 1918, Baazov founded the first Georgian-Jewish Zionist paper Ebraelis Khma ('The Voice of Jew') and helped organize the All-Jewish Congress in Tbilisi which included representatives from every Georgian and Russian Jewish community in the country, except for Kutaisi, which had become the center of the Jewish anti-Zionism. At that time, he served as a rabbi in Akhaltsikhe and exploited his friendly ties with a local Muslim clergy to save many Christians during a brief Ottoman occupation of the area in 1918.

After the Sovietization of Georgia in 1921, Baazov, aided by his son Gerzel, organized Jewish schools across the country and later founded the magazine Makaveeli ('Maccabean'), which was closed by the Soviet authorities during a crackdown on Georgian Jewish cultural institutions after the 1924 anti-Soviet August Uprising in Georgia. Next year, he managed to secure the free passage for several Georgian Jewish families to the Land of Israel, launching the first large wave of Aliyah from Georgia.

During the Great Purge of 1938, both of his sons were arrested by the Soviet NKVD and Gerzel was executed. Soon, David Baazov was also arrested and sentenced to death for "Zionist activities". The sentence was later commuted to exile in Siberia. In 1945, he returned to the Georgian SSR and chiefly engaged in educational activities.

== Legacy ==
The main writer on David Baazov and the main collector of his works was his daughter Fanny Baazova (1912–1980). The Georgian Jews' History Museum in Tbilisi has been named after him.

== See also ==
- David Baazov Museum of History of Jews of Georgia
