= Oni, Georgia =

Oni ონი
- Town
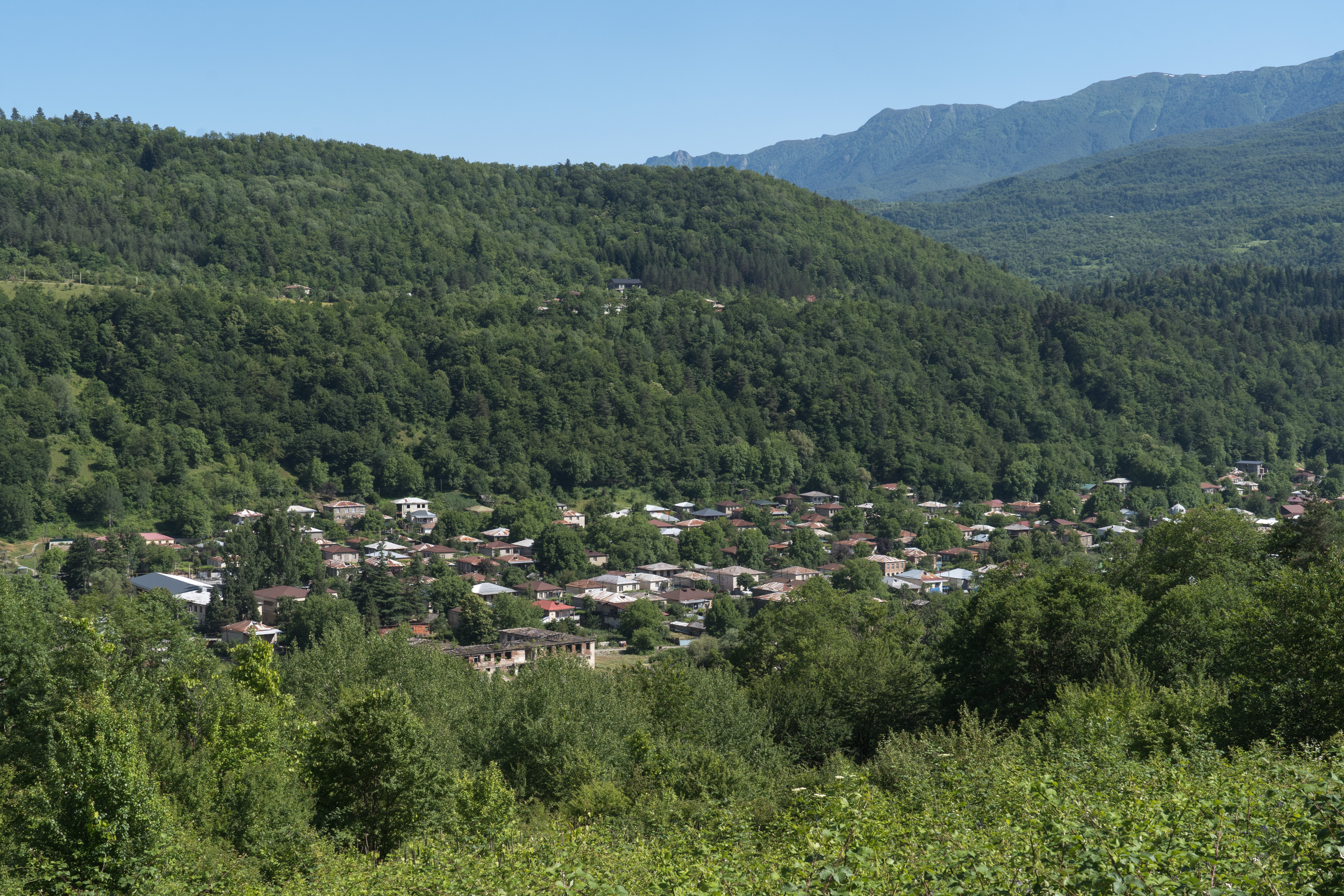
- View of Oni

- Flag Seal
- Interactive map of Oni
- Location within Racha-Lechkhumi and Kvemo Svaneti Location within Georgia
- Coordinates: 42°35′02″N 43°26′30″E
- Country: Georgia
- Region: Racha
- Municipality: Oni
- Elevation: 830 m (2,720 ft)

Population (2024)
  - Total: 2,498
- Time zone: UTC+4 (Georgian Time)

Oni (Georgian: ონი, romanized: oni [ˈo̞n̪i]) is a town in Racha-Lechkhumi and Kvemo Svaneti region (mkhare), Georgia. Historically and ethnographically, it is part of Racha, a historic highland province in western Georgia. The town also serves as an administrative center of the Oni district (raioni).

Oni is situated in a deep gorge on the left bank of Rioni River, some 830 metres (2,723 feet) above sea level and 210 kilometres (130 miles) northwest of Georgia's capital Tbilisi.

== History ==
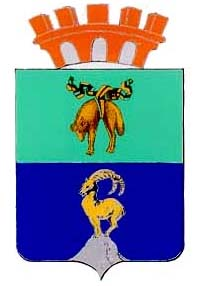
The former seal of Oni devised during the Imperial Russian rule.

The territory of modern-day Oni has been inhabited since the Bronze Age. Archaeology revealed the artifacts of Colchian culture, particularly a collection of Colchian coins dating back to the 6th–3rd centuries BC. Oni is first chronicled in the 15th century, though a legend has it that the town was founded by the 2nd BC king Pharnajom of Iberia. Located on the crossroads from Northern Caucasus, Kartli (central Georgia), Imereti (western Georgia) and Lower Rach'a, Oni developed into a typical late medieval commercial town and was contested between the kings of Imereti and the princes of Rach'a. The town was absorbed by Imperial Russia in 1810, and made it, in 1846 the administrative center of the Racha Uyezd of the Kutaisi Governorate. During the Soviet Union, the town was united with a number of surrounding villages into the Oni district, which is currently administered as a part of the Racha-Lechkhumi and Lower Svaneti region.

In recent decades Oni has suffered from earthquakes and a series of avalanches. A particularly severe earthquake occurred on 29 April 1991. The earthquake measured 7.0 on the moment magnitude scale with a maximum MSK intensity of IX (Destructive), the most powerful ever recorded in the Caucasus Mountains, and caused significant damage to the infrastructure of Oni.

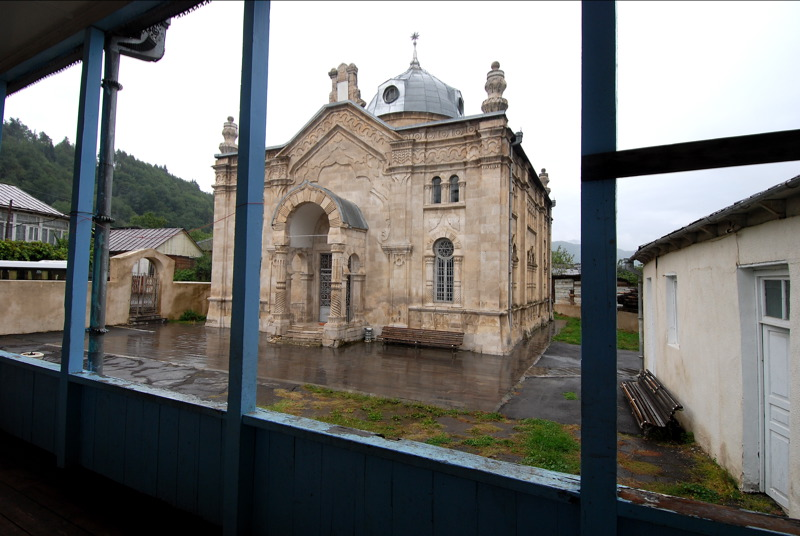
Oni Synagogue

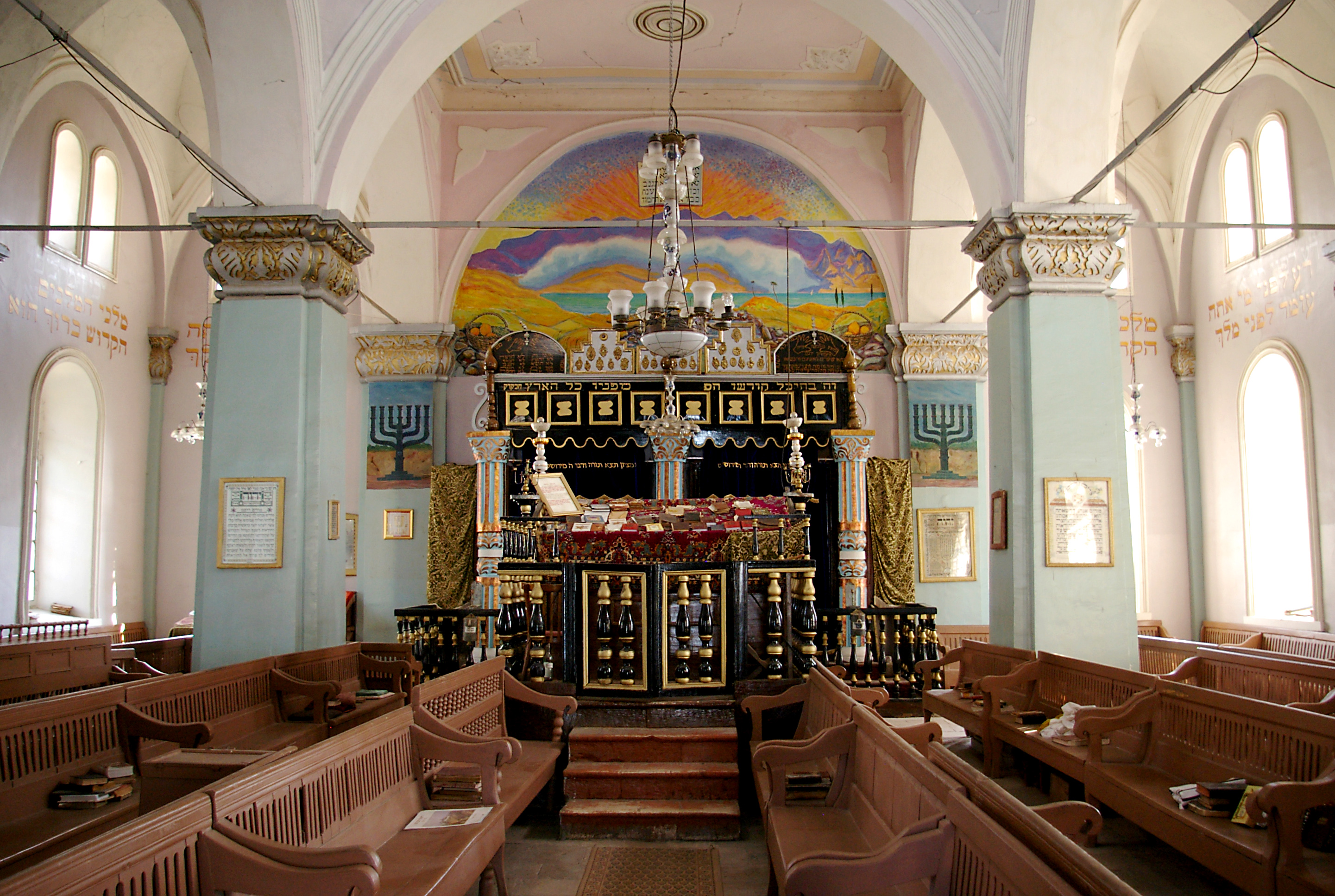
The Synagogue in Oni

Despite a post-Soviet tendency towards migration, Oni still retains a small number of Jewish families – remnants of once powerful and large historic Jewish community, Georgia's third largest, after those of Tbilisi and Kutaisi. The Oni Synagogue was built in the 1880s by a Polish architect and the builders were Greek Jews from Thessaloniki.

Oni and its environs house a number of historical monuments, including the ruins of medieval forts and Georgian Orthodox churches. A popular spa, Shovi, and Utsera are located some 15 to 30 kilometres (9 to 19 miles) from Oni, on the southern slopes of the Greater Caucasus mountains. The Racha Regional Museum, located in Oni, has an impressive collection of 14000 unique artifacts from the fields of archaeology, ethnography, numismatics, natural history, fine art, historical documents, manuscripts, and printed books.

== Demographic ==
The vast majority of the population is of Georgian origin and are Christians Orthodox. The largest ethnic minority is the Ossetian people.

There was a large community of Georgian Jews which explain the presence of the Oni Synagogue but they emigrated to Israel after the fall of USSR and only a few remain to look after the synagogue.

== International relations ==
=== Twin towns — Sister cities ===
- Beersheba, Israel.
- Kazlų Rūda, Lithuania.
- Fitchburg, Massachusetts, United States.

== Notable people from Oni ==
- Shalva Amiranashvili (1899–1975), Georgian art historian
- Gerzel Baazov (1904–1938), Georgian Jewish writer
- Dover Kosashvili, Israeli film director
