= Anchiskhati Basilica =

Church in Tbilisi, Georgia

Anchiskhati Basilica of Saint Mary ანჩისხატი (in Georgian)
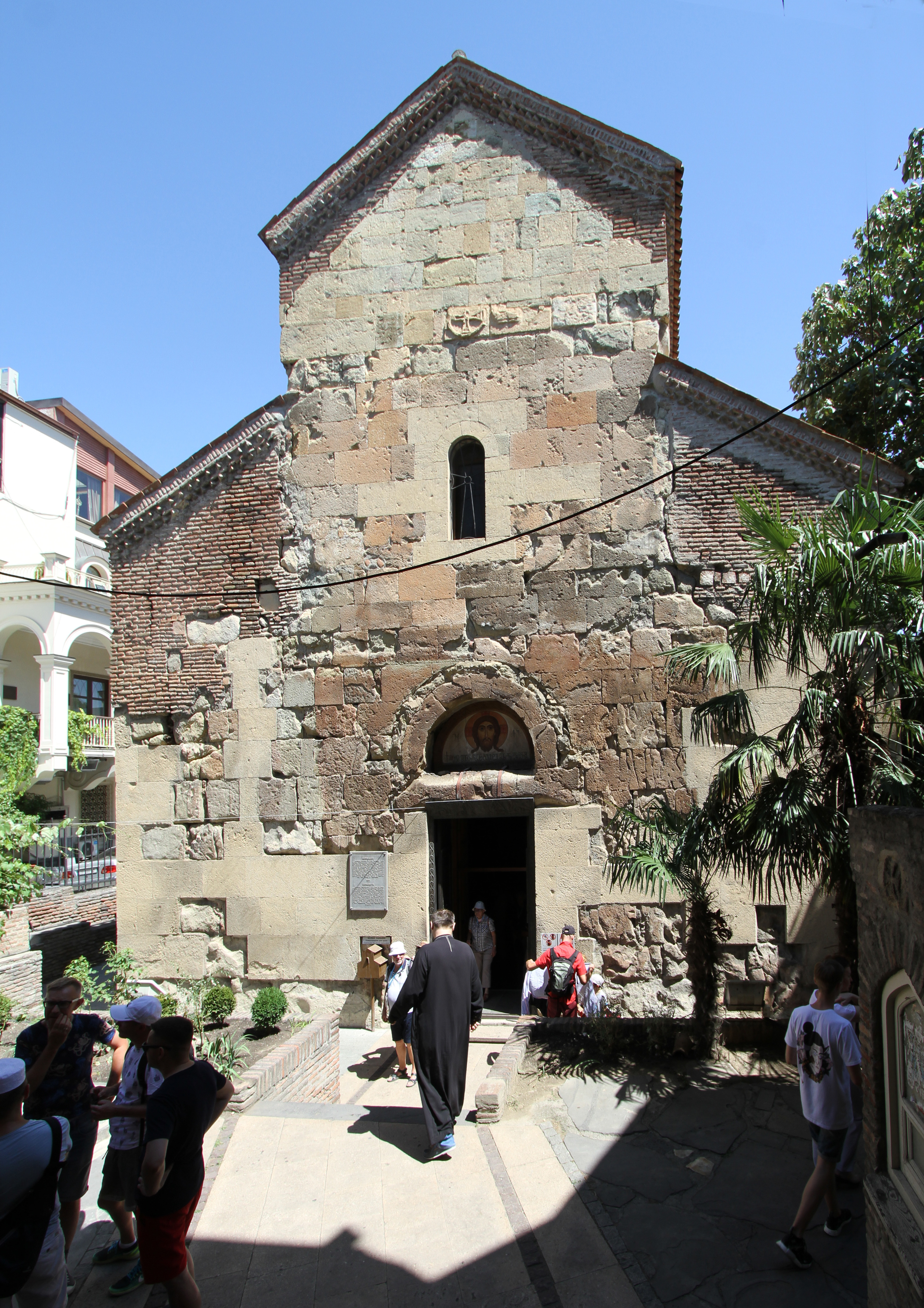
- The Anchiskhati Church as it looks today

Religion
- Affiliation: Georgian Orthodox

Location
- Location: (Georgia (country)) Tbilisi, Georgia
- Interactive map of Anchiskhati Basilica of Saint Mary ანჩისხატი (in Georgian)
- Coordinates: 41°41′44″N 44°48′25″E

Architecture
- Type: Church
- Completed: 6th century
- Cultural Heritage Monument of Georgia
- Official name: Anchiskhati
- Designated: October 1, 2007; 18 years ago
- Reference no.: 5073
- Item Number in Cultural Heritage Portal: 3914
- Date of entry in the registry: October 11, 2007; 18 years ago
- Accounting Card / Passport #: 010404007

The Anchiskhati Basilica of St Mary (Georgian: ანჩისხატი, Georgian pronunciation: [ˈantʃʰisχat’i]) is the oldest surviving church in Tbilisi, Georgia. It belongs to the Georgian Orthodox Church and dates from the sixth century.

== History ==
According to the old Georgian annals, the church was built by the King Dachi of Iberia (circa 522-534) who had made Tbilisi his capital. Originally dedicated to the Virgin Mary, it was renamed Anchiskhati (i.e., icon of Ancha) in 1675 when the treasured icon of the Savior created by the twelfth-century goldsmith Beka Opizari at the Ancha monastery in Klarjeti (in what is now part of northeast Turkey) was moved to Tbilisi to preserve it from an Ottoman invasion. The icon was preserved at the Basilica of St Mary for centuries (it is now on display at the Art Museum of Georgia).

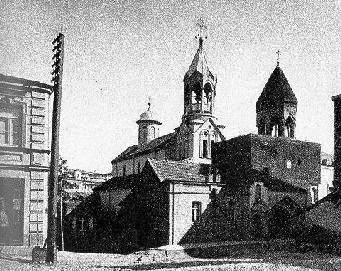
The Anchiskhati Church, 1890

The basilica was damaged and rebuilt on several occasions from the 15th through 17th centuries due to wars between Georgia and the Persians and Turks. The brick belfry near the Anchiskhati Basilica was built by Catholicos Domenti in 1675.

The look of the structure was drastically changed in the 1870s when a dome was added. During the Soviet period, all religious ceremonies at Anchiskhati Basilica were halted, and the building transformed into a museum for handicrafts. It was later used as an art studio. From 1958 to 1964, restoration works took place in celebration of the 1500th Jubilee of the founding of Tbilisi, which changed the view of the church back to the seventeenth-century version; however, it was not until 1991, after the independence of Georgia was restored, that the basilica reverted to religious use.

The Anchiskhati Choir based out of the Anchiskhati Basilica is the world's leading exponent of Georgian polyphonic choral music.

== Architecture ==
Anchiskhati Basilica is a three-span basilica, divided by two abutments forming horseshoe shaped conches, which indicates the antiquity of its construction. Originally constructed of blocks of yellow tuff stone, the 1958-1964 restoration made extensive use of brick. The structure has entrances on three sides, but today only the western entrance is in use. Aside from the altarpiece, which was painted in 1683 by order of Catholicos Nikoloz Amilakhvari, all of the remaining paintings in the church date from the 19th century.
