= Shalva Amiranashvili =

Georgian art historian (1899–1975)

- შალვა ამირანაშვილი
- Born: March 26, 1899; Oni, Racha uezd, Kutaisi Governorate, Russian Empire
- Died: February 9, 1975 (aged 75); Tbilisi
- Education: Tbilisi State University
- Occupation: Art historian

Shalva Amiranashvili (Georgian: შალვა ამირანაშვილი; 26 March 1899 – 9 February 1975) was a Georgian art historian, one of the first to engage in systematic scholarly treatment of the art of Georgia. His name was posthumously given, in 1991, to the Art Museum of Georgia, which he had directed for 36 years, from 1939 to 1975.

Amiranashvili was born in the small mountainous Georgian town of Oni (then part of the Kutais Governorate, Russian Empire) in a local teacher's family. He was among the first graduates of the newly founded Tbilisi State University (TSU) in 1922. After spending two years in Moscow and Leningrad, where he specialized in Old Russian and Byzantine arts, Amiranashvili taught at the TSU and Tbilisi State Academy of Arts. He was placed in charge of the Department of History and Theory of Arts at the TSU in 1925 and earned a degree of professor in 1936. From 1939 to 1975, he was a director of the Art Museum of Georgia. In 1945, he was sent by the Soviet government to Paris to oversee the repatriation of the Georgian antiquities evacuated to France following the 1921 Bolshevik takeover of Georgia.

Amiranashvili was elected a corresponding member of the Soviet Academy of Sciences in 1943, member of the Georgian Academy of Sciences in 1955, and member of the National Committee of Soviet Museums and International Council of Museums in 1957. He was named as a Honored Scientist of Georgia in 1959. He was, further, elected a deputy to the 6th and 7th Convocations of the Supreme Soviet of the Georgian SSR in the 1960s. He was decorated by the state on several occasions, including with the Order of Lenin. Amiranashvili died in 1975 and was buried at the Didube Pantheon in Tbilisi.

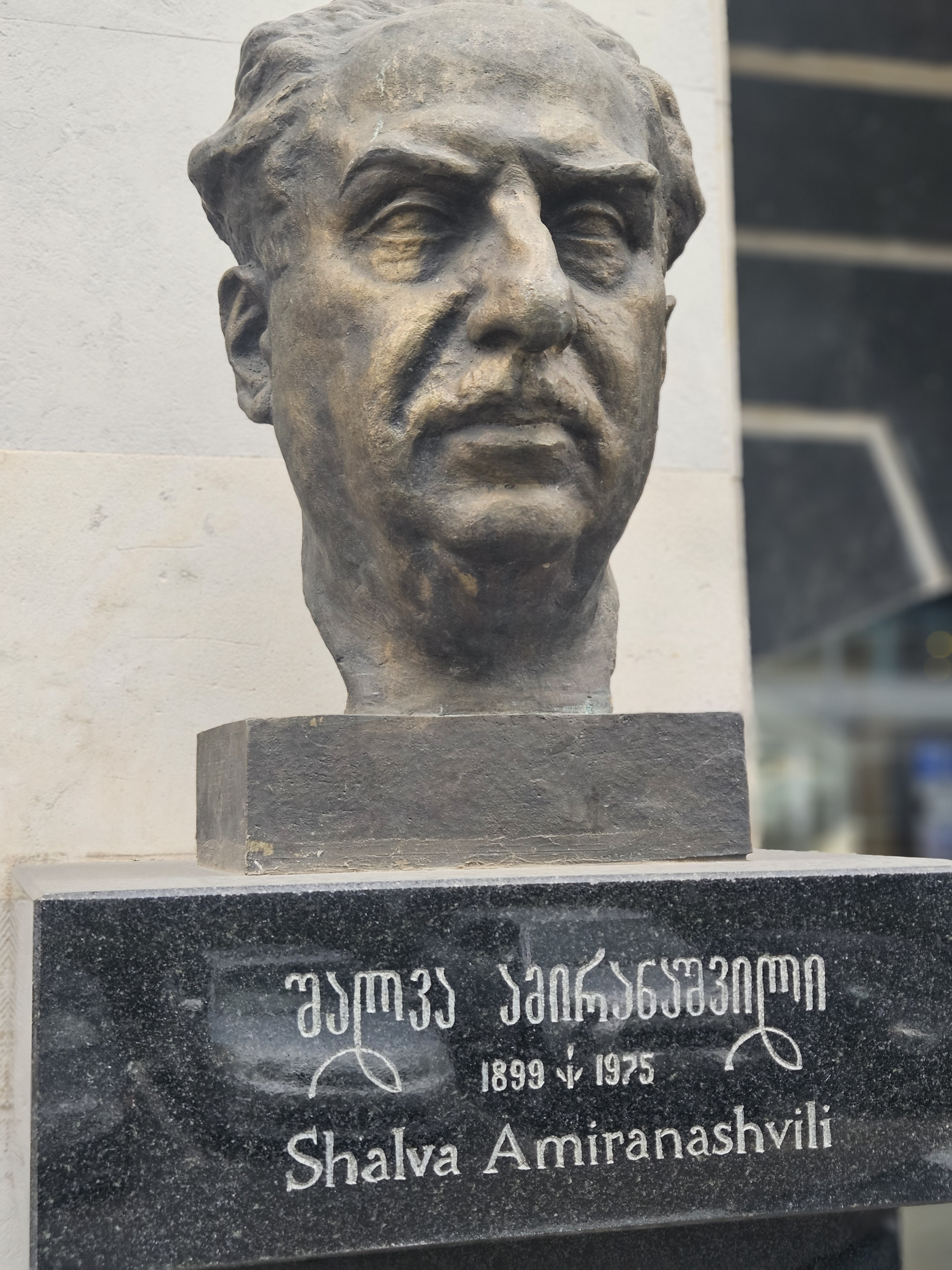
Shalva Amiranashvili

Shalva Amiranashvili published over 100 titles on a wide range of topics from the history of Georgian arts. His best-known monographs deal with the pieces of medieval Georgian visual arts, such as illuminated manuscript miniatures, cloisonne, and frescoes. His magnum opus is "A History of the Georgian Art", a voluminous survey of Georgian art, first published in Georgian (1950) and Russian (1963).
