= Ancha monastery =

Medieval Georgian monastery in present day Turkey

Coordinates: 41°11′32″N 42°06′35″E

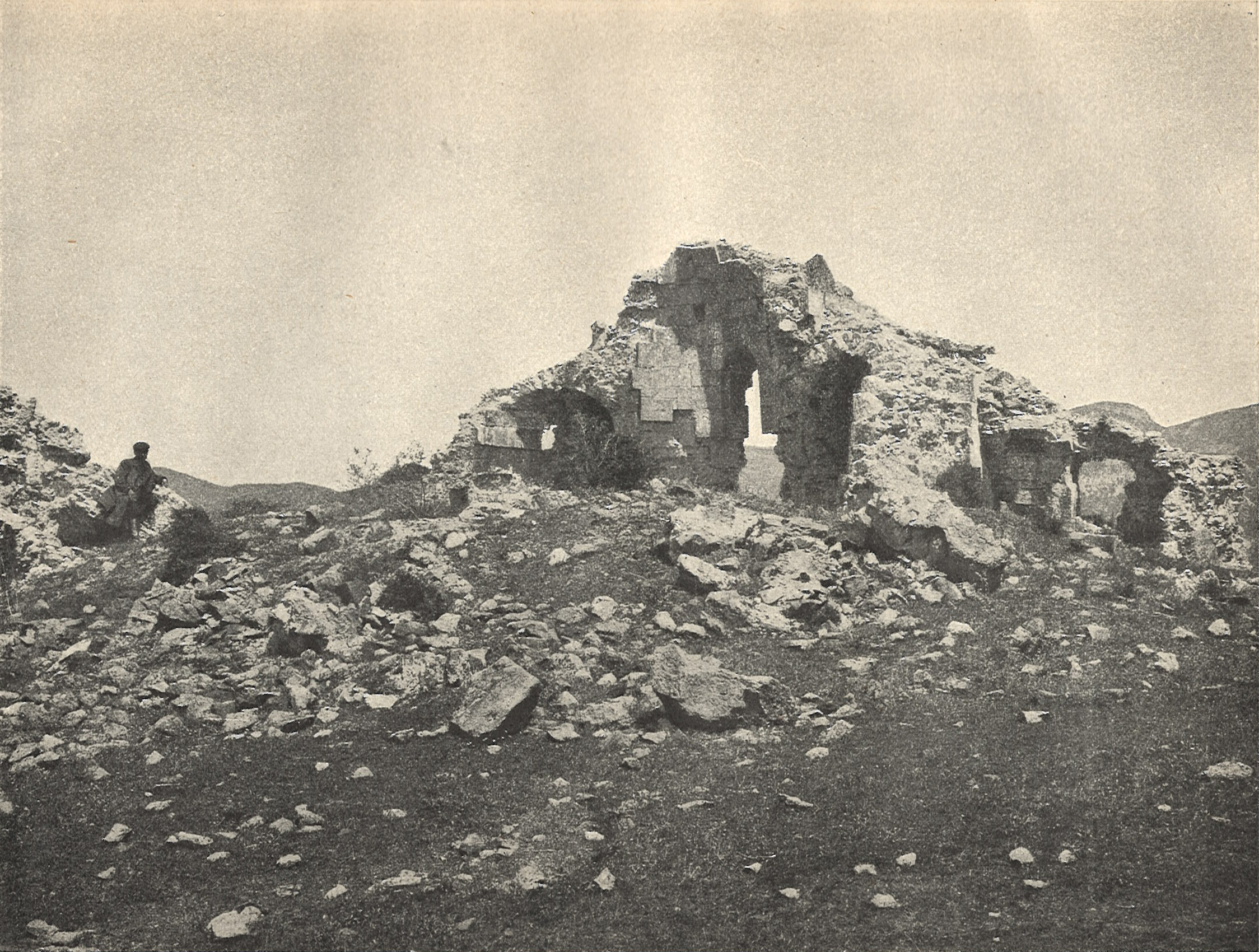
Anca monastery as of 1903. A photo from the travelogue of Nicholas Marr.

Ancha (Georgian: ანჩის მონასტერი, anchis monasteri) was a medieval Georgian monastery and cathedral church of the Bishopric of Ancha, located near what is now the village of Anaçlı, Artvin Province, Turkey. Purportedly once a cross-in-square design, the church now lies almost completely in ruins.

The earliest recorded information about the monastery of Ancha is found in c. 951 Vitae of Gregory of Khandzta by Giorgi Merchule, which dates the church roughly to the early 9th century. It functioned as one of the principal religious and cultural centers of the principality of Klarjeti, which was wrested of the Georgian control by the Ottoman Empire in the 1550s. By the middle of the 17th century, the church had been completely abandoned. Its surviving Christian relics, such as the venerated icon of the Savior, were transferred to the Georgian capital of Tbilisi. Shortly after the Russian takeover of the Artvin province, the historical Georgian churches and monasteries of the area were visited, in 1879, by the Georgian scholar Dimitri Bakradze, who reported severe damage to Ancha. In 1904, Nicholas Marr reported that only a portion of the monastery’s north-western and northern walls and an altar apse with a fragment of the cupola had been survived. Nowadays, the building is almost completely ruined.
