= Gerzel Baazov =

Gerzel Baazov (Georgian: გერცელ ბააზოვი; October 28, 1904 – September 12, 1938) was a Georgian Jewish poet and playwright who fell victim to Joseph Stalin's Great Purges.

He was born in Oni, Georgia (then part of the Russian Empire) into the family of the leading Georgian Zionist David Baazov. At the age of 14, he published his first poems under the pen name of Ger-Bi (1918). In the 1920s, he systematically published poems, historical stories and journalistic essays in Georgian-Jewish press and garnered acclaim with his Georgian translation of Song of Songs in 1924. In 1925, he organized a Tbilisi-based Georgian-Jewish dramatic troupe "Kadima" and began writing plays depicting the life of the Georgian Jews. In 1927, he graduated from the Faculty of Law, Tbilisi State University, and briefly served as a lawyer.

Through his 1928 play Dilleamari (დილლეამარი), Baazov established himself as a leading writer in Georgian on Jewish themes. He was the first Jewish writer to introduce the subject matter of the life-style, character, and routine life of Georgian Jews into Georgian literature. In an amazingly brief period, Baazov wrote ten plays (notably The Mutes Began to Speak [მუნჯები ალაპარაკდნენ, 1931], Without Respect of Persons [განურჩევლად პიროვნებისა, 1933], Itska Rizhinashvili [იცკა რიჟინაშვილი, 1936], etc.), most of which became standard items in Georgian repertory in the 1930s. Early in the 1930s, he conceived a trilogy on the Georgian Jews, the first part of which – Petkhaini – appeared in Georgian (ფეთხაინი, 1934) and Russian (Петхайн, 1936). His prolific work was terminated by the Soviet political repressions under Stalin. In 1937, he was arrested in Moscow and extradited to Tbilisi where he was either shot or tortured to death during the interrogation. He was posthumously rehabilitated in 1955. A street in his native Oni has been named after Gerzel Baazov.
