= Georgian monarchs family tree of Bagrationi dynasty of Kartli =

Georgian monarchs family tree of Bagrationi dynasty of Kartli

- The background indicates adoption by King Rostom
- The background indicates the tavadi line of the House of Mukhrani

BAGRATIONI of united Georgia
Constantine I King of Georgia r.1407–1412
Prince George; Co-king of Georgia r.1408–1412	Alexander I King of Georgia; 1390–1445/46 r.1412–1442	Bagrat
Bagrat VI c. 1435–1478; King of Imereti r.1463–1478 King of Georgia r.1466–1478	Prince Demetrius c. 1413-1453; Co-King of Georgia r.1433–1446	George VIII; 1415/17–1476; King of Georgia r.1446–1476
BAGRATIONI of Imereti	BAGRATIONI of Kakheti
Constantine II c. 1447–1505; King of Georgia (Kartli) r.1478–1505
Targamos fl.1517–1525	Dimitri; Co-king; 1488–1490	Vakhtang fl.1526	Alexander fl.1526–1556	Melchizedek II; Catholicos Patriarch of Georgia d. 1553
House of MUKHRANI
David X Died in	George IX d. 1539; King of Kartli r.1525–1527/34	Gulshar	Astandar	Bagrat, Prince of Mukhrani c. 1487–c. 1540; Prince of Mukhrani r.1512–1539	Martha
Luarsab I King of Kartli btw.1502/1509–1556 r.1527-1556	Adarnase fl.1512–1558	Ramaz fl.1512–1580	Demetre fl.1516–1540	Bezhan	Dedisimedi d. c. 1595	Ashotan I d. 1561; Prince of Mukhrani r.1539–1561	Archil fl.1540–1582	Vakhtang I 1511–1580; Prince of Mukhrani r.1539–1580
Simon I 1537–1611; King of Kartli r.1556–1569; 1578–1600	David XI {{Small1540–1582; King of Kartli r.1562/1569–1578}}	Levan	Alexander fl. 1546–1573	Vakhtang c. 1546–1605	Teimuraz; 1572–1625; Prince of Mukhrani; 1580/1605–1625; Regent of Kartli r.1623–1625
Aleksandre fl.1561–1589	Vakhtang fl.1600
George X King of Kartli; 1560–1606 r.1600–1606	Luarsab fl.1561–1589	Elene fl.1583–1609	Fahrijan Begum fl. 1582	Bagrat VII d. 1619; King of Kartli r.1616–1619	Rostom; 1565–1658; King of Kartli r.1633–1658	Teimuraz Mirza of Kartli
Luarsab II; 1592–1622; King of Kartli r.1606–1615	Pahrijan Begum	Simon II; King of Kartli c. 1608–1631 r.1619–1631	Vakhtang V d. 1676; Prince of Mukhrani r.1629–1658 King of Kartli; 1658–1676	Luarsab d. 1652	Constantine I fl.1622–1668 Prince of Mukhrani r.1658–1668
Archil II; 1647–1713; King of Imereti; 1661–1663; 1678–1679; 1690–1691; 1695–1696; 1698–1699; King of Kakheti; 1664–1675	Prince Levan d. 1709; Regent of Kartli r.1703–1704	George XI d. 1709; King of Kartli r.1676–1688; 1703–1709	Alexander fl.1666–1697	Luarsab d. 1698	Solomon; Suleiman Mirza d. 1703	Ana (Anuka) d. 1697	Teimuraz II; 1649–1688; Prince of Mukhrani r.1667–1688
Kaikhosro; 1674–1711; King of Kartli r.1709–1711	David; 1676–1703	Domentius; Patriarch of Georgia r.1705–1724; 1739–1741
Vakhtang VI; 1675–1737; King of Kartli r.1716–1724	Jesse; 1680/1682–1727; King of Kartli r.1714–1716 1724–1727	Simon; 1683–1740; Regent of Kartli r.1712 –1714	Teimuraz d. 1710	Alexander c. 1688–1711	Rostom d. 1722	Adarnase d. 1784	Constantine IId. 1716; Prince of Mukhrani r.1696–1700
George; 1712–1786	Tamar II; 1696–1746)	Alexander Ishaq Beg c. 1705/8–1773	Archil Abdullah Beg; 1713–1762	Anton I Catholicos Patriarch of Georgia; 1720–1788	Constantine III; 1696–1756; Prince of Mukhrani r.1735–1755
Tuta; 1699–1746	Vakhushti	Bakar; 1699/1700–1750; Regent of Kartli r.1716–1719	Ana; 1698–1746	Paata; 1720–1765	Ioane I 1755–1801; Prince of Mukhrani r.1785–1801
Grigol Bagration of Mukhrani; 1787–1861	Constantine IV; 1782–1842; Prince of Mukhrani r.1801 Head of Mukhrani; 1801–1842
Ivane Bagration; 1812–1895; Head of Mukhrani; 1842—1895	Irakli Bagration; 1813–1892
Constantine Bagration; 1838–1903; Head of Mukhrani r.1895–1903	Alexander Bagration; 1853–1918; Head of Mukhrani r.1903–1918
George Bagration; 1884–1957; Head of Mukhrani; 1918—1957
Vladimir Kirillovich; Grand Duke of Russia; 1917–1992	Leonida Bagration of Mukhrani; 1914–2010	Maria Bagration of Mukhrani	Irakli Bagration; 1909–1977; Head of Mukhrani r.1957-1977 Head of Bagrationi r.1957–1977
Maria Vladimirovna; Grand Duchess of Russia b. 1953	Mariam de Bagration b. 1947	Jorge de Bagration; 1944–2008; Head of Mukhrani r.1977–2008	Bagrat de Bagration y de Baviera; 1949–2017
BAGRATIONI of Kakheti
George Mikhailovich; Grand Duke of Russia b. 1981	Ana Bagration -Gruzinsky b. 1976	David Bagration b. 1976; Head of Mukhrani r. 2008–present	Ugo Bagration b. 1985
Alexander Romanov b. 2022	Giorgi Bagrationi b. 2011

== Notes ==
1. King Rostom, approaching 90, had adopted great-grandson of King Luarsab I, also Luarsab, as heir. Kartli's aristocracy resented yet another Persian-educated Muslim; Luarsab’s death in 1652 from a bullet while out hunting was no accident. Rostom then chose Vakhtang, the 35-year-old head of the House of Mukhrani, a branch of Bagrationi.
2. The tavadi were "grand nobles" who owned large satavado estates. Each satavado had its own sign of distinction and was granted by the king; after the tavadi died, the sign was returned to the king, who granted it to the new tavadi.

== Bibliography ==
- Rayfield, D. (2013) Edge of Empires: A History of Georgia, Reaktion Books, ISBN 978-1-78023-070-2
- W.E.D. Allen (1970) Russian Embassies to the Georgian Kings, 1589–1605, Hakluyt Society, ISBN 978-1-4094-4599-9 (hbk)
- Mikaberidze, A. (2015) Historical Dictionary of Georgia, Bloomsbury Publishing, ISBN 979-8-216-23916-1
