= Prince Simon of Kartli =

Georgian prince

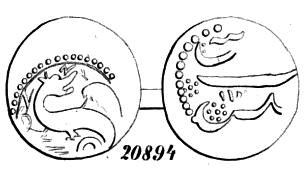
- Coin struck at the behest of Prince-Regent Simon of Kartli in 1712.

Regent of Kartli
- Regency: 1712–1714
- Born: 9 November 1683
- Died: 27 January 1740 (aged 56)
- Spouse: Gulkan of Aragvi; Ana Amilakhvari
- Issue: Nikoloz; Archil; Beri; Stepane; Dimitri; Mikheil
- Dynasty: Bagrationi
- Father: Prince Levan of Kartli
- Mother: Tinatin Avalishvili
- Religion: Georgian Orthodox Church

Simon (Georgian: სიმონ; 9 November 1683 – 27 January 1740) was a Georgian prince royal (batonishvili) of the Bagrationi dynasty of House of Mukhrani of Kartli and a son of Prince Levan of Kartli by his second wife, Tinatin Avalishvili. Simon ruled Kartli as a regent from 1712 to 1714 during the absence of his half-brother Vakhtang VI at the Safavid court in Iran. Afterwards, he switched sides between Vakhtang and his renegade sibling Jesse and ended up in exile in the Russian Empire as part of Vakhtang's entourage.

== Early life and career ==
Simon became involved in the politics and administration of the country during the regency of his half-brother, Vakhtang, who ruled Kartli, with his capital at Tbilisi, in the absence of the two successive kings, his uncle George XI and his brother Kaikhosro, at the Safavid Iranian military service in Afghanistan, from 1703 to 1712. During this period, Simon stood by Vakhtang, a prolific ruler, who substantially revised the Georgian law and oversaw a series of political reforms and cultural projects.

== Regency ==
After the death of Kaikhosro on the Afghan front in 1711, Vakhtang repaired to Isfahan to receive his investiture from Shah Soltan Hoseyn in 1712, leaving Simon as a regent (janishin) in Kartli. Vakhtang was detained in Iran and was unable to return to his kingdom until after he had to accede to the shah's request to convert to Islam in 1716. During his tenure, Simon continued to support Vakhtang's cultural projects, such as sponsoring the recently opened printing press in Tbilisi and, further, revived a monetary series in copper with specifically Georgian features in parallel to the standard Safavid silver coinage struck at the shah's mint in Tbilisi.

In the meantime, political intrigues in Tbilisi were rife. Uncertainty over Vakhtang's prospect of returning was seen by Simon no less than Vakhtang's other siblings—Prince Jesse and, as suspected, even the head of the Georgian Orthodox Church Catholicos Domentius—as an opportunity to advance their regal ambitions. Simon arrested the catholicos and sent him for punishment to Vakhtang's son Prince Bakar, but the prelate was saved thanks to the intervention of Vakhtang's wife Rusudan. The shah was dissatisfied with Simon, ostensibly, on account of his abuse of power. In this time of a general crisis in the country, Simon had indeed amassed personal wealth. Another possible reason of him falling out of favor with the shah was Simon's connection with the French Lazarist missionary, the abbé Jean Richard, who accompanied Vakhtang's envoy Sulkhan-Saba Orbeliani in a mission to Rome and Paris, pleading for pressure on the shah to release Vakhtang.

== Between Jesse and Vakhtang ==
The shah's plenipotentiary Kholofa, arriving in Tbilisi in 1714, successfully lobbied for more amenable Prince Jesse (Shah Quli Khan), a convert to Islam. Simon also joined the endeavor and the party obtained confirmation for Jesse as king instead of Vakhtang. Relying on the Persian support, Jesse harassed Vakhtang's immediate family and supporters. After Vakhtang at last became a Muslim, the shah, tired of Jesse's inefficient rule, confirmed Vakhtang on the throne and nominated his son Bakar regent of Kartli until Vakhtang's own return there. Bakar cast Jesse in prison and repressed his allies, but Simon was spared. He was, further, put in command of a force, which defeated the marauding Lezgin bands in Kvemo Kartli in 1717.

After Vakhtang's return to Kartli in 1719, Simon retired from politics and government and lived at his estate at Beshtasheni in Somkhiti. In 1723, when Constantine II of Kakheti put Tbilisi under siege, Simon was put by Vakhtang in charge of defense of the strategic Avlabari Bridge at Tbilisi, but the prince failed in his mission and Constantine II succeeded in dislodging Vakhtang from his capital. Simon was then with Vakhtang and Bakar in their guerrilla war and, joined by Shanshe, Duke of Ksani, attacked, unsuccessfully, Constantine's Lezgian mercenaries in the Tsilkani fortress, north of Tbilisi. Eventually, Simon followed Vakhtang, dispossessed of his kingdom, into an exile in the Russian Empire, while Jesse once again attained to the throne of Kartli, this time under the Ottoman hegemony. Simon, known in Russia as the tsarevich Simeon Leonovich (Russian: Симеон Леонович) died at the age of 56 in 1740. He was buried at the Alexander Nevsky Lavra.

== Family ==
Simon first married Gulkan (died 1717), daughter of Bardzim, Duke of Aragvi. She died in a plague outbreak in 1717 and was buried at Mtskheta. They had three sons:

- Prince Nikoloz, who had one son, Fyodor (born 1764);
- Prince Archil;
- Prince Beri (fl. 1724).

Following Gulkan's death, Simon married Ana (fl. 1724–1745), daughter of Prince Paata Amilakhvari. They had three sons:

- Prince Stepane (1727–1745);
- Prince Dimitri (1729–1744);
- Prince Mikheil (fl. 1734).

== Ancestry ==
Ancestors of Prince Simon of Kartli

16. Vakhtang I, Prince of Mukhrani
8. Teimuraz I, Prince of Mukhrani
4. Vakhtang V
18. Nugzar, Duke of Aragvi
9. Ana Eristavi
19. Dedisimedi N. or Mariam Cholokashvili
2. Prince Levan of Kartli
20. Orbel Baratashvili
10. Qaplan Baratashvili-Orbelishvili
5. Rodam Kaplanishvili-Orbeliani
22. N.N, Meskhian amilakhor
11. Tamar N.
1. Simon
3. Tinatin Avalishvili
