= Prince Rostom of Kartli =

Georgian prince

Qollar-aghasi (Commander of gholam corps)
- In office: 1717–1720
- Predecessor: Safiqoli Khan
- Successor: Ahmad Agha
- Shah: Soltan Hoseyn
- Died: 8 March 1722; Golūnābād, Isfahan, Iran
- Dynasty: Bagrationi
- Father: Prince Levan of Kartli
- Military career
- Allegiance: Safavid Iran
- Conflicts: Afghan Rebellions of 1709–1726; Battle of Gulnabad †

Rostom (Georgian: როსტომი) or Rustam Khan (Persian: رستم خان; died 8 March 1722) was a Georgian prince, member of the Bagratid House of Mukhrani of Kartli, and a general in the service of the Safavid dynasty of Iran. He was killed by the Afghan rebels at the climactic battle of Gulnabad.

== Family background ==
Rostom was a natural son of Prince Levan of Kartli, the regent of Kartli, by an unknown concubine. He was a half-brother of three monarchs of Kartli—Kaikhosro, Vakhtang VI, and Jesse—and the Catholicos Patriarch of the Georgian Orthodox Church, Domentius IV. Rostom's career, like those of many of his relatives, was shaped by the political hegemony of Safavid Iran over Kartli. He spent many years far from his homeland as a member of the Safavid élite to which he was also related by kinship: he was married to a daughter of Fath 'Ali Khan Daghestani, who served as grand vizier (chief minister) of Iran from 1716 to 1720.

== Safavid general ==
Rostom's appointments in the Safavid service included being darugha (prefect) of the capital city of Isfahan in 1709, khan (governor) of Kerman in 1717, and qullar-aqasi (commander) of the shah's élite ghulam regiments in 1717. In this latter capacity he served through the Afghan revolts, which had taken lives of Rostom's uncle, George XI (Gurgin Khan), his half-brother, Kaikhosro, and a cousin, Alexander.

Rostom played a prominent role in the battle with the Afghan rebels led by Mahmud Hotak at Gulnabad, close to Isfahan, on 8 March 1722. The grand vizier, Muhammad-Quli-Khan Shamlu, urged patience and avoidance of a pitched battle before putting the capital's defences in a state of proper readiness. Rostom, being in command of the Safavid right wing, went ahead with an attack and successfully charged the Afghan left wing. In the meantime, the Arab cavalry of the Safavid army, tempted into looting the Afghan baggage train, detached from the fighting and the grand vizier also failed to advance with his main troops. Mahmud had his forces regrouped and surrounded Rostom's men, who fought with desperate courage until completely annihilated. On his retreat, Rostom fell off when his horse stumbled in the mud. An Afghan soldier hit him with a flail and others repeatedly speared him with their lances, killing him.

The battle occasioned the downfall of the Safavid dynasty. In vain did the beleaguered shah Soltan Hoseyn urge Vakhtang VI to come to his aid. After a six-month siege, Isfahan fell to Mahmud's army and the Afghan chieftain took over the shah's throne.

== See also ==
- List of Safavid governors of Kerman

== Sources ==
- Floor, Willem (2001). Safavid Government Institutions. Costa Mesa, California: Mazda Publishers. ISBN 978-1568591353.

Preceded by Safiqoli Khan	Commander of the gholam corps (qollar-aghasi); 1717–1722	Succeeded by Ahmad Agha
