= Domentius IV of Georgia =

Domentius IV

Catholicos Patriarch of Georgia
- Tenure: 1705—1724 and 1739—1741
- Born: 1677
- Died: 1741 (aged 63–64)
- Dynasty: Bagrationi dynasty
- Father: Prince Levan of Kartli
- Mother: Tuta Gurieli
- Religion: Georgian Orthodox Church
- Khelrtva

Domentius IV (Georgian: დომენტი IV, romanized: doment'i IV, secular name Damian Bagrationi, Georgian: დამიანე ბაგრატიონი; 1677–1741) was the Catholicos Patriarch of Georgia from 1705 to 1724 and again from 1739 to 1741. He was a member of the royal Mukhrani branch of the Bagrationi dynasty, born as a younger son of Prince Levan of Kartli and his first wife Tuta Gurieli. Domentius was energetically involved in the politics of Kartli and, according to some contemporary accounts, he even had regal ambitions. The split in his patriarchal tenure was due to his opposition to the accession of the Ottoman regime in Kartli and he spent thirteen years in the Ottoman captivity from 1725 to 1737. A man of letters, Domentius compiled a collection of Georgian hagiography. He also sponsored reconstruction and repair of several churches and monasteries in Georgia. His regnal name is sometimes given as Domentius III.

== Family and early life ==
Domentius was born in 1677 into the royal family of Kartli. His father was Levan, the Georgian prince royal. His mother, Tuta Gurieli, of the princely dynasty of Guria, died a year after his birth. Among the siblings of Domentius were three future kings of Kartli, Kaikhosro and Vakhtang VI—his brothers—and Jesse, his half-brother. Almost nothing is known of Domentius's early life. After his mother's death, Domentius was cared for by the certain Barbara, whom he mentions in his Jerusalemite records of 1699. Domentius was tonsured as a monk at an early age under the name of Damian and spent some time in Jerusalem. He traveled extensively, visiting also Turkey, Iran, and Russia.

== First patriarchal term ==
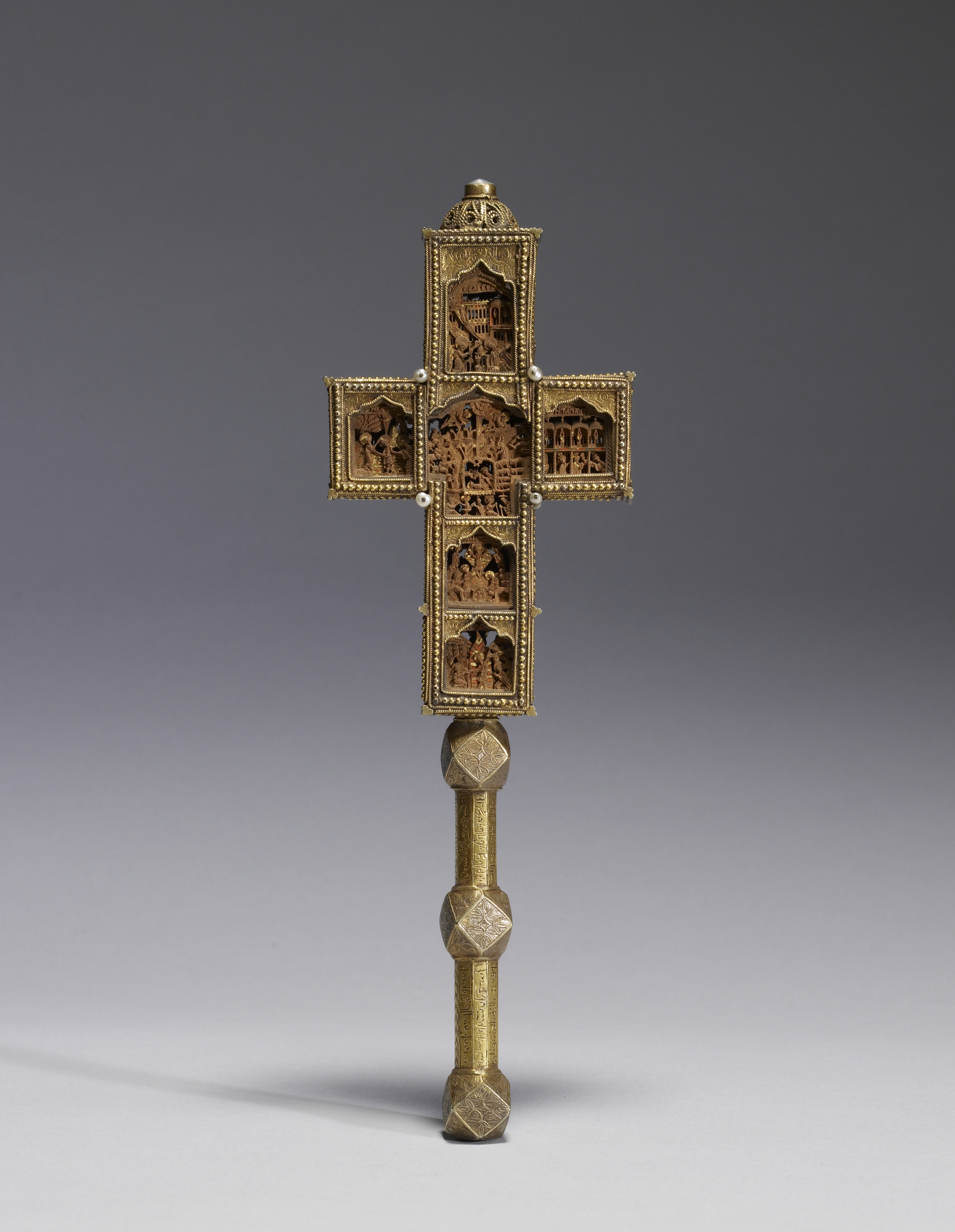
A benediction cross of Domentius IV (Walters Art Museum).

In 1705, Domentius, then aged around 28, was elected the head of the Georgian Orthodox Church after the synod convened by his brother Vakhtang, regent of Kartli for his absent uncle, George XI (Gurgin Khan), accused the catholicos Eudemus II of "ignorance" and removed him from the position. The Safavid government of Iran, claiming sovereignty over Kartli, tolerated Vakhtang's support of the church owing to the contribution of the Georgian royals fighting on the Afghan front.

By the time of Domentius's accession, the Georgian church had been split into the two, eastern and western counterparts, reflecting the political division of the country back in the 15th century. Domentius, albeit holding sway only of the eastern church, embarked on a program to restore the prestige and influence of the Georgian catholicosate. Inclined to underscore his hierarchical supremacy, the new prelate resumed using the title of patriarch, for a time forgotten by the Georgian catholicoi as their church had experienced decline under the Iranian hegemony. He exploited his royal origin and wealth to restore the churches and monasteries across the country, commissioned copies of old manuscripts, had the Greek Breviary translated and published—one of the first books printed in Georgia—in Tbilisi in 1719.

In 1708, Domentius reclaimed the former catholicosal holdings from David II (Imam-Quli Khan), a Muslim Georgian king of Kakheti. To this end, the patriarch had traveled, in 1707, to Iran in order to convince the shah to force his reluctant vassal in Kakheti into concessions. The 18th-century European authors such as Judasz Tadeusz Krusinski and the Capuchin missionary Pierre d'Issoudun report that Domentius, while visiting Iran, offered to unfrock himself, marry and convert to Islam, hoping to accede to the throne of Kartli. For this, Krusiński claims, Levan, himself a Muslim, had him thrashed on the soles of his feet. While the trustfulness of these reports remain disputed to this day, the rumors were current in Domentius's time as suggested in the historical poem Bakariani written by the catholicos's companion Iese Tlashadze.

In 1712, the shah Soltan Hoseyn summoned Vakhtang VI to Kirman and detained him for refusing Islam. Vakhtang sent his relative, Sulkhan-Saba Orbeliani, to Pope Clement XI and King Louis XIV of France, pleading for pressure on the shah to release Vakhtang, hinting that the Georgian church might accept the pope's authority, a proposition which Domentius supported. The nobles of Kartli did not support these efforts, fearing the Iranian retribution. Vakhtang would eventually accede and convert to Islam to end the intrigues which plagued the country in his absence and also involved the catholicos Domentius. While Vakhtang was in Iran, his half-brother and a lieutenant in charge of Kartli, Prince Simon, arrested Domentius and sent for punishment to Vakhtang's heir Bakar, but the prelate was saved through the intervention of Vakhtang's wife Rusudan. When Vakhtang's pro-Iranian and Muslim half-brother Jesse was installed as king in 1714, Bakar retreated to the mountains and Domentius was restored to favor.

== Exile and the second term ==
In 1719, Vakhtang VI, having accepted Islam, returned to rule Kartli. Domentius's tenure remained undisturbed until 1723, when Kartli was invaded by the Ottoman army, forcing Vakhtang VI into exile to Russia. The catholicos himself withdrew to Lore and then to the mountainous Ksani valley and was stripped of his office by his half-brother Jesse, now in power under the Ottoman protection. The priest Bessarion was installed in his stead. In 1725, Domentius was summoned to Constantinople, where his catholicosal land holdings were confirmed by the sultan Ahmed III. But the Ottoman government decided that he was too unreliable to be allowed back in Georgia and, in December 1727, sent him into exile on the Aegean island of Tenedos, where he remained until 1736. Domentius was not able to return to Kartli until November 1739 and was immediately restored to his office with the approval of Nader Shah of Iran, Kartli's new overlord, whom he and many other Georgian dignitaries met at Derbent. He died in 1741 and was buried at the Svetitskhoveli Cathedral.

== Ancestry ==
Ancestors of Domentius IV of Georgia

16. Vakhtang I, Prince of Mukhrani
8. Teimuraz I, Prince of Mukhrani
4. Vakhtang V
18. Nugzar, Duke of Aragvi
9. Ana Eristavi
19. Dedisimedi N. or Mariam Cholokashvili
2. Prince Levan of Kartli
20. Orbel Baratashvili
10. Qaplan Baratashvili-Orbelishvili
5. Rodam Kaplanishvili-Orbeliani
22. N.N, Meskhian amilakhor
11. Tamar N.
1. Domentius (Damian)
24. Rostom Gurieli
12. Vakhtang I Gurieli
25. Tinatin N.
6. Kaikhosro I Gurieli
26. Kaikhosro II Jaqeli
13. Tamar Jaqeli
27. Dedisimedi of Mukhrani
3. Tuta Gurieli
7. Khvaramze Goshadze

== Notes ==
Eastern Orthodox Church titles
| Preceded by Eudemus II | Catholicos-Patriarch of Georgia; 1705–1724 | Succeeded by Bessarion |
| Preceded by Cyril | Catholicos-Patriarch of Georgia; 1739–1741 | Succeeded by Nicholas VIII |
