= Bakar of Kartli =

Georgian prince

Bakar
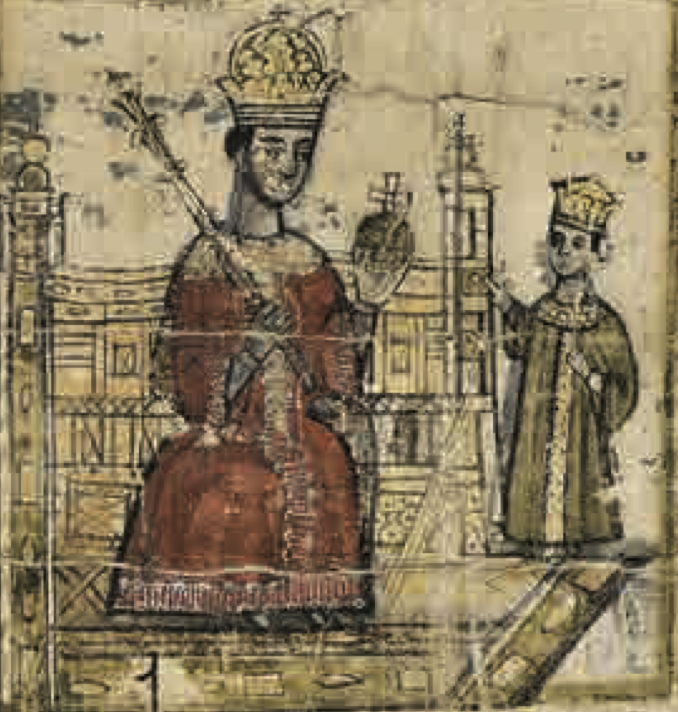
- Bakar sitting on the throne, 1712 charter

King of Kartli
- 1st reign: 1717–1719
- Predecessor: Jesse
- Successor: Vakhtang VI
- Co-king: Vakhtang VI
- Born: 7 April 1700; Kharagauli
- Died: 1 February 1750 (aged 49); Moscow
- Burial: Donskoy Monastery
- Spouse: Ana of Aragvi
- Issue Among others: Prince Alexander; Prince Levan
- Dynasty: Bagrationi
- Father: Vakhtang VI
- Mother: Rusudan of Circassia
- Religion: Georgian Orthodox Church
- Khelrtva

Bakar (Georgian: ბაქარ; 7 April 1700 – 1 February 1750), of the Bagrationi dynasty, was appointed regent of Kartli in 1716, and in the absence of Vakhtang VI, he ruled as king (mepe) of Kartli from 1717 to 1719 under the Persian title Shah Navaz Khan III, and briefly reigned again from 1723 to 1724 under the Ottoman title Ibrahim Pasha.

Born into a dynasty that had ruled Kartli since 1658, Bakar was the son of king Vakhtang VI and was involved in state affairs from an early age. Part of his youth was spent in exile during the violent reign of his uncle Jesse of Kartli (r. 1714–1716). At the age of sixteen, he was appointed by the Safavid authorities to govern Kartli in his father’s absence, while Vakhtang VI was active in Persia, a regency that lasted until 1719. During this period, Bakar challenged the power of the local nobility and introduced a number of internal reforms, before relinquishing authority to his father following a Lezgin invasion.

A supporter of a pro-Persian orientation for Georgia, Bakar was appointed commander of Shah Soltan Hoseyn's imperial guard in 1722. However, Vakhtang VI prevented him from aiding the Safavids during the Afghan invasion of Persia. Vakhtang’s subsequent shift toward a pro-Russian foreign policy led to open conflict between the Persian forces in the Caucasus and the Georgian royal family. Despite Bakar’s military efforts, Vakhtang VI was deposed in 1723. In June of that year, following an Ottoman invasion, Bakar was restored to power and installed as king in Tbilisi. His reign proved short-lived: effective control of Kartli rested with the Ottoman authorities, prompting Bakar to rebel against his own government and wage guerrilla warfare alongside his father.

Lacking international support and facing overwhelming opposition, Bakar and the royal family went into exile in Russia in July 1724, establishing a significant Georgian community in Moscow. There, Bakar entered Russian military and diplomatic service and became involved in imperial policy in the North Caucasus. Repeated attempts to restore him to the Georgian throne failed due to Russia’s reluctance to provide military backing. After the death of Vakhtang VI in 1737, Bakar became a claimant to the throne of Kartli. In Moscow, he led a prosperous Georgian émigré community under Russian protection and, together with his brother Vakhushti, created an important cultural center that included a major printing press.

== Early life ==
=== Youth ===
Bakar was born on 7 April 1700 (or 11 June 1699), the first legitimate son of Prince Vakhtang, a grandson of King Vakhtang V (r. 1658–1676), and Rusudan of Circassia, a princess from the North Caucasus. He also had an elder half-brother, Vakhushti, the illegitimate son of Vakhtang.

Bakar was born in the citadel of Kharagauli, in the Kingdom of Imereti, where his father was living in exile following the expulsion of his uncle George XI from the throne of Kartli by Heraclius I. In 1703, the royal family returned to Tbilisi, the capital of Kartli, after Vakhtang was appointed regent of the kingdom by Persia, acting in place of the restored George XI, who was then campaigning in Afghanistan.

Bakar and Vakhushti received a princely education under the supervision of the Orthodox deacons Jesse and Giorgi Garsevanishvili. Vakhtang strictly forbade contact between his sons and the numerous Catholic missionaries active in Georgia at the time under his protection, in order to preserve their Orthodox upbringing.

In 1712, Vakhtang was summoned to Isfahan to the court of Shah Soltan Hoseyn to receive the title of wali. Anticipating a prolonged absence and fearing for the safety of his family in the capital, he settled Princess Rusudan and their children in Gori. Vakhtang’s refusal to convert to Islam ultimately compelled him to remain in Persia until 1719.

=== Early political activity ===
Despite his young age, Bakar quickly became involved in the diplomatic affairs of Kartli. At the age of thirteen, he worked alongside the Catholicos Domentius IV in shaping Tbilisi's policy toward neighboring Imereti, then in the midst of a civil war. In this context, he supported the princes Zurab Abashidze and Mamia III Gurieli in their struggle against King George VI of Imereti. In the autumn, Bakar received Abashidze in Kartli and provided him with a military escort to help him return safely to his domains in Racha. During the winter of 1712–1713, he met Mamia of Guria at Tskhinvali and escorted him to Gori with great honors, thereby ensuring him safe passage back to his Black Sea principality.

This policy was soon overturned by Prince Simon, Bakar’s uncle and the administrator of the kingdom following Vakhtang’s departure. Simon turned against Mamia Gurieli, granted asylum to George VI of Imereti after the latter was overthrown by Mamia in 1713, and helped him regain the throne a few months later.

In March 1714, Persia appointed as King of Kartli Vakhtang’s Muslim brother and a general in Persian service, Jesse. Upon his arrival in Georgia in October, Rusudan, Bakar, and the other members of the royal family hastily left Gori to escape what soon proved to be a reign of anti-Christian terror imposed by Jesse. The new ruler nonetheless allowed Catholicos Domentius IV to remain in Kartli and coexist with the regime. The family took refuge in Racha under the protection of Zurab Abashidze, while Jesse dispatched a Persian emissary to locate them. Acting under Persian orders, the envoy pretended to be unable to find Vakhtang’s family: despite Jesse’s pro-Persian stance, Persia preferred to maintain instability in Georgia rather than strengthen the authority of the new king.

Toward the end of 1714, Bakar, his brothers, and their mother arrived at the court of George VI of Imereti. Upon learning this, Jesse attempted to negotiate their capture, offering the Imeretian king the return of his wife Rodam—then in exile in Tbilisi—in exchange for the fugitives. In a calculated diplomatic maneuver, George VI secured Rodam’s return while continuing to protect the exiled family.

In Kartli, Jesse rapidly became deeply unpopular, and many nobles united to initiate a civil war, accusing the king of usurpation. Shah Soltan Hoseyn likewise abandoned him: instead of providing military assistance, he limited his support to sending gifts in order to preserve Jesse’s formal allegiance. Finally, after repeated petitions from the Kartlian nobility, Persia agreed to depose Jesse.

== Regent ==
=== Domestic policy ===
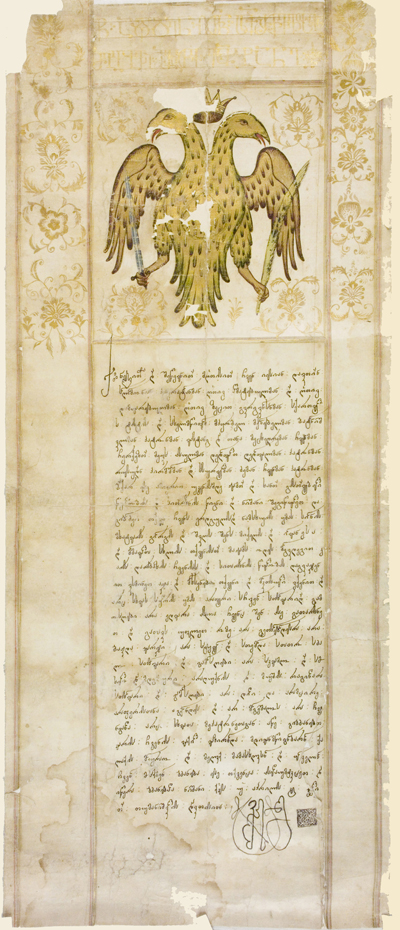
Royal decree signed by Vakhtang VI and Bakar.

On 1 June 1716, Vakhtang, still in Isfahan, agreed to convert to Islam and was recognized as King of Kartli under the name Vakhtang VI. However, as commander-in-chief of the Persian armed forces and governor of Tabriz, he was required to remain at the court of Shah Soltan Hoseyn. The shah nevertheless deposed Jesse and decided to appoint the young Bakar as janishin (“lieutenant”) of the kingdom. With Tbilisi devastated by an outbreak of bubonic plague, Bakar landed at Mtskheta on 17 September. On 1 August 1717, he was formally installed by Persia during a ceremony at Kojori, near Tbilisi, during which he converted to Islam, assumed the name Shah Navaz Khan III, and received from the Persian ambassador a crown, a golden insignia, and a robe of honor. He was also granted the titles of commander-in-chief and governor-general of Azerbaijan.

Bakar’s first task was the capture of Jesse, who initially took refuge in the forests of eastern Georgia before receiving the protection of David II of Kakheti while being pursued by a Persian military mission. Using his connections in Isfahan, Bakar informed Vakhtang VI of the situation, prompting the latter to request the intervention of Shah Soltan Hoseyn. The shah sent an embassy to David II, forcing him to reach an accommodation with Tbilisi. Bakar then had his uncle arrested and confined to a palace in the capital. Shortly thereafter, he also ordered the arrest of the general Luarsab, Jesse’s principal lieutenant during his reign of terror, and presented him as a prisoner to his mother, Queen Rusudan.

Bakar proved a loyal ally of Persia, encouraging the Safavid Empire not to hasten Vakhtang’s return. Nevertheless, father and son remained in constant communication, and Bakar frequently acted on his father’s instructions. He launched campaigns against leading nobles deemed disloyal: Heraclius II, Prince of Mukhrani was arrested and blinded, and his principality was transferred to his nephew Levan. Papuna Diasamidze was strangled in his sleep, while many other nobles were executed or sent into exile. In 1717, Bakar dismissed Datuna, duke of Ksani, who was then serving as minister of the palace, and replaced him with Edisher Tsitsishvili. Datuna rebelled in his domains, prompting the janishin to send his brother Vakhushti to invade Ksani. Datuna died during the conflict, and his son Shanshe fled to Persia, where Vakhtang VI persuaded Shah Soltan Hoseyn to arrest him and return him to Bakar, who imprisoned him in Tbilisi.

Bakar also resumed the cultural policies of his father, interrupted under Jesse, and became a patron of the printing house of Mikheil Stephaneshvili. Under his protection, a brief Georgian cultural revival saw the publication of numerous religious works, including the Psalms of David, a prayer book, and a second edition of the Book of Hours in Georgian. A measure of political autonomy and economic stability further enabled Bakar to mint the first Georgian coinage since the 13th century.

=== External problems ===
Despite the support of Bakar and his Persian allies, the prince faced a growing number of external challenges on the borders of Kartli, partly encouraged by the supporters of Jesse. In particular, in Kakheti, King David II accused his vizier Qiassa of spying for Tbilisi and had him imprisoned in Pankisi, before a Kartlian mission secured his release. Qiassa’s subsequent settlement in Tbilisi and Bakar’s gift of a palace to the disgraced minister further aggravated relations between the two Georgian kingdoms, a tension that caused concern among Persian envoys. Only the return of Vakhtang VI to his throne succeeded in restoring calm between Kartli and Kakheti.

In the summer of 1717, an army of 7,000 Lezgins from Jar-Balakan crossed Kakheti and devastated the town of Bolnisi and the villages of the Ktsia valley. Bakar sent his uncle Simon with 300 cavalrymen in pursuit, but despite their superior military experience, they were defeated at the battle of Nazara and chased as far as Marneuli. Lezgin raids became routine and abated only during the height of the summer heat. When the Lezgins began to leave Kartli and attack Iranian territories, Isfahan decided to send Vakhtang VI back to Georgia to defeat them.

In August 1719, Vakhtang VI returned to Kartli. Bakar welcomed him with a military, noble, and religious procession at the frontier town of Lori, accompanied by Catholicos Domentius IV. The historian Sekhnia Chkheidze, an eyewitness to the events, describes the warm embrace between father and son, their return to Tbilisi, and the coronation of Vakhtang VI at Mtskheta.

== Under Vakhtang VI ==
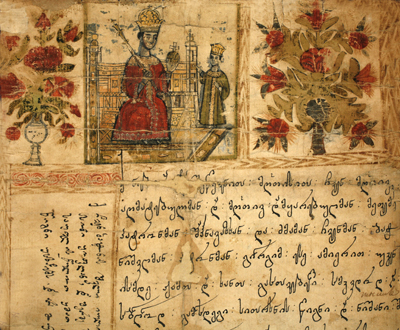
Bakar with his young brother George.

Under the reign of Vakhtang VI, Bakar became a close deputy of his father. In 1720 (or 1719, according to Nikoloz Berdzenishvili), the king dispatched Bakar and Vakhushti to confront Duke Shanshe of Ksani, who had just escaped from his imprisonment in Tbilisi. During the campaign, Bakar was responsible for the eastern front and inflicted a defeat on Shanshe, who entrenched himself at Churta before being finally overcome when the king called upon troops from Racha. The duke surrendered to Bakar, who had him imprisoned in Imereti. (Note: Shanshe escaped from prison and rebelled again some time later. Despite this, he became a close ally of Vakhtang in the years that followed, when Tbilisi found itself at the mercy of the Ottomans and Persians.)

Soon afterwards, Vakhtang undertook a major shift in his foreign policy when Persia refused to assist him against the Lezgins. At the same time, the Russian Empire stood at the gates of the Caucasus, preparing for a southward expansion, while Afghanistan invaded Persia, severely weakening Safavid power and killing Rostom Khan—Vakhtang’s brother and commander-in-chief of the Persian armed forces—at the Battle of Gulnabad on 8 March 1722. Within days, the Afghans laid siege to Isfahan, and Shah Soltan Hoseyn, in desperation, appealed for the support of Kartli and appointed Bakar qollar-aghassi, or commander of the imperial guard, to replace Rostom Khan. (Note: This office has traditionally been held by Georgians since the 16th century.)

In his new position, Bakar—later described by Vakhushti as “a man of great intellect and a friend of the Persians”—assembled an army of 3,000 to 4,000 Georgians and marched toward Isfahan. This development alarmed the Afghans, as the Georgians then enjoyed a reputation as agile and formidable soldiers, and Emir Mahmud Hotak was forced to confront a mutiny within his own ranks. Ange de Gardane, the French ambassador to Persia, reported at the time:

“Some claim that the prince of Georgia [Vakhtang VI] is sending his son [Bakar] here at the head of 12,000 Georgians. This, my lord, is the true way to restore the affairs of this kingdom and to compel Mahmud to withdraw; otherwise, he runs great risks against the Georgian troops.”

Tbilisi in 1717.

In May, Bakar reached Syunik, but a change in his father’s policy altered his plans. In Tbilisi, Persian envoys reported the arrival of Russian representatives, while Emperor Peter the Great was preparing to enter into war against Iran. Vakhtang VI promptly sent Queen Rusudan and Anna Sidamoni, Bakar’s wife, to intercept the prince and demand his return to Georgia. Isfahan remained under siege, (Note: Mahmud Hotak captured the Persian capital in October 1722, leading to the fall of the Safavid Empire.) and Russia declared war on the weakened Persian state in July.

Bakar and the royal adviser Sulkhan-Saba Orbeliani strongly opposed a Russo–Georgian alliance, fearing the imperial ambitions of Peter the Great. Nevertheless, the tsar captured Derbent in August and summoned Vakhtang VI to Ganja in order to secure the region ahead of the southward advance of Russian forces. Vakhtang and Bakar departed together on 20 August, arrived in September, and began expelling the Lezgins from the area while uniting the Christian communities of Shirvan and Karabakh. Father and son remained there for three months, before learning of the sudden withdrawal of Russian troops.

During their stay in Ganja, Isfahan fell to the Afghans on 23 October, and the Georgians dispatched the ambassador Sekhnia Chkheidze to Tahmasp, the son of Shah Soltan Hoseyn, who was then in flight at Qazvin. In November, Tahmasp sent gifts to Vakhtang and requested military assistance from Bakar, but following the king’s refusal, both men returned to Georgia. On 22 November 1722, they were back in Tbilisi. (Note: W.E.D. Allen assumes that Bakar had already returned in September, an unlikely theory considering the Persian embassy to Bakar in Ganja in October.)

=== War for Tbilisi ===
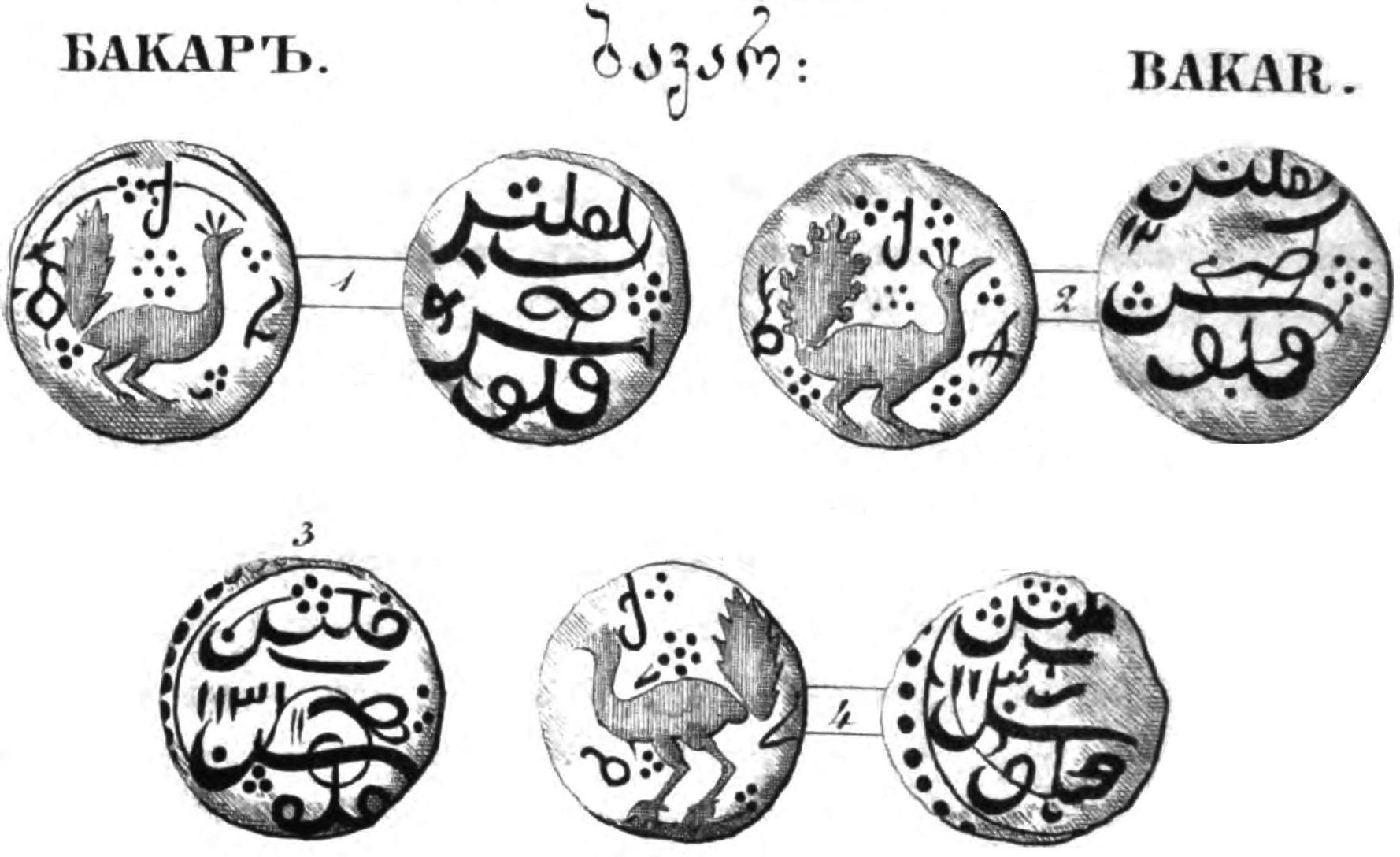
Coins of Bakar.

In December, Tahmasp, who governed the Safavid domains while Shah Soltan Hoseyn was imprisoned by the Afghans, issued an ultimatum to the Georgian royal family. He demanded that Vakhtang VI convene the tribal leaders of Azerbaijan in order to retake Shirvan from the Russians, and that Bakar—who still held the title of qollar-aghassi—march on Isfahan “with as many Georgian troops as possible”. Vakhtang refused to jeopardize his newly formed and fragile alliance with Russia. In response, Tahmasp ordered his vassal Constantine II of Kakheti to attack Kartli. Before the end of 1722, Constantine reached Lilo, a village near Tbilisi. In retaliation, Bakar and his uncle Jesse (Note: Jesse was released from prison some time earlier.) mustered troops at Mtskheta and devastated the Kakhetian province of Saguramo.

In Kakheti, the forces of Bakar and Jesse were reinforced by those of Prince Teimuraz, Constantine’s anti-Persian half-brother. The three then returned together to Tbilisi, where Teimuraz swore allegiance to Vakhtang VI. In January 1723, Tahmasp announced the deposition of Vakhtang VI and recognized Constantine II as the sole governor of Georgia. At the same time, he ordered the Persian garrison stationed in Tbilisi (Note: A Persian garrison has been operating in the capital since the 1630s and is often the cause of instability in Georgian internal affairs.) to open fire on the royal palace. Constantine arrived simultaneously at the gates of the capital, initiating a five-month battle within the city.

At the head of the royalist forces, Bakar commanded an army reinforced by a coalition from western Georgia, including Alexander V of Imereti, Shoshita of Racha, and Simon Abashidze. (Note: Western Georgia was then firmly allied with the Ottoman Empire, a historical enemy of Safavid Persia.) Constantine II, by contrast, was supported by Muslim troops from Ganja and Erevan, as well as Lezgin militias. During the first days of the fighting, clashes were concentrated in the Cliff Quarter, (Note: Kldis Oubani, currently in the heart of Tbilisi and an influential neighbourhood close to the royal estates in the 18th century.) which changed hands repeatedly before being decisively captured by Bakar. Constantine II then established a strong position at Avlabari, a hill several kilometers from the center of Tbilisi.

Despite Bakar’s successes in Tbilisi, the invaders ravaged the rest of the kingdom. The governor of Ganja sent his troops into Georgian Armenia (Somkhiti), forcing Vakhushti to leave his brother in order to defend the province’s agricultural heartland. After securing the region, Vakhushti captured Mtskheta, which served as Constantine II’s base of operations, seized several military commanders, and enabled Bakar to retake Mount Tabori, a strategic position, during a night assault. These successive defeats compelled Constantine II to concentrate his mountain and Lezgin mercenaries for a final attempt to seize the capital. However, Bakar inflicted a bloody defeat on him on the banks of the Mtkvari River with the help of Imeretian reinforcements. Constantine fled, and Bakar was prevented from pursuing him by his advisers because of the exhausted state of his troops.

=== Royal Guerrilla Warfare ===
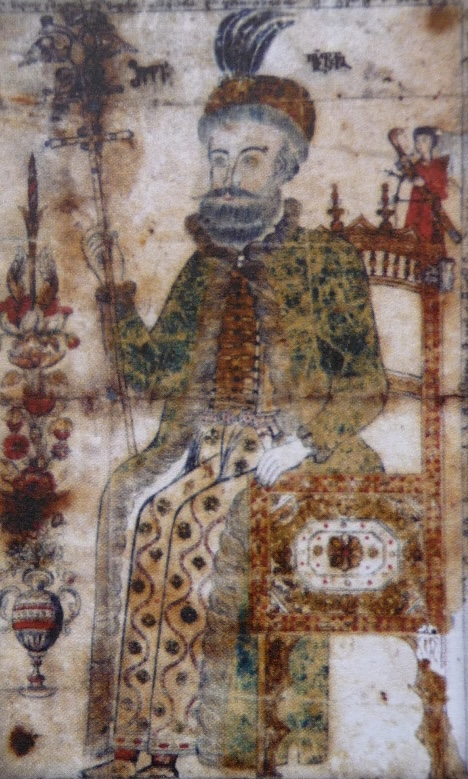
Vakhtang VI.

For several days, Constantine evaded repeated attempts by Bakar to capture him. On 7 May 1723, he returned to the gates of Tbilisi, this time with nearly 7,000 Lezgin mercenaries, while the forces of Vakhtang VI were weakened. On 8 May, the royal family abandoned the capital, and Constantine II sacked the city, burning numerous churches and looting residential quarters. Vakhtang and Bakar first withdrew to Mtskheta before separating: the king went to Gori, while Bakar sought military assistance from his father-in-law, Duke George of Aragvi, at Dusheti, but was refused.

After rejoining their father at Gori, Bakar and Vakhushti campaigned in Satsitsiano, in central Kartli, but were forced to retreat after suffering another defeat at the hands of Constantine II. Vakhtang appealed for Russian intervention, as Russian forces were then engaged in warfare along the Caspian Sea, but, receiving no response, he turned instead to the third major regional power, the Ottoman Empire. During the first week of June 1723, Bakar and Jesse met the Ottoman serasker Ibrahim at the village of Poka to negotiate the recapture of Tbilisi. The talks initially collapsed when it emerged that the Ottomans were also in contact with Constantine. However, Bakar was compelled to return to the negotiating table after a final appeal to Russia again went unanswered.

On 12 June, (Note: Joseph von Hammer-Purgstall mistakenly dates the capture of Tbilisi to 10 July.) a substantial Ottoman force, supported by Georgian troops under the command of one of Bakar’s brothers, (Note: A certain Gushtasp in Turkish sources. Bakar then has two brothers: Vakhushti and George. Marie-Félicité Brosset assumes that Gushtasp is the Turkish name for one or the other.) captured Tbilisi with little resistance. On the same day, Vakhtang, Bakar, and Simon Abashidze entered the capital.

=== Bakar in Power ===
Upon the capture of Tbilisi, the Ottomans betrayed the royal family and imprisoned not only Constantine of Kakheti, but also Bakar and Jesse, demanding payment in exchange for the throne. Constantine offered the serasker Ibrahim “300 purses” as well as the cities of Ganja and Erevan to the Ottoman Empire, but Vakhtang secured his son’s release with twelve mules laden with gold, silver, and jewelry. On 13 June, Bakar was placed on the throne of Kartli under the new name Ibrahim Pasha. (Note: The royal documents signed by Bakar until 1724 bear the name of Shah Navaz Khan III, his royal name given to him by Persia in 1719.) A council composed of the pashas Köprülü Abdullah of Erzurum and Ishaq Jaqeli of Childir, together with the governor of Kars, granted Bakar “the administration of all Georgia”. (Note: Bakar actually controlled Kartli and Kakheti under Turkish protection, unifying these two states in eastern Georgia. Western Georgia remained divided into five independent or autonomous states.) Vakhtang nevertheless continued to be recognized as king by the high nobility and retained considerable influence over his son’s decisions, while residing in Tskhinvali until his eventual exile.

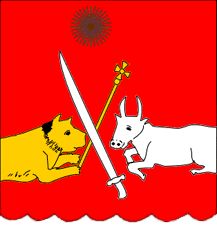
Seal of Kartli under Bakar.

Forced to wear Ottoman dress in his palace, Bakar moved swiftly to consolidate his authority. Constantine was imprisoned on the day of Bakar’s accession, and the Persian garrison of Tbilisi was executed by Ottoman janissaries. However, Bakar was obliged to accept the payment of an annual tribute of 4,000 piastres to Ottomans, and the serasker Ibrahim imposed a reign of terror on the Christian population of the capital with his force of 40,000 soldiers. Exploiting divisions among the Kartlian nobility, the Ottomans compelled Bakar to employ brutal measures to secure control. Numerous nobles were executed, including his father-in-law, George of Aragvi, who was beheaded during a hunting with Bakar. Ishaq Jaqeli, pasha of Childir, forced Bakar to provide troops for his conquest of Ganja, in return for which he settled a dispute between the crown and the noble Chkheidze family. Vakhtang, for his part, was compelled to suppress the anti-Ottoman rebellion of Shanshe of Ksani by employing Lezgin mercenaries, (Note: The use of Lezgins was a practice rarely employed by Georgian kings to settle internal conflicts, due to the violence of these mercenaries and their questionable loyalty.) who subsequently mutinied and ravaged Kartli.

In September 1723, Bakar came to regret his alliance with Ottomans and entered into negotiations with his former enemy, Constantine II. He secured Constantine’s release for the price of 200 purses and allowed him to resume his throne at Telavi through a clandestine arrangement that was officially presented as Constantine’s escape from his Tbilisi prison. When Constantine massacred a Turkish garrison that was ravaging Kakheti toward the end of 1723, Ottomans invaded his kingdom, forcing him to take refuge in the forests, and appointed Jesse as governor of the region, while annexing the provinces of Borchalo and Qazakh to Bakar’s domains. In January 1724, Constantine sent his brother Teimuraz to negotiate secretly with Bakar in Tbilisi, and a few days later the two kings met at Mtskheta, from which point they formed an anti-Ottoman alliance.

=== Deposed King ===
Bakar and Constantine hoped to enlist the support of neighboring powers in their effort to liberate Georgia from Ottoman rule. Their alliance envisaged the backing of Tahmasp and Peter the Great, but these expectations were disappointed: the Safavids were themselves preoccupied with continuing wars against the Afghans, while Russia had no intention of entering into war with the Ottoman Empire. The Treaty of Constantinople of 24 July 1724 between the Ottomans and Russia formally confirmed the abandonment of Georgia to Ottoman control. Nevertheless, the departure of the serasker Ibrahim in September 1723 offered Bakar a measure of hope, as the imposing Ottoman force of 40,000 soldiers was reduced to a garrison of only 4,000–5,000 men, while Bakar enlisted loyal followers from Karabakh and Ganja to protect him.

In the spring of 1724, Bakar left Tbilisi and launched an anti-Ottoman guerrilla campaign together with Constantine and Teimuraz. Vakhtang VI, for his part, attempted to negotiate with the Ottoman authorities and even offered to capture his own son in exchange for the throne. However, the massacre of 500 Ottomans by Bakar at Poka prompted the occupiers to depose the prince. Bakar was soon reinforced by Shanshe of Ksani, and together they retook Mukhrani, expelling the Lezgins who were then ravaging the province. Bakar subsequently joined his father at Ali before marching on Mtskheta, where the forces of Jesse and Constantine II assembled to form a Georgian army with the aim of retaking Tiflis. This plan failed, however, when Jesse abandoned the siege after being bribed by the Ottomans, who appointed him king of Kartli and forced Vakhtang, Bakar, and Constantine to withdraw toward Gori.

Jesse, now at the head of Ottoman forces, attacked Bakar at the village of Goristavi. Defeated, the prince took refuge at Ateni, while the Ottomans conquered the province of Sabaratiano. When Jesse pursued him further, Bakar fled into the Caucasus Mountains. Ottoman troops then devastated the provinces of Mukhrani and Samilakhoro, burned Tskhinvali, and returned to Tbilisi.

Under unclear circumstances, Bakar briefly managed to re-establish himself in the capital, from where he entered into contact with Russian envoys who offered exile in Russia to the royal family. In a letter to the ambassadors, Bakar accepted this proposal:

“We have understood what your envoy has told us; a messenger has come to you from the great Emperor. Since you are devoted to that monarch, as well as to me, you must know what good treatment and services are fitting toward him.”

In June 1724, Bakar left Tbilisi for the last time. He joined Vakhtang VI and his family at Tskhinvali, from where they departed together for Racha, accompanied by a retinue of between 1,200 and 1,400 Georgians. Refusing to submit to Constantine, the dukes of Aragvi and Ksani made a final appeal to Vakhtang to leave Bakar behind to lead the Georgian resistance. (Note: Constantine continued to lead a small anti-Turkish resistance but accepted Ottoman suzerainty in 1725.) On 15 July, the royal family and their entourage crossed the Russian frontier and went into exile. Bakar would never return to Georgia.

== Exile ==
=== Toward Moscow ===
Bakar and his wife Anna were accompanied on their journey by a personal retinue of 254 servants and minor nobles. The exiles first stopped at Digor, the chief settlement of the Ossetian tribes, where they were received by the brothers-in-law of Vakhtang VI, who at the time governed the Circassian provinces. In Circassia, they were escorted by the Russian army to the fortress of Solakh, built by Peter the Great, where the Georgian party remained for several weeks from 28 August 1724. They left the fortress in October and reached Astrakhan on 8 November, where they spent the region’s harsh winter. At the beginning of 1725, Peter the Great summoned the royal family to Saint Petersburg, but Vakhtang and Bakar learned of the emperor’s death when they arrived in Tsaritsyn on 13 February. Two days later, the Georgian entourage resumed its journey toward its final destination, Moscow.

Upon their arrival in Moscow on 10 March, the royal family was welcomed by Princess Darejan, a cousin of the deposed king who had been living in exile in Russia since 1684. Their ceremonial entry into the imperial city is described in detail by contemporary Russian historians: from the Danilov Monastery on the outskirts of the city, two carriages conveyed the royal family, with Bakar and his uncle Simon riding in the second carriage. The Georgian procession crossed the Stone Bridge and passed through the Voskresensky Gate before finally reaching their residences on Nikolskaya Street, a central Moscow thoroughfare that would become a focal point of Georgian cultural life for decades.

Peter the Great had originally intended to use the newly arrived and numerous Georgian community in support of an assertive Russian policy in the Caucasus. However, the sudden rise of Catherine I altered the empire’s foreign policy, and the governments of Catherine (1725–1727), Peter II (1727–1730), and Anna (1730–1740) instead chose to enrich the Georgian royal family and firmly integrate it into Russian society. Empress Anna appointed Bakar lieutenant general of the Russian artillery, a rank he retained under the reign of Elizabeth. He was also made a knight of the Order of Saint Alexander Nevsky on 24 May 1734 and of the Order of Saint Andrew on 30 November 1742.

=== Looking Southward ===
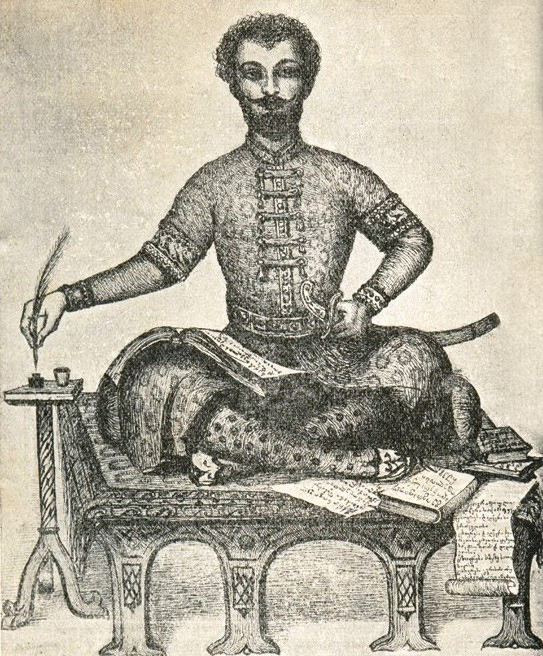
Prince Vakhushti, half-brother of Bakar.

At the beginning of their exile, Vakhtang and Bakar sought to persuade Emperor Peter II to support their return to Georgia at the head of a Russian army in order to regain control of the country. The Russian government, however, was unwilling to commit troops to a military venture that lay outside Russia’s strategic objectives, and Peter II advised Vakhtang to wait for “a divine sign”. In reality, Russian control of the Caspian Sea littoral, acquired during the conflict of 1722–1723, remained fragile, and Peter was reluctant to jeopardize his alliance with Persia by launching an invasion. This policy was also reflected in Russia’s refusal to intervene on behalf of Alexander V of Imereti against the Ottomans.

In 1734, Bakar and Count Andrey Osterman, the Russian minister of foreign affairs, supported a plan to assist King Teimuraz II of Kakheti against Persia. In a letter to Empress Anna, Bakar requested that aid be sent to Georgia “with gunpowder, lead, and money”, but Saint Petersburg declined the proposal.

On 1 May 1734, Anna signed a decree authorizing Vakhtang and Bakar to travel toward Georgia, but they reached Astrakhan on 26 September without Russian military support. By 10 October, they were in Derbent, where they took part in negotiations over a border agreement between Russia and Persia, after having carried out a rapid but unsuccessful raid on Shamakhi. Saint Petersburg then chose to await the outcome of the Georgian campaign in Dagestan before deciding the future of Kartli. Following a defeat at Shamakhi by Nader Shah, however, the Russians entered into negotiations with him. On 10 March 1735, the Treaty of Ganja was concluded between Russia and Persia, recognizing Persian suzerainty over South Caucasus.

The Treaty of Ganja also recognized Vakhtang VI as the legitimate king of Kartli, but Nader Shah agreed to restore him to the throne only after a personal meeting. Vakhtang remained in Astrakhan and refused to travel to Persia, while Bakar, as a Russian lieutenant general, was not permitted to take part in a diplomatic mission without the empress’s consent. Father and son were deeply divided on the issue, but Vakhtang held to his position, unwilling to return to Georgia as a Persian vassal. In 1736, Bakar returned to Moscow, leaving his father in Astrakhan.

The Georgian nobility continued to urge Vakhtang to allow Bakar to assume the Georgian throne under the joint protection of Russia and Persia, in order to lead an anti-Ottoman coalition, but Vakhtang refused. In 1736, Shanshe of Ksani sent a letter to the former king, asking him to authorize Bakar’s return and “not to abandon the country entirely”. In 1737, Shanshe himself went into exile in Russia and requested permission from the Russian government to return to Georgia with Bakar and a Russian army, but these requests were rejected. Vakhtang VI died in Astrakhan on 26 March 1737.

=== Final years ===
Upon his father’s death, Bakar became a claimant to the throne of Kartli. In 1738, the French cartographer Jean-François Delisle referred to him as mepe (the Georgian word for “king”), and he is likewise designated in contemporary Russian sources; however, there is no indication that the Russian government formally recognized him as the legitimate monarch of Georgia. Bakar nonetheless came close to achieving his goal of recovering the Georgian crown in 1741, when Nader Shah invaded Dagestan.

Saint Petersburg officially maintained a position of neutrality, but feared the landing of more than 100,000 Persian troops along the empire’s borders and concentrated forces at Kizlyar. Bakar was dispatched by the Russian government to negotiate with the Lezgins, who were then seeking Russian assistance against Persia, and he arrived in Astrakhan. He concluded a Russo-Lezgin alliance under which Russian military protection was granted in exchange for the participation of 60,000 Lezgins in support of Russian interests in the Caucasus. This agreement, followed by a series of Persian defeats, compelled Nader Shah to withdraw toward Georgia.

In 1742, while still in Astrakhan, Bakar met a Georgian delegation led by Badzim Amilakhvari, a cousin of Givi Amilakhvari, the Persian-appointed governor of Georgia. Givi intended to revolt against Nader Shah, on the condition that Bakar return. In the same year, Amilakhvari rose in rebellion against Persia, but was quickly defeated when Russia refused to provide assistance. In 1744, Nader Shah proclaimed Tamar II, Bakar’s sister, queen of Kartli in order to legitimize his control over Georgia, and Russia ordered Bakar to return to Saint Petersburg, where he submitted a report before returning to Moscow.

Bakar and his family were strongly opposed to the rule of Teimuraz II, the husband of Tamar II, who had been installed by Persia to govern eastern Georgia. In 1744, Givi Amilakhvari made a final appeal for the prince’s return, before turning to the Ottomans when Bakar left the request unanswered. In 1747, Abdullah Beg, a cousin of Bakar, was selected as the candidate of the Georgian anti-Persian opposition, effectively bringing Bakar’s political claims to an end.

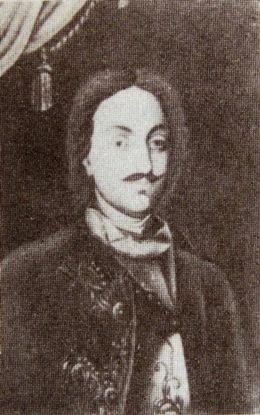
Aleksandr Bakarovich Gruzinsky, son and heir of Bakar

Under Bakar’s leadership, the Georgian colony in Moscow became an influential center of Georgian culture. Empress Elizabeth granted him the village of Voskresenskoye, near Moscow, where he and his brother Vakhushti established a printing press that played a major role in the Georgian cultural revival of the 18th century. With Bakar’s financial support, the press published around ten works, including the first Georgian Bible in 1742–1743, known as the “Bible of Bakar”. After Bakar’s death, the printing press was transferred to Moscow. In 1737, he also collaborated with the French cartographer Joseph-Nicolas Delisle on the translation of maps of Georgia drawn by Vakhushti. A patron of the Orthodox Church, Bakar donated a crystal to Moscow’s Church of St. Nicholas of the Weavers.

Bakar died of illness on 1 February 1750 in Moscow. He was buried at the Donskoy Monastery.

== Family ==
Bakar was married to Ana (1706 – 18 February 1780), daughter of George, Duke of Aragvi. She accompanied Bakar into exile in Russia, where she died in Moscow and was buried at the Donskoy Monastery alongside her husband. Bakar’s descendants adopted the Russian surname Gruzinsky (“of Georgia”). The couple had five children:

- An unnamed daughter, who married Shiosh Sachinoshvili (Baratashvili);
- Prince Alexander (1726–1791), a claimant to the Georgian throne in opposition to Heraclius II;
- Prince Levan (1728–1763), a Russian military officer;
- Princess Elisabeth (died 1768), who married Nikolai Ivanovich Odoevsky (died 1798);
- Princess Mariam (died 1807).

== Bibliography ==
- Académie impériale des sciences de Saint-Pétersbourg (1838), Bulletin scientifique, vol. 4, Saint-Pétersbourg: Imprimerie de l'Académie impériale des sciences
- Allen, W.E.D. (1932). A History of the Georgian People. London: Routledge & Keagan Paul.
- Asatiani, Nodar (2001). Საქართველოს ისტორია [History of Georgia] (in Georgian). Tbilisi: Sakartvelos Matsne.
- Asatiani, Nodar; Janelidze, Otar (2009). History of Georgia. Tbilisi: Publishing House Petite. ISBN 978-9941906367.
- Berdzenishvili, Nikoloz (1965). Საქართველოს ისტორიის საკითხები VI [Questions on the History of Georgia, Volume 2] (in Georgian). Tbilisi: Metsniereba.
- Berdzenishvili, Nikoloz (1967). Საქართველოს ისტორიის საკითხები VI [Questions on the History of Georgia, Volume 4] (in Georgian). Tbilisi: Metsniereba.
- Brosset, Marie-Félicité (1858). Histoire moderne de la Géorgie. Saint Petersburg: Imperial Academy of Sciences. p. 668.
- Isarloff, Raphaël (1900). Histoire de Géorgie. Paris: Librairie de Charles Noblet. p. 112.
- Lang, David Marshall (1957). The Last Years of Georgian Monarchy. New York: Columbia University Press.
- Long, George, ed. (1843). "Vakhusta". The Penny Cyclopaedia of the Society for the Diffusion of Useful Knowledge. Vol. 25. London: Charles Knight & Co.
- Metreveli, Roin; et al. (1998). Ქართული დიპლომატიის ისტორიის ნარკვევები [Essays on the history of diplomacy] (in Georgian). Tbilisi: Université d'État de Tbilissi Ivané Djavakhichvili. ISBN 5-511-00896-6.
- Rayfield, Donald (2012). Edge of Empires: A History of Georgia. London: Reaktion Books. ISBN 978-1-78023-070-2.
- Salia, Kalistrat (1980). Histoire de la nation géorgienne [History of the Georgian nation] (in French). Paris: Nino Salia.
- Shoshitashvili, Nodar (2015). "ვახტანგ VI [Vakhtang VI]". საქართველოს ილუსტრირებული ისტორია [Illustrated History of Georgia] (in Georgian). Vol. 5. Tbilisi: Palitra L. ISBN 978-9941-21-754-8.
- Toumanoff, Cyril (1976). Manuel de Généalogie et de Chronologie pour l'histoire de la Caucasie chrétienne (Arménie, Géorgie, Albanie) [Manual of Genealogy and Chronology of Christian Caucasian History (Armenia, Georgia, Albania)] (in French). Rome: Edizioni Aquila.
- Lordkipanidze, Mariam; Metreveli, Roin (2000). Sakʻartʻvelos mepʻeebi (in Georgian). Tbilisi: Nekeri. ISBN 9992858362.

Preceded by Ahmad Agha	Commander of the gholam corps (qollar-aghasi); 1722	Succeeded by Mohammad Ali Khan
