= Ana Gruzinskaya Dadianova =

Ana Gruzinskaya Dadianova (Russian: Ана Грузинская Дадианова; 1723 – 19 March 1780), was a Russian aristocrat of Georgian royal origin and wife of Prince Pyotr Igorovich Dadianov.

== Bio ==
Ana was born in 1723 and was probably a daughter of Prince Alexander of Kartli, an illegitimate son of Jesse of Kartli. She married Prince Pyotr Igorovich Dadianov (15 June 1716 – 7 December 1784), a captain in the Imperial Russian Army and a member of the Georgian noble family of Dadiani. They had five children: Ekaterina (1743–1769), Anna (1746–1803), Olga (1750–1820), Elisaveta (1750–1814), and Alexander (1753–1811). Ana died on 19 March 1780 in Moscow.
