= Prince Adarnase of Kartli =

Georgian prince and military commander

- Born: Adarnese; 15 November 1707
- Died: 31 March 1784 (aged 76)
- Spouse: Ana Amilakhvari
- Issue: Anton; Varvara; Ana
Names
- Afanasy Bagration; Georgian: ათანასე ბაგრატიონი; Russian: Афанасий Леонович Багратион
- House: Mukhrani
- Dynasty: Bagrationi
- Father: Prince Levan of Kartli

Afanasy Bagration (Georgian: ათანასე ბაგრატიონი, romanized: atanase bagrat'ioni; Russian: Афанасий Леонович Багратион, romanized: Afanasiy Leonovich Bagration), born Adarnase (ადარნასე; 15 November 1707 – 31 March 1784), was a Georgian prince royal (batonishvili) of the Bagrationi dynasty of House of Mukhrani of Kartli and a natural son of Prince Levan of Kartli by a concubine. He followed, in 1724, his half-brother King Vakhtang VI into exile to the Russian Empire, where Afanasy pursued a military career and attained the rank of general poruchik.

== Career ==
Afanasy Bagration, born Adarnase, was a natural son of Prince Levan of Kartli. His early life in Kartli is poorly documented. In 1724, he arrived in Russia in the entourage of his half-brother Vakhtang VI, who had lost his throne to the Ottoman invasion. Adarnase, now known as Afanasy, joined the Imperial Russian Army and in succeeding years rose through the ranks. He was a colonel in the Viatsky Infantry Regiment and then a major-general in 1755. He carried out a variety of assignments during the Seven Years' War (1756–1763). He was decorated with the Order of Saint Anna in 1762 and promoted to general poruchik (an equivalent to lieutenant general) in 1763. From 1763 to 1764, Prince Bagration, filling the office of ober-commandant of Moscow, was in charge of a garrison of that city. He took part in the pacification of the Plague Riot in September 1771 and barely escaped from being stoned by the mob at the Kremlin. Prince Afanasy died in Moscow in 1784, aged 76. He was buried at the Donskoy Monastery in Moscow.

== Family and ancestry ==
Afanasy Bagration was married to Ana Amilakhvari (Anna Vasilyevna; 10 April 1720 – 6 March 1794), also a Georgian expatriate noblewoman, a daughter of Prince Vakhtang (Vasily) Amilakhvari (died 1739) by his wife, Princess Elene Orbeliani (fl. 1724–1769). Afanasy and Ana had three children—Anton, Varvara, and Ana.

Ancestors of Prince Adarnase of Kartli

16. Vakhtang I, Prince of Mukhrani
8. Teimuraz I, Prince of Mukhrani
4. Vakhtang V
18. Nugzar, Duke of Aragvi
9. Ana Eristavi
19. Dedisimedi N. or Mariam Cholokashvili
2. Prince Levan of Kartli
20. Orbel Baratashvili
10. Qaplan Baratashvili-Orbelishvili
5. Rodam Kaplanishvili-Orbeliani
22. N.N, Meskhian amilakhor
11. Tamar N.
1. Adarnase (Afanasy)
3. An unknown concubine
