= Prince Alexander of Kartli (died 1711) =

Alexander (Georgian: ალექსანდრე, romanized: aleksandre) or Eskandar-Mirza (Persian: اسکندرمیرزا) (c. 1688 – 27 September 1711) was a Georgian prince royal (batonishvili) of the Bagratid House of Mukhrani of Kartli. He was killed fighting in the Safavid Iranian ranks against the Afghan rebels.

== Biography ==
According to the 18th-century historian and Alexander's close relative Prince Vakhushti, Alexander was a son of Prince Luarsab, son of King Vakhtang V (Shah Navaz Khan). Alternatively, based on the account of Sekhnia Chkheidze, a contemporary historian and a companion of the Georgian royals to Iran, Alexander is considered by the historians Marie-Félicité Brosset and Cyril Toumanoff to have been a son of Prince Levan (Shah Quli Khan), Vakhtang V's another son.

At that time, the Kingdom of Kartli was under the Safavid vassalage and several Georgian royals occupied important positions in the Iranian military. So did Alexander, who served as a lieutenant to his uncle George XI (Gurgin Khan), a commander-in-chief of the Safavid armies, first in Kerman and then in Afghanistan, where an anti-Iranian rebellion of the Pashtun and Baloch tribes was in progress. The rebel leader Mirwais Hotak capitalized on the absence of the Georgian troops under Alexander on a raid into a recalcitrant tribal area, murdered Gurgin Khan in Kandahar and took control of that city in April 1709. The detachment under Alexander was able to fight its way back to Iran through Khorasan. In 1711, the Safavid government dispatched yet another Georgian royal, Kaikhosro of Kartli (Kay Khusraw Khan), at the head of a new army, in which Alexander commanded a 2,000-strong Georgian contingent. This army besieged the rebels in Kandahar, but the Afghans resisted successfully. Alexander was killed during the siege and Kaikhosro fell on his disastrous retreat from Kandahar. The same fate would befall on another member of Alexander's family, Rostom (Rustam Khan), in 1722.
