= Prince Levan of Kartli =

Regent of Kartli

Regent of Kartli
- 1st regency: 1676–1677
- Monarch: George XI
- 2nd regency: 1703–1704
- Monarch: George XI
- Died: 30 May 1709
- Spouse: Tuta Gurieli (m. 1672; died 1678) Tinatin Avalishvili (m. 1680)
- Issue Among others: Kaikhosro of Kartli; Vakhtang VI; Catholicos-Patriarch Domentius IV; Jesse of Kartli; Prince Simon; Prince Adarnase (ill.); Prince Rostom (ill.); Prince Alexander? (ill.)
- Dynasty: Bagrationi
- Father: Vakhtang V
- Mother: Rodam Qaplanishvili
- Religion: Georgian Orthodox Church
- Khelrtva

Levan (Georgian: ლევანი, romanized: levani), also known by his Muslim name Shah-Qoli Khan (Persian: شاه قلی سلطان, romanized: Shāh Qolī Khān; died 30 May 1709) was a Georgian royal prince (batonishvili) and the fourth son of the king of Kartli Vakhtang V (Shah Navaz Khan).

== Biography ==
Levan was the fourth son of King Vakhtang V and his wife, Rodam Qaplanishvili. In 1675, Levan was confirmed as a janisin (regent) of Kartli during the absence of his reigning brother, George XI (Gurgin Khan), at the Persian military service in Afghanistan. Summoned to Isfahan in 1677, he had to accept Islam and take the name Shah-Qoli Khan. Thereafter he was appointed as naib of Kerman, Iran, and, as a commander of Georgian auxiliary forces, he secured the eastern provinces of the Persian empire from the rebellious Baluchi tribesmen from 1698 to 1701. For a short time in 1703, he was again a janisin for his absent brother in Kartli. As a reward for his military service, the Safavid shah Soltan Hoseyn made Levan, in 1703, a divanbeg (chief justice) of Persia, and his son, Khusrau Khan, darugha (i.e., prefect) of Isfahan.

During his governance in Kartli, he patronised Catholic missioners in the Caucasus. He also encouraged scholarly activities in Georgia, and helped his cousin, Sulkhan-Saba Orbeliani, to create a Georgian dictionary, which is still widely used in Georgia. Although officially a convert to Islam, Levan covertly remained Christian and composed the prayers to St John the Baptist, St Peter, St Paul and other Christian saints.

== Family ==
In 1672, Levan married Tuta (died 1678), daughter of Kaikhosro I Gurieli, Prince of Guria. They had three sons and one daughter:

- Kaikhosro of Kartli (1674–1711), a prominent military commander and prefect of police in Isfahan. He was appointed King of Kartli (r. 1709–1711) but was killed during the Battle of Kandahar in 1711;
- Vakhtang VI (1675–1737), one of the most significant figures in Georgian history. He served as Regent of Kartli (1703–1714) and later as King of Kartli (r. 1716–1724). A renowned legislator, scholar, and founder of the first Georgian printing press, he went into exile in Russia following the Ottoman invasion of 1724;
- Domentius IV (1677–1741), Catholicos-Patriarch of Georgia (1705–1724, 1739–1741);
- Princess Khvaramze (fl. 1710), who married Prince Sadzverel Chijavadze (died 1708).

In 1680, Levan married Tinatin (died 1708), daughter of Prince Giorgi Avalishvili. She had previously been married to Prince Iotam Palavankhosroshvili, with whom she had a son, Bezhan. Bezhan's daughter, Ana-Khanum, later became the third wife of King Teimuraz II. Tinatin and Levan had three sons:

- Jesse of Kartli (1682–1727), who accompanied his father to Persia, where he was raised at the Safavid court and served as a general. He later reigned twice as King of Kartli (r. 1714–1716, 1724–1727);
- Prince Simon (1683–1740), who served as regent of Kartli (1712–1714) during Vakhtang VI's absence at the Persian court;
- Prince Teimuraz (died 1710).

Levan also had several illegitimate children:

- Prince Adarnase (1707–1784), who accompanied Vakhtang VI to Russia in 1724. He entered the Imperial Russian Army, rose to the rank of major-general, and became ober-commandant of Moscow;
- Princess Khoreshan (fl. 1724);
- Prince Constantine (died 1756);
- Prince Rostom (died 1722), a general in the Safavid army;
- Prince David (fl. 1674–1703);
- Prince Toma (fl. 1688–1703);
- Prince Alexander (died 1711), a general in Safavid service, he is otherwise considered to have been a son of Levan's brother Luarsab.
