= Prince George of Kartli =

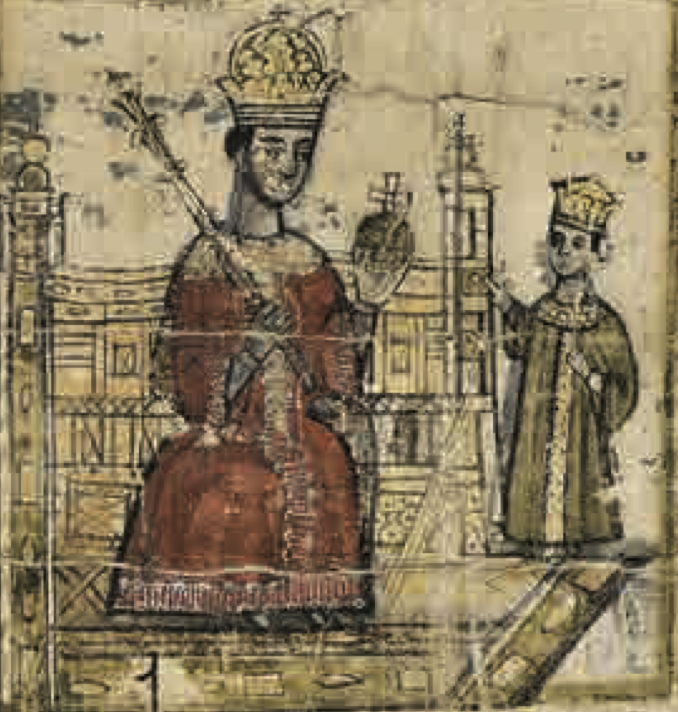
Prince George (right) standing next to his older brother, King Bakar of Kartli.

George, Prince of Georgia (Georgian: გიორგი ბატონიშვილი, romanized: giorgi bat'onishvili; Russian: царевич Георгий Вахтангович Грузинский, romanized: Tsarevich Georgi Vakhtangovich Gruzinsky; August 2, 1712 – December 19, 1786) was a Georgian royal prince and a general in the Russian service.

== Life ==
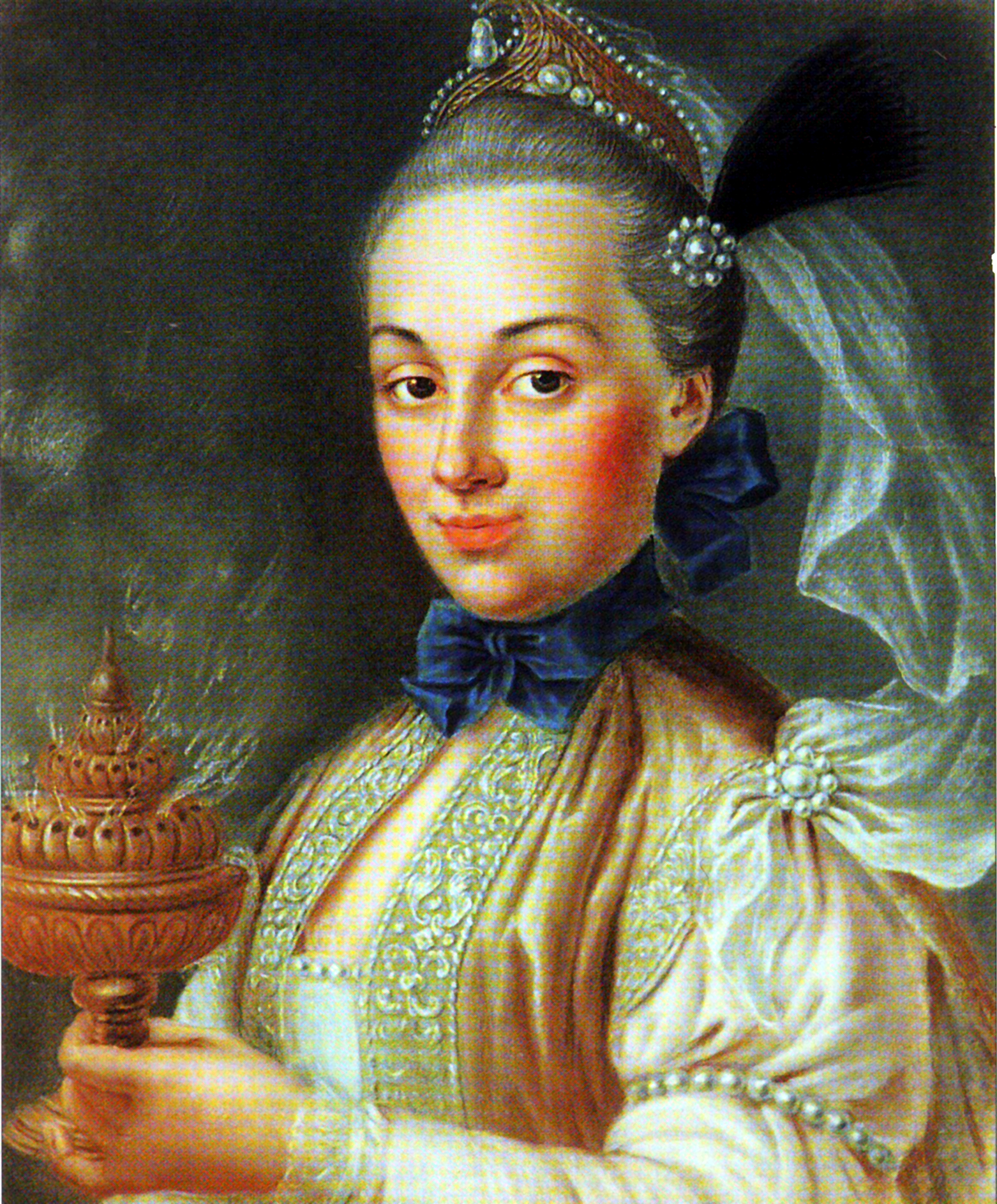
George's wife Maria, née princess Dolgorukova

Born to the king Vakhtang VI of the House of Bagrationi-Mukhrani and Queen Rusudan of Circassia, George followed his father into exile in Russia following the Ottoman occupation of Georgia in 1724. He established himself at Moscow and entered the Russian military service. During the Russo-Swedish War (1741–1743), he became a major general and commanded a squadron of galleys. He distinguished himself in the campaign of the Rhine during the War of the Austrian Succession (1740–1748) and was promoted to lieutenant general in 1750. He also fought early in the Seven Years' War (1756–1763) and retired in 1759 with the rank of general-in-chief.

The prince also engaged in cultural enterprises of the Georgian colony at Moscow whose head he became following the death of his brother Bakar (1750). Himself a poet of some talent, George sponsored literary and scholarly activities in both Georgia and Russia. In 1785, he donated 10,000 rubles to the Imperial University of Moscow. He died in Moscow in 1786 and was interred at the familial burial ground at the Donskoy Monastery.

== Marriage and issue ==
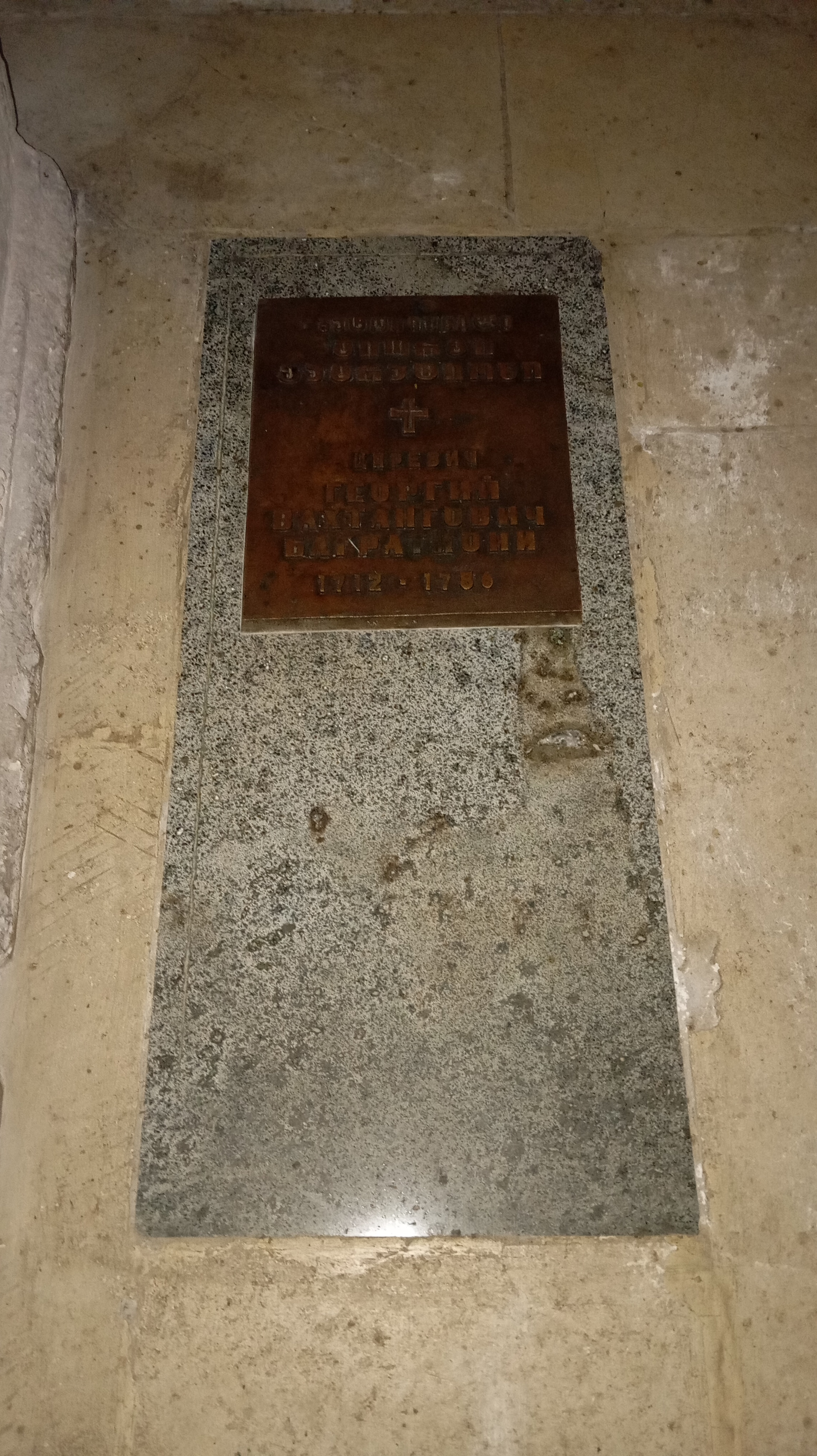
Tombstone of Prince George.

Prince George was married to Princess Maria Iakovna Dolgorukova by whom he had 3 children:

- Vasily (1749–1764)
- Jacob (1751–1768)
- Anna (1754–1779)

== See also ==
- Georgy Gruzinsky
