= Princess Tuta of Kartli =

Tuta (Georgian: თუთა) (1699–1746) was a Georgian royal princess (batonishvili) of the royal Bagrationi dynasty of House of Mukhrani.

She was a daughter of King Vakhtang VI of Kartli by his wife Rusudan of Circassia.

She married Prince Gedevan Eristavi of Racha but had no children.
