= Jesse of Kartli =

King of Kartli (r. 1714–1716, 1724–1727)

Jesse

King of Kartli
- 1st reign: 1714–1716
- Predecessor: Interregnum
- Successor: Vakhtang VI
- 2nd reign: 1724–1727
- Predecessor: Vakhtang VI
- Successor: Interregnum

Prince of Mukhrani
- Reign: 1721–1723
- Predecessor: Levan
- Successor: Interregnum
- Born: 1680/82
- Died: 3 March 1727
- Spouse: Mariam Qaplanishvili (m. 1714) Helen of Kakheti (m. 1715)
- Issue Among others: Anton I of Georgia; Abdullah Beg of Kartli (ill.); Prince Alexander ill.)
- Dynasty: Bagrationi
- Father: Prince Levan of Kartli
- Mother: Tinatin Avalishvili
- Religion: Georgian Orthodox Church, converted to Shia Islam, then Sunni Islam
- Khelrtva

Jesse (Georgian: იესე, romanized: iese; 1680/82 – 3 March 1727), also known by his Muslim names Ali-Quli Khan and Mustafa Pasha, of the Mukhranian Bagrationi dynasty, was a king (mepe) of Kartli (Georgia), acting actually as a Safavid Persian and later Ottoman viceroy (wali) from 1714 to 1716 and from 1724 until his death, respectively.

== Background ==
Jesse was a son of Prince Levan by his second wife, Princess Tinatin Avalishvili. Jesse accompanied his father during his service in Persia, where he was raised at the Safavid court, converted to Islam and took the name of Ali-Quli Khan. He held several high-ranking positions along the eastern frontiers of the empire and fought against the Afghan rebels from 1705 to 1714, under his uncle George XI and later his brother Kaikhosro. He was appointed as naib of Kerman (1708–1709), beylerbey of Kerman (1709–1711), and finally a tupchi-bashi (general in charge of artillery) of the Persian armies (1711–1714).

=== First reign ===
In March 1714, he was confirmed as wali (king) of Kartli in place of his brother Vakhtang VI, who had refused to convert to Islam. Upon ascending to the throne, Ali Quli-Khan allied with another Georgian ruler, David II of Kakheti (Imamquli-Khan), to repel the attacks from the marauding Dagestani clans but his own position was shattered by the internal opposition of the nobility. He proved to be incompetent and addicted to alcohol. Unable to maintain order in his possessions, he was replaced, in June 1716, by Shah Husayn with his brother Vakhtang, who had finally agreed to renounce Christianity.

=== Prison and conversions ===
Ali fled to Telavi, Kakheti, but was surrendered to Vakhtang's son Bakar, regent of Kartli. He was put under arrest at Tbilisi, where he reconverted to Christianity. Released in 1721 by Vakhtang VI, he was granted Mukhrani in possession and appointed mdivanbeg (chief justice) of Kartli. When Constantine II of Kakheti (Mahmad Quli-Khan) moved with a Persian army to remove Vakhtang from the position in 1723, Jesse defected to the approaching Ottoman army, became Sunni Muslim and was restored as king of Kartli under the name of Mustapha Pasha. His power, however, was largely nominal and the government was actually run by a Turkish commander. Mustapha remained loyal to the Sublime Porte when the Georgians staged an abortive uprising in 1724. However, the Ottomans abolished the kingdom of Kartli on his death in 1727, imposing their direct administrative rule.

== Family ==
In 1712, Jesse married Mariam (fl. 1712–1767), daughter of Prince Erasti Qaplanishvili-Orbeliani. She had previously been married to Jesse’s relative, Prince Kaikhosro Amirejibi, from whom Jesse took her as his wife despite opposition from the Church, declaring that the union was advantageous to him as a Muslim. They had one son:

- Prince George (fl. 1724–1762), who married Tamar Tsitsishvili; they had a son, Dimitri.

In 1715, Jesse married his second wife, Helen-Begum (1687–1750), daughter of Heraclius I of Kakheti. The marriage was celebrated according to both Christian and Muslim customs. Helen later retired to a monastery under the name Elizabeth. They had four sons and two daughters:

- Prince Ioane (died 1717);
- Prince Nikoloz;
- Prince David (fl. 1716–1738);
- Anton I of Georgia (born Teimuraz) (1720–1788), Catholicos-Patriarch of Georgia (1744–1755, 1764–1788);
- Princess Anastasia (died 1731/33);
- Princess Mariam (fl. 1750–1754), who married Jesse (died 1787), son of Prince Giorgi Amilakhvari.

After converting to Islam in Iran, Jesse also had concubines in accordance with Muslim custom. The children of Jesse by his concubines were:

- Archil (Abdullah Beg) (fl. 1716–1762), King of Kartli (r. 1736–1737);
- Prince Husayn Beg (Levan) (fl. 1743–1758);
- Prince Alexander (Ishaq Beg) (died 1775/81), who served as regent of Kartli in the 1740s under Iranian suzerainty before migrating to the Russian Empire, where his descendants became prominent military figures, including Pyotr Bagration;
- An unnamed daughter.

== Sources ==
- D.M. Lang's biography of Ali-Quli Khan in Encyclopaedia Iranica.
- Mikaberidze, Alexander (2015). Historical Dictionary of Georgia (2 ed.). Rowman & Littlefield. ISBN 978-1442241466.
- Toumanoff, Cyril (1976). Manuel de Généalogie et de Chronologie pour l'histoire de la Caucasie chrétienne (Arménie, Géorgie, Albanie) [Manual of Genealogy and Chronology of Christian Caucasian History (Armenia, Georgia, Albania)] (in French). Rome: Edizioni Aquila.

Vacant Interregnum (1711–1714)	King of Kartli; 1714–1716	Succeeded by Vakhtang VI
Preceded by Vakhtang VI	King of Kartli; 1724–1727	Ottoman annexation
