= Avalishvili =

Georgian noble family

Avalishvili family coat of arms.

The House of Avalishvili (Georgian: ავალიშვილი) is a Georgian noble family, which branched off the Panaskerteli-Tsitsishvili house in the 16th century. The initial appanage of the family was located in the historical area called Tori and now known as the Borjomi Gorge with its center at the village of Sadgeri. From 1545 onward, they were vassals to the princes of Samtskhe, which soon came under the influence of the Ottoman Empire and Islam. Fleeing the Islamization of the area, several members of the Avalishvili family moved into inner Georgia early in the 17th century; those who remained in their patrimonial fiefdom, became Muslim and received the title of bek. A branch in Imereti, western Georgia, soon went into decline and their status was downgraded to that of petty nobility. The refugees to the eastern Georgian lands – Kartli and Kakheti – were enfeoffed with several estates and were reconfirmed, in 1826 and 1850, as princes of the Russian Empire.

== See also ==
- List of Georgian princely families
- Giorgi Avalishvili, Georgian diplomat and writer
- Zurab Avalishvili, Georgian diplomat and historian
