= Qaplan Baratashvili-Orbelishvili =

Qaplan Baratashvili-Orbelishvili (Georgian: ყაფლან ბარათაშვილ-ორბელიშვილი; died 1671), also known as the Great Qaplan (Georgian: დიდი ყაფლანის, romanized: didi q'aplanis), was a Georgian nobleman of the Orbelishvili branch of the Baratashvili family, which had separated from the main family in 1536, and the founder of the Qaplanishvili family. Qaplan served as mdivanbeg of the Kingdom of Kartli, a position in which he is mentioned from 1634, and as sakhltukhutsesi from 1646.

In the early 1620s, following the killing of members of his family by Barata Baratashvili, he fled to Iran. He fought on the Iranian side at the Battle of Marabda in 1625. He remained loyal to Simon II, Rostom, and Vakhtang V, from whom he received numerous estates and serfs. He renovated Pitareti Monastery and established and settled 61 villages, leaving approximately 80 villages to his heirs. His sons later became prominent officials of the Kingdom of Kartli. Qaplan was buried at Pitareti Monastery.

== Family ==
Qaplan was married to Tamar, daughter of a Meskhetian Amilakhori. They had five sons and two daughters:

- Rodam (died 1691), the first wife of King Vakhtang V;
- Papuna (died 1689), Molaretukhutsesi and Mourav of Somkhiti;
- Aslan (fl. 1652–1702), Molaretukhutsesi and Mourav of Somkhiti;
- Vakhtang (Orbeli) (died 1695), Mdivanbegi;
- Tamaz (died 1701), Sardali (commander), who died in Iran;
- Giorgi (fl. 1652–1692);
- An unnamed daughter, who married Prince Tsitsi Tsitsishvili.
