= Vakhtang VI =

King of Kartli from 1716 to 1724

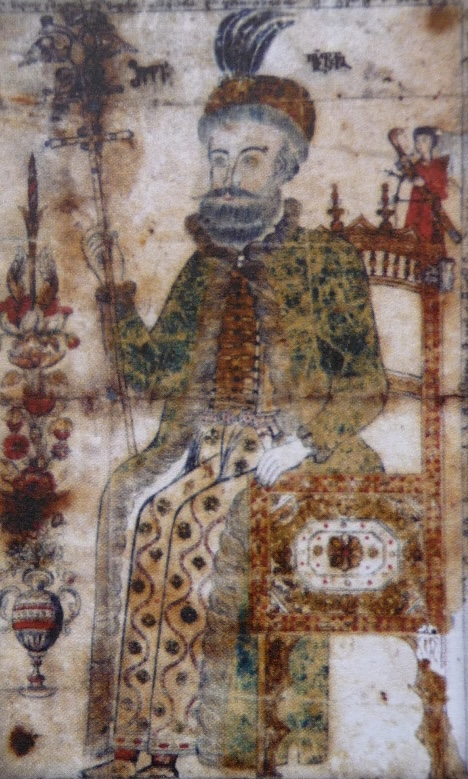
- Miniature depicting Vakhtang VI on his throne, c. early 1700s.

King of Kartli
- Reign: 1716–1724
- Predecessor: Jesse
- Successor: Jesse
- Regent: Bakar (1716–1719)

Regent of Kartli
- Regency: 1703–1714
- Monarch: George XI (1703–1709); Kaikhosro (1709–1711)
- Born: 15 September 1675
- Died: 26 March 1737 (aged 61); Governorate of Astrakhan, Russian Empire
- Burial: Church of Assumption of the Astrakhan Kremlin
- Spouse: Rusudan of Circassia
- Issue: Prince Rostom; Tamar of Kartli; Princess Ana; Princess Tuta; Bakar of Kartli; Prince George; Illegitimate: Prince Vakhushti; Prince Paata
- Dynasty: Bagrationi
- Father: Prince Levan of Kartli
- Mother: Tuta Gurieli
- Religion: Georgian Orthodox Church, Catholic, Islam
- Khelrtva

Vakhtang VI (Note: Among Georgians, he was also known as Vakhtang the Scholar or Vakhtang the Lawgiver, due to his contributions to the Georgian legal code, while Persians also called him Ḥosaynqolī Khan) (Georgian: ვახტანგ VI, 15 September 1675 – 26 March 1737) was a Georgian monarch (mepe) of the royal Bagrationi dynasty. He ruled the East Georgian Kingdom of Kartli as a vassal of Safavid Persia from 1716 to 1724. One of the most important and extraordinary statesmen of early 18th-century Georgia, he is known as a notable legislator, scholar, critic, translator and poet. His reign was eventually terminated by the Ottoman invasion following the disintegration of Safavid Persia, which forced Vakhtang into exile in the Russian Empire. Vakhtang was unable to get the tsar's support for his kingdom and instead had to permanently stay with his northern neighbours for his own safety. On his way to a diplomatic mission sanctioned by Empress Anna, he fell ill and died in southern Russia in 1737, never reaching Georgia.

== As a regent ==
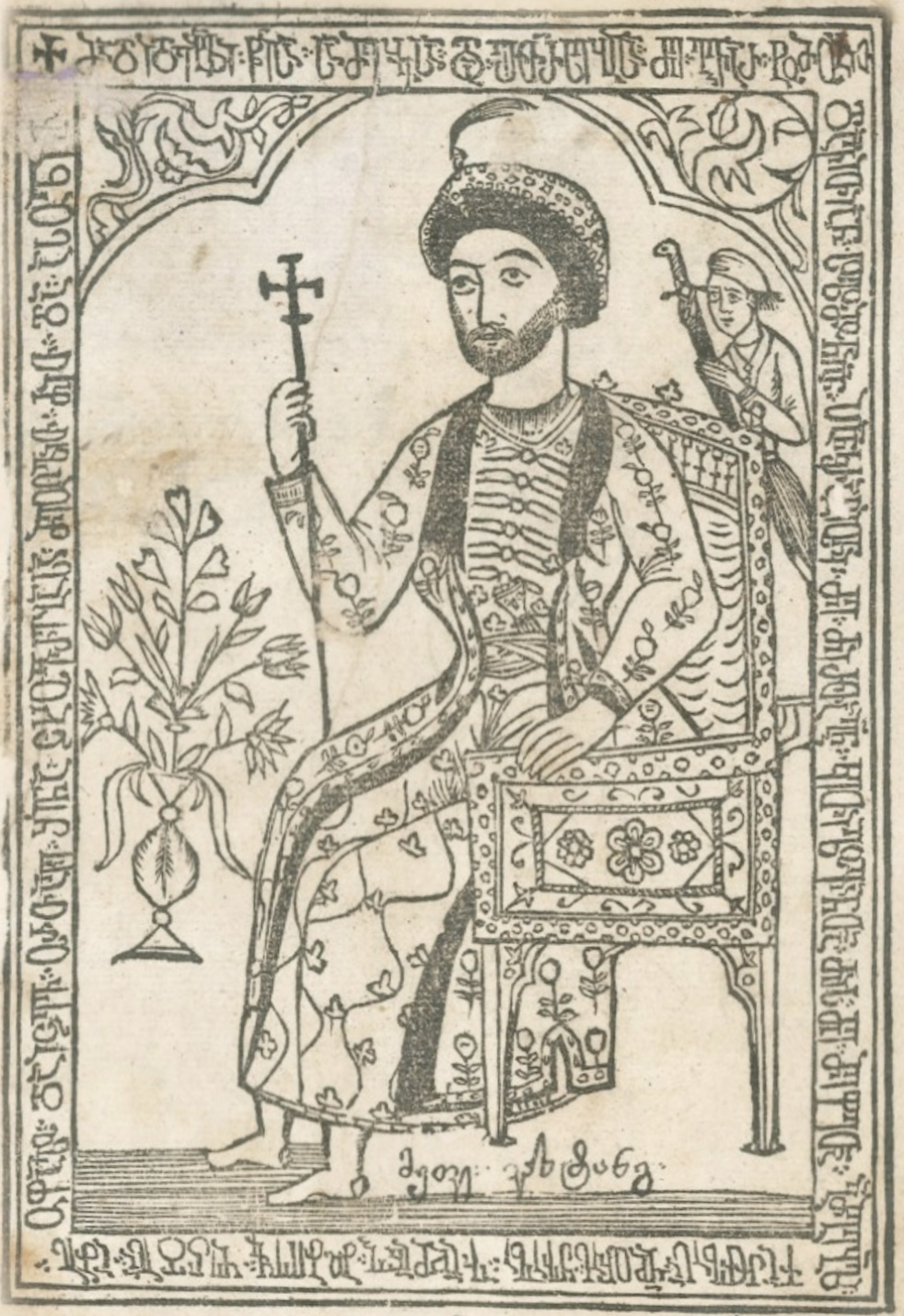
Vakhtang VI from kontakion, printed by Mihai Iștvanovici in 1709 in Tbilisi.

Son of Prince Levan by his first wife, Princess Tuta, daughter of Kaikhosro I Gurieli. Vakhtang ruled as regent (janishin) for his absent uncle, George XI, and his brother, Kaikhosro, from 1703 to 1714. During these years, he launched a series of long-needed reforms, revived the economy and culture, reorganised administration and attempted to fortify the central royal authority. In 1707–1709, he substantially revised the legal code (dasturlamali, aka “Vakhtang’s code”) which would operate as a basis for the Georgian feudal system up to the Russian annexation. He was summoned by the shah Husayn in 1712 to be confirmed as wali/king of Kartli. The shah would not grant the confirmation except on the condition of Vakhtang embracing Islam, which he refused to do; he was imprisoned, and, after a brief regency of Prince Simon, his brother Jesse (Ali Quli-Khan), who complied with the condition, was put in his place in 1714. Jesse governed Kartli for two years, during which he suffered from internal troubles and the inroads of the Dagestani tribes, otherwise known as Lekianoba.

During the years of captivity, Vakhtang requested aid from the Christian monarchs of Europe; in particular, he sent his uncle and tutor, Sulkhan-Saba Orbeliani, on a mission to Louis XIV of France. Later, in his last letters to the Pope Innocent XIII and Charles VI dated 29 November 1722, Vakhtang said that he had for years been secretly Catholic, but he could not confess it publicly "because of betraying people about me", and confirmed with it the reports of Capuchin missionaries from Persia. They claimed that Vakhtang became Catholic before he converted to Islam and went to Catholic Mass. These political efforts were, however, in vain, and Vakhtang reluctantly converted in 1716, adopting the name of Husayn-Qoli Khan. Appointed sipah-salar (commander-in-chief) of the Persian armies, he also served as beglerbeg (governor-general) of Azerbaijan for some time. He sent his son, Bakar, to govern Kartli, whereas Jesse, having abjured Islam, had retired.

== His reign ==
Vakhtang remained in Persia for seven years before he was permitted to return to his kingdom in 1719. He was sent back with the task of putting an end to the continual raids by North Caucasian mountain tribes, particularly the Lezgin tribes of Dagestan. Assisted by the ruler of neighbouring Kakheti as well as the beglarbeg of Shirvan, Vakhtang made significant progress in putting a halt to the Lezgins. At the campaign's climax, however, in the winter of 1721, the Persian government recalled him. The order, which came after grand vizier Fath-Ali Khan Daghestani's fall, was made by the instigation of the eunuch faction within the royal court, having persuaded the shah that a successful end of the campaign for Vakhtang would do the Safavid realm more harm than good; it would enable Vakhtang, the Safavid wali, to form an alliance with Russia with the aim of conquering Iran. This terminated Vakhtang's short-lived loyalty to the Shah. He made secret contacts with Tsar Peter the Great of Russia and expressed his support for Russia's future presence in the Caucasus. After several delays, Peter himself led an army of about 25,000 and a substantial fleet along the west coast of the Caspian Sea in July 1722, initiating the Russo-Persian War (1722–1723).

At this time, Safavid Persia was in internal chaos and had already been declining for years, with the capital Isfahan besieged by rebel Afghans. As a Persian vassal and commander, Vakhtang's brother, Rostom, died during the siege, and the Shah appointed Vakhtang's son Bakar as commander of the defence. However, Vakhtang refused to come to the relief of Isfahan. At the same time, the Ottomans offered him an alliance against Persia, but Vakhtang preferred to await the arrival of the Russians. Peter's promises to provide military support to the Caucasian Christians for final emancipation from the Persian yoke created a great euphoria among the Georgians and Armenians.

In September, Vakhtang VI encamped at Ganja with a combined Georgian-Armenian army of 40,000 to join the advancing Russian expedition. He hoped that Peter would not only seek gains for Russia, but would also protect Georgia from both Persians and Turks. However, Peter became ill and returned to Russia. He directed his armies to seize territories along the Caspian, but chose not to confront the Ottomans, who were already preparing to claim succession to Safavid rule in the Caucasus. Vakhtang, abandoned by his Russian allies, returned to Tbilisi in November 1722. The Shah got revenge on him by giving a sanction to the Muslim king Constantine II of Kakheti to take the kingdom of Kartli. In May 1723, Constantine and his Persians marched into Vakhtang's possessions. Vakhtang, after having defended himself for some time at Tbilisi, was finally expelled. Vakhtang fled to Inner Kartli. From there he attempted to win support from the advancing Ottoman forces and submitted to the authority of the Sultan; but the Turks, having occupied the country, gave the throne to his brother Jesse, who again became a nominal Muslim.

In these invasions by Turkey, Persia, Dagestanis and Afghans, three-fourths of the population of Georgia was destroyed. Vakhtang, after having wandered a long time in the mountains with his most faithful adherents, again sought protection from Peter, who invited him to Russia. Accompanied by his family, his close comrades-in-arms, and a retinue of 1,200, he made his way across the Caucasus to Russia in July 1724. Peter had just died, and his successor, Catherine I, gave no real help but allowed Vakhtang to settle in Russia, granting him a pension and some estates.

Vakhtang resided in Russia till 1734, but in that year he resolved to try to recover his dominions by the co-operation of the Shah of Persia. Tsarina Anna consented to Vakhtang's project, but gave him instructions on how to act in Persia, and in what manner he should induce the Georgians and Caucasian highlanders to become Russian vassals, and bring about their entire submission to Russia. Vakhtang started on his diplomatic journey, in company with a Russian general, but fell ill on his way, and died at Astrakhan on 26 March 1737. He was buried at the city's Church of Assumption. Many of his followers remained in Russia, and later served in the Russian army. A descendant, Pyotr Bagration, was perhaps the most famous of them. A grandson of one of the exiles was Pavel Tsitsianov, who became the Russian governor of newly annexed Georgia in 1802.

== Scholarly and cultural activities ==
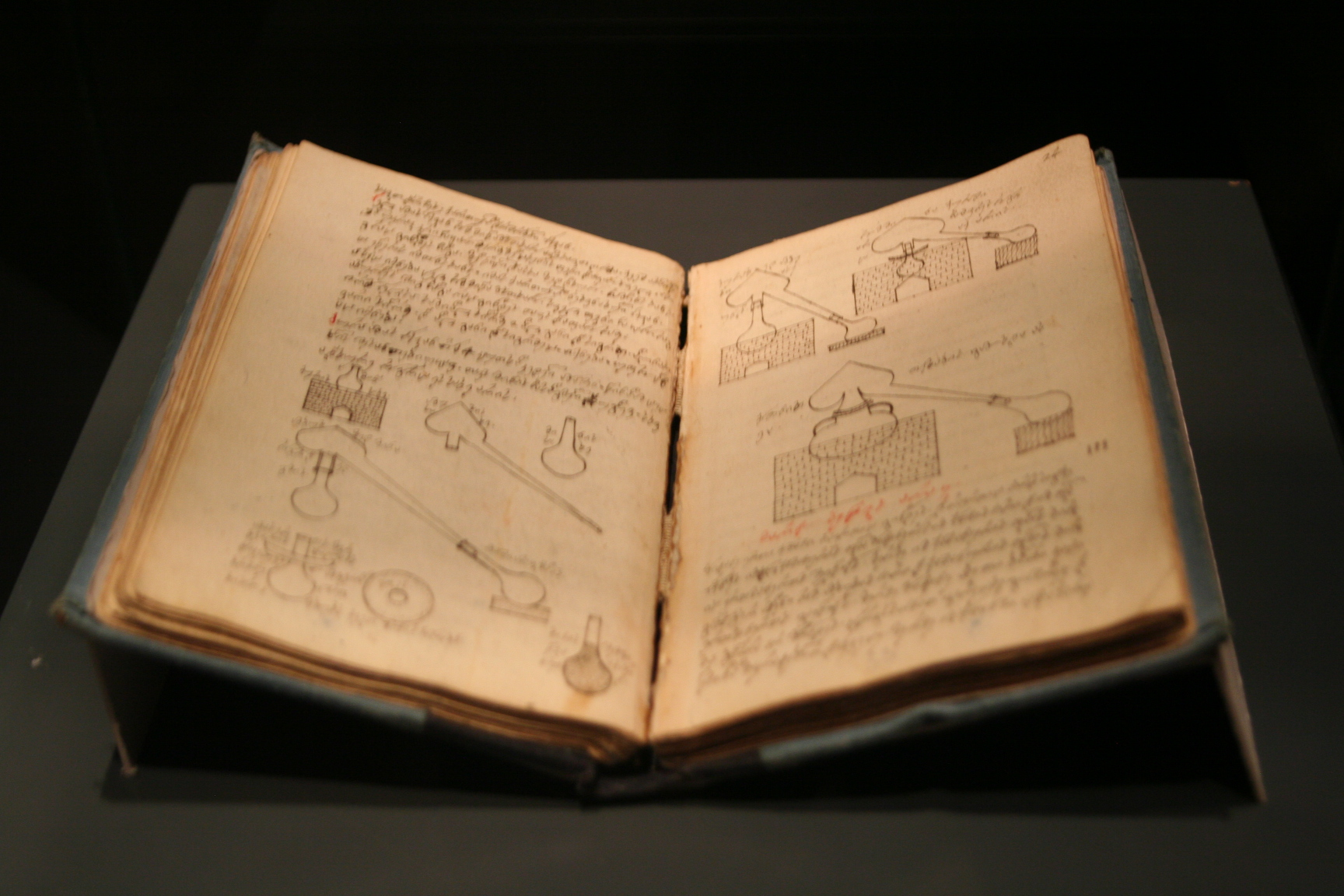
Book of Chemistry by Vakhtang VI. Manuscript of 1740s (copiest Prince Vakhushti). Simon Janashia Museum of Georgia

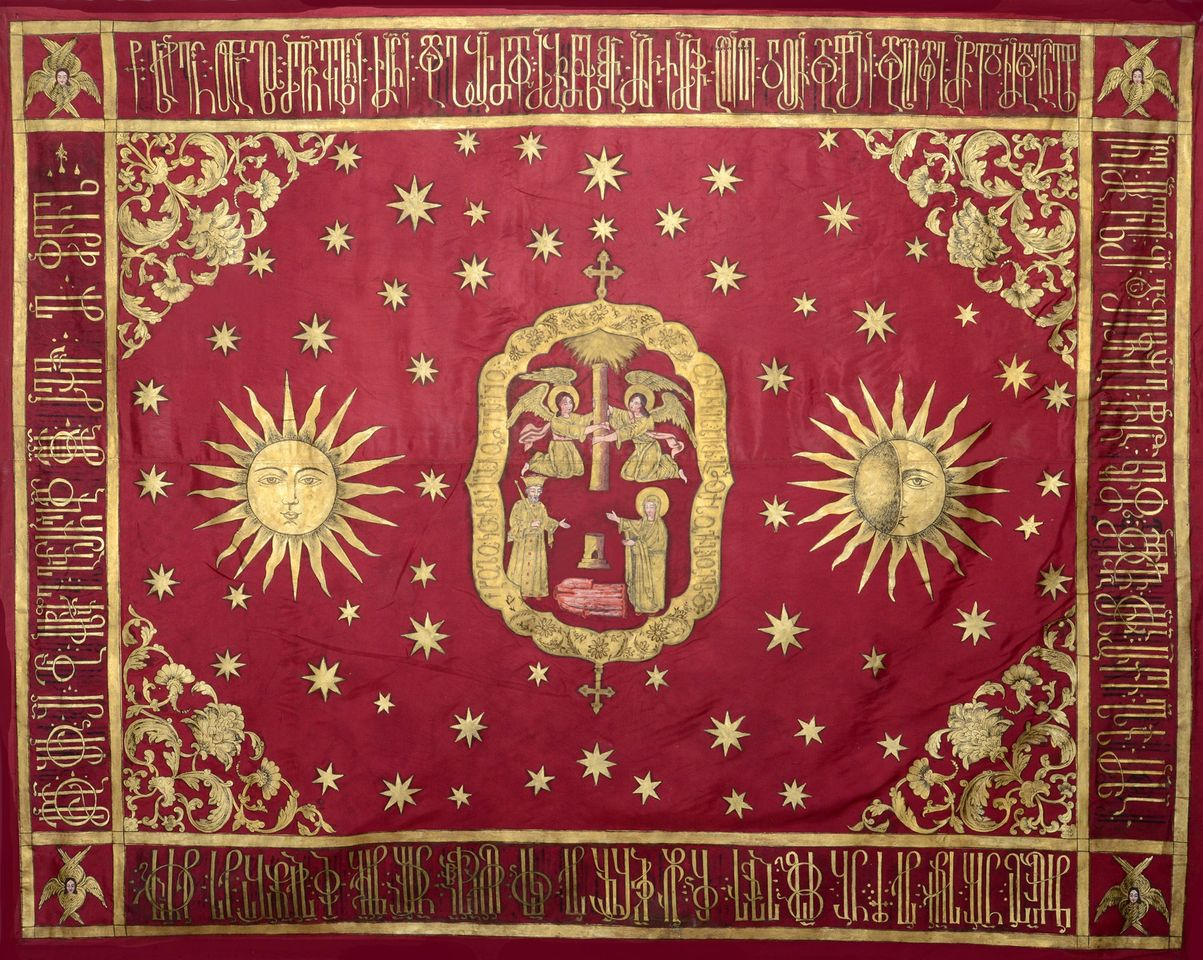
Vakhtang VI's royal banner depicting a scene from the Christianization of Georgia, with King Mirian III standing over the Seamless robe of Jesus at the foundation of the Svetitskhoveli Cathedral.

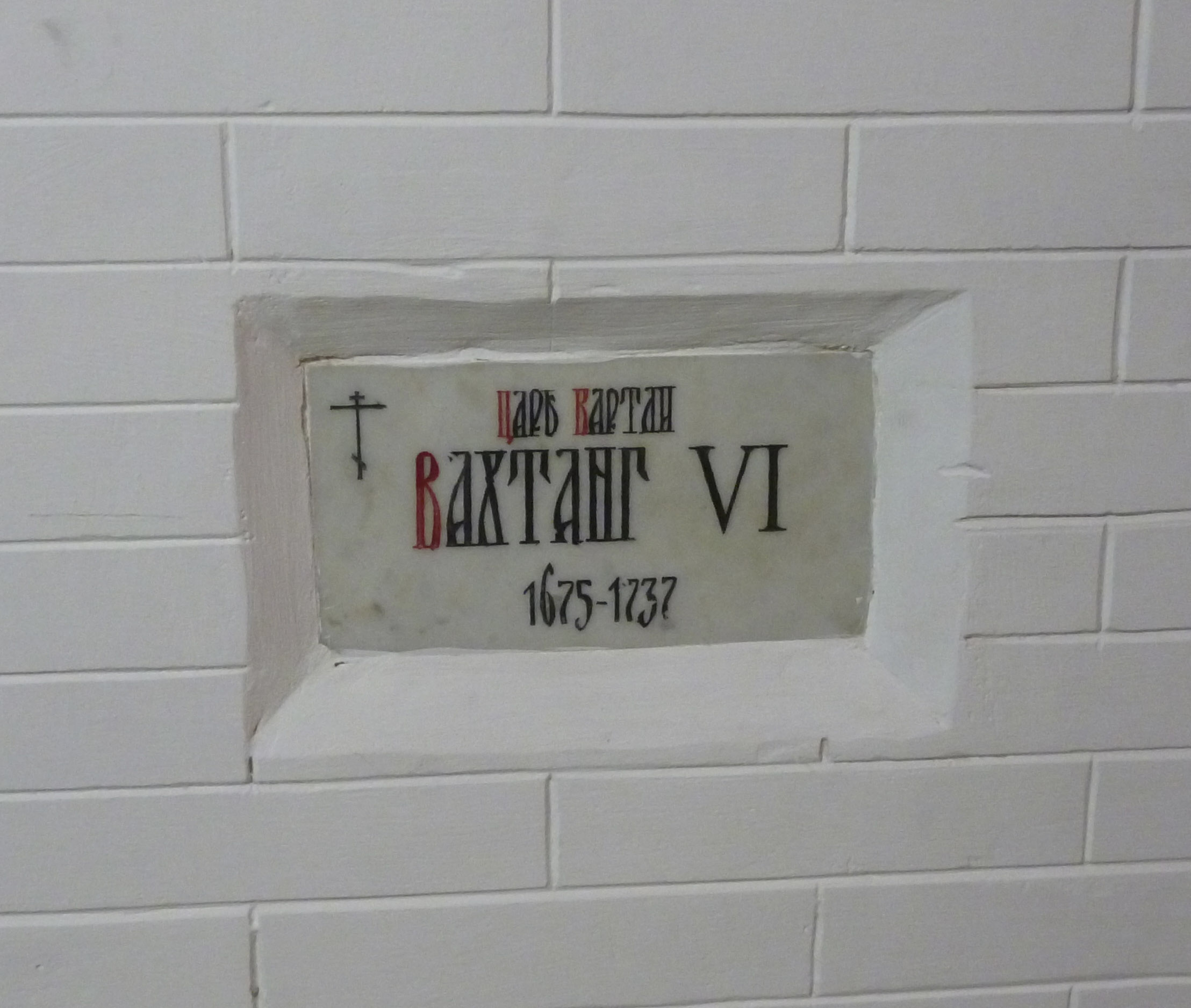
Tomb of King Vakhtang VI in Astrakhan.

Although Vakhtang's political decisions have sometimes been the object of criticism, his scholarly and cultural activities are the crowning merits of his reign. He was, indeed, one of the most learned monarchs of the time. He was an author and organiser of numerous cultural and educational projects aimed at reviving the country's intellectual life. It was him who, with the help of Anthim the Iberian and Mihai Iștvanovici of Wallachia, established, in 1709, the first printing press in Georgia and the whole Caucasus. Among the books published in "Vakhtang's Printing Press" in Tbilisi was the 12th-century national epic poem The Knight in the Panther's Skin (Vep’khistkaosani) by Shota Rustaveli, accompanied by scholarly commentaries by the king himself. This induced a new wave of interest towards that great medieval poet and would influence a new generation of Georgian poets of the 18th century, which is generally regarded as the Renaissance of Georgian literature.

He also undertook the printing of the Bible, which had been, as it is believed, translated as early as the fifth century from the Greek into the Georgian, and corrected in the 11th century by the monks of the Georgian convent on Mount Athos. His printing house also printed the Gospels, the Acts, the Psalms, and several liturgies and prayer-books, causing great discontent at the court of Persia, which perceived that the nominally Muslim Vakhtang, instead of following the Koran, promoted Christianity.

An eminent critic and translator, Vakhtang himself was an author of several patriotic and romantic lyric poems. He is known to have translated an ancient collection of fables Kalila and Demna from Persian to Georgian language. The translation was later finalized and edited by the King's mentor, Sulkhan-Saba Orbeliani. King Vakhtang's translation, along with an earlier translation work by king David I of Kakheti, is considered to be of significant historical importance, since it may help to identify the original text. Vakhtang also chaired a special commission convened to edit and compile the corpus of Georgian chronicles covering the period from the Dark Ages to the early modern era.

== Reburial and portrait fallacy ==
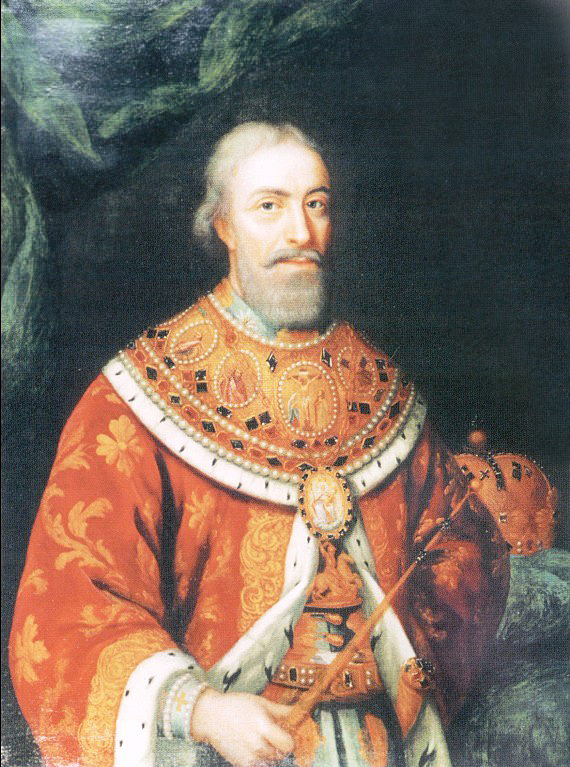
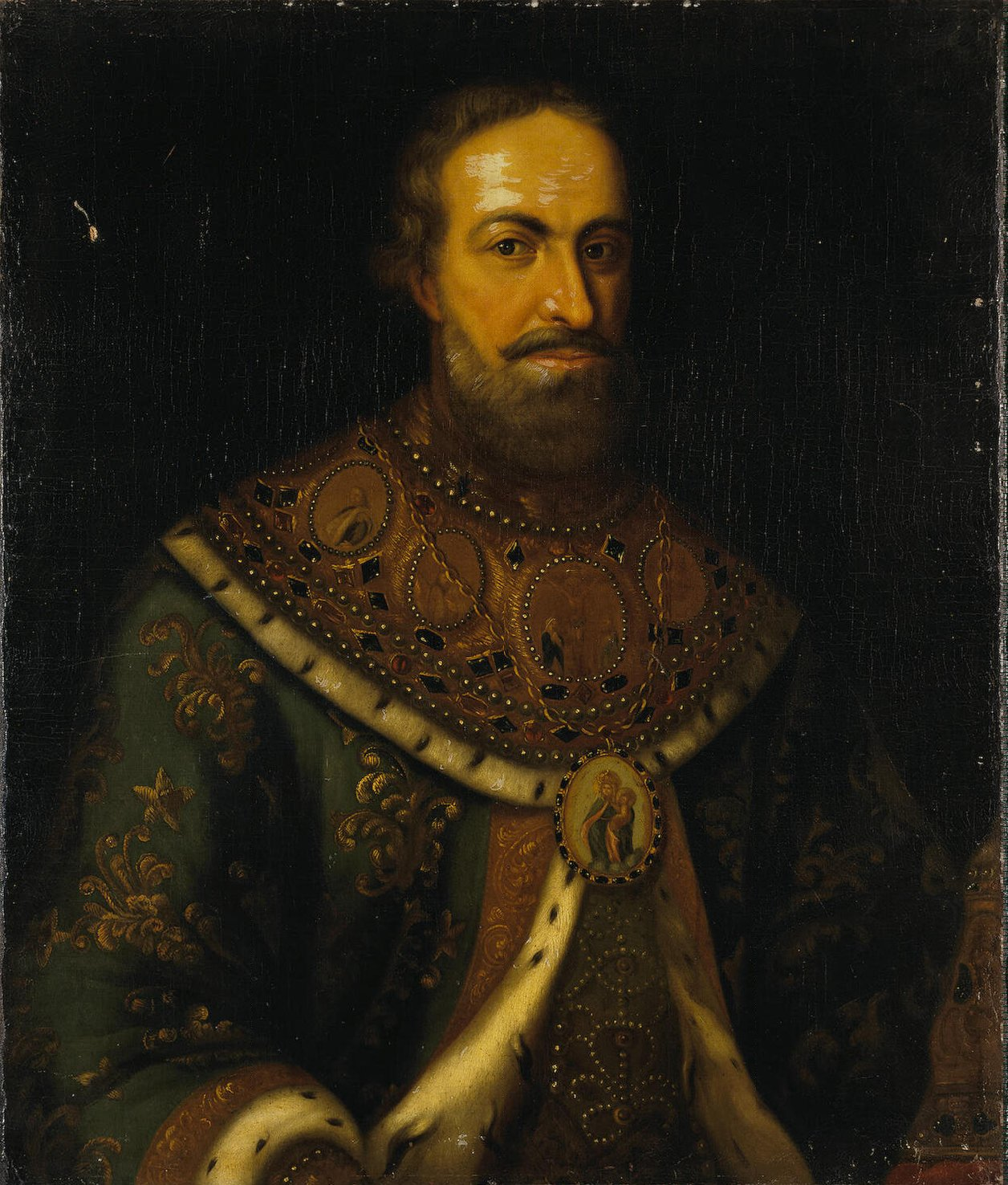
Since the 1950s, the portrait on the left was erroneously thought to depict King Vakhtang VI. The painting's original source and author was unknown but recently it became clear in the scholarly community that both of these two portraits actually depict Patriarch Filaret of Moscow. It became evident by the portrait structure, setting, and garment comparison and by the very fact that the Georgian monarch would not have the historically inappropriate royal garb or insignia of a Russian clergyman.

In July 2013, Georgia raised the possibility of moving Vakhtang's remains to Georgia for reburial.

== Family ==
Vakhtang VI was married to Rusudan, the daughter of a Circassian noble. She accompanied him into exile in Russia and died in Moscow in 1740. They had the following children:

- Prince Rostom (died 1698), who was buried at Tiri Monastery;
- Tamar of Kartli (1696–1746), who married King Teimuraz II in 1712. This marriage to the daughter of the legitimate king of the House of Kartli facilitated the unification of Kakheti and Kartli under the rule of Teimuraz II and their son, Heraclius II;
- Princess Ana (Anuka) (1698–1746), who married Prince Vakhushti Abashidze in 1712;
- Princess Tuta (1699–1746), who was married first to Papuna, Duke of Racha, and second to Gedevan, Duke of Racha;
- Bakar of Kartli (1700–1750), who governed Kartli during his father's absence in Iran. He was later briefly reappointed ruler of Kartli by the Ottomans and subsequently lived in exile in the Russian Empire;
- Prince George (1712–1786), who served as a general in the Imperial Russian Army.

Vakhtang also had two illegitimate sons, both of whom bore the title of Prince (Tsarevich) in Georgia and Russia:

- Prince Vakhushti (1696–1757), a historian and geographer who authored Description of the Kingdom of Georgia;
- Prince Paata (1720–1765), who plotted to assassinate King Heraclius II and seize the throne in 1765. He was executed after the conspiracy was discovered.

== Sources ==
- Floor, Willem M. (2008). Titles and Emoluments in Safavid Iran: A Third Manual of Safavid Administration, by Mirza Naqi Nasiri. Washington, DC: Mage Publishers. p. 287. ISBN 978-1933823232.
- Fisher, William Bayne; Avery, P.; Hambly, G. R. G; Melville, C. (1991). The Cambridge History of Iran. Vol. 7. Cambridge: Cambridge University Press. ISBN 0521200954.
- Matthee, Rudi (2012). Persia in Crisis: Safavid Decline and the Fall of Isfahan. I.B.Tauris. ISBN 978-1845117450.
- The Cambridge History of Iran: Volume 6, the Timurid and Safavid Periods, edited by Peter Jackson, Stanley I Grossman, Laurence Lockhart: Reissue edition (1986), Cambridge University Press, ISBN 0-521-20094-6, page 318.
- (in English) Iranian-Georgian Relations in the 16th- 19th Centuries in Encyclopædia Iranica.
- Ronald Grigor Suny, The Making of the Georgian Nation: 2nd edition (December 1994), Indiana University Press, ISBN 0-253-20915-3, page 54.
- This article incorporates text from the Penny Cyclopædia of the Society for the Diffusion of Useful Knowledge, a publication now in the public domain.
- Brosset, Marie-Félicité (1856). Histoire de la Georgie depuis l'antiquite jusqu'au 19. siecle (in French). Vol. 5. l'acad. Imper. des sciences.
- Lordkipanidze, Mariam; Metreveli, Roin (2000). Sakʻartʻvelos mepʻeebi (in Georgian). Tbilisi: Nekeri. ISBN 9992858362.

Preceded by Jesse	King of Kartli; 1716–1724	Succeeded by Jesse
Preceded by Fath-Ali Khan Turkoman	Commander-in-chief (sepahsalar) 1st term End 1716	Succeeded by Lotf-Ali Khan Daghestani
Preceded by Mohammad Beg Shamlu	Commander-in-chief (sepahsalar) 2nd term June 1722	Succeeded by Abolished
