= Kaikhosro of Kartli =

Georgian titular king of Kartli (1674–1711)

Kaikhosro

King of Kartli
- Reign: 1709—1711
- Predecessor: George XI
- Successor: Interregnum
- Regent: Vakhtang (1709–1711)
- Born: 15 April 1674
- Died: 27 September 1711 (aged 37); Kandahar
- Spouse: Ketevan
- Issue: Prince David; Princess Ana-Begum; Princess Khoreshan; Prince Shanaoz-Khan (ill.)
- Dynasty: Bagrationi
- Father: Prince Levan of Kartli
- Mother: Tuta Gurieli
- Religion: Georgian Orthodox Church, Shia Islam
- Khelrtva

Kaikhosro (Georgian: ქაიხოსრო; 15 April 1674 – 27 September 1711), of the Bagrationi dynasty, was a titular king (a Persian-appointed wali) of Kartli, eastern Georgia, from 1709 to 1711. He reigned in absentia since he served during the whole of this period as a Persian commander-in-chief in what is now Afghanistan.

== Biography ==
Kaikhosro was born on 15 April 1674. He was the eldest son of Prince Levan, and accompanied his father during the service in the Safavid Empire. Since 1703, Kaikhosro himself served on high posts in the Persian administration, including being a darougha (prefect) of the capital city of Isfahan and a naib (deputy) to the divanbeg (chief justice). On the death of his uncle, George XI, in 1709, he was confirmed as a wali/king of Kartli and a sipah-salar (commander-in-chief) of the Persian armies in what is now Afghanistan, and granted Tabriz and Barda in possession. He spent the whole of this period in the field, and Kartli was administered by his brother Vakhtang.

In November 1709, Kaikhosro led a new Persian–Georgian army, supported by contingents from Khorasan, Herat, and Kerman, against the Afghans after Gurgin Khan was assassinated by Mir Wais Hotak, a rebel chieftain of the Ghilzai tribe. Kaikhosro's efforts to take Kandahar, however, were in vain. A fragile truce ensued, but in the summer of 1711 the hostilities resumed. Kaikhosro forced the rebels to withdraw within the walls of Kandahar city which was placed under siege. However, the position of the besiegers soon became precarious due to attacks by the Balochs. The fighting took the life of the Georgian prince Alexander. On October 26, 1711, Kaikhosro ordered a retreat from the city. The Afghans attacked the retreating army and won a crushing victory; Kaikhosro was killed when he fell off his horse and his entire army of 30,000 soldiers (of whom only some 700 escaped) was annihilated.

== Family ==
Kaikhosro was married to Ketevan (died 3 May 1730), daughter of a certain Giorgi. They had three children:

- Prince David (1700 – 28 October 1732), buried at the Donskoy Monastery;
- Princess Ana-Begum (fl. 1724–1786);
- Princess Khoreshan (fl. 1710–1722), who was married first to Shah Soltan Hoseyn and secondly to an unknown Khan of Erivan.

Kaikhosro also had an illegitimate son:

- Prince Shanaoz-Khan (Shah-Navaz-Khan; fl. 1742).

== See also ==
- Kings of Kartli
- Iranian Georgians

== Notes and references ==
- Martin Sicker, The Islamic World in Decline: From the Treaty of Karlowitz to the Disintegration of the Ottoman Empire (Hardcover) (2000), Praeger/Greenwood, ISBN 0-275-96891-X, page 44

Preceded by George XI	King of Kartli; 1709 - 1711	Succeeded by Interregnum (1711-1714)
Preceded by Shahnavaz II, Gorgin Khan (George XI)	Commander-in-chief (sepahsalar); 1709	Succeeded by Mohammad Zaman Khan Shamlu
