= George XI =

King of Kartli (r. 1676–1688, 1703–1709)

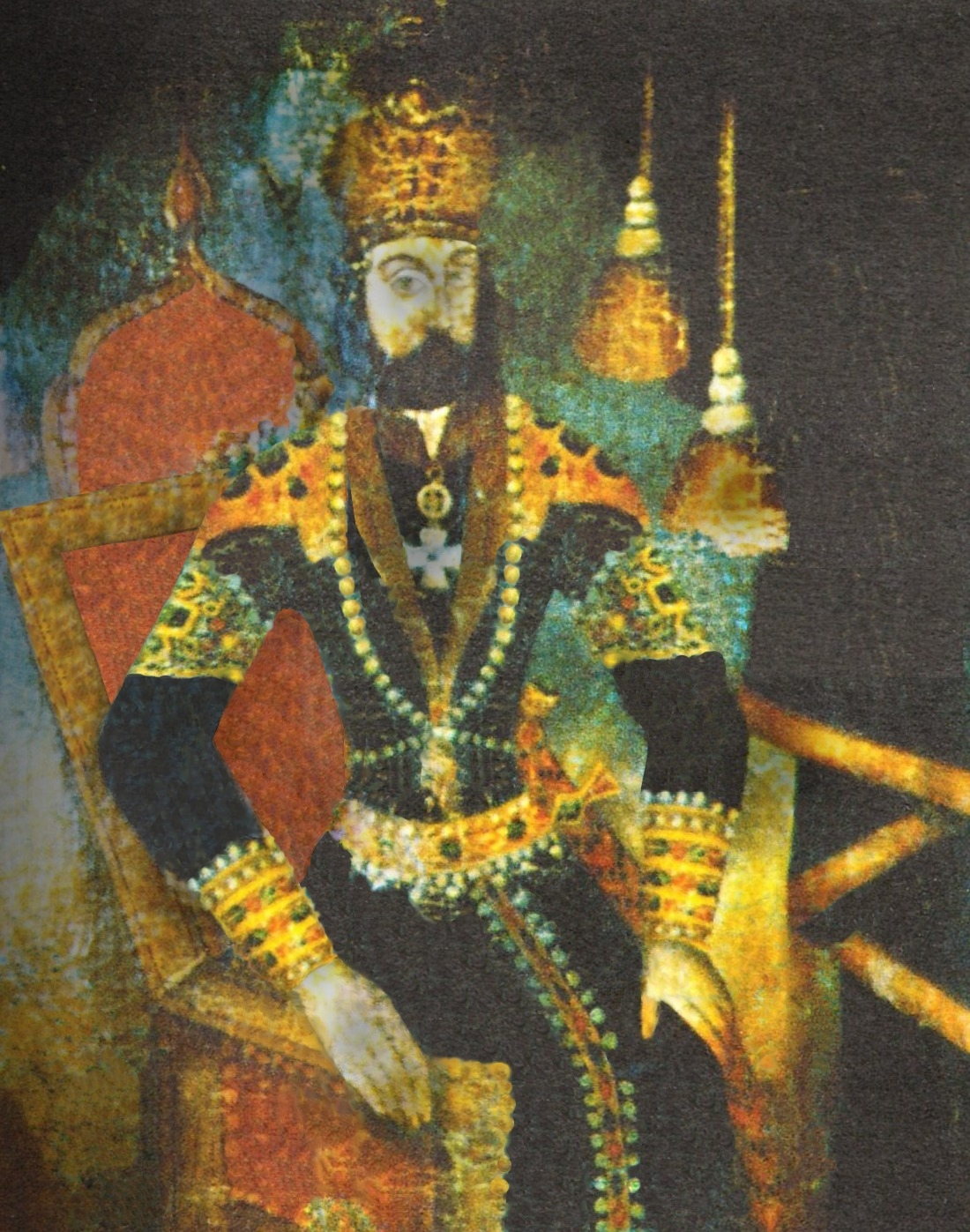
- Portrait by an anonymous artist, turn of the 17/18th century

King of Kartli
- 1st reign: 1676–1688
- Predecessor: Vakhtang V
- Successor: Heraclius I
- 2nd reign: 1703–1709
- Predecessor: Heraclius I
- Successor: Kaikhosro
- Regent: Prince Levan (1703–1704); Prince Vakhtang (1703–1709)
- Died: 21 April 1709; Kandahar, modern day Afghanistan
- Spouse: Tamar Davitishvili (died 1683) Khoreshan Mikeladze (m. 1687; died 1695)
- Issue: Prince Bagrat; Princess Mariam; Princess Rodam
- Dynasty: Bagrationi
- Father: Vakhtang V
- Mother: Rodam Qaplanishvili
- Religion: Roman Catholic prev. Shia Islam prev. Georgian Orthodox Church
- Khelrtva

George XI (Georgian: გიორგი XI, romanized: giorgi XI; died 21 April 1709), also known as Shah Navaz Khan II and Gurgin Khan in Iran, was a Georgian monarch (mepe) who ruled the Kingdom of Kartli as a Safavid Persian subject from 1676 to 1688 and again from 1703 to 1709. He is best known for his struggle against the Safavids which dominated his weakened kingdom and later as a Safavid commander-in-chief in what is now Afghanistan.

== Life ==
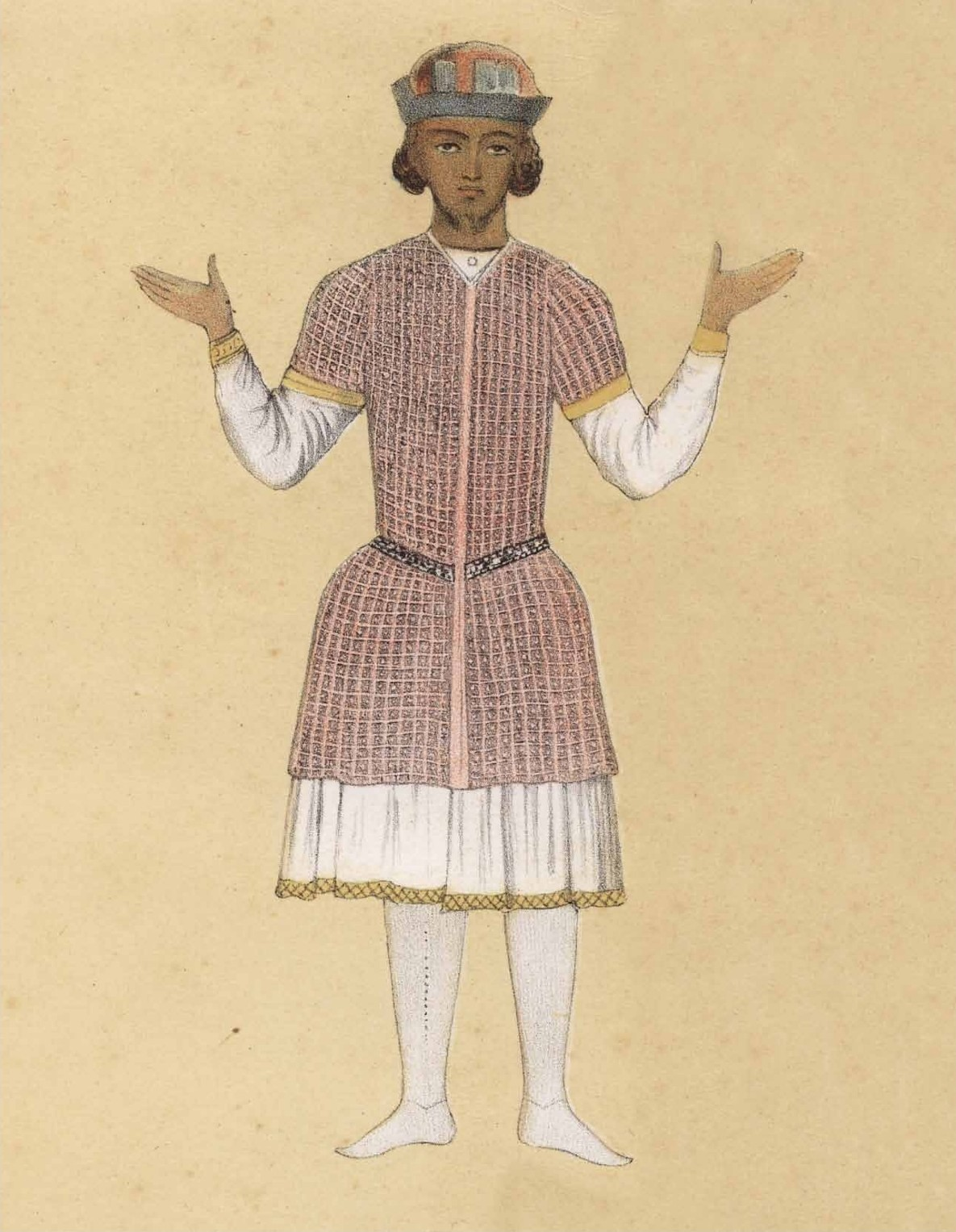
King George XI, copy by Grigory Gagarin.

He was the son of Vakhtang V, whom he succeeded as the ruler of Kartli in 1676, by his first wife, Princess Rodam Qaplanishvili-Orbeliani. As with many other Georgian rulers, he had to nominally accept Islam and take the name of Shahnawaz II before being able to be confirmed as a viceroy by Shah Solayman I.

When nearly half-century-long peaceful relations between Kartli and its Persian suzerains significantly deteriorated, George attempted to centralise loose royal authority in Kartli and weaken the Persian influence. He patronised Catholic missionaries and had correspondence with Innocent XI. After the Ottoman defeat in the Battle of Vienna, George XI hoped to exploit that Empire's new weakness. In a letter to Innocent XI dated April 29, 1687 he vowed to be a Catholic King and declared his readiness and willingness and that of his troops to obey any order of the Roman Pope. According to Catholic missionaries, George remained until his death a faithful Catholic.

In 1688, George headed an abortive coup against a Persian governor of the neighboring Georgian region of Kakheti, and attempted, though vainly, to gain Ottoman support against the Safavid overlordship. In response, Shah Solayman deposed George and gave his crown to the rival Kakhetian prince Erekle I, who then embraced Islam and took the name Nazar-Ali Khan. Abbas Qoli-Khan, the beglarbeg (governor general) of Ganja, was placed in charge of the government in Kakheti and commissioned to reinforce Erekle's positions in Kartli. George fled to Racha in western Georgia, whence he made several attempts to reclaim his possession. In 1696, he managed to stage a temporary comeback and helped his brother Archil II to temporarily regain the crown of Imereti in western Georgia, but was eventually forced to withdraw from Kartli again. In 1694, following the death of Solayman, there was a change in the government in Georgia: Abbas-Quli Khan was accused by his rivals of supporting George XI. On the orders of the new shah Soltan Hosayn, he was promptly arrested by Erekle and sent to Isfahan under guard, while his possessions were confiscated. Qalb-Ali Khan was appointed Abbas-Quli Khan's successor as Persian governor of Kakheti. However, the strife in Georgia as well as the Safavid empire in general forced Husayn to make peace with George who was summoned to Isfahan in 1696. The shah entrusted him with restoring order along the eastern frontiers of the empire and appointed him beglarbeg of Kerman in 1699. It was the beginning of an illustrious but, ultimately, tragic career in the service of the Safavids.

Royal charter of George XI.

George, aided by his brother Levan, by 1700 had reestablished the shah's sovereignty in Kerman. As a reward, George was restored to the throne of Kartli in 1703, but was not allowed to return to his country. Instead, he was soon assigned to suppress the Afghan rebellion in May 1704. He was granted the title of Gurgin Khan by the Shah and was appointed the viceroy of Kandahar province and sipah salar (commander-in-chief) of the Persian armies. While he was in the field, he entrusted the administration of his country of Kartli to a nephew, the future King Vakhtang VI. Gurgin managed to crush the revolts of Afghan tribes and ruled Kandahar with uncompromising severity. He subdued many of the local leaders and sent Mirwais Hotak, a powerful chieftain of the Ghilji Afghans (Pashtuns), in chains to Isfahan. However, Mirwais Khan managed to gain the favour of the Shah and even to arouse his suspicion against the beglarbeg. Determined to bring about the overthrow of Gurgin, Mirwais Khan staged a carefully planned coup. On April 21, 1709, when the majority of the Georgian troops under Gurgin's nephew, Alexander, were away from Kandahar on a raid against the rebels, Mirwais invited Gurgin on a banquet at his country estate at Kokaron in Kandahar City and assassinated him. The assassin was supposedly an Afghan warrior, Younis Kakar, one of a tribal chiefs of Mirwais Hotak. Gurgin's small escort was also massacred and Mirwais seized power in Kandahar. He sent to Isfahan the cross and psalms, found at the murdered Georgian general, as the proof of the latter's covert defection.

A punitive expedition into the Afghan lands led by George's nephew, Kaikhosro, ended in October 1711 disastrously with his death and the destruction of nearly his entire force of 30,000.

== Family ==
George XI was married twice. During the reign of his father, Vakhtang V, he first married Tamar (died 4 December 1683), daughter of Prince David Davitishvili and a descendant of the Kakhetian royal line. In 1687, he married at Kojori his second wife, Khoreshan (died 24 February 1695), daughter of the Imeretian Prince George Mikeladze. George's children were:

- Prince Bagrat (died 1694/95), by Tamar, who was sent to the shah as a political hostage and died at Herat;
- Princess Mariam (died 1715), by Tamar, who married Datuna, Duke of Ksani in 1687;
- Princess Rodam (fl. 1703–1730), by Khoreshan, who married George VI of Imereti in 1703.

== See also ==
- List of the Kings of Georgia
- Iranian Georgians
- History of Georgia

== Bibliography ==
- Brosset, Marie-Félicité (1856). Histoire de la Georgie depuis l'antiquite jusqu'au 19. siecle (in French). Vol. 5. l'acad. Imper. des sciences.

Preceded by Vakhtang V	King of Kartli; 1676–1688	Succeeded by Heraclius I
Preceded by Heraclius I	King of Kartli; 1703–1709	Succeeded by Kaikhosro
Preceded by Rostam Khan	Commander-in-chief (sepahsalar); 1703	Succeeded by Kaykhosrow Khan
