= Ketevan =

Ketevan (Georgian: ქეთევანი) is a Georgian feminine given name. It is sometimes used as a Georgian form of Katherine but, in terms of their etymology, the two names aren't related as Katherine has origins in the Greek language while Ketevan has origins in the Georgian language. Diminutives of Ketevan include Kato, Keti, Keta, Ketato, Keto and Ketino, with Keti popular in English-speaking populations, likely due to its pronunciation and spelling being similar to Katie, and Kato and Keto popular among Georgians in Russia. The name was in common use for Georgian royalty and batonishvili. The name may have Persian roots, meaning ['Queen of the House.']

== Forms ==
- Ketevan (Georgian)
- Kéthévane, Kethevan, Kethevane, Khétévane (French)
- Ketewan (German)

== People ==
=== Academics ===
- Ketevan Lomtatidze (1911–2007), Georgian caucasologist

=== Arts and entertainment ===
- Ketevan "Keti" Khitiri (born 1982), Georgian actress
- Ketevan Magalashvili (1894-1973), Georgian painter
- Ketevan "Katie" Melua (born 1984), Georgian-born British singer-songwriter
- Ketevan "Keti" Topuria (born 1986), Georgian singer

=== Athletics and competition ===
- Elizabeth Stone (nee Ketevan Khurtsidze; born 1990), Georgian-born American swimmer and Paralympic medalist
- Ketevan Arakhamia-Grant (born 1968), Soviet-born Georgian chess grandmaster
- Ketevan "Keto" Losaberidze (1949–2022), Georgian-born Soviet archer and Olympic gold medalist
- Ketevan Arbolishvili (born 2003), Georgian rhythmic gymnast

=== Politics ===
- Ketevan Tsikhelashvili (born 1978), Georgian politician

=== Royalty and nobility ===
- Ketevan the Martyr (d. 1624), member of the House of Mukhrani and wife of King David I of Kakheti
- Ketevan of Kakheti (1648–1719), member of the Bagrationi dynasty and wife of Bagrat IV of Imereti and King Archil II
- Ketevan of Kakheti (fl. 1737), member of the Bagrationi dynasty and wife of Adel Shah
- Ketevan of Georgia (1764–1840), member of the Bagrationi dynasty and wife of Ioane, Prince of Mukhrani
- Ketevan Andronikashvili (1754–1782), member of the Andronikashvili family and wife of King George XII
- Ketevan Bagration of Mukhrani (born 1954), French-born member of the House of Mukhrani and Georgian diplomat
- Ketevan "Keto" Mikeladze (1905–1965), member of Mikeladze family and fashion designer
- Ketevan Pkheidze (d. 1744), member of the Mkheidze family and wife of King Heraclius II of Georgia
- Ketevan Orbeliani (d. 1750), member of the House of Orbeliani

=== Other figures ===
- Ketevan "Kato" Svanidze (1885–1907), Russian-born Georgian wife of Joseph Stalin

== Other uses ==
- Ketevan, album by Katie Melua, released in 2013
- Ketevan Barateli, character in Repentance
