= Prince Mirian of Georgia =

Mirian
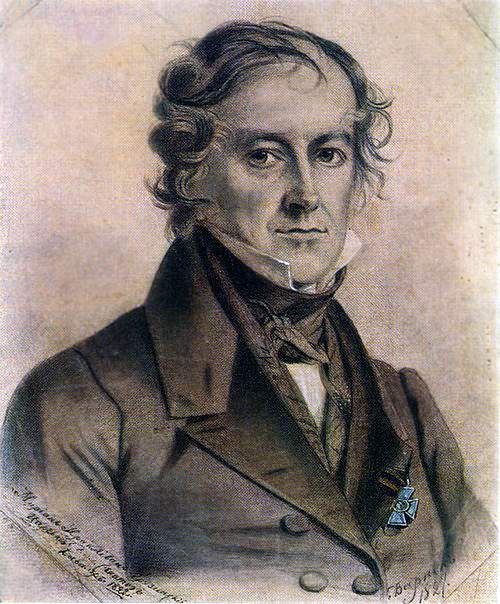
- Mirian of Georgia by Alexander Varnek, 1827.
- Born: 19 August 1767; Kingdom of Kartli-Kakheti
- Died: 15 October 1834 (aged 67); Saint Petersburg, Russian Empire
- Burial: Alexander Nevsky Lavra
- Spouse: Maria Khilkova (m. 1814; died 1815)
- Dynasty: Bagrationi
- Father: Heraclius II of Georgia
- Mother: Darejan Dadiani
- Religion: Georgian Orthodox Church
- Khelrtva

Mirian (Georgian: მირიანი; Russian: Мириа́н Ира́клиевич Грузи́нский, Mirian Irakliyevich Gruzinsky) (19 August 1767 – 15 October 1834) was a Georgian prince (batonishvili) of the Bagrationi dynasty, born to King Heraclius II and Queen Darejan Dadiani. After Heraclius placed his kingdom under the Russian protectorate in 1783, Mirian entered the Russian army, attaining to the rank of major general. He reconciled with the Russian annexation of Georgia in 1801, departing to St. Petersburg, where he ended his days as a senator of the Empire. Of some literary talent, Mirian translated from Russian and himself composed poetry.

== Early life and military career in Russia ==
Mirian was born in 1767 into the family of Heraclius II, King of Kartli-Kakheti and his third wife Darejan Dadiani. He was the fifth son and the ninth child born of this union. Upon signing of the Treaty of Georgievsk between Heraclius II and Catherine the Great in 1783, Mirian and his brother, the hierodeacon Anton, journeyed to St. Petersburg and were attached to the Imperial court. On this occasion, Mirian was commissioned into the Russian service as a colonel of the Iziumsky Light Cavalry Regiment. During the Russo-Turkish War (1787–1792), he served at Kuban. Promoted to major general in 1793, Mirian was the chief of the Kabardinsky Musketeer Regiment from 3 December 1796 to 27 January 1798. He saw service under the command of Count Ivan Gudovich on the Caucasus Line. During these years, he had a regular correspondence with his father and the Georgian court.

== Return to Georgia ==
In January 1798, as his father lay dying, Mirian hurried to Telavi, bringing with him a doctor from Astrakhan, Girtzius. Arriving at home, he found Heraclius dead and his family descending into a dynastic crisis as his mother, Queen Dowager Darejan, insisted that Heraclius's successor and her step-son, George XII, remained pursuant to the late ruler's 1791 testament, requiring the king's successor to pass the throne not to his offspring, but to his eldest brother. This new rule would have made Mirian the fourth in the line of succession, behind George and his brothers, Iulon and Vakhtang. George XII reneged on the testament and obtained from Tsar Paul I of Russia recognition of his son, David, as heir-apparent on 18 April 1799. These developments threw the country in a state of more confusion following George’s death in December 1800 as Darejan and her party, of which Prince Mirian, having retired from the Russian service, was a member, attempted to secure the succession for Prince Iulon. Eventually, the Tsar confirmed none of the pretenders and proceeded to make the annexation of Georgia to the Russian Empire in September 1801.

== Later life in Russia ==
In contrast to his brothers—Iulon, Parnaoz, Alexander, and Vakhtang—Mirian did not take up arms or try to resist the deportation of the Georgian royal family effected by the Russian administration. On 15 March 1801 Mirian acceded to the Tsar's request and departed for Russia. Later in 1801, he was awarded the Russian Order of Saint Anna 1st Class. In 1803 he permanently settled in Saint Petersburg, where he served as an Actual Privy Councilor and senator.

During his years in Saint Petersburg, Mirian translated from Russian the sermons of the Greek religious author Ilias Miniatis and Der Freigeist, a tragedy by the German playwright Joachim Wilhelm von Brawe. Himself a poet of some talent, Mirian composed love-poetry influenced by his contemporaries, Davit Guramishvili and Besiki, the finest pre-Romanticist Georgian poets. Better known is Mirian's poetic address to his fellow Georgian exiles, "Come, young men, gather, valiant warriors" (მოვედით, მოყმენო, შეკრებით, ჯომარდნო). Mirian helped preserve and transmit the poetry of Guramishvili, who, a seasoned veteran of the Russian army, lived in obscurity at his provincial estate in Ukraine. He met Mirian at Kremenchuk in 1787 and through him sent his writings to Georgia.

Mirian died in Saint Petersburg in 1834, at age 67. He was interred at the necropolis of the Georgian nobility at the Alexander Nevsky Lavra.

== Family ==
Mirian married in Saint Petersburg on 22 April 1814 Princess Maria Khilkova (17 June 1788 – 31 May 1815), daughter of Lieutenant-Colonel Prince Alexander Yakovlevitch Khilkov. She died a year after the marriage and was buried at the Alexander Nevsky Lavra. Mirian had no children.

== Ancestry ==
Ancestors of Prince Mirian of Georgia

16. Prince David of Kakheti
8. Heraclius I of Kakheti
17. Elene Diasamidze
4. Teimuraz II
18. Shermazan Cholokashvili
9. Ana Cholokashvili
2. Heraclius II of Georgia
20. Prince Levan of Kartli
10. Vakhtang VI
21. Tuta Gurieli
5. Tamar of Kartli
22. Kelchiko of Kabarda
11. Rusudan of Circassia
1. Mirian
24. George IV Dadiani
12. Bezhan Dadiani
25. Sevdia Mikeladze
6. Katsia-Giorgi Dadiani
26. Gelovani
13. Tamar Gelovani
3. Darejan Dadiani
