= Princess Anastasia of Georgia =

Georgian princess

Princess Anastasia
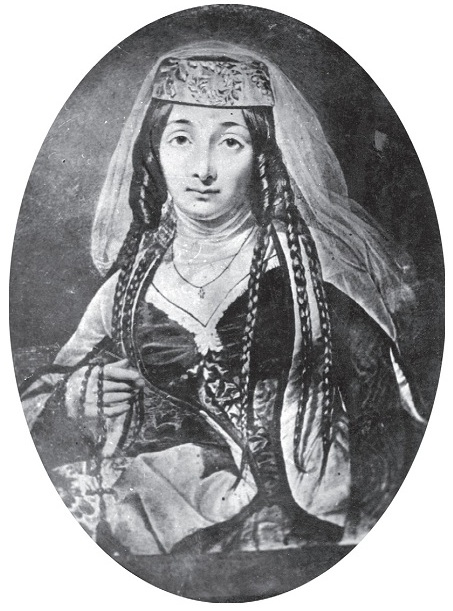
- Born: 3 November 1763; Martkopi, Kakheti
- Died: 17 May 1838 (aged 74); St. Petersburg
- Burial: Church of the Holy Spirit, Alexander Nevsky Lavra, Nevsky Prospekt, St. Petersburg
- Spouse: Prince Revaz Eristavi
- Issue: Prince Iese Eristavi; Prince Shalva Eristavi; Prince Bidzina Eristavi; Prince Giorgi Eristavi; Princess Tamar Eristavi
- Dynasty: Bagrationi
- Father: Heraclius II of Georgia
- Mother: Darejan Dadiani

Princess Anastasia of Georgia (Georgian: ანასტასია; 3 November 1763 – 17 May 1838) was a Georgian princess royal (batonishvili), a daughter of King Heraclius II of Georgia of his third marriage to Darejan Dadiani. She was married into the princely family of Eristavi, former Ducal House of Ksani.

== Biography ==
Princess Anastasia was born at the village of Martkopi in Kakheti in 1763 as the twelfth child into the family of Heraclius and Darejan. On 12 November 1797, at the age of 34, she married Prince Revaz (Roman) Eristavi (c. 1757–1813), a son of Giorgi, Duke of Ksani, who had been dispossessed by Heraclius II of his hereditary duchy in the Ksani valley. Revaz's sister Ana was married to Anastasia's younger brother Parnaoz. The union went through successfully, much to the chagrin of King Heraclius. As she did not receive a dowry from her father, at the time of the Russian annexation of Georgia in 1801, Anastasia's possessions were limited to a garden near Tiflis granted by her half-brother, the late king George XII. In 1802, she was suspected by the Russians of being involved in facilitating the communication between her mother Queen Dowager Darejan in Tiflis and her fugitive anti-Russian brothers, Iulon and Parnaoz, in Imereti.

After the establishment of the Russian rule, Anastasia's husband entered the imperial civil service as a Collegiate Counsellor. Already a widow, Anastasia moved to St. Petersburg in 1825, bringing her younger son, Giorgi, for further education in the imperial capital. She died there of pneumonia in 1838, at the age of 75. She was buried at the Church of the Holy Spirit, Alexander Nevsky Lavra.

== Children ==
Princess Anastasia had five children with Revaz Eristavi.

1. Prince Iese Eristavi (died 1811)
2. Prince Shalva Eristavi (1798 – 12 August 1849), a Titular Counsellor in the Russian service. He was murdered by a peasant, Biba Dodashvili. He was married to Princess Ekaterine Orbeliani, with issue.
3. Prince Bidzina Eristavi (1800–1876), podporuchik of the Russian army. He took part in the 1832 conspiracy of the Georgian nobles against the Russian rule and spent eight months in prison. He was married to Princess Tamar Melikishvili, with issue.
4. Prince Giorgi Eristavi (12 February 1802 – 5 November 1891), Lieutenant-general of the Russian army. He was married to Princess Ana Argutinsky-Dolgorukova, with issue.
5. Princess Tamar (Mariam) Eristavi (1805–1848). She was married to Prince Shermazan (Simon) Abkhazishvili.

== Ancestry ==
Ancestors of Princess Anastasia of Georgia

16. Prince David of Kakheti
8. Heraclius I of Kakheti
17. Elene Diasamidze
4. Teimuraz II
18. Shermazan Cholokashvili
9. Ana Cholokashvili
2. Heraclius II of Georgia
20. Prince Levan of Kartli
10. Vakhtang VI
21. Tuta Gurieli
5. Tamar of Kartli
22. Kelchiko of Kabarda
11. Rusudan of Circassia
1. Anastasia
24. George IV Dadiani
12. Bezhan Dadiani
25. Sevdia Mikeladze
6. Katsia-Giorgi Dadiani
26. Gelovani
13. Tamar Gelovani
3. Darejan Dadiani
