= Princess Mariam of Georgia =

Princess of Georgia (1755–1828)

Mariam (Georgian: მარიამი) (1755 – 3 November 1828) was a Georgian princess royal (batonishvili), daughter of Heraclius II, the penultimate King of Kartli and Kakheti. Like her sisters, Ketevan and Thecla, Mariam was a poet of some talent and wrote in the spirit of early Romanticism.

== Family ==
Mariam was the 12th child of Heraclius II and the second daughter born of that ruler's third marriage to Darejan Dadiani. In 1777, Mariam married Prince David Tsitsishvili (1749–1792), a scion of the medieval house of Panaskerteli and governor (mouravi) of the royal capital of Tbilisi. The couple had 7 children:

1. Prince Alexander Tsitsishvili (died before 1801).
2. Prince Evstati Tsitsishvili (1778–1828), a civil servant, mouravi of Pambak, and a close companion of his uncle, Catholicos Anton II of Georgia. He was married and had issue.
3. Prince Nikoloz Tsitsishvili (1779–?); he was married to Princess Ekaterine Tusishvili and had issue.
4. Prince Ioane Tsitsishvili (1784–c. 1835); he was married to Princess Elisabed Pavlenishvili and had issue.
5. Prince Dimitri Tsitsishvili (1790–?); he was married to Princess Avalishvili and had no issue.
6. Princess Anastasia Tsitsishvili (1782–?).
7. Princess Natalia Tsitsishvili (1786–?).

== Biography ==
After the annexation of the Georgian kingdom by the Russian Empire in 1801, the widowed princess Mariam lived a reclusive life. Being one of the few members of the Georgian royal family to avoid deportation to Russia proper, she retired to her rural estate at Kareli, part of her dowry. In 1803, the Russian authorities contemplated to give her the village of Didi Shulaveri in permanent and hereditary possession, but this was eventually ruled to be unfeasible. Instead, Mariam's son, Evstati Tsitsishvili, was granted a lifelong pension of revenues earned from that village. Mariam died at Kareli after a long illness in 1828. She was buried at the Sioni Cathedral in Tbilisi.

Like several members of her family, such as her sisters—Ketevan and Tekle—Mariam had a literary talent. Her friend, Princess Barbare Kobulashvili recalls that the contemporaries highly regarded her for her poetry and love for music. Her works, such as her best poem, "Alas, that the sweetness of time should turn better" (ჰოი, დამწარდეს დროთა ტკბილობა), are of early Romantic flavor, inspired by the loss of the native kingdom and family.

== Ancestry ==
Ancestors of Princess Mariam of Georgia

16. Prince David of Kakheti
8. Heraclius I of Kakheti
17. Elene Diasamidze
4. Teimuraz II
18. Shermazan Cholokashvili
9. Ana Cholokashvili
2. Heraclius II of Georgia
20. Prince Levan of Kartli
10. Vakhtang VI
21. Tuta Gurieli
5. Tamar of Kartli
11. Rusudan of Circassia
1. Mariam
24. George IV Dadiani
12. Bezhan Dadiani
25. Sevdia Mikeladze
6. Katsia-Giorgi Dadiani
26. Gelovani
13. Tamar Gelovani
3. Darejan Dadiani
