= Prince Levan of Georgia (1756–1781) =

Georgian prince, diplomat, and military commander

Prince Levan

Duke of Aragvi
- Reign: 1766–1781
- Predecessor: Prince Vakhtang
- Successor: Prince Vakhtang-Almaskhan
- Born: 2 February 1756; Tbilisi, Kingdom of Kartli
- Died: 5 February 1781 (aged 25); Vejini, Kingdom of Kartli-Kakheti
- Spouse: Nino Andronikashvili (m. 1774)
- Dynasty: Bagrationi
- Father: Heraclius II of Georgia
- Mother: Darejan Dadiani
- Religion: Georgian Orthodox Church
- Khelrtva

Levan or Leon (Georgian: ლევანი, ლეონი; 2 February 1756 – 5 February 1781) was a Georgian royal prince (batonishvili) of the Bagrationi dynasty, born to King Heraclius II and Queen Darejan Dadiani. His career flourished in the 1770s, when he was an ambassador to the Russian Empire and then an army commander. Levan was a talented general and a major supporter of his father's military reforms which eroded irreversibly after Levan's mysterious death in 1781.

== Early life ==
Levan was born in Tbilisi on 2 February 1756 as the third son of Heraclius II, then King of Kakheti, and the eldest son of his third wife, Darejan Dadiani. Levan's paternal grandfather, Teimuraz II, was King of Kartli, and left his kingdom, on his death in 1762, to Heraclius II. In 1766, Levan was enfeoffed with the princely appanage in the Aragvi valley, earlier held in possession of his late half-brother Vakhtang, who died in 1756.

== Ambassador to Russia ==
Levan became involved in war and politics at a very young age. At 14, he already accompanied his father in military campaigns. In December 1771, during the Russian-Ottoman war of 1768–1774, in which the Georgians fought on the Russian side, Heraclius sent Levan and his cousin, the Catholicos-Patriarch of Georgia, Anton I, to negotiate a Russian protectorate over the Kingdom of Kartli-Kakheti. The Georgian embassy arrived in Astrakhan on 6 March 1772, but they were refused permission to continue to Saint Petersburg. After a series of delays they reached the Russian capital almost a year later and presented on 27 April 1773 to the minister Nikita Panin Heraclius's proposal: the Kingdom of Kartli-Kakheti would remain an hereditary monarchy ruled by Heraclius's offspring under Russian protectorate; the Russian troops would be permanently stationed in Georgia to protect the country from external threats; a percentage of Georgia's tax revenues would be paid to the Imperial government, and the Georgians would join any campaign in which Russia was involved. The embassy ended in failure and the Georgian question was largely omitted in the Treaty of Küçük Kaynarca concluded between the Russian and Ottoman empires on 10 July 1774. Levan returned to Georgia in August 1774 with nothing but the Order of Saint Anna awarded to him by the Russian government.

== Army commander ==
Returning to Georgia, Levan was placed in 1774 by Heraclius II in charge of the newly created permanent frontier force (morige lashkari), whose statutes had been approved by the royal council on 4 January 1773. This was an embryonic standing army, in which all able-bodied Georgian subjects were to serve. Levan's enthusiasm and personal courage helped make this force an effective instrument in fending off the incessant marauding inroads by the Dagestani mountaineers and won him a hero's status. In 1777, Levan, jointly with his older half-brother, Crown Prince George, campaigned against George, the rebellious duke (eristavi) of Ksani, who had attacked Kartli with the Dagestani mercenaries, and brought him in chains to Tbilisi in December 1777. Heraclius abolished the duchy and declared it a crown land, dividing most of its territory between his two sons, George and Iulon.

== Death ==
Prince Levan, aged 25, died on 5 February 1781 at the mansion of Prince Ioane Abashidze in the village of Vejini in Kakheti, under circumstances that have remained unresolved. Although a homicide was immediately suspected, the inquiry into the case failed to reveal a murderer. Allegations that Levan was stabbed to death by Prince Asat Vachnadze for taking liberties with his wife, that Levan died after "eating too much salmon" that day, or that he was poisoned by Prince Shermazan Abkhazi were never confirmed, but suspicion that Levan fell victim to political intrigues has persisted to this day.

The loss of his favorite son was a blow to the aging King Heraclius and the regular army which Levan had commanded gradually crumbled after his death. The 19th-century British historian and Indian Army officer William Monteith, who met Heraclius's son, Alexander, in Iran in the 1820s, wrote of Levan: "He appeared to be endowed with most of the better qualities and much of the talent of his father, who might have hoped to find in him a successor capable of governing his distracted country; but he was assassinated at Telav by a Georgian, and with him perished the last hopes of Heraklius."

Levan's death was mourned in their elegies by his contemporary poets such as his personal friend Besiki, David the Rector, Molla Panah Vagif, and Molla Vali Vidadi. He is also praised in folk poetry.

== Family ==
In 1774, Levan married Nino (15 November 1766 – c. 1816), daughter of Prince Kaikhosro Andronikashvili, mdivanbegi ("High Court judge") and sometime governor-general of Ganja. As his sisterly nephew, Alexander Orbeliani, recalled in an 1865 essay on Levan, this princess was much loved by her husband, but regarded as frivolous and disliked by other members of the royal family. After Levan's death, Nino lived separately from the royal family, and died in obscurity in Tbilisi around 1816. Levan had two sons who died young; their names are unrecorded.

== Ancestry ==
Ancestors of Prince Levan of Georgia (1756–1781)

16. Prince David of Kakheti
8. Heraclius I of Kakheti
17. Elene Diasamidze
4. Teimuraz II
18. Shermazan Cholokashvili
9. Ana Cholokashvili
2. Heraclius II of Georgia
20. Prince Levan of Kartli
10. Vakhtang VI
21. Tuta Gurieli
5. Tamar of Kartli
22. Kelchiko of Kabarda
11. Rusudan of Circassia
1. Levan
24. George IV Dadiani
12. Bezhan Dadiani
25. Sevdia Mikeladze
6. Katsia-Giorgi Dadiani
26. Gelovani
13. Tamar Gelovani
3. Darejan Dadiani
