= Princess Tekle of Georgia =

Georgian princess

- Batonishvili
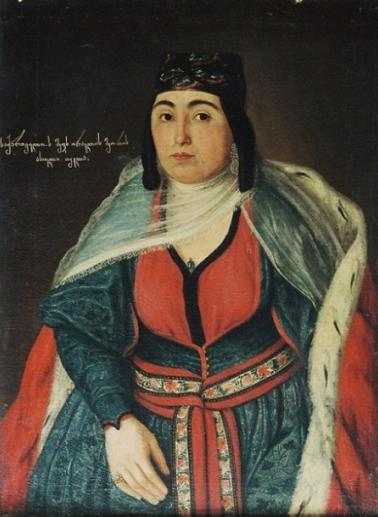
- Princess Tekle of Georgia (c. 1800)
- Born: 1776
- Died: 11 March 1846 (aged 69–70); Tiflis
- Burial: Svetitskhoveli Cathedral, Mtskheta
- Spouse: Prince Vakhtang Orbeliani
- Issue: Alexander Orbeliani; Nikoloz Orbeliani; Dimitri Orbeliani; Vakhtang Orbeliani
- House: Bagrationi
- Father: Heraclius II of Georgia
- Mother: Darejan Dadiani

Princess Tekle (Georgian: თეკლე, t'ekle; 1776 – 11 March 1846) was a Georgian princess royal (batonishvili) and poet. She was a daughter of Heraclius II, the penultimate king of Kartli and Kakheti, the wife of Prince Vakhtang Orbeliani, and mother of the Georgian literati, Alexander and Vakhtang Orbeliani.

== Biography ==
A tombstone of Princess Tekle, Mtskheta

Tekle was born in 1776 in the family of Heraclius II and his third wife Darejan Dadiani. The king's favorite daughter, Tekle was nicknamed by Heraclius a "tomboy" (თეკლე-ბიჭი) for her forceful character. Unlike most of her siblings, Tekle avoided the deportation of the Georgian royal family effected by the Russian Empire following its annexation of Georgia in 1801. She was made Lady of the Russian Order of St. Catherine (Lesser Cross).

The fate of Tekle's family reflected the ambiguous situation the Georgian nobility found themselves with the arrival of the Russian rule. Her husband, Prince Orbeliani, was killed fighting in the Russian ranks against the Georgian rebels in Kakheti in 1812, while Tekle, like her sisters, Mariam and Ketevan, wrote poems imbued with elegy and laments for the lost Georgian kingdom. Among a handful of surviving poems is a reaction to her sister's despair, "In Response to Princess Ketevan" (პასუხად ქეთევან ბატონიშვილს).

In 1832 Tekle's family in Tiflis became the meeting place of the Georgian nobles and intellectuals disaffected with the Russian overlordship. A planned coup aimed at restoring an independent Georgian monarchy was betrayed and the plotters were rounded up by the police. Tekle shared exile with her sons in Kaluga, where she lived from 11 October 1834 to 6 May 1835. She was, thereafter, allowed to return to Tiflis, where she died in 1846. She was buried at the Cathedral of the Living Pillar in Mtskheta.

== Family ==
Tekle married on 7 September 1800 Prince Vakhtang Orbeliani (1769–1 March 1812), mouravi of Sagarejo and colonel in the Russian service. They had four sons:

- Alexander (3 May 1801 – 9 December 1869)
- Nikoloz (born 1803)
- Dimitri (1806–1882)
- Vakhtang (5 April 1812 – 29 September 1890)

== Ancestry ==
Ancestors of Princess Tekle of Georgia

16. Prince David of Kakheti
8. Heraclius I of Kakheti
17. Elene Diasamidze
4. Teimuraz II
18. Shermazan Cholokashvili
9. Ana Cholokashvili
2. Heraclius II of Georgia
20. Prince Levan of Kartli
10. Vakhtang VI
21. Tuta Gurieli
5. Tamar of Kartli
22. Kelchiko of Kabarda
11. Rusudan of Circassia
1. Tekle
24. George IV Dadiani
12. Bezhan Dadiani
25. Sevdia Mikeladze
6. Katsia-Giorgi Dadiani
26. Gelovani
13. Tamar Gelovani
3. Darejan Dadiani
