= Prince Vakhtang-Almaskhan of Georgia =

Vakhtang-Almaskhan
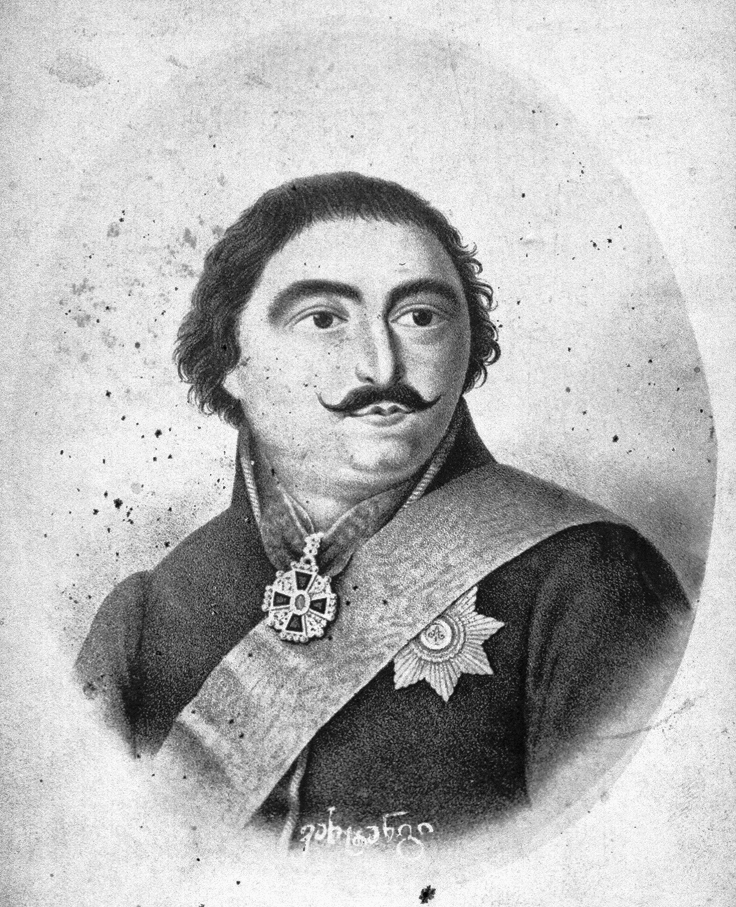

Duke of Aragvi
- Reign: 1782–1801
- Predecessor: Prince Levan
- Successor: Russian annexation
- Born: 22 June 1761; Telavi, Kingdom of Kakheti
- Died: 28 October 1814 (aged 53); Saint Petersburg, Russian Empire
- Spouse: 1) Princess Tsulukidze; 2) Mariam Andronikashvili
- Dynasty: Bagrationi
- Father: Heraclius II of Georgia
- Mother: Darejan Dadiani
- Religion: Georgian Orthodox Church
- Khelrtva

Vakhtang (Georgian: ვახტანგი, romanized: vakht'angi) also known as Almaskhan (Georgian: ალმასხანი, romanized: almaskhani; 22 June 1761 – 28 October 1814) was a Georgian prince royal (batonishvili) of the Bagrationi dynasty, born to King Heraclius II and Queen Darejan Dadiani. He distinguished himself in the war with Iran in 1795 and was then active in opposition to his half-brother George XII and the newly established Russian administration in Georgia. In 1802 he surrendered to the Russian authorities and spent the rest of his life in Saint Petersburg, working on an overview of Georgia's history. In Russia he was known as the tsarevich Vakhtang Irakliyevich Gruzinsky (Russian: Вахтанг Ираклиевич Грузинский).

== Prince Royal ==
Vakhtang was born in 1761 into the family of Heraclius II, King of Kakheti (and of Kartli after 1762), and his third wife Darejan Dadiani. He was a namesake of his late half-brother, Vakhtang (died in 1760), and also bore the second name, Almaskhan. After the death of his brother Levan in 1781, Vakhtang succeeded him to the princely appanage in the mountainous Aragvi valley, for which he codified the criminal and family law (განჩინება ბარისა და მთიურთა ადგილთა, The Regulations for the Lowlands and Highlands) in 1782. In September 1795, Vakhtang fought in his father's ranks against the invading Iranian army of Agha Mohammad Khan Qajar at the battle of Krtsanisi in the course of which he commanded the last stand of his highlanders on the approaches of Tbilisi.

== Civil unrest ==
After the death of Heraclius in 1798, Vakhtang joined his mother Queen Dowager Darejan and brothers, Iulon, Parnaoz, and Alexander, in opposition to his half-brother, King George XII. The crisis was occasioned by George's renegation on the 1791 testament of Heraclius, requiring the king's successor to pass the throne not to his offspring, but to his eldest brother, thereby making Vakhtang the third in the line of succession, behind George and Iulon. George XII renewed Heraclius's quest for Russian protection and obtained from Tsar Paul I recognition of his son, David, as heir-apparent on 18 April 1799.

By July 1800, the kingdom faced the prospect of imminent civil war as the rival factions mobilized their loyal forces. Iulon, Vakhtang, and Parnaoz blocked the roads to Tbilisi and attempted to rescue their mother, Queen Dowager Darejan, who had been forced by George XII into confinement at her own palace in Avlabari. The arrival of additional Russian troops under Major-General Vasily Gulyakov in September 1800 in Tbilisi made George XII's position relatively secure, but after his death in December 1800 the Russians prevented his heir David from acceding to the throne and went ahead with the outright annexation of Georgia to the Russian Empire. Vakhtang, who had by that time retired to his residence in Dusheti, in the Aragvi valley, was suspected by the Russians of being responsible of sabotaging the Russian communications and being in touch with his rebellious brother Alexander, who had staged, with his Avar allies, an abortive invasion of the eastern Georgian province of Kakheti in November 1800.

== Arrest and exile ==
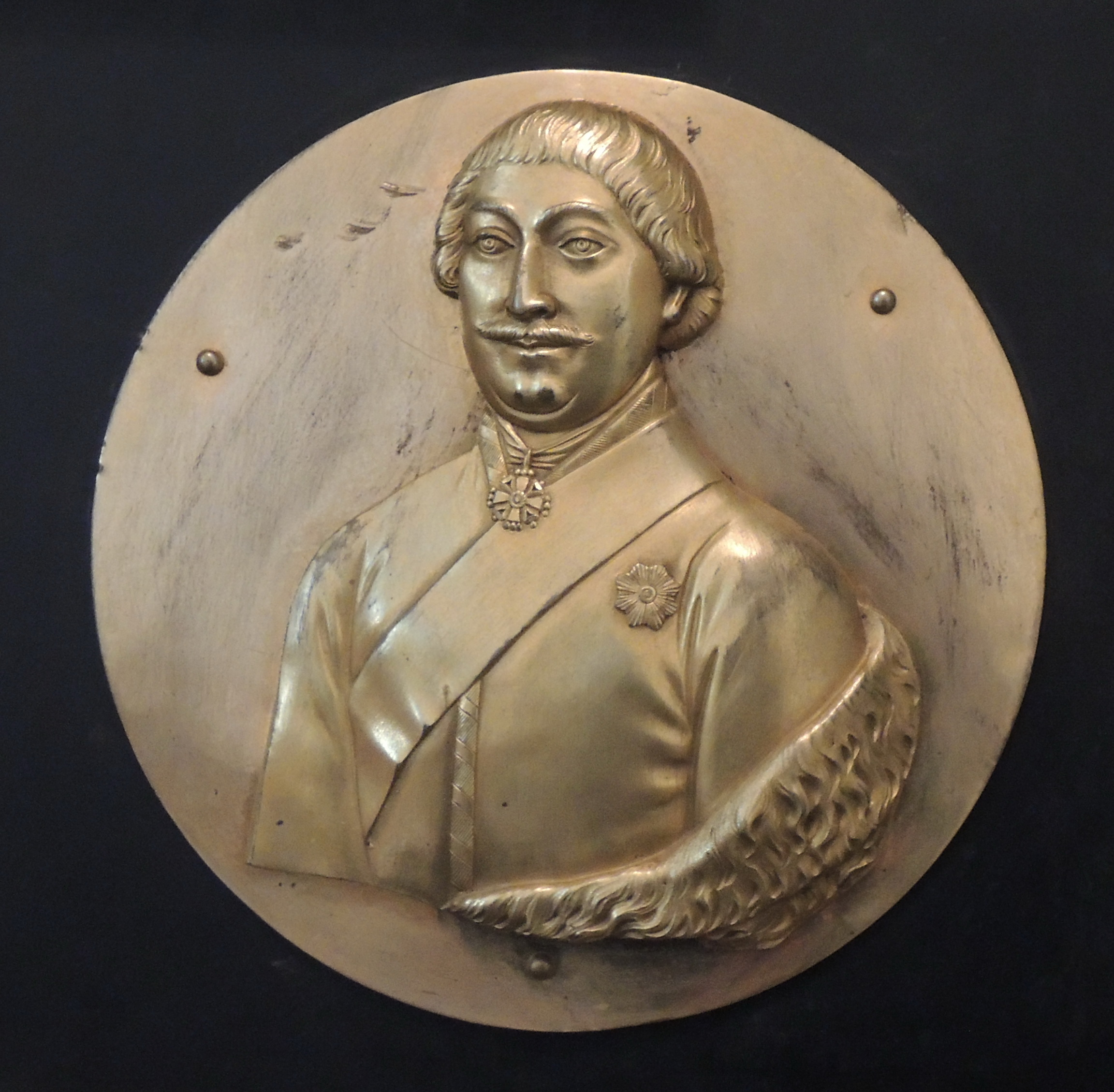
Prince Vakhtang's grave in the Blagovecshenskaya church of Alexander Nevsky Lavra.

In July 1802, when the anti-Russian opposition became more vocal in Georgia, the Russians attempted to lure Vakhtang out of Dusheti. Vakhtang escaped from his castle to the mountains of Mtiuleti, but, when the Caucasian Grenadier Regiment under the command of Major-General Sergei Tuchkov advanced into the area, he surrendered on 10 August 1802 to avoid bloodshed. He was brought to Tbilisi and placed under house arrest together with his mother Darejan at the palace of Avlabari. On 19 February 1803, Vakhtang and his former foe, David, son of George XII, departed under the Russian military escort to St. Petersburg, where he died in 1814 and was interred at the Annunciation Church of the Alexander Nevsky Lavra. The epitaph in Georgian, commissioned by Vakhtang's widow, laments his having died in a foreign land, not being able to see the motherland.

During the years in Saint Petersburg, Prince Vakhtang wrote on the history and politics of his home country. His reflections on the social and political issues in Georgia were translated by a Georgian, Igor Chilayev, into Russian and published as Письма царевича Вахтанга Ираклиевича (The Letters of Prince Royal Vakhtang, son of Heraclius) in St. Petersburg in 1812. Vakhtang also authored Обозрение истории грузинскаго народа (Overview of the History of the Georgian Nation), published in St. Petersburg in 1814. A portion of it, translated by the German scholar Julius Klaproth, was published in English as "Sketch of the History of Georgia" in The Asiatic Journal in 1831.

== Family ==
Vakhtang was married twice. The identity of his first wife, of the Tsulukidze princely family, is not known. He married secondly, in 1784, Princess Mariam Andronikashvili (1769 – 27 September 1837), daughter of Prince David Andronikashvili and the Dame of the Imperial Order of Saint Catherine (1810). He had no children.

== Ancestry ==
Ancestors of Prince Vakhtang-Almaskhan of Georgia

16. Prince David of Kakheti
8. Heraclius I of Kakheti
17. Elene Diasamidze
4. Teimuraz II
18. Shermazan Cholokashvili
9. Ana Cholokashvili
2. Heraclius II of Georgia
20. Prince Levan of Kartli
10. Vakhtang VI
21. Tuta Gurieli
5. Tamar of Kartli
22. Kelchiko of Kabarda
11. Rusudan of Circassia
1. Vakhtang
24. George IV Dadiani
12. Bezhan Dadiani
25. Sevdia Mikeladze
6. Katsia-Giorgi Dadiani
26. Gelovani
13. Tamar Gelovani
3. Darejan Dadiani
