= Prince Pharnavaz of Georgia =

Pharnavaz
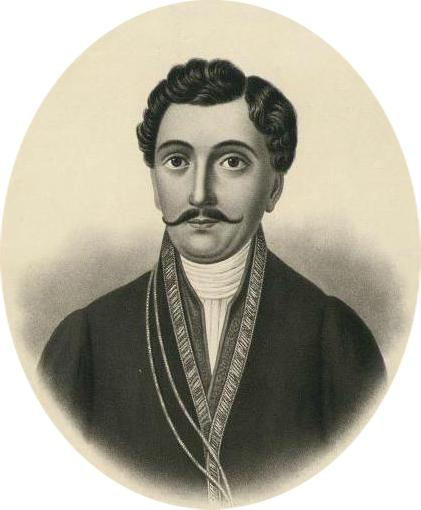
- Born: February 14, 1777; Telavi, Kingdom of Kartli-Kakheti
- Died: March 30, 1852 (aged 75); St. Petersburg, Russian Empire
- Spouse: Anna (m. 1795)
- Issue: Prince David; Princess Salome; Princess Sophio; Princess Elene; Princess Elizabeta; Princess Nino
- Dynasty: Bagrationi dynasty
- Father: Heraclius II of Georgia
- Mother: Darejan Dadiani
- Religion: Georgian Orthodox Church
- Khelrtva

Pharnavaz (Georgian: ფარნავაზი; Russian: Фарнаваз Ираклиевич Грузинский, Parnavaz Irakliyevich Gruzinsky) (14 February 1777 – 30 March 1852) was a Georgian prince (batonishvili) of the Bagrationi dynasty, the 14th son of Heraclius II, the penultimate king of Kartli and Kakheti, by his third marriage to Queen Darejan Dadiani. Pharnavaz tried to challenge the recently established Imperial Russian rule in Georgia and in 1804 headed an unsuccessful insurrection of the Georgian mountaineers in the course of which he was arrested and deported to Russia. Afterwards, he spent most of his life in St. Petersburg, becoming the first Georgian translator of the 18th-century French philosopher Jean-Jacques Rousseau.

== Involvement in civil unrest ==
Pharnavaz's active involvement in the politics of his country came with the accession of his half-brother, George XII, to the throne of Kartli and Kakheti after the death of Heraclius II in 1798. George reversed the rule of succession approved in 1791 by Heraclius under the influence of Queen Darejan, requiring the king's successor to pass the throne not to his offspring, but to his eldest brother. This would have made Parnaoz the 6th in the line of succession, behind George and his elder brothers, Iulon, Vakhtang, Mirian, and Alexander. Instead, the new monarch, having renewed quest for Russian protection, obtained from Paul I of Russia recognition of his son, David, as heir-apparent on 18 April 1799. This gave rise to a dynastic dispute, in which Pharnavaz stood by Iulon's side.

By July 1800, the crisis had taken on the characteristics of a military conflict. Pharnavaz joined his brothers, Iulon and Vakhtang, in blocking the roads to the capital city of Tbilisi in an attempt to rescue their mother, Queen Dowager Darejan, who had been forced by George XII into confinement at her own palace in Avlabari. Parnaoz threatened Gori and the king ordered Prince Otar Amilakhvari to defend the town at all cost. The arrival of additional Russian troops under Major-General Vasily Gulyakov in September 1800 in Tbilisi made George XII's position relatively secure and the rebellious princes withdrew to the provinces. Pharnavaz took control of the important fortress of Surami and began to fortify it, while another of his brothers, the bellicose Prince Alexander, fled to Dagestan to rally the Avars for his cause.

== Anti-Russian rebel ==
After the death of George XII in December 1800 the Russians prevented his heir David from acceding to the throne and went ahead with the outright annexation of Georgia to the Russian Empire. The Russian commander in Georgia, General Ivan Lazarev, requested that all the members of the royal house should assemble and remain in Tbilisi. In April 1801 Iulon and Parnaoz defied the order and fled to western Georgia, to the court of their sisterly nephew, King Solomon II of Imereti, who had upheld Iulon's claim to the throne of Kartli and Kakheti.

After a series of attempts to induce the Georgians to rise against the Russian rule, Iulon and Pharnavaz eventually crossed, in June 1804, into Kartli, where the Georgian and Ossetian peasants had revolted. The princes failed to make their way to join the rebels and fell back to Imereti. A Russian detachment, commanded by Captain Novitsky and guided by the loyal Georgian prince Giorgi Amirejibi, hurried from Tskhinvali and surprised Iulon's sleeping men at the Imeretian border. In a brief skirmish on 24 June 1804, Iulon was captured, barely escaping death, and sent in custody to Tbilisi. Pharnavaz fled to the Iranian-controlled territory, but soon returned to reignite the revolt among the Georgian highlanders and the Ossetians, living on both sides of the Greater Caucasus crest.

Initial successes of the rebels were reversed by the resolute action of Major General Pyotr Nesvetayev in September 1804. Nesvetayev foiled Pharnavaz's attempt to prevent the fall of Stepantsminda to the Russians, defeated his forces at Sioni, and, pursuing the retreating prince down to the Terek valley, quickly seized his main base at Ananuri. Pharnavaz, with his 30 followers, including the young prince Alexander Chavchavadze, the future poet and general of the Russian army, attempted to fight his way to Erivan, but was apprehended in October 1804, while fording the Kura at Demurchasaly, some 43 km south of Tbilisi, by Mustafa agha Arif, ruler of Kazakh sultanate who handed him over to a Russian "flying detachment" commanded by his wife's relative, Brigadier Prince Tamaz Orbeliani.

== Life in Russia ==
Prince Pavel Tsitsianov, the Russian commander in Georgia, captured Pharnavaz and Iulon on 4 April 1805; he had Pharnavaz deported to Voronezh and Iulon sent to Tula. Accompanied by his wife and four daughters, Parnaoz later obtained a permission to move to St. Petersburg, where he settled permanently. During his exile in Voronezh, he went blind translating into Georgian the works of Jean-Jacques Rousseau. Pharnavaz was also a poet of some talent. His best known writings, particularly, his poem "All of you, remember bygone times" (იგონეთ ყოველთა დრონი წინარე), were imbued with the language of lament for his lost kingdom. He died in 1852, having outlived his wife and four of his six children. He was buried at the Church of St. Theodore, the Alexander Nevsky Lavra.

== Family ==
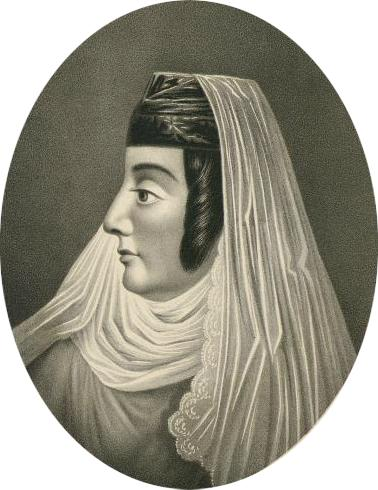
Princess Anna of Ksani, wife of Prince Pharnavaz.

Prince Pharnavaz married in 1795 Princess Anna of Ksani (1777 – 25 May 1850), daughter of Prince George, the last Duke of Ksani.

She was the Dame of the Lesser Cross of the Order of St. Catherine (1841), died at St. Petersburg, and was buried at the Alexander Nevsky Lavra.

The couple had one son and five daughters:

- Prince David. He died in infancy.
- Princess Salome (1797 – 20 August 1860), Maid of Honor to the Empress of Russia. She died unmarried at St. Petersburg.
- Princess Sophio (1798 – ?). She died very young.
- Princess Elene (1799 – 7 July 1867), Maid of Honor to the Empress of Russia. She died unmarried at Tsarskoye Selo.
- Princess Elisabed (4 October 1800 – 21 December 1819). She died unmarried at St. Petersburg and was buried at the Alexander Nevsky Lavra.
- Princess Nino (28 September 1802 – 1 September 1828), Dame of the Lesser Cross of the Order of St. Catherine (1833). She married in 1822, as his first wife, Colonel Prince Alexander Dadiani (1800 – 1865) and had one son, Nikolay (1824 – 1829). She is buried at the Alexander Nevsky Lavra.

== Ancestry ==
Ancestors of Prince Pharnavaz of Georgia

16. Prince David of Kakheti
8. Heraclius I of Kakheti
17. Elene Diasamidze
4. Teimuraz II
18. Shermazan Cholokashvili
9. Ana Cholokashvili
2. Heraclius II of Georgia
20. Prince Levan of Kartli
10. Vakhtang VI
21. Tuta Gurieli
5. Tamar of Kartli
22. Kelchiko of Kabarda
11. Rusudan of Circassia
1. Parnaoz
24. George IV Dadiani
12. Bezhan Dadiani
25. Sevdia Mikeladze
6. Katsia-Giorgi Dadiani
26. Gelovani
13. Tamar Gelovani
3. Darejan Dadiani
