= Vakhtang, Duke of Aragvi =

Vakhtang the Good

Duke of Aragvi
- Reign: 1747–1760
- Predecessor: Bezhan
- Successor: Prince Levan
- Regent: Jimsher Cholokashvili
- Born: 1742
- Died: 1760 (aged 17–18); Tbilisi
- Spouse: Ketevan of Mukhrani
- Dynasty: Bagrationi
- Father: Heraclius II of Georgia
- Mother: Ketevan Pkheidze
- Religion: Georgian Orthodox Church

Vakhtang the Good (Georgian: ვახტანგ კარგი, romanized: vakht'ang k'argi; 1742–1760 (Note: Alternatively: 1738 – 1 February 1756)) was a Georgian royal prince (batonishvili) of the Bagrationi dynasty, he was also Duke (eristavi) of the Duchy of Aragvi from 1747 until his death.

== Biography ==
Vakhtang was the first child and the eldest son of Heraclius II, then-prince of Kakheti, born of his first marriage to Ketevan Orbeliani or, according to more recent research, Ketevan Pkheidze. He was born at the time when eastern Georgia was reconquered by the resurgent ruler Nader Shah from the Ottoman Empire and the native monarchies in both eastern Georgian kingdoms, Kartli and Kakheti, were still dormant. In 1744, Nader Shah recognized Heraclius and his father Teimuraz II as kings of Kakheti and Kartli, respectively. Thereby, Vakhtang became heir apparent to the throne of Kakheti.

Furthermore, in 1747, Vakhtang was bestowed by his grandfather Teimuraz II with the fief of Aragvi, the hereditary duke (eristavi) of which, Bezhan, was murdered by the rebellious peasants in 1743. Henceforth, the duchy of Aragvi passed in possession of the royal family. As Vakhtang was still a minor, the duchy was run on his behalf by Prince Jimsher Cholokashvili, who had to deal with a peasant revolt and Dagestani inroads. Vakhtang, presumptive heir of Heraclius II and considered by many to be the hope for a Georgian reunification, died prematurely of smallpox in 1760 or on February 1756, and Aragvi was granted to his half-brother, Levan.

== Family ==
Prince Vakhtang was married to Ketevan (20 February 1744 – 4 March 1808), daughter of Constantine III, Prince of Mukhrani. The couple had no children. Ketevan died in Saint Petersburg on 4 March 1808 and was buried at the Saint Alexander Nevsky Monastery.

== Ancestry ==
Ancestors of Vakhtang, Duke of Aragvi

16. Prince David of Kakheti
8. Heraclius I of Kakheti
17. Helen Diasamidze
4. Teimuraz II
18. Shermazan Cholokashvili
9. Ana Cholokashvili
2. Heraclius II of Georgia
20. Prince Levan of Kartli
10. Vakhtang VI
21. Tuta Gurieli
5. Tamar of Kartli
22. Kelchiko of Kabarda
11. Rusudan of Circassia
1. Vakhtang
24. Khosia Pkheidze
12. Vakhushti Pkheidze
6. Zaal Pkheidze
13. Marekhi Gogoberidze or Ana Chiladze
3. Ketevan Pkheidze

== Bibliography ==
- Brosset, Marie-Félicité (1857). Histoire moderne de la Géorgie [Modern History of Georgia] (in French). Saint Petersburg: Imperial Academy of Sciences.
