= Princess Ketevan of Georgia =

Georgian princess

Ketevan (Georgian: ქეთევანი; 1764 – 5 July 1840) was a Georgian princess royal (batonishvili), a daughter of Heraclius II of Georgia, and the wife of Ioane, Prince of Mukhrani. Like her sisters, Mariami and Tekle, Ketevan was a poet of some talent and wrote in the spirit of early Romanticism.

== Biography ==
Princess Ketevan was born in 1764 in the family of Heraclius II and his third wife Darejan Dadiani. She married, c. 1781, Ioane, Prince of Mukhrani (1755–1801), a prominent military and political figure of that time. After the Georgian kingdom was annexed by the Russian Empire in 1801, Ketevan was dispossessed of a hereditary village, Karaleti, near Gori. She was suspected by the Russian commander in Georgia, Prince Pavel Tsitsianov, of being implicated in the 1804 rebellion raised by the members of the ousted royal family of Georgia. The Russian agents, further, intercepted the letters (firman) sent by Fath-Ali Shah Qajar of Persia and addressed to the Georgian dignitaries, including Ketevan's son Constantine. As a result, Tsitsianov had Ketevan briefly arrested in 1805. During her imprisonment the princess wrote a lyric, "Alas how shall I say?" (ჰოი, ვითარ ვსთქვა), which uses Romanticist imagery to represent the collapse of the Georgian monarchy: she sees "a little cloud darkening Asia's stars, lying waste happy palaces, not letting beautiful gardens boom."

== Family ==
Ketevan had 7 children of her marriage to Ioane, Prince of Mukhrani. These were:

- Prince Constantine IV (1782–7 September 1842), the last Prince of Mukhrani and lieutenant-general in the Russian service; married Pss Horeshan Guramishvili (1786-1831)
- Prince Teimuraz (1784–1833); married firstly Princess Orbeliani (d. 1820); married secondly Ekaterina Artyomovna Akimova (+before 1827)
- Prince Grigol (1787–25 February 1861), major-general in the Russian service; married Princess Mariam Tsereteli (1807-1877)
- Princess Barbara (1790–24 July 1843); married Prince Tornike Eristavi of Ksani (1770-1860)
- Prince David (1793–22 May 1878); married Princess Sofia Solomonovna Mkhargrdzeli-Argutashvili (died 1834)
- Princess Tamar (1798–1851); married Prince Zachari Palavandishvili (b. 1796)
- Prince Irakli (1800–c. 1816).

Burke's Peerage's version of Ketevan's second marriage to Prince Abel Andronikashvili is not accepted as credible by more recent genealogies of the Georgian royal house.

== Ancestry ==
Ancestors of Princess Ketevan of Georgia

16. Prince David of Kakheti
8. Heraclius I of Kakheti
17. Elene Diasamidze
4. Teimuraz II
18. Shermazan Cholokashvili
9. Ana Cholokashvili
2. Heraclius II of Georgia
20. Prince Levan of Kartli
10. Vakhtang VI
21. Tuta Gurieli
5. Tamar of Kartli
22. Kelchiko of Kabarda
11. Rusudan of Circassia
1. Ketevan
24. George IV Dadiani
12. Bezhan Dadiani
25. Sevdia Mikeladze
6. Katsia-Giorgi Dadiani
26. Gelovani
13. Tamar Gelovani
3. Darejan Dadiani
