= Irakli =

Irakli, Irakly (Georgian: ირაკლი), or Erekle (Georgian: ერეკლე) is a Georgian version of the Greek name Heracles, and is a popular masculine name in Georgia.

Notable people with these names include:

== Erekle ==
- Erekle I, Prince of Mukhrani (1560–1605), Georgian nobleman
- Prince Erekle of Kakheti (1568–1589), Georgian prince
- Erekle I of Kartli (1642–1709), ruler in Georgia
- Erekle II, Prince of Mukhrani (1666–1723), Georgian nobleman
- Erekle II (1720–1798), ruler in Georgia

== Irakli ==
- Irakli Abashidze (1909–1992), Georgian poet, literary scholar and politician
- Irakli Abuseridze (born 1977), Georgian rugby player
- Irakli Alasania (born 1973), Georgian politician, soldier and diplomat
- Irakly Andronikov (1908–1990), Russian literature historian, philologist, and media personality
- Irakli Bagration of Mukhrani (1909–1977), Georgian prince
- Irakli Bolkvadze (born 1994), Georgian swimmer
- Irakli Garibashvili (born 1982), 11th Prime Minister of Georgia
- Irakli Charkviani (1961–2006), Georgian poet, writer, and musician
- Irakli Chkhikvadze (born 1987), Georgian rugby player
- Iraklii Danylovych (c. 1223-1240), Ruthenian prince
- Irakli Giorgadze (born 1982), Georgian rugby player
- Irakli Gruzinsky (1826–1882), Georgian prince
- Irakli Kakabadze (born c. 1969), Georgian human rights activist
- Irakli Klimiashvili (born 1988), Georgian footballer
- Irakli Kobakhidze (born 1978), 16th Prime Minister of Georgia
- Irakli Kobalia (born 1992), Georgian footballer
- Irakli Kvekveskiri (born 1990), Georgian footballer
- Irakli Labadze (born 1981), Georgian tennis player
- Irakli Logua (born 1991), Russian footballer
- Irakli Machkhaneli (born 1981), Georgian rugby player
- Irakli Menagarishvili (born 1951), Georgian politician and diplomat
- Irakli Modebadze (born 1984), Georgian footballer
- Irakli Mosidze, Georgian wrestler
- Irakli Murjikneli (born 1983), Georgian Opera Singer (Tenor)
- Irakli Ochiauri (1924–2015), Georgian painter and sculptor
- Irakli Okruashvili (born 1973), Georgian politician
- Irakli Revishvili (born 1989), Georgian swimmer
- Irakly Shanidze (born 1968), Georgian creative director and photographer
- Irakli Sirbiladze (born 1982), Georgian footballer
- Irakli Tsereteli (1881–1959), Georgian politician
- Irakli Tsirekidze (born 1982), Georgian judoka
- Irakli Turmanidze (born 1984), Georgian weightlifter
- Irakli Zirakashvili (born 1998), Georgian armwrestler

== See also ==
- Irakli (beach), on the Black Sea in Bulgaria
- Society of Erekle II, a Georgian NGO
