= Ketevan Orbeliani =

Ketevan Orbeliani (Georgian: ქეთევან ორბელიანი; died 1750) was a Georgian princess of the House of Orbeliani. She was betrothed to Prince Heraclius, of the royal house of Kakheti and the future king of Georgia, in 1738, but the union was repudiated by Heraclius himself. Traditional genealogy considered her to have been the first wife of Heraclius until their divorce in 1744 and the mother of two of his children. More recent version, now widely accepted among the historians of Georgia, has it that Heraclius did not actually marry Princess Orbeliani, but disowned the engagement and took Ketevan, daughter of Prince Zaal Pkheidze, as his first legitimate wife in 1740.

== Engagement ==
Ketevan was born into one of the leading noble families of the Kingdom of Kartli. Her father, Prince Vakhtang Orbeliani-Qaplanishvili (born 1705), was a diplomat and writer. He had penned his experience while living in the Russian Empire (1735–1738) in his Description of Peterhof and also authored several poems. In 1738 Ketevan was betrothed to Heraclius, a prince of the royal house of Kakheti, who was then accompanying his suzerain, Nader Shah of Iran, in the Afghan campaign. The betrothal was arranged through the efforts of Heraclius's mother, Tamar, with the help of Ketevan's paternal aunt, Bangua, who was married to the influential Georgian nobleman, Givi Amilakhvari (1689–1754).

== Repudiation ==
Returning to Kakheti in September 1739, however, Heraclius repudiated the union and Ketevan withdrew to a monastery. She died very young, in 1750, at the village of Patardzeuli. The epitaph on her grave at the Alaverdi Monastery speaks of her as the consort of Heraclius. Ketevan had, thus, been considered to have been the first wife of Heraclius until their divorce in 1744 and the mother of two of his children, Princess Rusudan (died in infancy) and Prince Vakhtang. This tradition, founded by Marie-Félicité Brosset and followed, among others, by Cyril Toumanoff, was revised by the Georgian historians in the latter half of the 20th century. This version, based on the account of Heraclius's grandson, Alexander Orbeliani, has it that the engagement between Heraclius and Ketevan had been repudiated before the marriage was consummated and the first wife of Heraclius—and the mother of his two older children—was another woman, also named Ketevan (died 1744), daughter of Zaal Pkheidze, of the Imeretian princely family of Pkheidze (Mkheidze).

== Ancestry ==
Ancestors of Ketevan Orbeliani

16. Kaplan Orbeliani (?–1671)
8. Vakhtang Orbeliani (?–1695)
17. Tamar, daughter of the Meskhian amilakhor
4. Vakhushti Orbeliani (?–1707)
9. N., daughter of Zaal, Duke of Aragvi; Tamar, daughter of Nodar Tsitsishvili
2. Vakhtang Orbeliani (1705–?)
5. N. Orbeliani
1. Ketevan Orbeliani (?–1750)
24. Bezhan Chkheidze (fl. 1619–1650)
12. Kaikhosro Chkheidze (fl. 1653–1700)
6. Sekhnia Chkheidze (fl. 1688–1746)
3. Ana-Khanum Chkheidze (fl. 1729–1752)

Royal titles
Preceded by Tamar of Kartli	Queen consort of Kakheti; 1744	Succeeded by Ana Abashidze
