= Ketevan Pkheidze =

Queen consort of Kakheti
- Tenure: 1744
- Died: 1744; Telavi
- Burial: Alaverdi Monastery
- Spouse: Heraclius II of Georgia (m. 1740)
- Issue: Princess Rusudan; Vakhtang, Duke of Aragvi
- House: Pkheidze
- Father: Zaal Pkheidze
- Religion: Georgian Orthodox Church

Ketevan Pkheidze (Georgian: ქეთევან ფხეიძე; died 1744) was a Georgian princess of an ancient House of Pkheidze (also known as Mkheidze) hailing from Imereti. She was the first legitimate wife of Heraclius II, then King of Kakheti and the future king of Kartli‐Kakheti.

== Biography ==
Ketevan Pkheidze was born into a princely family in Imereti, a kingdom in western Georgia, tracing their origin to the 11th century. The branch to which Ketevan belonged had their estate centered at the village of Zedubani. Her father was Prince Zaal Pkheidze. She also had a sister who was married off into the House of Chkheidze, ruling family of the Duchy of Racha; her name is not recorded.

Ketevan married Heraclius II in 1740, shortly after the prince repudiated his engagement (or actual marriage according to traditional accounts of Prince Vakhushti, Marie-Félicité Brosset, and Cyril Toumanoff) with Princess Ketevan Orbeliani, who thereafter retired to a monastery. In 1744, Heraclius was crowned king of Kakheti. Whoever was his consort, Heraclius had two children of his first marriage, Princess Rusudan (died in infancy) and Prince Vakhtang. Ketevan died of a severe illness in Telavi, being mourned by Heraclius and his father Teimuraz II, King of Kartli, who had arrived in Kakheti only to find his daughter-in-law dead. Her remains were taken and rested at the Alaverdi Monastery. A year later, Heraclus married secondly to Princess Anna Abashidze.

== Ancestry ==
Ancestors of Ketevan Pkheidze

16. Piran Pkheidze (fl. 1651)
8. Khosia Pkheidze (fl. 1660–81)
4. Vakhushti Pkheidze (fl. 1696–1714)
2. Zaal Pkheidze (fl. 1739–46)
5. Marekhi Ghoghoberidze; or Ana Chiladze
1. Ketevan Pkheidze (?–1744)

Royal titles
Preceded by Tamar of Kartli	Queen consort of Kakheti; 1744	Succeeded by Ana Abashidze
