= Anna Abashidze =

Queen of Kakheti from 1745 to 1749

Queen consort of Kakheti
- Tenure: 1745–1749
- Born: 1730
- Died: 7 December 1749 (aged 18–19); Tbilisi, Kingdom of Kakheti
- Burial: Svetitskhoveli Cathedral, Mtskheta
- Spouse: Heraclius II of Georgia (m. 1745)
- Issue: George XII; Princess Tamar; Unnamed daughter
- House: Abashidze
- Father: Zaal Abashidze
- Religion: Georgian Orthodox Church

Anna Abashidze (Georgian: ანა აბაშიძე; 1730 – 7 December 1749) was a Georgian princess of the Abashidze family and Queen Consort of Kakheti as the second wife of King Heraclius II whom she married in 1745. She was the mother of George XII, the last king of Georgia.

== Biography ==
Princess Anna was born in 1730 into one of the leading noble houses of Imereti, a kingdom in western Georgia. Her father was Prince Zaal Abashidze. Anna had two brothers, Ioane and Simon. The former served as a governor (mouravi) of Borchalo and a chief of royal guards (kechikchibashi) from 1769 to 1799 and saw action against the Persians at Krtsanisi in 1795. The latter was a keeper of the royal seal (mordali).

Anna married Heraclius II as his second wife in 1745. Her predecessor was either Ketevan Orbeliani, whom Heraclius divorced, or, according to more recent research, Ketevan Pkheidze, who died of a severe illness in 1744. The marriage was arranged by Heraclius's maternal aunt, Princess Anuka, who was married to an Abashidze. The wedding was first pompously celebrated at Anuka's house in Kvishkheti and then at the court of Heraclius's father, Teimuraz II, in Tbilisi. Anna died in Tbilisi at the age of 19 and was interred at the Svetitskhoveli Cathedral in Mtskheta. A year later, in 1750, Heraclius married his third and last wife, Darejan Dadiani.

== Children ==
Heraclius and Anna had three children:

- George XII (10 November 1746 – 28 December 1800), who succeeded Heraclius II as king of Kartli and Kakheti,
- Princess Tamar (12 July 1747 – 4 August 1786), who married Prince David Orbeliani.
- An anonymous daughter, who died in infancy.

== Ancestry ==
Ancestors of Anna Abashidze

16. Paata Abashidze
8. Levan Abashidze
4. Zurab Abashidze
18. Zaal, Eristavi of Aragvi
9. Tinatin Eristavi
19. N. Chkheidze
2. Zaal Abashidze
1. Anna Abashidze

Royal titles
Preceded by Ketevan Orbeliani or Ketevan Pkheidze	Queen consort of Kakheti; 1745–1749	Succeeded by Darejan Dadiani
