= Darejan Dadiani =

Queen of Georgia from 1750 to 1798

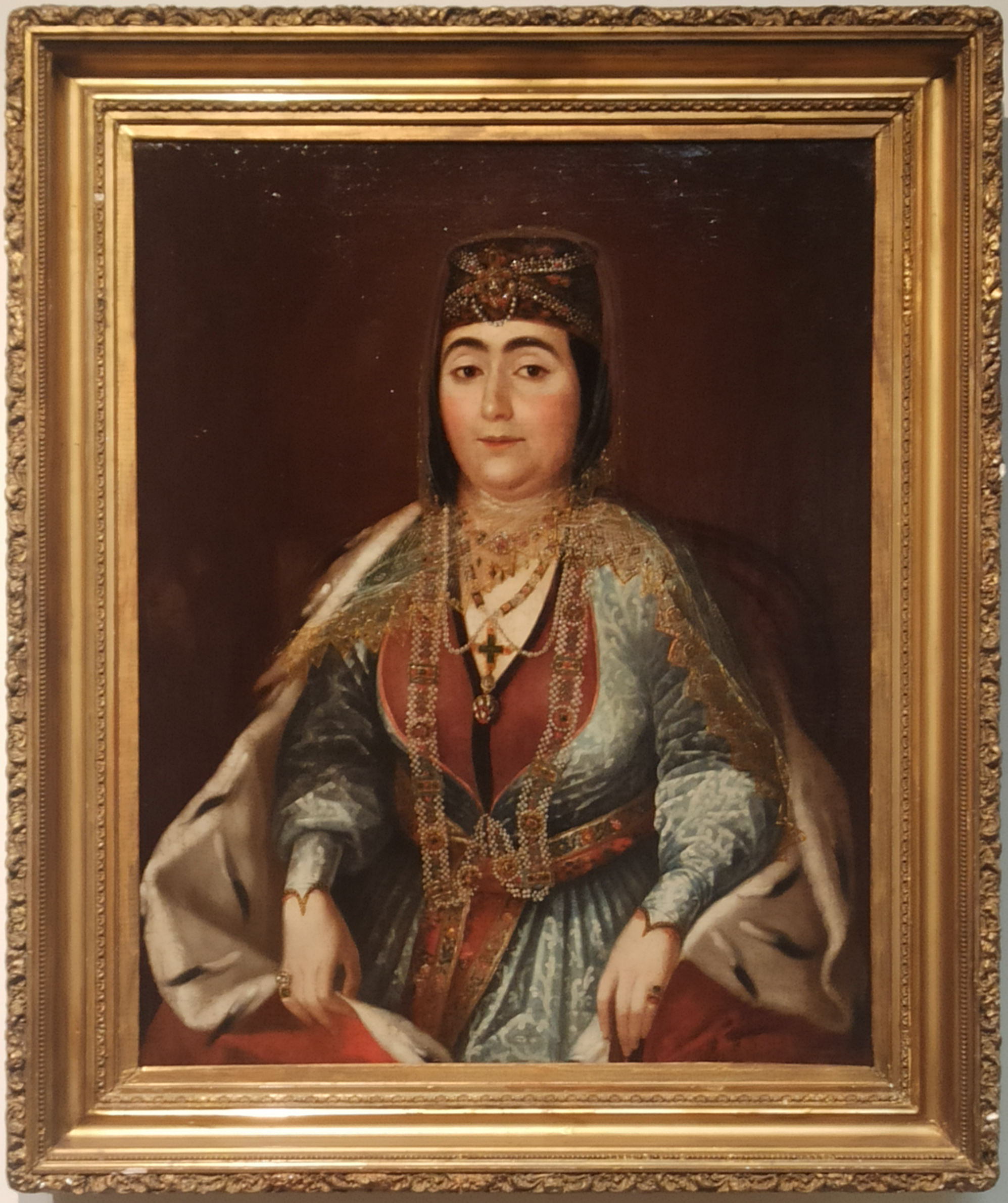
- Portrait of Darejan Dadiani

Queen consort of Kartli and Kakheti
- Tenure: 1762–1798

Queen consort of Kakheti
- Tenure: 1750–1762
- Born: 20 July 1734; Principality of Mingrelia
- Died: 8 November 1807 (aged 73); St. Petersburg, Russian Empire
- Burial: Annunciation Church, Alexander Nevsky Lavra
- Spouse: Heraclius II of Georgia (m. 1750; died 1798)
- Issue among others...: Princess Helen; Princess Mariam; Prince Levan; Prince Iulon; Prince Vakhtang-Almaskhan; Catholicos-Patriarch Antonius II; Princess Anastasia; Princess Ketevan; Prince Mirian; Prince Alexander; Princess Thecla; Prince Parnaoz
- Dynasty: Dadiani
- Father: Katsia-Giorgi Dadiani
- Religion: Georgian Orthodox Church

Darejan Dadiani (Georgian: დარეჯანი), also known as Daria (Georgian: დარია; Russian: Дарья Георгиевна, romanized: Darya Georgyevna; 20 July 1734 – 8 November 1807), was Queen Consort of Kakheti, and later Kartli-Kakheti in Eastern Georgia, as the third wife of King Heraclius II of Georgia. She was a daughter of Katsia-Giorgi Dadiani, a member of the princely house of Mingrelia. Darajan married Heraclius in 1750 and their marriage lasted 48 years until his death in 1798; the marriage produced 23 children. In the final years of her husband's reign, Darejan exerted significant influence on politics and court affairs. She was skeptical of the pro-Russian policies of Heraclius II and his successor, her step-son, George XII, whose progeny she tried to prevent from succeeding to the throne of Georgia. After the Russian annexation of Georgia, Queen Dowager Darejan was deported to Russia proper in 1803. She died in Saint Petersburg at the age of 73 and was buried at the Alexander Nevsky Lavra.

== Early life and marriage ==
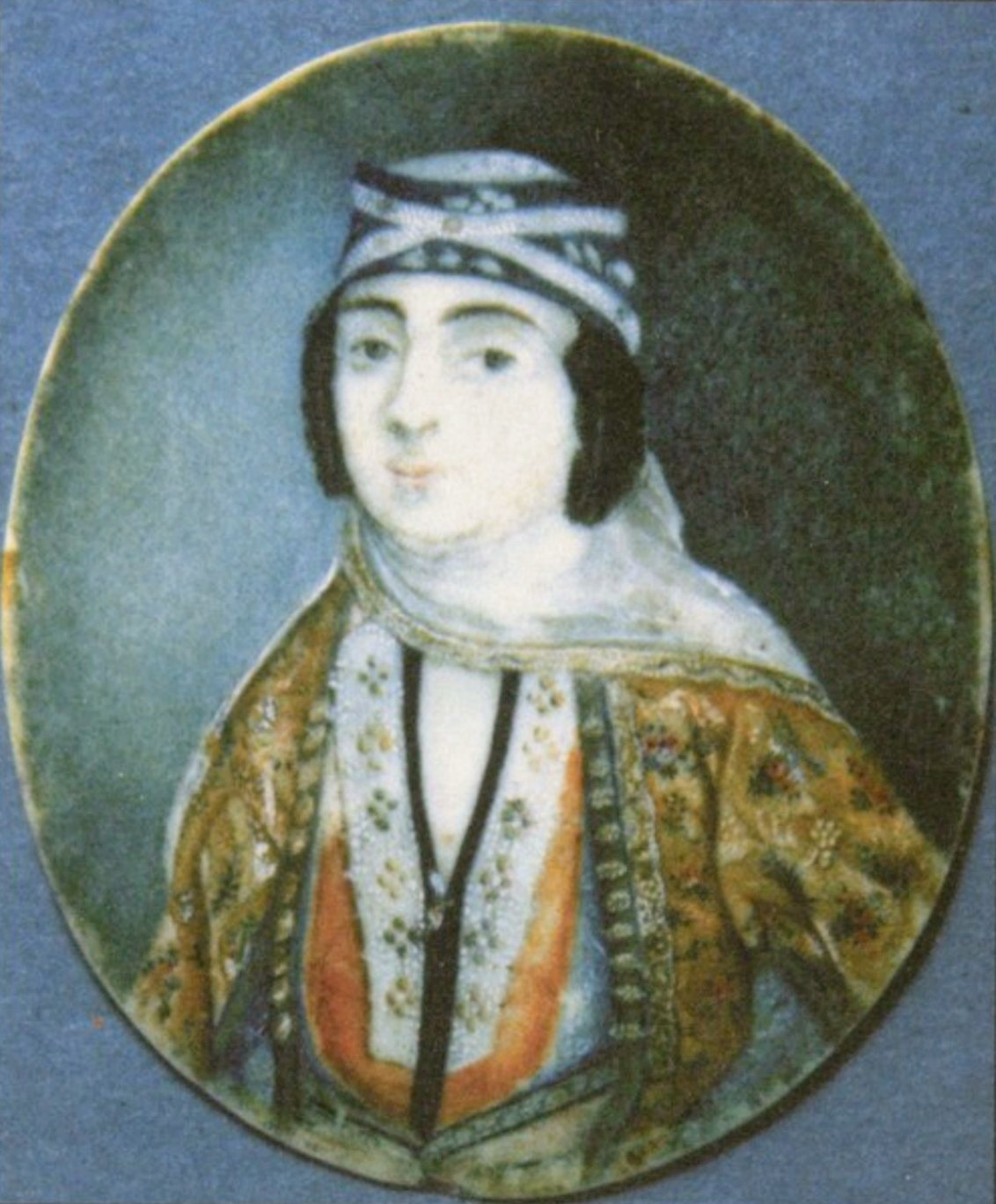
Darejan Dadiani.

Darejan was born on 20 July 1734. She was a daughter of Prince Katsia-Giorgi Dadiani, a younger son of Bezhan Dadiani, Prince of Mingrelia in western Georgia. She was 16 years old in 1750, when Heraclius, then reigning in Kakheti, chose her as his third wife, a year after his second wife, Princess Anna Abashidze, died. The marriage was negotiated on Heraclius's behalf by his relative, Princess Khoreshan Bagrationi (1705-1790), daughter of the late Jesse, King of Kartli and wife of Prince Jesse Amilakhvari (1688-1787). The bride was brought by Khoreshan and Saba, Bishop of Ninotsminda, to Surami, where Heraclius met her. The wedding was then lavishly celebrated at the court of Heraclius's father, Teimuraz II, King of Kartli, in Tbilisi. In 1762, Heraclius of Kakheti succeeded on his father's death as king of Kartli, thus uniting both eastern Georgian kingdoms into a single state.

== Issue of succession ==
The couple's first better documented child, Princess Helen, was born in 1753, followed by 22 more between 1755 and 1782. As her sons grew up, Darejan's desire to secure the right of succession for her offspring against Heraclius's eldest surviving son of his second marriage to Anna Abashidze, the Crown Prince George, became the cornerstone of Darejan's involvement in the politics of Georgia. In the last years of Heraclius II's life, she became more involved and influential. In 1791, Darejan persuaded her husband to overturn the principle of primogeniture in favor of fraternal inheritance, mandating in his will that after his death, his eldest son George would become king, but that after George's death, the throne would pass to the next surviving son of Heraclius, rather than to George's offspring. The surviving sons of Heraclius and Darejan—Iulon, Vakhtang, Mirian, Alexander, and Parnaoz—thus, emerged in the line of succession. After Heraclius's death in 1798, the now King George XII, reneged on the will of the late king, declaring it invalid on account of it being forced upon his father. This occasioned a further breakdown in already strained relations between George XII and Darejan and his half-brothers.

== Relations with Russia ==
Another conflicting issue between Darejan and her reigning step-son was Georgia's relations with the Russian Empire. Darejan had been skeptical of Georgia's rapprochement with its northern neighbour already in Heraclius's lifetime, especially after the Russians, bound by the 1783 treaty of Georgievsk to protect Heraclius's kingdom from external threat, had left the Georgians to their own devices in the face of a disastrous invasion from Iran in 1795. The queen had repeatedly maintained that the relationship with Russia had brought no benefit to Georgia.

Darejan and her party were resolutely opposed to George XII's renewed quest for the Russian protection. In 1800, one of Darejan's sons, Alexander, openly broke with his half-brother and attempted a coup with the help of his Avar and Iranian allies. The relations in the royal family hit the nadir in July 1800, when George XII forced Queen Dowager Darejan into confinement at her palace in Avlabari, prompting Darejan's sons to mobilize their loyal forces around Tbilisi.

== Downfall and exile ==
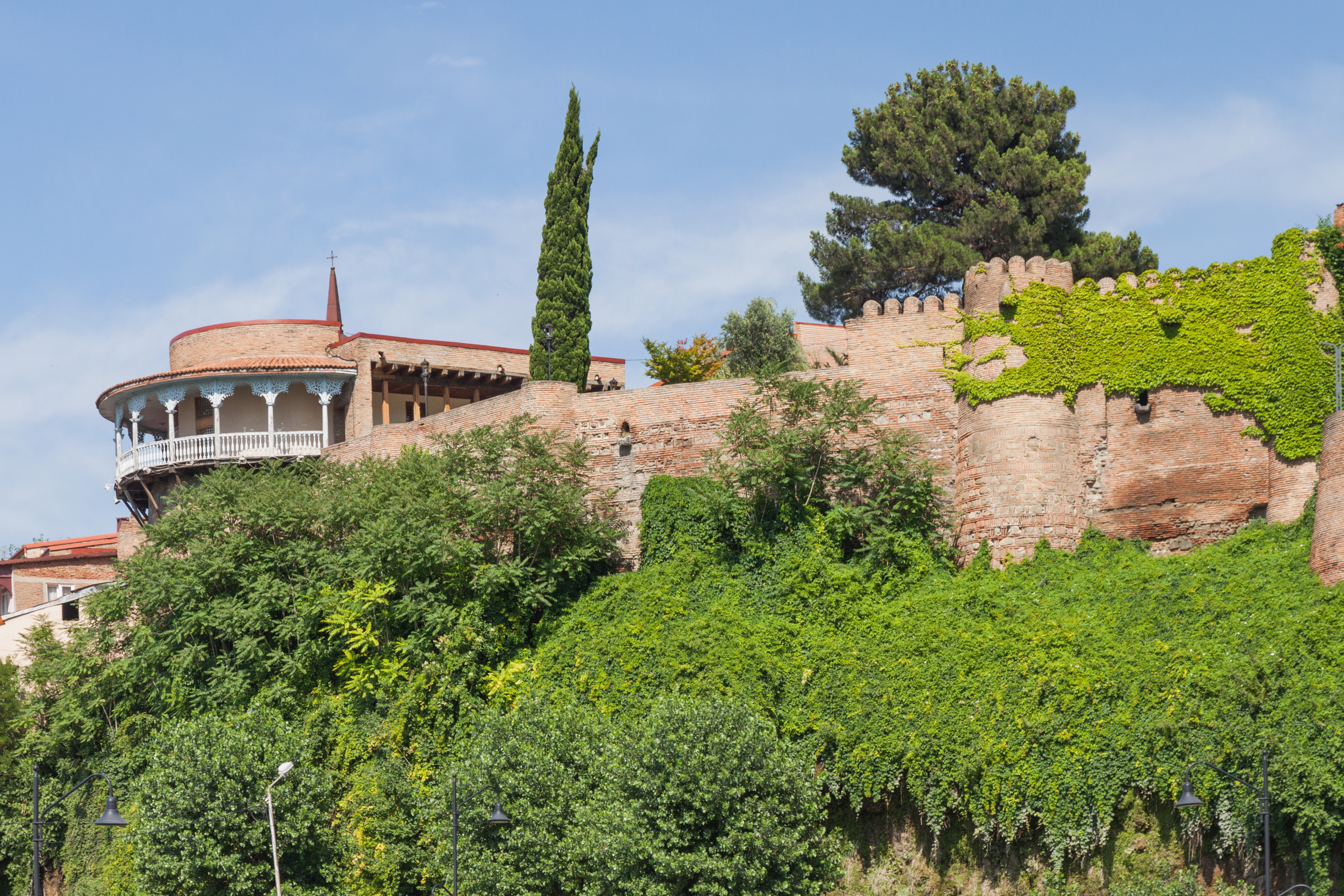
Remnants of Queen Darejan's palace in Tbilisi.

After the death of George XII in December 1800, the Russian general Ivan Lazarevich Lazarev issued the Tsar Paul I's order to all the members of the royal family, beginning with Darejan, forbidding the nomination of any heir to the throne. After Paul's death in March 1801, Darejan applied to the new tsar, Alexander I, to confirm her eldest son, Iulon, as the new king and protect her and her kin from harassment from George XII's heir Prince David and his supporters. However, the Russian government proceeded with the outright annexation of the Georgian kingdom, bringing the millennium of the Bagrationi rule in Georgia to an end.

The Queen Dowager and her sons withdrew into opposition to the new regime; Iulon, Alexander, and Parnaoz were now in open rebellion. Darejan's every trip outside Tbilisi was closely watched by the Russian military. Eventually, Tsar Alexander ordered the commander in Georgia, General Karl von Knorring, to deport all members of the royal family from Georgia for resettlement in Russia proper on 20 August 1802. The State Council confirmed the decision and instructed Knorring to "strengthen all measures for the transport of Queen Darejan and other members of the royal family to Russia, because their presence in Georgia will always be a cause and reason [for the development of] parties hostile" to the Russian hegemony. Darejan's relations with Knorring were particularly tense. Once, the general angered her by wearing his hat and coat at her house and interrupting an interview at noon, declaring it was time for his vodka.

The task of deportation was to be fulfilled by Knorring's successor, General Pavel Tsitsianov, himself of Georgian origin. In vain Darejan cited her illness to avoid exile. Tsitsianov responded that no reason would postpone her departure. She was further accused of "treasonous" correspondence with Russia's enemies and removing the venerated icon of Ancha from a church in Tbilisi. The Russian military had Darejan escorted on 25 October 1803 out of the estate of her grandson in Mukhrani to her exile in Russia.

Darejan, known to the Russians as the tsaritsa Darya Georgyevna, was allowed to settle down in Saint Petersburg, where she lived in a rented house in the parish of the Church of St. Simon and Anna. Later, the ailing queen was permitted to have a house church, which was consecrated on 22 July 1804 and closed following the death of Darejan on 8 November 1807. Darejan, Queen Dowager of Georgia and Lady of the Russian Order of Saint Catherine, Grand Cross, was buried at the Annunciation Church of the Alexander Nevsky Lavra.

== Children ==
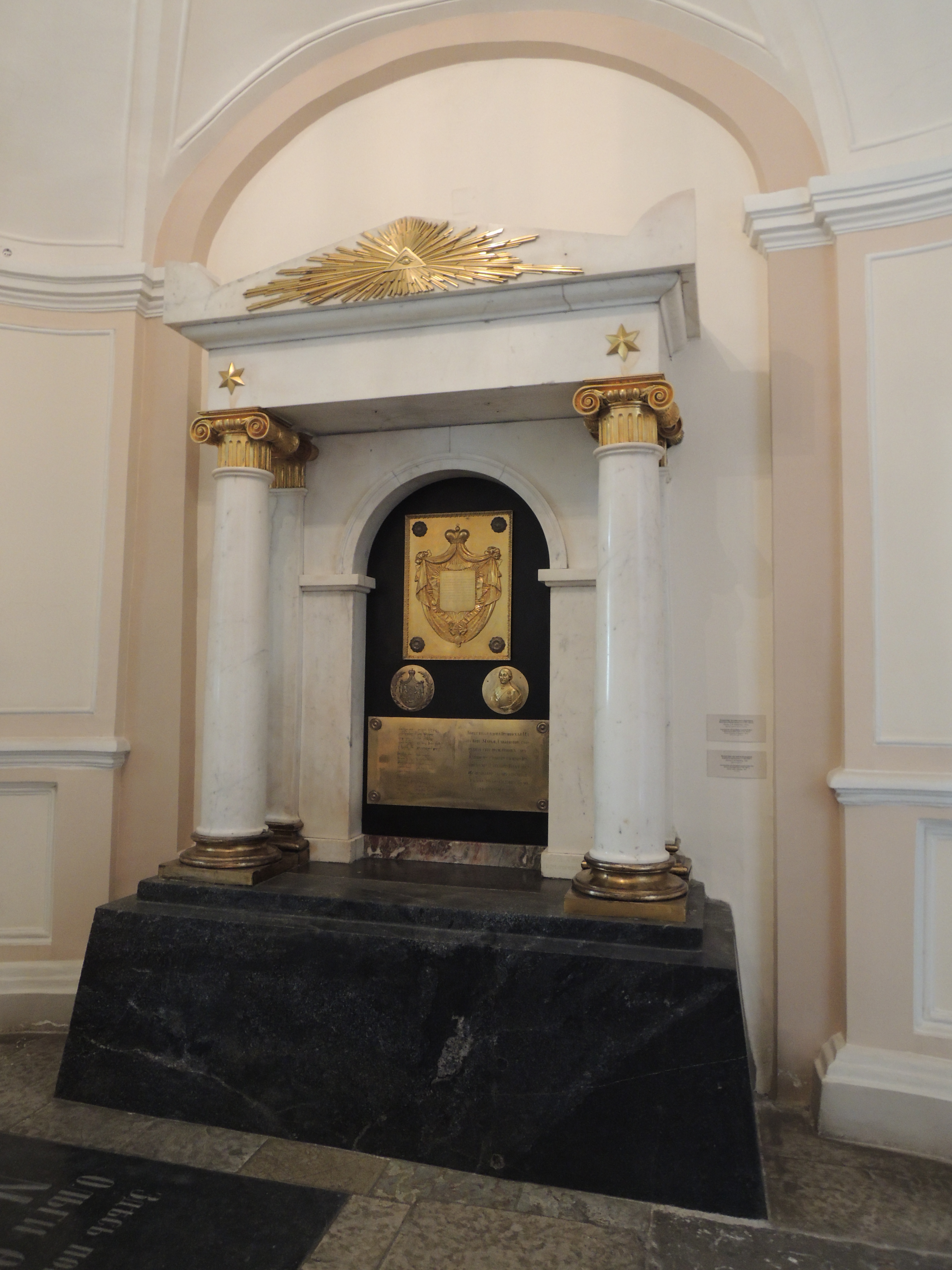
Queen Darejan's final resting place in Annunciation Church

Darejan had 23 children with Heraclius. Of these, only 13 reached adulthood.

- Princess Helen (1753–1786), who married firstly Prince Archil of Imereti; she was the mother of Solomon II of Imereti. She married secondly Prince Zakaria Andronikashvili;
- Princess Mariam (1755–1828), who married Prince David Tsitsishvili;
- Prince Levan (1756–1781), Duke of Aragvi (1766–1781);
- Princess Sophia, who died young;
- Prince Ioane, who died young;
- Prince Iulon (1760–1816), Duke of Ksani (1790–1801);
- Princess Salome, who died young;
- Prince Vakhtang-Almaskhan (1761–1814), Duke of Aragvi (1782–1801);
- Prince Beri (born 1761/62), who died young;
- Anton II of Georgia (Prince Teimuraz) (1762–1827), Catholicos-Patriarch of Georgia from 1788 to 1811;
- Princess Anastasia (1763–1838), who married Prince Revaz Eristavi of Ksani;
- Princess Ketevan (1764–1840), who married Ioane, Prince of Mukhrani;
- Prince Soslan-David, who died young;
- Prince Solomon (died 1765);
- Prince Mirian (1767–1834);
- Princess Khoreshan, who died young;
- Prince Alexander (1770–1844);
- Prince Luarsab (born 1772), who died young;
- Princess Ekaterine (1774–1818), who married Prince Giorgi Cholokashvili in 1793;
- Princess Tekle (1776–1846), who married Prince Vakhtang Orbeliani;
- Prince Parnaoz (1777–1852);
- Prince Archil (born 1780), who died young;
- An unnamed child (born 1782), who died young.

== See also ==
- List of people with the most children

== Notes ==
Royal titles
| Preceded by Ana Abashidze | Queen consort of Kakheti; 1750–1762 | Unification of Kartli and Kakheti |
| Unification of Kartli and Kakheti | Queen consort of Kartli and Kakheti; 1762–1798 | Succeeded by Mariam Tsitsishvili |
