= Treaty of the Iberians =

1790 alliance between Kartli-Kakheti and Imereti

The Treaty of the Iberians (Georgian: ივერიელთა ტრაქტატი) was a bilateral treaty on strategic alliance concluded between the Kingdom of Kartli-Kakheti and Kingdom of Imereti, Principality of Mingrelia, Principality of Guria in June, 1790. Treaty was negotiated by Prince Solomon Lionidze. Treaty was underlining the fact that "All the Iberians are blood relatives, of one religion and language." Treaty promised all-Georgian unity and mutual assistance in case of external threats. King Heraclius II of Georgia was recognized as the "father" of all Georgia that promised the western Georgian polities to help in case of need.
