= Duchy of Aragvi =

Fiefdom in medieval and early modern Georgia

Duchy of Aragvi არაგვის საერისთავო
- Principality of the Kingdom of Kartli
- 1335-1743
- Capital: Dusheti
- Area
  - Coordinates: 42°09′49″N 44°42′14″E
- Historical era: Middle Ages
  - Established: 1335
  - Disestablished: 1743
| Succeeded by |
| Kingdom of Kakheti |
- Today part of: Georgia

The Duchy of Aragvi (Georgian: არაგვის საერისთავო) was an important fiefdom in medieval and early modern Georgia, strategically located in the upper Aragvi valley, in the foothills of the eastern Greater Caucasus crest, and ruled by a succession of eristavi ("dukes") from c. 1380 until being transferred to the royal crown in 1747.

== History ==
The first known dukes of Aragvi belonged to the House of Shaburisdze which flourished in the 13th century. From this house, the duchy passed to those of Tumanisdze and, finally, in the 16th century, to the House of Sidamoni. This latter change of power took place sometime after 1569, when an obscure nobleman of the Sidamoni clan, with the aid of the dukes of the Ksani, massacred the Tumanisdze family and took control of their possessions. In the process of time, the tenure of a duke of Aragvi became hereditary, and the eristavi ranked as mtavari, one of the "undivided" princely houses of Georgia.

The dukes of Aragvi had their residences at Dusheti and Sioni, and the main fortress at Ananuri. Bodorna was their familial abbey and a burial ground. Their possessions extended from the main ridge of the Great Caucasus in the north to the left bank of the Mtkvari (Kura) in the south, and from the Liakhvi River in the west to the mountains of Alevi and Gremi in the east – which formed the watershed between the valleys of the Ksani and the Aragvi. As of the 1770 census, the duchy's population amounted to 3,300 households. The duchy controlled a vital road to the North Caucasus, which would later become the Georgian Military Road, as well as the fertile area of Bazaleti.

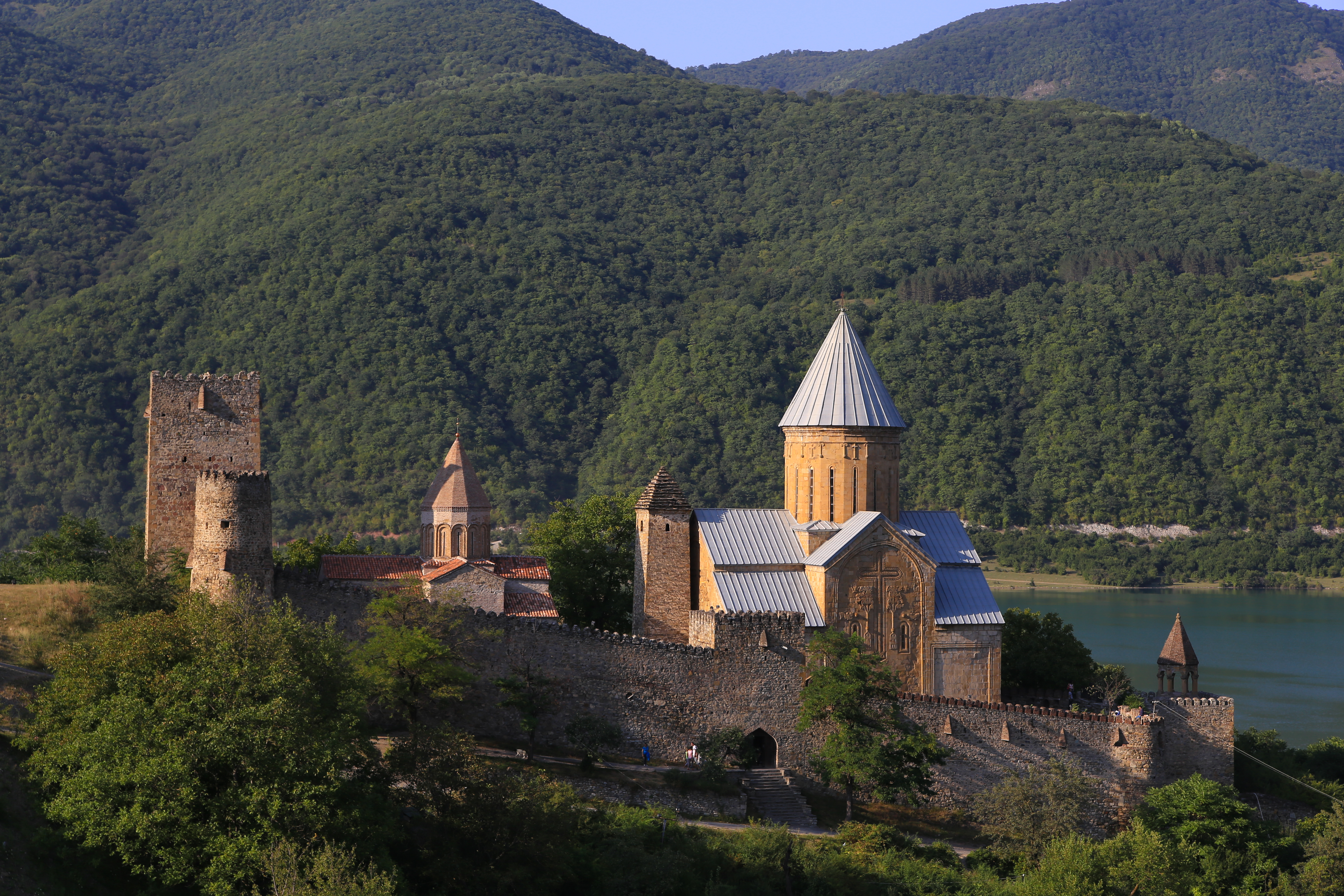
Ananuri was a castle and seat of the eristavis (Dukes) of Aragvi.

The energetic 17th-century dukes of Aragvi – Nugzar, Zurab, and Zaal – waged a relentless struggle to achieve more autonomy from the royal authority of Kartli as well as to subdue the free mountainous communities of Pshavi-Khevsureti and Ertso-Tianeti.

In 1743, the rebellious Aragvians killed their duke Bezhan and surrendered the duchy to Teimuraz II, a Georgian king of Kartli. Teimuraz converted the duchy into a royal appanage and gave it to his grandson Prince Vakhtang. The surviving members of the ducal family were later removed by Teimuraz's son Heraclius II to Kakheti and granted a smaller estate. Vakhtang died in 1756 and was succeeded by his brothers, first by Levan (died 1781), and then by Vakhtang-Almaskhan, who was sent into exile by the Russians, once they took control of Georgia, in 1803. Later, the descendants of the dukes of Aragvi attempted to restore their titles and patrimonial estates in the Aragvi valley, but to no avail. In 1828, the Russian Senate ruled their claims to be groundless.

== List of dukes of Aragvi ==
=== Shaburidze ===
- c. 1380 : Mihai
- c. 1430 : Shanshe I
- c. 1440 : Nugzar I
- c. 1465–1474 : Vameq I

=== Sidamoni ===
- 1558–1580 : Jason I
  - Founder of Sidamoni dynasty, recognized as Eristav of Aragvi by King Simeon of Georgia 1558
- 1580–1600 : Avtandil I
  - Son of Jason I
- 1600–1618 : Nugzar
  - Grandson of Jason I by brother of Avtandil I, Baadur
- 1618–1620 : Baadur I
  - Son of Nugzar I
- 1620–1631 : Zurab
  - Son of Nugzar I
- 1629–1635 : David I
  - Son of Nugzar I
- 1635–1660 : Zaal
  - Son of Nugzar I
- 1660–1666 : Otar I
  - Grandson of Nugzar I by brother of Baadur I; George
- 1666–1687 : Revaz I
  - Son of Nugzar I
- 1687-1688 : Jason II
  - Grandson of Nugzar I by brother of Baadur I; George (brother of Otar I)
- 1688–1696, 1703–1723 : George
  - Son of Otar I
- 1696–1703 : Baadur II
  - Son of Otar I
- 1723–1724 : Otar II
  - Son of George
- 1724–1730 : Teimuraz I
  - Son of Jason II, first cousin once removed of Otar II
- 1730–1735 : Revaz II
  - Son of George
- 1735–1739 : Bardzim I
  - Son of George

Pretenders/Anti-Eristavi

- 1729-1742 : Revaz III
- 1742-1743 : Bezhan I

(Both installed by the Turks)

=== Non-dynastic ===
- 1743–1747 : Givi II, Prince Amilakhvari
- 1747 : Annexion by the Kingdom of Kakheti

=== Bagrationi appanage ===
- 1747–1756: Prince Vakhtang of Georgia
- 1756–1766: Vacant (royal domain)
- 1766–1781: Prince Levan of Georgia (1756–1781)
- 1782–1801: Prince Vakhtang-Almaskhan of Georgia
- 1801: annexation by Russia.
