= Society of Erekle II =

Non-government organization in Georgia, United States

The Society of Erekle II (Georgian: ერეკლე მეორეს საზოგადოება) is a Georgian non-government organisation established in January 2009 that aims to restore good-neighbourly relations between Russia and Georgia.

The society also looks to promote Russian language and culture in Georgia, and Georgian language and culture in Russia, as well as to advance the integration of the Russophone minority in Georgia. The society was named after the Georgian king Irakli II, who placed his kingdom under formal Russian protection in 1783.
