= Khilkov =

Khilkov is a surname of Russian origin.

== Notable members ==
- Andrey Khilkov (1676–1716), Prince, Russian diplomat and ambassador
- Dmitry Khilkov (1858–1914), Prince, military and later a peace activist
- Mikhail Khilkov (1834–1909), Prince, Russian railroad executive
- Stepan Khilkov (1785–1854), Prince, eldest son of Prince Alexander Jacobovich Khilkoff and military commander
