= Princess Ketevan of Kakheti =

Princess of Kakheti, wife of Adil Shah of Iran

Ketevan (Georgian: ქეთევანი; Persian: کتایون, romanized: Katāyūn; fl. 1737) was a Georgian princess royal (batonishvili) of the Bagrationi dynasty. She was a daughter of Teimuraz II and sister of Heraclius II and married the Afsharid Iranian royal Adel Shah (Ali-qoli Khan) in 1737.

== Biography ==
Ketevan was the eldest daughter of Teimuraz II of Kakheti, by his second wife, Princess Tamar of Kartli. Teimuraz, then at war to secure his throne, was summoned by his suzerain Nader Shah, the Afsharid ruler of Iran, in 1737. In a show of loyalty, Teimuraz had to agree to Nader's terms, which included the marriage of Teimuraz's daughter Ketevan to Nader's nephew Ali-qoli Khan and summoning his son Heraclius to join Nader's campaign to India, a deal which Teimuraz would lament in his autobiographical poem. The marriage was celebrated at Mashhad, attended by Teimuraz and his entourage of 2,500. Ketevan's subsequent fate is unknown. Her husband, Ali-qoli Khan, maintained friendly relations with Teimuraz and the Georgians. He relied on Sohrab Khan, a vizier of Georgian background, and exchanged gifts with his father-in-law during his brief reign over the crumbling Afsharid empire as Adel Shah from 1747 to 1748. Adel Shah was overthrown by his brother Ebrahim Khan and killed in 1749.
