= Ketevan Lomtatidze =

Georgian linguist (1911–2007)

Ketevan Lomtatidze (Georgian: ქეთევან ლომთათიძე; February 11, 1911 – September 22, 2007) was a Georgian linguist (Caucasiologist), specialist in Kartvelian and Abkhaz studies.

== Life ==
In 1931, she graduated from the department of philology of the Tbilisi State University, specializing in Abkhaz and Abaza language. Some authors regard her as the greatest researcher of these two languages.

She was the first woman to acquire a Doctor of Science degree in Georgia (1945). From 1953 to 1963 and from 1975 to 1987 she worked as the Director of the Institute of Linguistics of the Academy of Sciences of the Georgian SSR.

In 1984, she was awarded the Dmitry Gulia State Prize of Abkhazia.

Throughout her academic career, she published around 400 works (including 8 books) in Georgian, Abkhaz, Russian, English and German language.

== Publications ==
- Ašxaruli dialekʻti da misi adgili sxva apʻxazur-abazur dialekʻttʻa šoris : tekʻstebitʻurtʻ, 1954
- Apʻxazuri da abazuri enebis istoriul-šedarebitʻi analizi , 1976
- Lokalur preverbtʻa żiritʻadi saxeobani da matʻi gapʻormeba apʻxazursa da abazurši, 1981
- Komplekʻstʻagan momdinare bilabialuri xšulebi kʻartʻvelur enebši, 1984
