= Heraclius II of Georgia =

King of Kakheti (1744–1798) and Kartli (1762–98)

Heraclius II
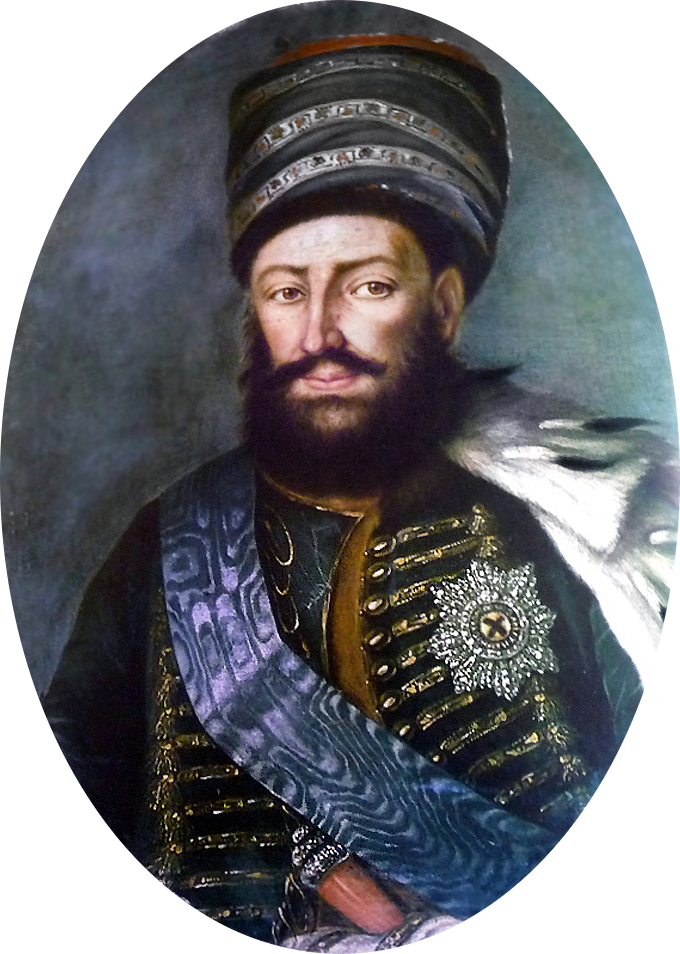
- Portrait by unknown, mid–late 18th century

King of Kartli-Kakheti
- Reign: 8 January 1762 – 11 January 1798
- Predecessor: Teimuraz II (King of Kartli)
- Successor: George XII

King of Kakheti
- Reign: 1744–1762
- Predecessor: Teimuraz II
- Successor: Unification with Kartli
- Born: 7 November 1720; Telavi
- Died: 11 January 1798 (aged 77)
- Burial: Svetitskhoveli Cathedral
- Spouse: Ketevan Pkheidze (m. 1740; died 1744) (Note: Some sources identify Ketevan Orbeliani as Heraclius's first wife; however, more recent scholarship argues that the marriage did not take place.) Anna Abashidze (m. 1745; died 1749) Darejan Dadiani (m. 1750)
- Issue Among others: Prince Vakhtang; George XII; Princess Helen; Princess Mariam; Prince Levan; Prince Iulon; Prince Vakhtang-Almaskhan; Catholicos-Patriarch Anton II; Princess Anastasia; Princess Ketevan; Prince Mirian; Prince Alexander; Princess Tekle; Prince Parnaoz
- Dynasty: Bagrationi
- Father: Teimuraz II
- Mother: Tamar of Kartli
- Religion: Georgian Orthodox Church Royal seal

- Khelrtva

Heraclius II (Note: In the contemporary Persian sources he is referred to as Erekli Khan (ارکلی خان), while Russians knew him as Irakly (Ираклий). Heraclius is the Latinized form of his name.) (Georgian: ერეკლე II, romanized: erek'le II), also known as The Little Kakhetian (Georgian: პატარა კახი, romanized: p'at'ara k'akhi; 7 November 1720 – 11 January 1798), of the Bagrationi dynasty, was the king (mepe) of the Kingdom of Kakheti from 1744 to 1762, and of the Kingdom of Kartli-Kakheti from 1762 until his death in 1798.

From being granted the kingship of Kakheti by his overlord Nader Shah in 1744 as a reward for his loyalty, to becoming the penultimate king of the united kingdoms of Kakheti and Kartli in eastern Georgia, his reign is regarded as the swan song of the Georgian monarchy. Aided by his personal abilities and the unrest in Iran following Nader Shah's death, Heraclius established himself as a de facto autonomous ruler, unified eastern Georgia politically for the first time in three centuries, and attempted to modernize the government, economy, and military. Overwhelmed by the internal and external menaces to Georgia's precarious independence and its temporary hegemony in eastern Transcaucasia, he placed his kingdom under the formal Russian protection in 1783, but the move did not prevent Georgia from being devastated by the Persian invasion in 1795. Heraclius died in 1798, leaving the throne to his moribund heir, George XII.

== Early years ==
Heraclius was born on 7 November 1720 in Telavi, capital of the Kingdom of Kakheti, son of Teimuraz II and his wife, Tamar of Kartli, daughter of Vakhtang VI. His childhood and early teens coincided with the Ottoman occupation of Kakheti from 1732 until 1735, when they were expelled by Nader Shah's Persian troops in two successive campaigns in 1734 and 1735, by which the latter quickly reestablished Persian rule over Georgia.

Teimuraz sided with the Persians and was installed as a Persian vali (governor) in Kakheti, while Kilij Ali-Khan (Khanjal) was made that of neighboring Kartli. However, many Georgian nobles refused to accept the new regime and rose in rebellion in response to heavy tribute levied by Nader upon the Georgian provinces. Nonetheless, Teimuraz and Heraclius remained loyal to the shah, partly in order to prevent the comeback of the rival Mukhrani branch, whose fall early in the 1720s had opened the way to Teimuraz's accession in Kartli.

From 1737 to 1739, Heraclius commanded a Georgian auxiliary force during Nader's expedition in India and gained a reputation of an able military commander. He then served as a lieutenant to his father and assumed the regency when Teimuraz II was briefly summoned for consultations in the Persian capital of Isfahan in 1744. In the meantime, Heraclius defeated a coup attempt by the rival Georgian prince Abdullah Beg of the Mukhrani dynasty and helped Teimuraz suppress the aristocratic opposition to the Persian hegemony led by Givi Amilakhvari (1689–1754). As a reward, Nader granted the kingship of Kartli to Teimuraz and of Kakheti to Heraclius in 1744, and also arranged the marriage of his nephew Ali-Qoli Khan, who eventually would succeed him as Adel Shah, to Teimuraz's daughter Ketevan.

=== Nader's death and reign in Kakheti ===
Yet, both Georgian kingdoms remained under heavy Persian tribute until Nader was assassinated in 1747. Teimuraz and Heraclius took advantage of the ensuing political instability in Persia to assert their independence and expelled Persian garrisons from all key positions in Georgia, including Tbilisi. In close cooperation with each other, they managed to prevent a new revolt by the Mukhranian supporters fomented by Ebrahim Khan, brother of Adel Shah, in 1748. They concluded an anti-Persian alliance with the khans of Azerbaijan who were particularly vulnerable to the aggression from Persian warlords and agreed to recognize Heraclius's supremacy in eastern Transcaucasia. In 1749, he occupied Yerevan, and in June 1751, Heraclius defeated a large army commanded by a pretender to the Persian throne and his former ally, Azat-Khan in the Battle of Kirkhbulakh. After these particular events, Heraclius could largely afford to ignore the changing situation to the south of the Aras River. In 1752, the Georgian kings sent a mission to Russia to request 3,000 Russian troops or a subsidy to enable them to hire Circassian mercenaries in order to invade Persia and install a pro-Russian government there. The embassy failed to yield any results, however, for the Russian court was preoccupied with European affairs.

== King of Kartli and Kakheti ==
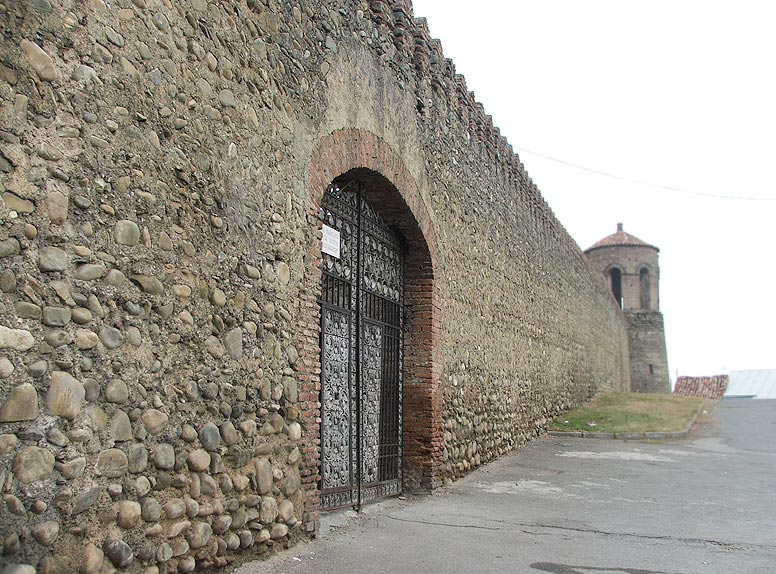
The Palace of King Heraclius II in Telavi

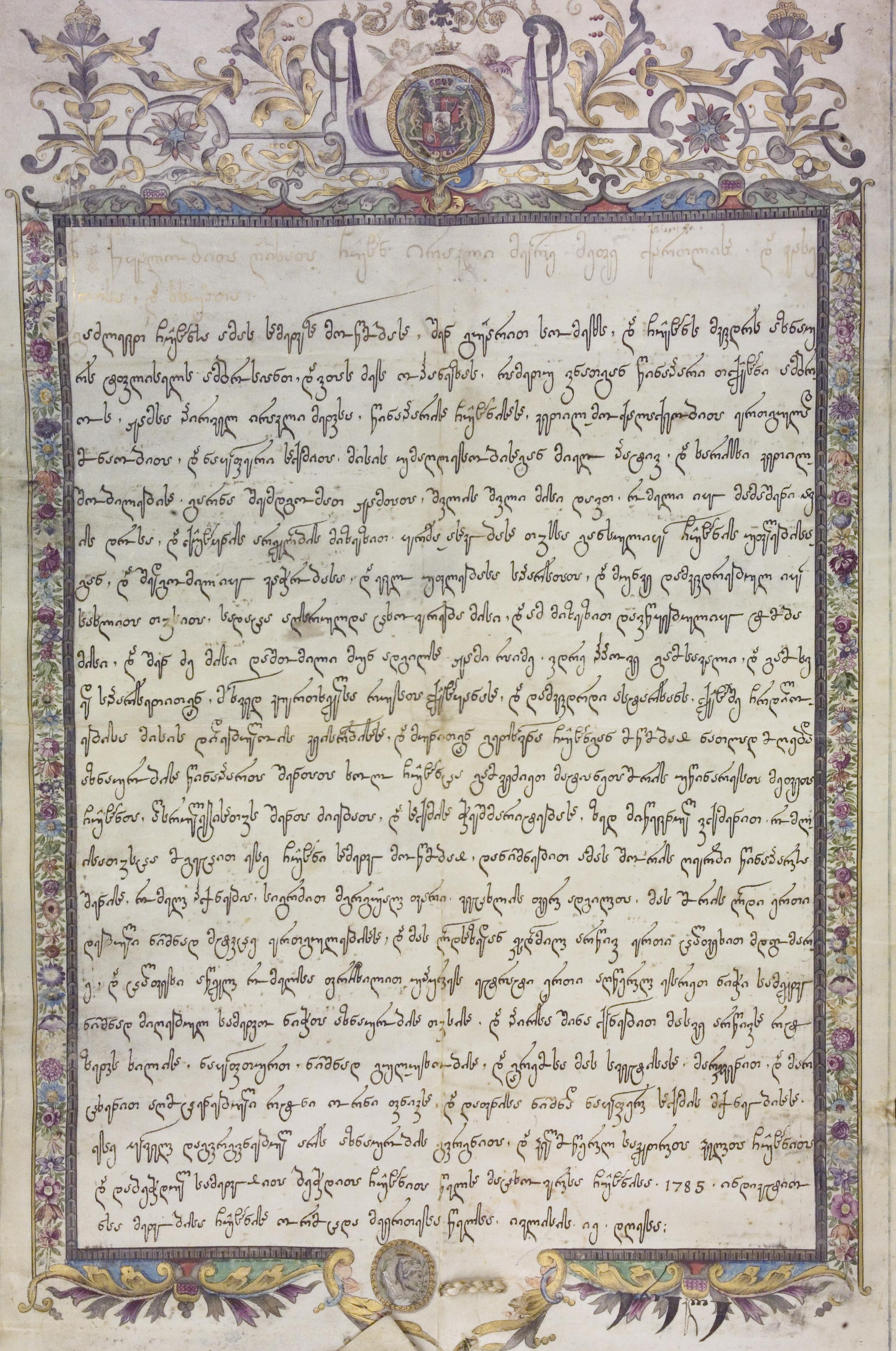
Royal charter of King Hereclius II.

Around the same time, it had become apparent that Mashhad, a minor Afsharid remnant, was no longer functioning as the seat of the Iranian government. In 1762, Teimuraz II died while on a diplomatic mission to the court of St. Petersburg, and Heraclius succeeded him as King of Kartli, thus uniting eastern Georgia politically for the first time in three centuries. In 1762–1763, during Karim Khan Zand's campaigns in Azerbaijan, Heraclius II tendered his de jure submission to him and received his investiture as vali ("governor", "viceroy") of Gorjestan (Georgia), the traditional Safavid office, which by this time however had become an "empty honorific".

=== Alliance with Russia ===
In foreign policy, Heraclius was primarily focused on seeking a reliable protector that would guarantee Georgia's survival. He chose Russia not only because it was Orthodox Christian, but in Lang's account also because it would serve as a link to Europe, which he thought a model for Georgia's development as a modern nation. Yet, Heraclius's initial cooperation with Russia proved disappointing. His participation in the Russo-Turkish War (1768–1774) did not lead to an anticipated reconquest of the Ottoman-held southern Georgian lands, for the Russian commanders in Georgia behaved in a highly condescending, often treacherous way, and Empress Catherine II treated the Caucasus front as merely a secondary theater of military operations. Still, Heraclius continued to seek firmer alliance with Russia, his immediate motivation being the Persian ruler Karim Khan's attempts to bring Georgia back into the Persian sphere of influence. Karim Khan's death in 1779 temporarily relieved Heraclius of these dangers, as Persia again became engulfed in chaos.

In 1783, the Russian expansion southward into the Crimea brought the Caucasus into Catherine II's area of interest. In the Treaty of Georgievsk of 1783, Heraclius finally obtained the guarantees he had sought from Russia, transforming Georgia into a Russian protectorate, as Heraclius formally repudiated all legal ties to Persia and placed his foreign policy under the Russian supervision. However, during the Russo-Turkish War (1787–1792), a Tbilisi-based small Russian force evacuated Georgia, leaving Heraclius to face new dangers from Persia alone. In 1790 Heraclius concluded the Treaty of the Iberians with western Georgian polities.

=== Persian invasion ===
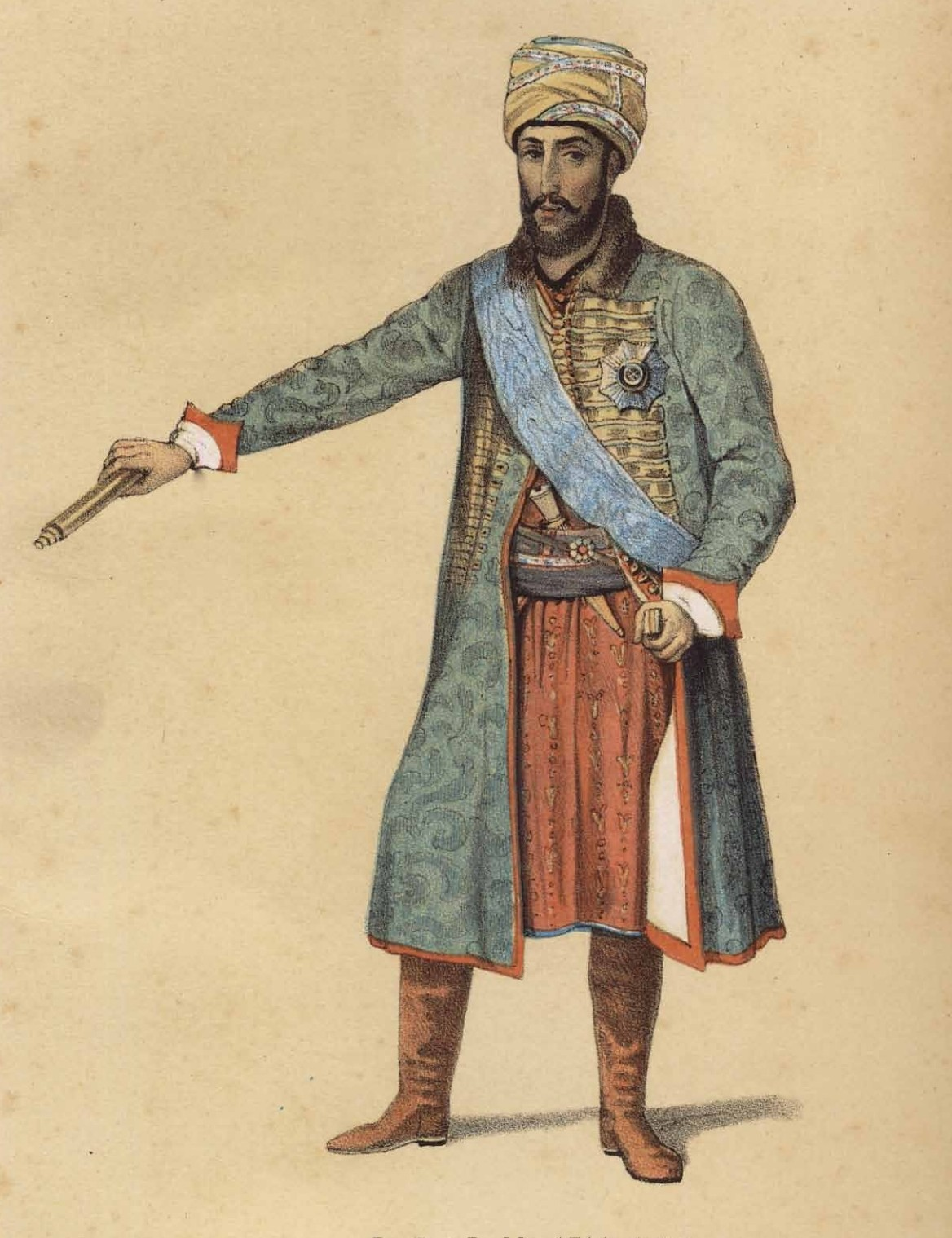
Heraclius II, copy by Grigory Gagarin.

Mohammad Khan Qajar, who had managed to bring most of central Iranian plateau under his firm control by 1794, was inclined to revive the Persian Empire with the Caucasus again as its part. In 1795, after a swift reconquest of much of southeastern Caucasus, he demanded that Heraclius reacknowledged Persian suzerainty, promising in return to confirm him as vali. Heraclius refused, and in September 1795, the Persian army of 35,000 moved into Georgia. After the valiant defense of Tbilisi at the Battle of Krtsanisi, in which the king participated personally in the advance guard, Heraclius's small army of 5000 men was almost completely annihilated and Tbilisi completely sacked. While becoming a witness of the fearful devastation of his capital and slaughter of its civilians, king Heraclius, who did not want to leave the battlefield and the city was spirited away by the last of his bodyguards and a few family members. The Persian invasion delivered a hard blow to Georgia from which it was not able to recover. Despite being abandoned at the critical moment, he still had to rely on belated Russian support and fought, in 1796, alongside the Russian expeditionary forces sent by Catherine into the Persian territories. But her death that year brought an abrupt change of policy in the Caucasus, and her successor Paul I again withdrew all Russian troops from the region. Agha Mohammad launched his second campaign to punish the Georgians for their alliance with Russia. However, his assassination in 1797 spared Kartli-Kakheti more devastation.

In the early spring of 1796, Heraclius sent Alexander and David Batonishvili to Ganja to punish Javad Khan, who was currently being besieged by Ibrahim Khalil Khan of the Karabakh Khanate. Upon hearing of the Georgians' advance, Ibrahim Khalil Khan negotiated a settlement with Javad Khan, forcing the latter to pay an indemnity in the amount of 10,000 rubles and give his son and sister as hostages, before retreating to his fortress in Karabakh. When the Georgians arrived at Ganja, they established a siege of the city before being reinforced by an army led by Heraclius, his son, George, and Ioane Batonishvili. Frightened by the Georgians' revenge, Javad Khan sued for peace and sent them the keys to the city. Although Heraclius accepted the return of 400 Georgian prisoners, he did not accept Javad Khan's "sword tied around his neck" and imposed an annual tax of 15 thousand manats on the khan.

=== Coinage ===
Heraclius II's "curiously ambivalent position" in these decades is reflected in the coins issued by him in his realm. Silver coins were struck with the name of Ismail III on it, or with the Zand-style inscription ya karim ("O Gracious One"), whereby an epithet to God was invoked, which actually referred to Karim Khan Zand. These coins were minted in Tbilisi up until 1799 – some twenty years after Karim Khan Zand's death. In the same decades, the copper coins struck at Tbilisi bore three types of iconography; Christian, Georgian, "and even" Imperial Russian (such as the double-headed eagle). By minting the silver coins with a reference to Karim Khan Zand on it they were usable for trade in Iran, whereas the copper coins, struck for only local use, reflected Heraclius II's political orientation towards Russia.

=== Court, efforts and final years ===
While maintaining certain Persian-type pomp at his court, he launched an ambitious program of "Europeanization" which was supported by the Georgian intellectual élites, but was not overwhelmingly successful because Georgia remained physically isolated from Europe and had to expend all available resources on defending its precarious independence. He strove to enlist the support of European powers and to attract Western scientists and technicians to give his country the benefit of the latest military and industrial techniques. His style of governing resembled that of contemporary enlightened despots in Central Europe. He exercised executive, legislative, and judicial authority and closely supervised the activities of government departments. Heraclius's primary objective in internal policy was to further centralize the government through reducing the powers of the aristocracy. For this purpose, he attempted to create a governing élite composed of his own agents to replace the self-minded aristocratic lords in local affairs. At the same time, he encouraged peasant-vassals to supply the military force necessary to overcome the aristocracy's resistance and protect the country from incessant marauding assaults from Dagestan known to Georgians as Lekianoba. In the words of the British historian David Marshall Lang, "his vigilance in the care of his people knew no bounds. On campaign, he would sit up at night watching for the enemy, while in time of peace, he spent his life in transacting business of state or in religious exercise, and devoted but a few hours to sleep."

Heraclius died in 1798 still convinced that only Russian protection could ensure the continued existence of his country. He was succeeded by his weak and sickly son, George XII, after whose death Tsar Paul I annexed, in 1801, Kartli-Kakheti to Russia, terminating both Georgia's independence and a millennium-long rule of the Bagrationi dynasty.

=== Reforms ===
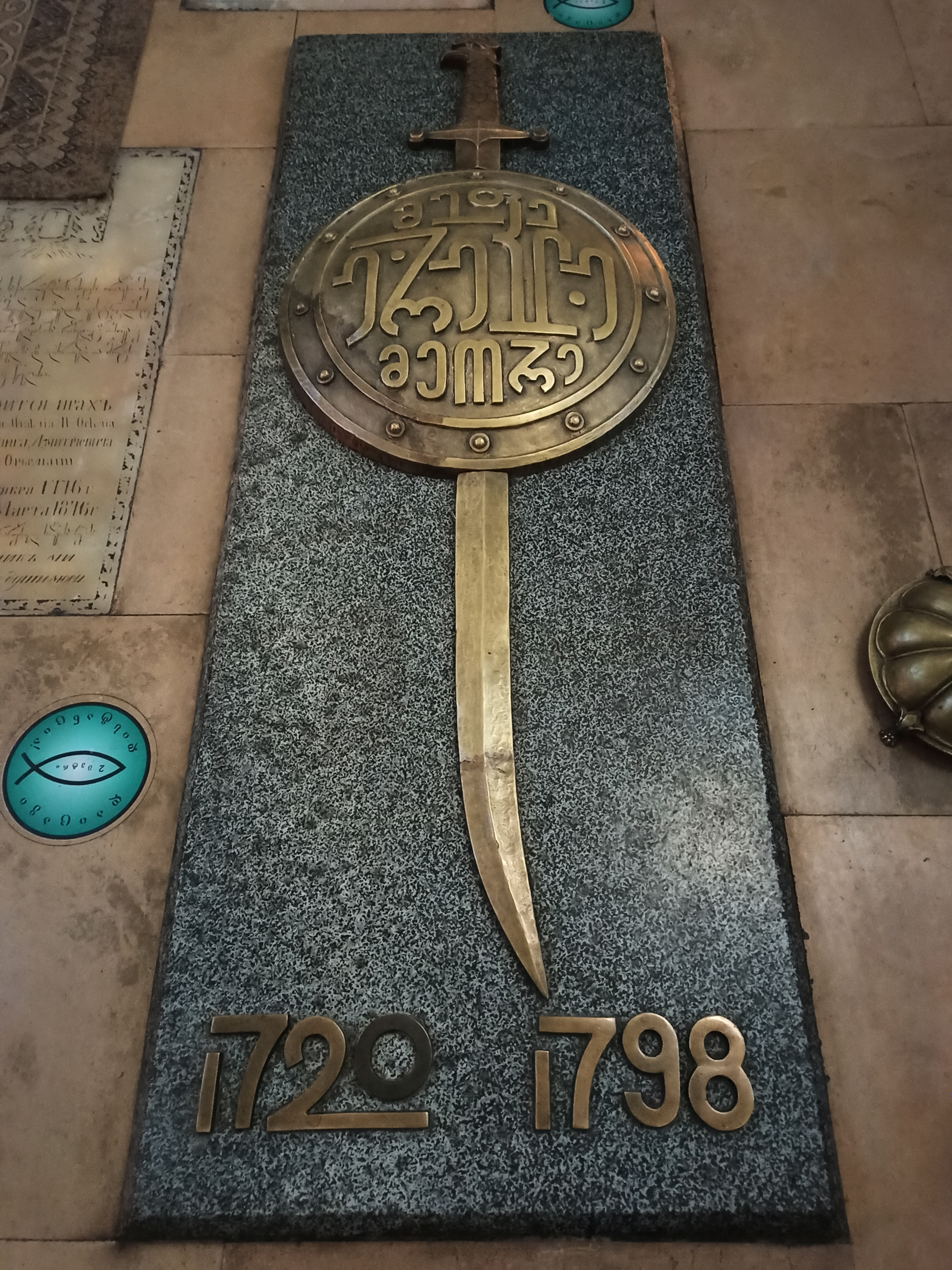
The tomb of Heraclius II in Svetitskhoveli cathedral.

During his reign, Heraclius enacted several reforms. Printing in Tbilisi resumed in 1749 and Heraclius set up his press. He wanted to print canonical liturgical texts and to standardize a language. During his rule, over 40 titles were printed, almost all liturgical, in runs of up to 1000. Heraclius strengthened royal authority and organized it on Russian lines. He launched efforts to repopulate the lands of Kartli-Kakheti, abandoned due to constant wars and other social reasons. For this purpose, he appointed agents, Mkrelebi, who were tasked with returning refugee serfs in Nakhichevan and Karabakh back to their lands, even with violence. He also lured migrants with tax exemptions for them. Heraclius approved violence to stop serfs from complaining, but landowners were blamed for runaways and a severe punishment was employed on them for sexually abusing their serfs. Heraclius had hard time disciplining his nobles. He forbade selling serfs without land twice in 1754 and 1770. He, the Catholicos and the Darbazi announced that prisoners of war and slaves would become free peasants on crown lands. Under Heraclius’s rule, freemen were more common as some Church peasants and veteran soldiers became freemen, but in overall most of the peasants remained still serfs.

Heraclius modernized agriculture by growing new varieties of grain in Tusheti. Grain became cheaper and famines ended. Peasants paid taxes in fruit or walnuts. Factories were producing sugar, glass, cloth and armaments. Half of a tonne of silver was produced each year. For this purpose, Heraclius invited Greek miners from Levant to work in gold and silver deposits in Akhtala. Inheritance laws were passed which introduced protections for properties of merchants against the crown. Customs duty was set at two and a half percent and revenues increased in the 1760s. Under Heraclius, mdivanbegis sasamartlo (chief secretary's courts) was formed, while the king’s Darbazi was functioning as a permanent supreme court and privy council. There were two ministers of foreign affairs: one Christian and one Muslim. Heraclius also created a police force. Ancient universities of Tiflis and Telavi were restored, where Bachmeister was taught.

Heraclius's policies and exploitation of peasants by landowners often resulted in rebellions: when lord Eliozashvili demanded more than the usual 50 days' work on his estates, serfs revolted and attacked his family, burned his church and stole casks of wine. In 1773, Pshav tribesmen destroyed castle of their lord and held him hostage, while in 1777, Ksani peasants revolted against the initiative of Heraclius to reestablish Duchy of Ksani, abolished by his father. In 1780, Heraclius introduced bonds which compelled the wealthy to lend three tumans to the state, which also faced opposition.

In 1770s, Heraclius reformed his army with Russian advisers, training manuals and ranks. He created a regiment of guards based on the European model. An army was permanently paid, although it was still allowed to loot. Tbilisi had a gunpowder factory, although in a state of ramshackle. In 1774, Heraclius introduced mandatory conscription – one man from household served one month per year on his own expenses. Civic development lagged behind and plague resulted in 4,000 deaths in 1770.

Due to the Lezgin raids on population and unwillingness of the peasants to submit to the conscription, Heraclius heavily relied on recruiting foreign mercenaries, particularly among Cherkess clan, which was more civil than Lezgins and had a close sympathy towards Georgians.

== Family ==
In 1740, Heraclius first married Ketevan (died 1744), daughter of Prince Zaal Pkheidze. They had two children:

- Princess Rusudan, who died young;
- Prince Vakhtang the Good (1742–1760).

In 1745, Heraclius married secondly Anna (1730–1749), daughter of Prince Zaal Abashidze. They had three children:

- George XII (1746–1800), King of Kartli-Kakheti (r. 1798–1800);
- Princess Tamar (1749–1786), who married David, son of Revaz Orbeliani;
- An unnamed daughter, who died young.

In 1750, Heraclius married thirdly Darejan (1734–1807), daughter of Prince Katsia Dadiani. They had twenty-three children:

- Princess Helen (1753–1786), who married firstly Prince Archil of Imereti and secondly Prince Zakaria Andronikashvili; she was the mother of Solomon II of Imereti;
- Princess Mariam (1755–1828), who married David (1749–1792), son of Prince Alexander Tsitsishvili;
- Prince Levan (1756–1781);
- Princess Sophio, who died young;
- Prince Ioane, who died young;
- Prince Iulon (1760–1816);
- Princess Salome, who died young;
- Prince Vakhtang-Almaskhan (1761–1814);
- Prince Beri (born 1761/2), who died young;
- Anton II of Georgia (Prince Teimuraz) (1762–1827), Catholicos-Patriarch of Georgia (1788–1811);
- Princess Anastasia (1763–1838), who married Revaz (died 1814), son of George Eristavi (Ksani);
- Princess Ketevan (1764–1840), who married Ioane, Prince of Mukhrani;
- Prince Soslan-David, who died young;
- Prince Solomon (died 1765);
- Prince Mirian (1767–1834);
- Princess Khoreshan, who died young;
- Prince Alexander (1770–1844);
- Prince Luarsab (born 1772), who died young;
- Princess Ekaterine (1774–1818), who married George (1773–1806), son of Prince Givi Cholokashvili;
- Princess Tekle (1776–1846), who married Vakhtang (1769–1812), son of Dimitri Orbeliani;
- Prince Parnaoz (1777–1852);
- Prince Archil (born 1780), who died young;
- An unnamed child (born 1782), who died young.

== Legacy ==
King Heraclius occupies a special place among the Georgian monarchs, with his name being associated with chivalry and valour among Georgians. However, Heraclius's decision to sign Treaty of Georgievsk with Russia has been a matter of dispute among Georgians since the 19th century. It has been reported that those with different views on how to manage relations with Russia accordingly have different interpretations of Heraclius's move. For example, the "Society of Erekle II", established in 2009, seeks closer ties with Russia as opposed to the integration with the West. They primarily justify their position by alluding to Heraclius's decision and claim that the Orthodox kinship with Russia was of paramount importance to preserve Georgian nationhood, while European culture may pose a threat to Georgian spirituality, especially Orthodox Christianity as a pillar of Georgianness. Others who hold more pro-Western views emphasize that King Heraclius saw Russia as a window to European civilization.

Erekleoba is an annual, traditional public feast celebrated at Hereclius II's palace in Eastern Georgia's city of Telavi on November 7 to pay tribute to his memory.

== See also ==
- List of people with the most children
- Society of Erekle II

== Sources ==
- Sychyov, N. V. (2005). Книга династий [Book of dynasties]. Moscow: AST. ISBN 978-5170500819.
- Hitchins, Keith (1998). "Erekle II". In Yarshater, Ehsan (ed.). Encyclopædia Iranica (Online ed.). Encyclopædia Iranica Foundation.
- Fisher, William Bayne; Avery, P.; Hambly, G. R. G; Melville, C. (1991). The Cambridge History of Iran. Vol. 7. Cambridge University Press. ISBN 0521200954.
- Perry, John R. (2006). Karim Khan Zand. Oneworld Publications. ISBN 978-1851684359.
- Suny, Ronald Grigor (1994). The Making of the Georgian Nation. Indiana University Press. ISBN 978-0253209153.
- Allen, William (2023). A History of the Georgian People: From the Beginning Down to the Russian Conquest in the Nineteenth Century. Taylor & Francis. ISBN 9781000855302.
- Rayfield, Donald (2012). Edge of Empires: A History of Georgia. London: Reaktion Books. ISBN 978-1-78023-070-2.

Regnal titles
| Preceded by Teimuraz II | King of Kakheti; 1744–1762 | Succeeded by Became King of Kartli and Kakheti |
| Preceded by New style | King of Kartli and Kakheti; 1762–1798 | Succeeded by George XII |
