= Mouravi =

Mouravi Mose Memarnishvili with his wife

Mouravi (Georgian: მოურავი pronounced [mouɾavi]) was an administrative and military officer in early modern Georgia, translated into English as seneschal, bailiff, or constable. A mouravi was an appointed royal official who had a jurisdiction over particular town or district. In towns, the mouravi was assisted by a police officer, natsvali. The best-known mouravi in Georgian history was Giorgi Saakadze, called "the Grand Mouravi."
