= Mkheidze =

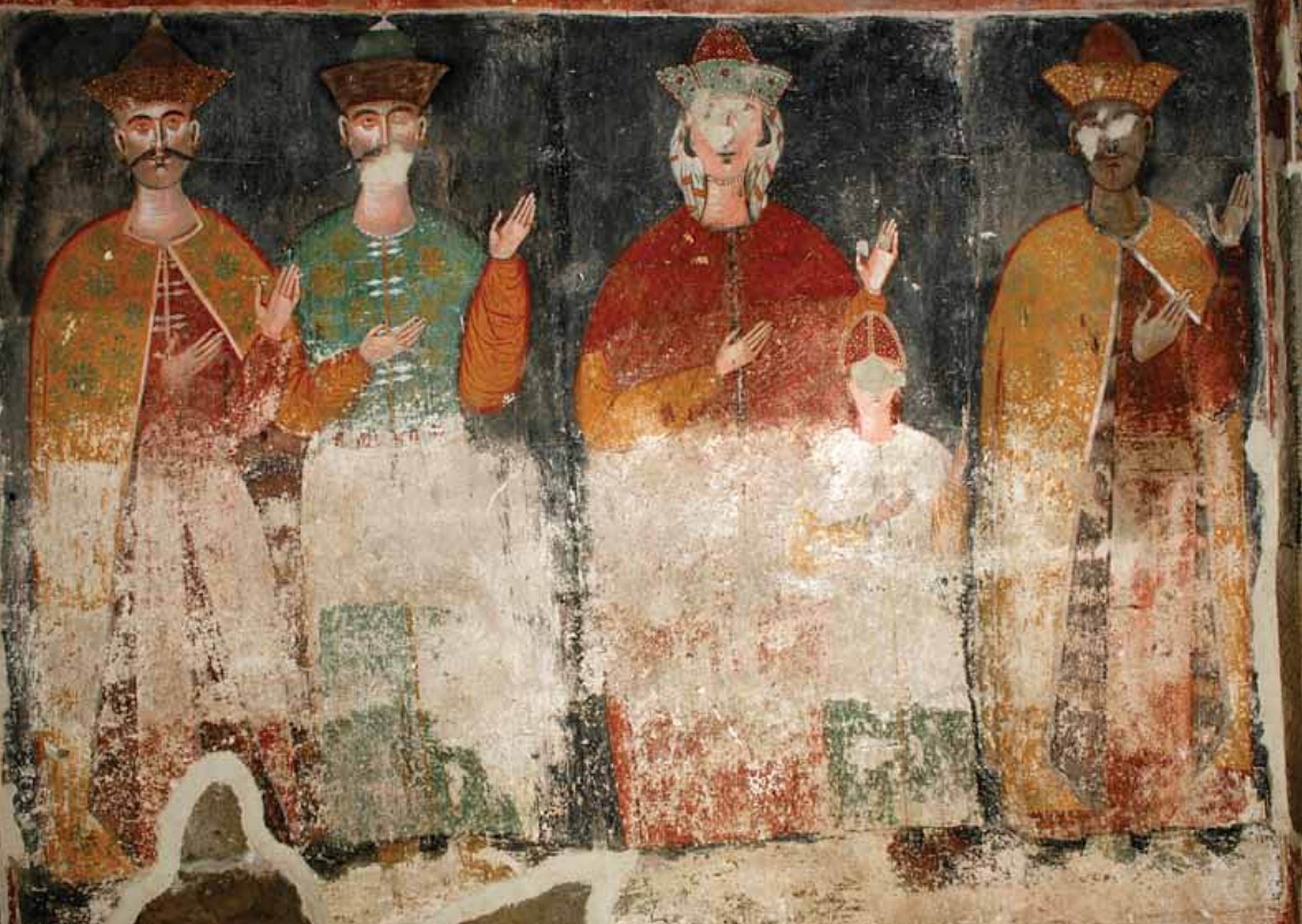
Ktetors of The Tsalenjikha Cathedral Church of the Transfiguration of Savior, members of the Mkheidze dynasty

The House of Mkheidze (Georgian: მხეიძე), originally Mkhetsidze (მხეციძე), also Pkheidze (ფხეიძე), Kheidze (ხეიძე), Mkhetsia (მხეცია), and Khetsia (ხეცია), is an ancient Georgian noble family, known from the eighth century. This house, centered at the western district of Argveti, has survived to the end of the Georgian kingdoms and the Russian Empire which granted them recognition of their princely title (Georgian: tavadi, Russian: knyaz) in 1850.

== History ==
According to the Georgian author Ioane Bagrationi, writing early in the 19th century, the Mkheidze traced their descent to the medieval house of Liparitid-Orbeli though the version cannot be substantiated by servicing historical evidence. A legend has it that the 8th-century nobles David and Constantine killed by the Arabs belonged to the Mkheidze family.

Genealogy of Princes Mkhetsidze (1892)

The Mkhe(ts)idze are first documented in the 11th-century cross inscription. In the early 16th century, the Mkheidze fief – Samkheidzo – emerged centered on the village of Zedubani near the present-day town of Tqibuli, but went in decline later that century. In the 17th century, the family partially restored its old prestige. Several of its members occupied high posts at the court of the Imeretian kings. They intermarried with the Dadiani of Mingrelia, the Gurieli of Guria, and the Bagrationi of Kakheti and of Imereti.

With the death of Prince Giorgi Mkheidze (1795–1856), the princely branch of the Imeretian Chkheidze/Mkheidze became extinct in their male line. The surviving Chkheidze/Mkheidze descend from the gentry (aznauri) line as well as the princely (tavadi) one established in Mingrelia in the first half of the 18th century.
