= House of Gelovani =

Georgian princely family

Gelovani გელოვანი
- Nobility
- Parent house: House of Vardanisdze
- Country: Georgia
- Titles: Principality of Svaneti
- Cadet branches: Dadeshkeliani

The House of Gelovani (Georgian: გელოვანი) is a Georgian princely family from the lower part of the mountainous province of Svaneti – formerly rulers of Svaneti.

== Origin ==
The family can be traced back to the 11th century: one of the princes (mtavari) Gelovani is mentioned as a minister in the Government of Queen Tamar. The origin of the surname is very ancient. The local Svanetian tradition holds it that the Gelovani arrived in the early Mediaeval Age from the Arabian peninsula, where they had been the keepers of the sacred Black Stone of Kaaba before the era of Islam. The etymological provenance of the surname appears to confirm this as G(a)L(a)VAN means "stone" or "stone hedge" in the old Svanetian language (note that "-ani" means "of", i.e. implying "the son of"). Similarly, the local Svanetian epic poem "The song about Giga Glvan" mentions one of the Gelovani ancestors. There is another theory - now discredited - that the princes Gelovani branched off the Kvenipneveli dynasty, which also produced the line of the Eristavi of Ksani and that of the Princes Ratishvili. Under King Bagrat V, the House of Gelovani succeeded the House of Vardanisdze in 1360 as the dukes (eristavi) of Svaneti. Their dynastic name was variously spelled as Geloani, Gelovani, Geluvani, Geliani, Geliani Daturar and Geliani Tualai. The chronology and genealogy of the House of Gelovani house is not established with sufficient detail for much of the period. The detailed genealogy is, however, available from the mid-18th century and has been recently published in the Russian Imperial Nobility Encyclopaedia (Vol IV). The House of Gelovani gave rise to the House of Dadeshkeliani in the 17th century: one of the princes Gelovani had a first name Dadesh (Dadash), which was merged into the family name to create a new line of the Dadeshkeliani. With the emerging power of the Dadeshkeliani clan in the 18th century, who became rulers of the Upper Svaneti, the rule of Gelovani was limited to the eastern area of Svaneti (Lower Svaneti).

== History ==
Following the annexation of Georgia by Russia in the late 18th century, the House of Gelovani was recognised in the Princely status—or knyaz in Russian—by the Highly Instituted Commission of the Russian Empire under the Ruling Senate Governance. Prince Varlam Gelovani was a deputy of the Russian State Fourth Duma in 1912-1914 and a close friend of Alexander Kerensky. The House of Gelovani historically intermarried with the other princely families of Georgia, such as Chikovani, Dadiani, Yashvili, Tarkhan-Mouravi etc. The descendants of the House of Gelovani live in Georgia, Russia, Germany, United States and the United Kingdom. In the United States, the family name is spelt as Gelovani, in the United Kingdom as Guelovani, and in Germany - as Gelowani. The dynasty has produced a number of leading Russian and Georgian, as well as world-famous, scientists and artists, including an actor Mikheil Gelovani, an engineer Archil Gelovani, a Soviet Chief Marshal of the Corps of Engineers, and an opera director of the Bolshoy Theatre Georgy Gelovani.
