= Cholokashvili =

The Cholokashvili family coat of arms

The House of Cholokashvili (Georgian: ჩოლოყაშვილი, Russian: Чолокаевы) was an old Georgian noble family. It claimed an exotic foreign lineage and first appeared in the eastern Georgian province, and later kingdom, of Kakheti in 1320. They were enfeoffed of the office of Prince-Master of the Palace of Kakheti and produced several notable members from the 16th century into the 20th.

== History ==
Traditional genealogical accounts have it that the family's ancestor was a Genoese officer who moved, in the 14th century, from a Crimean colony to Dagestan where he was dubbed by locals as Cholagh "for the multitude of sheep and cattle he possessed". Cholagh is said to have quarreled with the local tribesmen and fled into neighboring Georgia through the Derbend road in 1320. King George V of Georgia welcomed Cholagh and granted him an apanage and the princely title of the extinct family of Irubakidze in Kakheti.

The family played an important role in later-day Georgia and intermarried with the Kakhetian branch of the Bagrationi dynasty. They were considered one of the 2 "undivided" houses of Kakheti. Their fiefdom — Sacholokao (საჩოლოყაო) — was annexed to Imperial Russia along with east Georgia in 1801, and the family became mediatized as Russian nobility (Russian: Чолокаевы, Cholokaev; or Челокаевы, Chelokaev). The family briefly held the Duchy of Aragvi from 1747 to c. 1753.

== Notable members ==
- Garsevan Cholokashvili, a powerful minister at the court of Levan of Kakheti (reigned 1520–74)
- Shermazan Cholokashvili (died after 1612), politician and diplomat
- Kaikhosro Cholokashvili (died 1613), poet and politician
- Revaz Cholokashvili (died 1648), politician and soldier
- Nikoloz Cholokashvili (Niciphores Irbachi; c. 1585–1658), Georgian Orthodox priest, politician and diplomat.
- Bidzina Cholokashvili (died c. 1660), Christian martyr of Persian aggression canonized by the Georgian Orthodox Church
- Jimsher Cholokashvili (died 1756), eristavi of the Aragvi 1743-56
- Davit Cholokashvili (1735–1810), poet and translator
- Ilia Cholokashvili (1824–1877), major general in the Russian army
- Kakutsa Cholokashvili (1888–1930), military commander and national hero of Georgia

== See also ==
- List of Georgian princely families
