= Tamar of Kartli =

Queen of Kartli from 1744 to 1746

Queen consort of Kakheti
- Tenure: 1732–1744

Queen of Kartli (Note: According to Cyril Toumanoff, Tamar of Kartli became a Georgian monarch in 1744 with the regnal name Tamar II.)
- Reign: 1744–1746
- Co-ruler: Teimuraz II
- Born: 1696
- Died: 12 April 1746 (aged 49–50)
- Burial: Svetitskhoveli Cathedral, Mtskheta
- Spouse: Teimuraz II (m. 1712)
- Issue among others...: Heraclius II of Georgia
- Dynasty: Bagrationi
- Father: Vakhtang VI
- Mother: Rusudan of Circassia
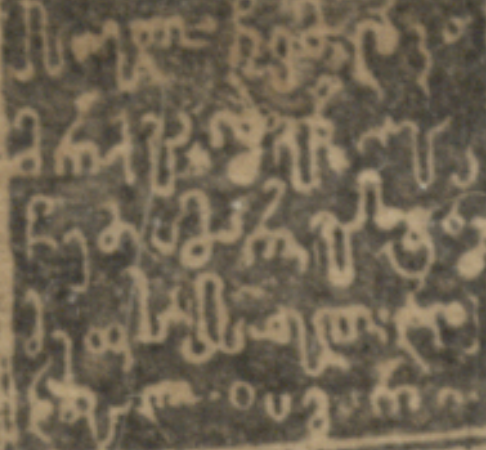
- Khelrtva

Tamar (Georgian: თამარ; 1696 – 12 April 1746) was a queen regnant of Kartli from 1744 to 1746. She was a member of the royal Bagrationi dynasty, a daughter of King Vakhtang VI, of the Mukhranian branch, the second wife of King Teimuraz II, of the Kakhetian branch, and a mother of King Heraclius II of Georgia. The union with Teimuraz made her queen consort of Kakheti.

== Biography ==
Tamar was born to then-Prince Royal Vakhtang of Kartli and his Circassian wife Rusudan in 1696. Vakhtang ruled Kartli intermittently from 1703 until being forced by the Ottoman invasion into exile to the Russian Empire in 1724. At the age of 16, on 2 February 1712, Tamar married, as his second wife, Prince Royal Teimuraz of Kakheti, a younger brother of King David II of Kakheti (Imam Quli Khan). The wedding was lavishly celebrated in Vakhtang's capital city of Tbilisi and then in Manavi, Kakheti. The couple's subsequent life was marred by a civil strife, attacks by the Lezgins, and invasions from the Ottoman Empire and Persia. Teimuraz acceded to the throne of Kakheti, until 1744, when he resigned Kakheti to his son, Heraclius II, and established himself on the vacated throne of his in-laws in Kartli. According to the charter of 1733, her title was "Queen of Queens."

During these years of turmoil, Tamar herself became involved in war and politics. During Teimuraz's absence at the headquarters of his Iranian suzerain, Nader Shah, in Kandahar from 1736 to 1738 Tamar counterbalanced the regency of Teimuraz's Muslim nephew, Ali Mirza (Alexander). She used her influence and the services of Prince Givi Cholokashvili to disrupt Ali Mirza's design for a revolt against Iran, thereby saving her husband and son from Nader's imminent revenge and eventually forcing Ali Mirza out of Kakheti in 1738. When Nader again summoned Teimuraz to his camp at Derbent in 1741, Tamar accompanied her husband, at the shah's request, as a proof of loyalty. Teimuraz succeeded in securing the shah's support for his dynastic ambitions in both Kartli and Kakheti, but this also invited a rebellion led by Prince Givi Amilakhvari. After three years of inconclusive fighting, the rebels were eventually defeated by Teimuraz, and Tamar in person accepted the courteous surrender of Amilakhvari in Surami in 1745. From 1744 until her death in 1746, Tamar was a co-regnant with her husband in Kartli, while their son, Heraclius, began his lengthy reign in Kakheti. Tamar was buried at the Svetitskhoveli Cathedral in Mtskheta. After her death, Teimuraz married his third wife, Ana-Khanum Baratashvili.

== Children ==
Teimuraz and Tamar were the parents of:

- Heraclius II of Georgia (7 November 1720 – 11 January 1798), King of Kakheti (r. 1744–1762) and of Kartli-Kakheti (r. 1762–1798);
- Prince David (fl. 1722–1729);
- Princess Ana (died 4 December 1788), who married first, in 1744, Prince Dimitri Orbeliani (died 1776), and secondly Prince Ioane Orbeliani (fl. 1724–1781);
- Princess Helen, who married Prince Zaza Tsitsishvili in 1743;
- Prince Ioane (fl. 1736–1738);
- Princess Khorasan;
- Princess Ketevan, who married Adel Shah, Shah of Iran (r. 1747–1748), in 1737.

== Ancestry ==
Ancestors of Tamar of Kartli

16. Teimuraz I, Prince of Mukhrani
8. Vakhtang V
17. Ana Sidamoni
4. Prince Levan of Kartli
18. Qaplan Baratashvili-Orbelishvili
9. Rodam Orbeliani
19. Tamar Amilakhvari
2. Vakhtang VI
20. Vakhtang I Gurieli
10. Kaikhosro I Gurieli
21. Tamar Jaqeli
5. Tuta Gurieli
11. Khvaramze Goshadze
1. Tamar
6. Kelchiko of Kabarda
3. Rusudan of Circassia
