= Georgian monarchs family tree of Bagrationi dynasty of Kakheti =

Georgian monarchs family tree of Bagrationi dynasty of Kakheti

BAGRATIONI of united Georgia
Constantine I King of Georgia r.1405/1407–1412
Alexander I 1386–1445/1446; King of Georgia r. 1412–1442	George; Co-king of Georgia r.1408–1412
Demetrius c. 1413–1453; Co-King of Georgia r.1433–1446	George VIII; 1417–1476; King of Georgia r. 1446–1465; King of Kakheti r. 1465–1476	Bagrat VI c. 1439–1478; King of Imereti r.1463–1478 King of Georgia r.1465–1478
BAGRATIONI of Kartli	BAGRATIONI of Imereti
Alexander I 1445/c. 1456–1511; King of Kakheti r. 1476–1511
Demetre (princely Bagrationi-Davitishvili house)	George II; 1464–1513; King of Kakheti r. 1511–1513
Khvaramze d. 1528	Mariam d. 1555	Tinatin d. 1591	Levan; 1503–1574; King of Kakheti r.1518/1520–1574	Shamkhal of Tarku
Jesse of Kakheti c. 1527–1580	Alexander II; 1527–1605; King of Kakheti r.1574–1601 r.1602–1605	George c. 1529–1561	Nicholas V Patriarch of Georgia; 1503–1574 r.1584–1591	El-Mirza; 1532–1580	Nestan; Darejan fl. 1556–1612	Simon I King of Kartli r. 1556–1569 r. 1578–1599
Heraclius; 1568–1589	David I 1569–1602; King of Kakheti r.1601–1602	Ketevan the Martyr c. 1560–1624	George c. 1570–1605	Constantine I 1567–1605; King of Kakheti r.1605	Anna	Bagrat VII; King of Kartli r. 1616–1619
Anna	Teimuraz I 1589–1663; King of Kakheti r. 1605–1616 r. 1625–1633; 1634–1648; King of Kartli r. 1625–1633	Khorashan of Kartli d. 1659	Vakhtang (Bagrat) d. 1604	Helene	Abbas I of Persia the Great r.1588–1629	Fakhr Jahan; Begum
Levan; 1608–1620	Alexander; 1609–1620	Tinatin; 1610–1642	David c. 1612–1648; Ruler of Mukhrani r.1626–1628	Darejan c. 1615–1668
Prince Luarsab d. 1659	Prince George d. 1650/1651	Heraclius I 1642–1709; King of Kakheti r.1675–1676 r.1703–1709	Prince Joseph	Anastasia	Ketevan of Kakheti; 1648–1719
David II; 1678–1722; King of Kakheti r.1709–1722	Teimuraz II; 1695–1762; King of Kakheti r.1732–1744 King of Kartli r.1744–1762	Constantine II d. 1732; King of Kakheti; 1722–1732
Levan (Mahmad Mirza) d. 1734	Alexander III d. 1737/1739	Asan Mirza d. 1750	Heraclius II; 1720/1721–1798; King of Kakheti r.1744–1762 King of Kartli and Kakheti r. 1762–1798	Ketevan fl. 1737	Elene fl. 1743–1784	Ana; 1720–1788	Solomon; 1747–1749	Elisabed; 1750–1770
Elene; 1753–1786	Mariam; 1755–1828	Levan; 1756–1781	Iulon; 1760–1816	Vakhtang; 1761–1814	Anton II the Great Martyr; 1762/1763–1827; Patriarch of Georgia r. 1788–1811	Vakhtang; Duke of Aragvi; 1738/1742–1756/1760
Anastasia; 1763–1838	Ketevan; 1764–1840	Mirian; 1767–1834	George XII; 1746–1800; King of Kartli and Kakheti / Georgia r.1798–1800	Aleksandre; 1770–1844	Tekle; 1776–1846	Parnaoz; 1777–1852
David; 1767–1819; Regent of Georgia; 1800–1801	Ioane; 1768–1830; Head of the Royal House of Georgia r.1819–1830	Bagrat of Georgia; 1776–1841	Teimuraz; 1782–1846	Mikheil; 1783–1862	Jibrael; 1788–1812	Ilia; 1790–1854	Nino; 1772–1847	Okropir; 1795–1857
Spiridon b. 1800	Petre; 1811–1812	Alexander; Bagratovich Gruzinsky; 1820–1865	Giorgi; 1812–c. 1816	Nikoloz; 1816–1833	Konstantine b. 1817	David; 1819–1888
Bagrat b. 1853	Ilia; 1854–1885	Pyotr; Aleksandrovich Gruzinsky; 1857–1922	Giorgi; 1858–1922	Mikheil; 1860–1935	Ivane b. 1863	Levan; 1863–1864
Konstantin; 1915–1939	Petre Gruzinsky; 1920–1984
Dali b. 1939	Mzia b. 1945	Nugzar; Bagration-Gruzinsky; 1950–2025
House of MUKHRANI
Maia b. 1978	Grigoriy Malania	Ana; Bagration-Gruzinsky b. 1976	David Bagration of Mukhrani b. 1976
Mariam; Bagration-Gruzinsky b. 2006	Irina; Bagration-Gruzinsky b. 2002	Giorgi Bagrationi b. 2011

== Bibliography ==
- Rayfield, D. (2013) Edge of Empires: A History of Georgia, Reaktion Books, ISBN 9781780230702
- W.E.D. Allen (1970) Russian Embassies to the Georgian Kings, 1589–1605, Hakluyt Society, ISBN 978-1-4094-4599-9 (hbk)
