= Prince Ilia of Georgia =

Georgian prince

Ilia
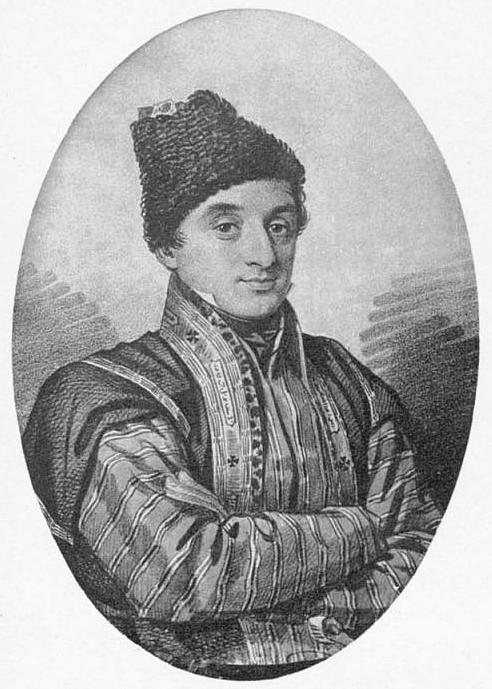
- Born: 2 September 1790; Tbilisi
- Died: 18 July 1854 (aged 63); Moscow
- Spouse: Anastasia Obolonskaya
- Issue Among others: Grigoriy Gruzinsky
- Dynasty: Bagrationi
- Father: George XII
- Mother: Mariam Tsitsishvili
- Religion: Georgian Orthodox Church

Ilia (Georgian: ილია; Russian: Илья Георгиевич, Iliya Georgiyevich), also known as Elizbar (ელიზბარი), (2 September 1790 – 18 July 1854) was a Georgian prince royal (batonishvili), a son of George XII, the last king of the Kingdom of Kartli-Kakheti, by his second marriage to Mariam Tsitsishvili. After the Russian annexation of Georgia in 1801, Ilia accompanied his mother into exile to Russia. He then received military training and served in the Russian army, fighting with distinction at the battle of Borodino against the French in 1812 and retiring with the rank of colonel in 1823. He had 13 children of his marriage with Princess Anastasia Obolonskaya and his descendants, bearing the surname of Gruzinsky, have survived in the 21st-century Russian Federation.

== Biography ==
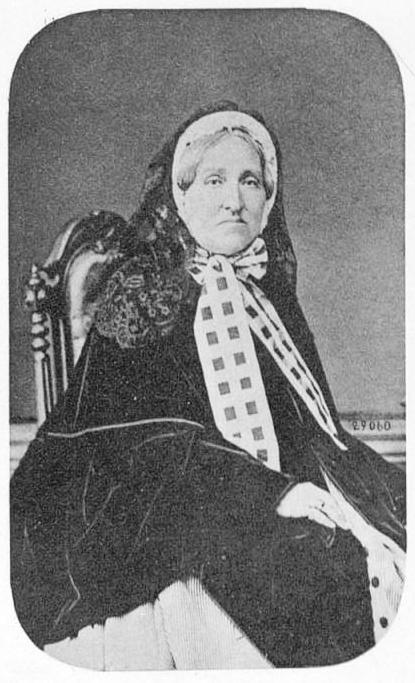
Anastasia Obolonskaya, wife of Prince Ilia

Prince Ilia was born in Tbilisi in 1790 as the fifth child of the then-crown prince George and his second wife Princess Mariam Tsitsishvili in the lifetime of his grandfather, King Heraclius II. Ilia was 10 years old when his father died in December 1800 after two years of a troubled reign. In the ensuing succession crisis, Ilia's elder half brother and regent for the vacant throne, David, vied with Heraclius II's son, Iulon. The situation was exploited in 1801 by the Russian Empire to make annexation of Kartli-Kakheti, the eastern Georgian kingdom, followed by the deportation of the Georgian royal family to Russia proper. In 1803 Ilia himself witnessed the killing of the Russian general Ivan Lazarev by his mother, Queen Dowager Mariam, when Lazarev tried to force her out of her bedroom for resettlement in Russia. Mariam and her children were eventually deported to Russia, where Mariam was confined to a monastery. Ilia was accepted in the Page Corps for military training.

Prince Ilia, known in Russia as the tsarevich Ilya Georgyevich, was commissioned in March 1812 as a podporuchik of the Jäger Guards Regiment, with which he served in the war with Napoleon's Grande Armée. Under the command of Major-General Karl von Bistram, he fought at Smolensk and was marked for distinction at Borodino. In September 1812 illness forced him to retire from active service to Moscow. During the 1813–14 campaign he served in the Reserve Army of General Dmitry Lobanov-Rostovsky in the vicinity of the besieged French fortress of Modlin in Poland. In 1823 Prince Ilia was transferred to the Izmailov Guards Regiment with the promotion to colonel. He retired with that rank the same year.

Prince Ilia mostly lived in Moscow. In 1832, the Russian government revealed that Georgian nobles and intellectuals plotted a coup against the Russian overlordship. Among the principal leaders of the conspiracy was Ilia's brother Prince Okropir, living in St. Petersburg. Although one of the members, Philadelphos Kiknadze, testified on interrogation that Prince Ilia was also present when Okropir discussed the Georgian affairs with him, Ilia was never brought to a trial or otherwise persecuted. While living in Russia, like many of his siblings and relatives, Ilia showed interest in literature. In 1844, he translated from French into Georgian the Leibniz–Clarke correspondence as "ბაასი ორთა უჩინებულესთა ფილოსოფთა ევროპიისათა კლარკ და ლეიბნიცისა" ("The conversation between the two preeminent philosophers of Europe, Clarke and Leibniz"). He died in Moscow at the age of 64 in 1854 and was interred at the Intercession Monastery.

== Family and descendants ==
Prince Ilia married at Moscow in 1827 Princess Anastasia Grigoryevna Obolonskaya (Анастасия Григорьевна Оболонская; 25 September 1805 – 3 March 1885), a daughter of a wealthy nobleman Оболонские. She is buried with her husband at the Intercession Monastery. The couple had 13 children, titled as princes and princesses (knyaz) Gruzinsky, with the addition of the style "Serene Highness" since 1865.

Prince Ilia's surviving male-line descendants are through his son, Prince Grigoriy Gruzinsky, whose great-grandchildren reside in Russia. The only living male member of the line is the Moscow-born Evgeny Petrovich Gruzinsky (born 1947), a son of the Soviet naval officer Pyotr Petrovich Gruzinsky (1916–2006) by his wife Raisa Sergeyevna Yasinkov-Maletskaya (1923–1987). Based on the principle of primogeniture practiced by the Georgian royal family, he can be considered heir presumptive to Prince Nugzar Bagration-Gruzinsky, a scion of Ilia's elder brother Bagrat, who claims headship of the Royal House of Georgia and has no son.

The children of Prince Ilia and Princess Anastasia were:

Portrait	Name	Dates of birth and death	Biographical notes	Family
	Princess Ana Gruzinskaya	1828 – 5 October 1905	She spent eight months as a hostage of the Dagestani Imam Shamil (July 1854–March 1855).	She was married to General Prince David Chavchavadze (1817–1884), with one son, Archil (1869–1913).
	Princess Varvara Gruzinskaya	1831 – 18 March 1884	Maid of honor to the Empress of Russia, she was with her sister Ana in the captivity of Shamil.	She married firstly, in 1852, General Prince Ilia Orbeliani (1818–1853), with two sons, Giorgi (1853–1924) and Dimitri (b. 1853, died in infancy); she married secondly, in 1854, to the certain Nestel, with no known issue.
	Princess Gayana Gruzinskaya	1832 – 5 June 1903	Maid of honor to the Empress of Russia. She is buried at the Intercession Monastery in Moscow.	Unmarried, without children.
	Prince Grigoriy Gruzinsky	15 November 1833 – 18 September 1899	Colonel, he was aide to the Emperor of Russia from 1860 to 1863.	He married in 1864 to Olga Frolova (1844–1902) and had 7 children: Alexander (1867–1917), Ilya (1867–c. 1947), Pyotr (1868–1922), Anastasia (1871–1956), Elisaveta (1873–c. 1901), Tamara (1874–c. 1898), and Nina (1876–1895).
	Prince Pyotr Gruzinsky	1833 or 1836 – 17 September 1855	Praporshchik of the Russian army, he was killed at the siege of Kars. He was buried at the Cathedral of Living Pillar in Mtskheta	Unmarried, without children.
	Princess Elisaveta Gruzinskaya	6 March 1836 – c. 1890	Maid of honor to the Empress of Russia.	She married in 1857 Colonel Arkady Bashmakov (1826–1880), without issue.
	Prince Dmitri Gruzinsky	1839 – 7 January 1860	Lieutenant of the Russian army, he was killed in the Caucasus War. He is buried at the Cathedral of Living Pillar in Mtskheta	Unmarried, without children.
	Princess Olga Gruzinskaya	1840 – 18 July 1913	Maid of honor to the Empress of Russia and author of memoirs, she died in Moscow.	Unmarried, without issue.
	Princess Vera Gruzinskaya	1842 – 1861	She was born in Tiflis.	Married in 1860 as his first wife General Nikolay Svyatopolk-Mirsky (1833–1898), she had a son, who died very young.
	Prince Nikolay Gruzinsky	7 August 1844 – 24 October 1916	Colonel of the Imperial Guards, he served in the Russo-Turkish War (1877–78). He was then Actual State Councilor and Jägermeister (1881), Governor of Vilno (1899)	He married in 1868 Maria Mikhailovna Katenina (died 1910) and had six children: Maria (1869–1901), Nadezhda (1871–1907), Ilya (1874–1879), Anastasia (1880–1936), Mikhail (1886–1917), and Olga (died 1902).
	Princess Aleksandra Gruzinskaya	Died 24 September 1909	Maid of honor to the Empress of Russia.	She died unmarried, without issue.
	Princess Ekaterina Gruzinskaya	Died 1888	Maid of honor to the Empress of Russia.	She died unmarried, without issue.
	Princess Nadezhda Gruzinskaya	c. 1847 – 1930	Maid of honor to the Empress of Russia.	She was married to Mikhail Aleksandrovich Pisarev. According to Burke's Royal Families of the World, she married secondly Dr. Neftel, a United States citizen and she is buried at the Mount Olivet Cemetery, New York.

== Ancestry ==
Ancestors of Prince Ilia of Georgia

16. Heraclius I of Kakheti
8. Teimuraz II
17. Ana Cholokashvili
4. Heraclius II of Georgia
18. Vakhtang VI
9. Tamar of Kartli
19. Rusudan of Circassia
2. George XII
20. Zurab Abashidze
10. Zaal Abashidze
5. Anna Abashidze
1. Ilia
12. Vakhtang Tsitsishvili
6. Giorgi Tsitsishvili
3. Mariam Tsitsishvili
14. Giorgi Guramishvili
7. Elene Guramishvili
