= Mahmad Mirza of Kakheti =

Mahmad Mirza (Georgian: მაჰმად-მირზა), also known as Levan (Georgian: ლევან; died 1733/34), was a Georgian royal prince (batonishvili) of the Kakhetian branch of the Bagrationi dynasty. He was the eldest son of King David II of Kakheti and served as governor of Ganja. According to Prince David of Georgia, he was killed while saving the life of Nader Shah during a battle against the Ottoman forces under Topal Osman Pasha.

== Biography ==
Mahmad Mirza (Levan) was the eldest son of King David II of Kakheti (Imam-Quli Khan) and his wife, Fakhrijan-Begum, daughter of Shakhrukh-Zadeh, Beglerbeg of Erivan, and granddaughter of Shamkhal. He had one younger brother, Alexander (Ali Mirza), and an unnamed sister.

The order of succession recorded in the royal charters indicates that Mahmad Mirza was not regarded as the immediate heir following the death of his father, David II. In David II's royal charters, his brothers, Constantine and Teimuraz, are listed before his sons, Mahmad Mirza and Ali Mirza. In the royal charters of King Constantine II, Prince Teimuraz is listed first, followed by David II's sons, Mahmad Mirza and Ali Mirza, and then by Teimuraz's sons, Heraclius and David. In the royal charters of King Teimuraz II, Mahmad Mirza and Ali Mirza are listed before Teimuraz's sons, Heraclius and David. According to Apolon Tabuashvili, this order of precedence reflects an established succession practice in early 18th-century Kakheti, whereby, following Constantine II, the succession was to pass first to Teimuraz, then to David II's sons, Mahmad Mirza and Ali Mirza, and only afterward to Teimuraz's own sons. Mahmad Mirza, however, never succeeded to the throne.

In 1724, Mahmad Mirza was serving as governor of Ganja after the shah had granted him the city as compensation for Erivan. When his uncle, Constantine II, was defeated by the Ottomans and sought refuge in Ganja, Mahmad Mirza refused to admit him into the city. Fearing Ottoman retaliation, the inhabitants of Ganja closed the city gates to Constantine but sent him rich gifts outside the city. Mahmad Mirza took this course of action to spare Ganja from Ottoman retaliation.

Mahmad Mirza died in a battle against Topal Osman Pasha, probably on July 19, 1733 or in 1734. (Note: The last time Mahmad Mirza is mentioned in a royal charter is in 1734, while the Battle of Samarra, when Nader Shah was defeated by Topal Osman Pasha, took place in 1733.) According to Prince David of Georgia, during a battle fought near Baghdad against the Ottoman army under Topal Osman Pasha, the Persian forces were defeated, leaving Nader Shah without a horse and in danger of capture or death. Mahmad Mirza gave the shah his own horse, enabling him to escape, but was himself surrounded and killed by Ottoman soldiers.

Prince David further states that Nader Shah later rewarded Mahmad Mirza's brother, Ali Mirza, by granting him the Kingdom of Kartli and Kakheti in recognition of Mahmad Mirza's sacrifice. He also requested Mahmad Mirza's sister, and she was subsequently sent to him.

Mahmad Mirza had three sons: Asan-Mirza (fl. 1735–1746), Ivane (fl. 1737), and Rostom-Mirza (fl. 1737).

== Bibliography ==
- Tabuashvili, Apolon (2020). ტახტის მემკვიდრეობის საკითხი XVIII საუკუნის I მესამედის კახეთის სამეფოში [Succession to the throne in the first third of the 18th century kingdom of Kakheti]. Ivane Javakhishvili Tbilisi State University.
- Brosset, Marie-Félicité (1857). Histoire moderne de la Géorgie [Modern History of Georgia] (in French). Saint Petersburg: Imperial Academy of Sciences.
- Brosset, Marie-Félicité (1856). Histoire de la Georgie depuis l'antiquite jusqu'au 19. siecle (in French). Vol. 5. l'acad. Imper. des sciences.
