= Prince Jibrael of Georgia =

Prince of Georgia (1788–1812)

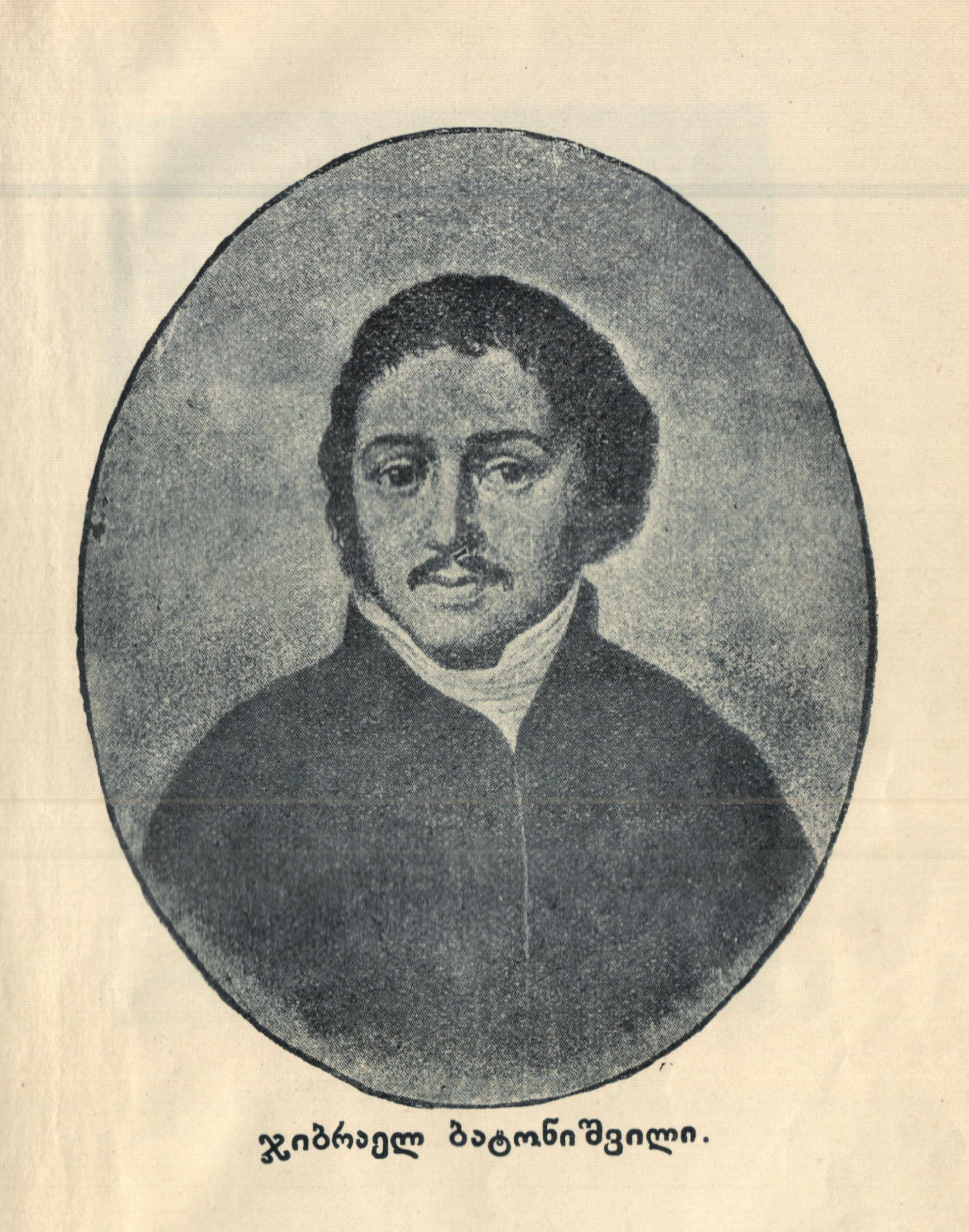

Jibrael (Georgian: ჯიბრაელი) also known as Gabriel (გაბრიელი) (13 August 1788 – 29 February 1812) was a Georgian royal prince (batonishvili) of the Bagrationi dynasty. He was a son of King George XII of Georgia by his second wife Mariam Tsitsishvili. After the Russian annexation of Georgia, he lived in Saint Petersburg, where he was known as Tsarevich Gavriil Georgiyevich (Russian: Гавриил Георгиевич).

== Biography ==
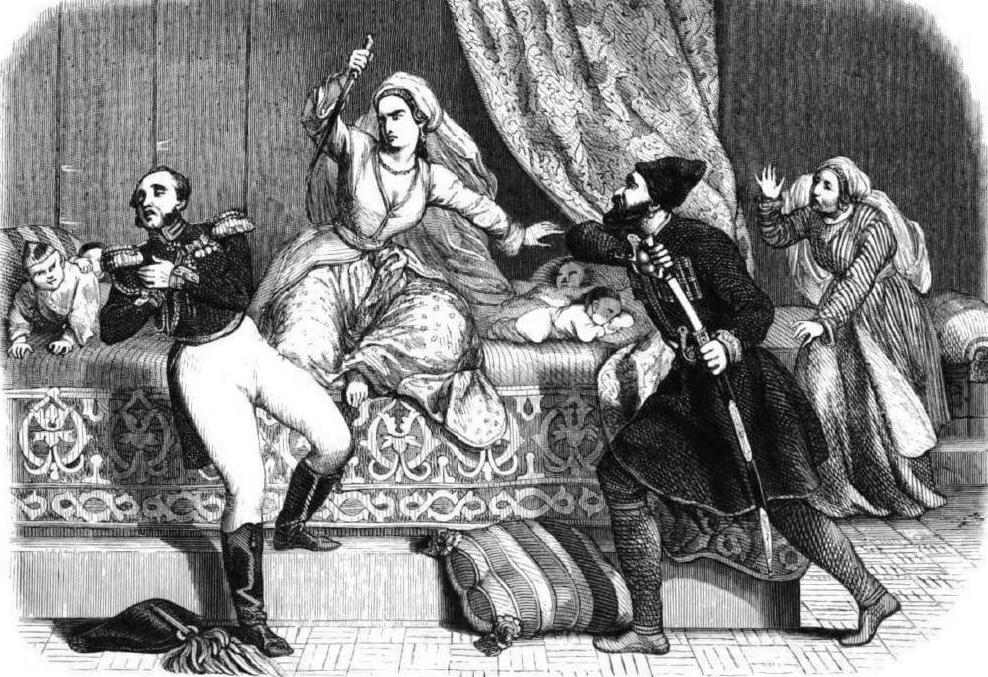
Arrest of the Queen of Georgia, Mariam Tsitsishvili. Engraving by Charles Michel Geoffroy, 1845.

Jibrael was the second son of King George XII and Queen Mariam. He was 13 years old in 1801, when the Kingdom of Kartli-Kakheti was annexed by the Russian Empire following the death of George XII and the ensuing dynastic disputes. The Russian administration considered Jibrael an unimportant member of the Georgian royal family, for his physical abilities were limited by a pronounced vertebral deformity; his elder brother, Mikheil, even petitioned the tsar to grant a pension to Jibrael on account of his being kyphotic and not suitable for military service.

Jibrael still played a role in the confrontation between the new regime and the former royal family. Thus, the Russian general Ivan Lazarev, in a communication to Saint Petersburg, accused the prince of harassing the villagers of Shilda. This Lazarev was soon tasked with overseeing the deportation of Queen Dowager Mariam and her children to Russia proper. Arriving at the queen's mansion in Tbilisi, he found his death at the hands of Mariam on 19 April 1803. One report, that by the city's commandant Major Saakadze to General Pavel Tsitsianov, indicates Jibrael's role in the incident. The report has it that the young prince and his sister Tamar, with daggers in their hands, threatened the Russian officer Surokov and his companions into leaving the queen's mansion, prompting the intervention of General Lazarev, who confronted Mariam over the resettlement issue and was stabbed to death by her. Jibrael was disarmed, arrested, and escorted to Saint Petersburg, where he lived for the rest of his life and died, unmarried and without children, at the age of 23. He was buried at the Alexander Nevsky Lavra.

== Ancestry ==
Ancestors of Prince Jibrael of Georgia

16. Heraclius I of Kakheti
8. Teimuraz II
17. Ana Cholokashvili
4. Heraclius II of Georgia
18. Vakhtang VI
9. Tamar of Kartli
19. Rusudan of Kabarda
2. George XII
20. Zurab Abashidze
10. Zaal Abashidze
5. Anna Abashidze
1. Jibrael
12. Vakhtang Tsitsishvili
6. Giorgi Tsitsishvili
3. Mariam Tsitsishvili
14. Giorgi Guramishvili
7. Elene Guramishvili
