= Arsen of Tbilisi =

Arsen of Tbilisi (Georgian: არსენ თბილელი, romanized: arsen tbileli), born Jesse (Georgian: იესე, romanized: iese) (died 30 November 1812), was a Georgian churchman and scion of the royal line of the Bagratid House of Mukhrani. Arsen was also known by the surname Naibadze (ნაიბაძე) after the title of his father. He was Metropolitan bishop of Tbilisi with the title of Tbileli from 1795 to 1810 and is known for his controversial role in the Georgian church affairs in the early years of the Russian rule.

== Early life ==
Arsen was born as Jesse, a son of Abdullah Beg of Kartli by his wife, Princess Ketevan-Begum of Kakheti. He was, thus, a grandson of two monarchs, King Jesse of Kartli on his father's side and King Heraclius I of Kakheti on his mother's side. Jesse's father, Abdullah Beg, was a convert to Islam and a pro-Iranian naib (governor) of Kartli, eventually ousted by his Kakhetian in-law Heraclius II in 1747.

Little is known about Jesse's early life. He was widowed young and retired to a monastery, taking the name of Arsen. In the 1760s, after his brother David and cousin Paata, were put to death for plotting a coup against Heraclius II, Arsen fled to the Kingdom of Imereti (western Georgia) and for many years served at the Katskhi Monastery. Eventually, through the patronage of Catholicos Anton II, a son of Heraclius II, Arsen was able to return to Kartli and appointed as a bishop of Nikozi. In 1795, Anton further elevated Arsen's rank, to the displeasure of his father, to metropolitan bishopric of Tbilisi, the capital of the kingdom, which then lay in ruins after the Iranian invasion. By 1800, his parish consisted of Tbilisi and 18 other settlements, with seven noblemen, three tavadi and four aznauri.

== Russian loyalist ==
As the Russian rule spread to Georgia in 1800, Arsen cooperated with the Russians. He served a liturgy at the Sioni Cathedral to celebrate the imperial manifesto on the Russian annexation of Georgia in February 1801. That same year, he testified against Prince Solomon Lionidze, a leading figure in anti-Russian opposition, suspected of being involved in a secret correspondence with Queen Dowager Darejan. Arsen's loyalty during the disorders in Georgia was awarded by the Russian government with the Order of Saint Anna, 2nd Class, in 1802 and a precious white klobuk with a special rescript of appreciation from Tsar Alexander I in 1807.

== Confrontation with the catholicos ==
As the Russian control of the Georgian church affairs tightened, Arsen did everything possible to secure his position against his fellow churchmen. He, thus, accused Catholicos Anton II of appropriating the church properties and denounced Dositheos Pitskhelauri, the archimandrite of Kvatakhevi, on account of being unlawfully appointed during the regency of Prince David of Georgia. In a notable incident in January 1803, Arsen was assaulted and injured in a street in Tbilisi following an argument with Anton's protege, the protoiereus Solomon, at the Sioni Cathedral. The Russian authorities suspected Solomon's children and arrested one of his sons.

In August 1809, Arsen sent a lengthy letter to Alexander I, reminding him of his past services and complaining about the pressure he experienced from Catholicos Anton. In response, in February 1810, Anton convened a church court, which ruled that Arsen should be removed from his office and sent to a remote convent on charges of misconduct, abuse of office, and corruption, which the bishop vehemently denied and filed a complaint to the Russian governor of Georgia, General Alexander Tormasov. In the meantime, the Russian government proceeded with the outright abolition of the Georgian autocephaly. Catholicos Anton was escorted to Russia in November 1810 and deposed by the Imperial decree in July 1811. Arsen quickly ran afoul of the new Russian-appointed prelate, Exarch Varlam. The defiant bishop was relieved from his position. An inquiry into allegations of his corruption was launched, but then dropped because of Arsen's death.
