= Asan Mirza of Kakheti =

Asan Mirza (Georgian: ასან-მირზა; died 1750) was the third son of King David II of Kakheti (Imam Quli Khan), he supported a pro-Iranian political orientation. He backed his brother, Alexander III (Ali Mirza), in the struggle against Teimuraz II and Heraclius II. After Alexander's death, Asan Mirza adopted a policy of loyalty toward the kings. He was later summoned to Iran by Adel Shah, where he commanded the Georgian units of the shah's guard. In 1748, he returned to Georgia with his forces. He took part in the foreign campaigns of Teimuraz II and Heraclius II. He died during the campaign against Karabakh.
