= Prince Mikheil of Georgia =

Georgian prince (1783–1862)

Mikheil
- Born: 1783; Tbilisi, Kingdom of Kartli-Kakheti
- Died: 21 November 1862 (aged 78–79); Saint Petersburg, Russian Empire
- Dynasty: Bagrationi
- Father: George XII
- Mother: Mariam Tsitsishvili
- Religion: Georgian Orthodox Church

Mikheil (Georgian: მიხეილი, romanized: mikheili; Russian: Михаил Георгиевич Грузинский, romanized: Mikhail Georgiyevich Gruzinsky; 1783 – 21 November 1862) was a son of George XII, the last king of Georgia, by his second marriage to Mariam Tsitsishvili. After the Russian annexation of Georgia in 1801, he departed to Saint Petersburg, where he spent most of his life.

== Biography ==
Prince Royal (batonishvili) Mikheil was the eldest child of George XII born of his second marriage to Mariam Tsitsishvili. He was born in Tbilisi in 1783, when George was still a crown prince and heir apparent to the throne of his reigning father, Heraclius II. During the brief and troubled reign of his father (r. 1798–1800), Mikheil, then in his teens, was involved in organizing the Georgian military. In 1800 the commander of the Russian military mission in Georgia, General Ivan Lazarev, reported that of George XII's children by his second marriage, the 16-year-old Mikheil was "the most promising... by virtue of his age"; he had organized a regular jäger regiment of his age-mates and was then training it in accordance to the Russian military standards.

George XII died in December 1800 and the Russian government proceeded with outright annexation of Georgia to the empire. Unlike several of his family members, Mikheil did not try to resist the new regime and acceded to the request from the Russian tsar Alexander I to depart for resettlement in Saint Petersburg. On this occasion, Mikheil was granted the Order of Saint Anna, 1st Class, and an annual pension from the Russian treasury. His loyalty was further appreciated by allowing him to return to his homeland in 1802. Mikheil spent the rest of his life mostly residing in St. Petersburg and provided protection and assistance to the Georgian students, such as Iona Khelashvili and Gabriel Kikodze, arriving for education in Russia. He died unmarried and without children at the age of 79 in Saint Petersburg in 1862. He was buried at the Intercession Monastery in Moscow.

== Ancestry ==
Ancestors of Prince Mikheil of Georgia

16. Heraclius I of Kakheti
8. Teimuraz II
17. Ana Cholokashvili
4. Heraclius II of Georgia
18. Vakhtang VI
9. Tamar of Kartli
19. Rusudan of Circassia
2. George XII
20. Zurab Abashidze
10. Zaal Abashidze
5. Anna Abashidze
1. Mikheil
12. Vakhtang Tsitsishvili
6. Giorgi Tsitsishvili
3. Mariam Tsitsishvili
14. Giorgi Guramishvili
7. Elene Guramishvili
