= Rusudan of Circassia =

Queen of Kartli from 1716 to 1724

Queen consort of Kartli
- Tenure: 1703–1712; 1716–1724
- Died: 30 December 1740; Moscow
- Burial: Donskoy Monastery
- Spouse: Vakhtang VI (m. 1696; died 1737)
- Issue: Tamar of Kartli; Princess Ana of Kartli; Princess Tuta of Kartli; Bakar of Kartli; Prince George of Kartli
- Religion: Georgian Orthodox Church
- Khelrtva

Rusudan (Georgian: რუსუდანი, romanized: rusudani; died 30 December 1740) was a daughter of a Circassian noble and a wife of Vakhtang VI, who ruled the Georgian kingdom of Kartli as a regent from 1703 to 1712 and a king (or a Wali from the Iranian perspective) from 1716 to 1724. She followed her husband in his exile to the Russian Empire, where she lived for the rest of her life.

== Origin ==
Rusudan's ancestry and family background are scarcely documented. "Rusudan" being the name given to the Circassian bride on her conversion to Christianity in Georgia, her original name is unrecorded as is her surname. The contemporary Georgian sources usually refer to the family of her origin as cherkez-batoni, that is, "the lord (batoni) of Circassians". The 19th-century French historian Marie-Félicité Brosset identified her father as the Lesser Kabardian chief Qilchiqo—Kul'chuk Kilimbetov of the Russian sources—who in 1693 had tried to prevent Archil II, Vakhtang's uncle, from visiting Russia. Furthermore, a Georgian document from that time mentions Vakhtang's meeting with his Kabardian in-laws, referred to as by a Georgianized surname, "Bakashvili", during the king's flight to Russia through the Circassian territory in 1724. According to Brosset's contemporary Russian author, Pyotr Butkov, Rusudan was of the Misost clan, one of the most influential families in Greater Kabardia. Butkov also makes mention of Rusudan's other possible native clan, the Talostan of Lesser Kabardia.

== Early life ==
Rusudan was initially betrothed to the young prince Bagrat, whom his father, King George XI of Kartli, had to surrender as a hostage to Shah Suleiman I in Iran, where Bagrat died c. 1692. Rusudan was not returned to her father and instead remained in Georgia. This should have offended the Circassians, prompting, as Brosset conjectured, Qilchiqo to respond vigorously to the shamkhal of Tarki's call to seize George XI's brother Archil and his entourage on their way to Russia. Archil was taken captive, but soon escaped. The shamkhal, in a fury, for he wanted Archil's capture to please the shah, punished Qilchiqo by ravaging the Circassian lands.

== Marriage to Vakhtang ==
In 1696, George XI arranged Rusudan's marriage with his nephew, Prince Vakhtang, who wed her at Kharagauli in Imereti, where George XI and his family had been displaced from Kartli after his break with the shah of Iran in 1688. That same year, George XI reconciled with the shah and was restored to Kartli. In 1703, Vakhtang acceded to the regency of Kartli for George XI and a successor, Kaikhosro, both reigning in absentia while serving in the Iranian ranks in Afghanistan, where they were both killed in separate campaigns. Vakhtang's regency was marked by a relative political and cultural revival in Kartli.

In April 1712, Vakhtang repaired to Iran to receive his investiture from Shah Soltan Hoseyn and was detained there until being forced to comply with the condition of accepting Islam in 1716. During his absence, Vakhtang's brother Simon took over the regency, being succeeded by the rule of another, Islamized brother, Jesse. During this period of time, the country became engulfed in political intrigues and factional power struggles. Rusudan, living with his sons in Gori, west of the increasingly hostile capital of Tbilisi, eventually fled Jesse's oppressive regime to the mountains of Racha. Jesse had even promised the shah to send Rusudan and her sons, and 500 families from Kartli for resettlement in Iran. She was a moderating influence on his elder son, Bakar, who sought to avenge the enemies of his father. The queen, thus, saved the Catholicos Domentius, suspected of being involved in political intrigues, from being blinded and averted the death of the general (spaspet) Luarsab Orbeliani.

== Queen consort ==
In August 1716, Vakhtang, now also known by his Muslim name of Husayn-Qoli Khan, returned to Tbilisi as king and Rusudan sat on the throne by her husband, "a luminary, sunlike queen", as the contemporary Georgian historian Sekhnia Chkheidze put it. Vakhtang's reign did not last long. In May 1723, he found himself besieged in his capital by the rival king Constantine II of Kakheti. Rusudan was evacuated to Gori and, after the fall of Tbilisi, to Imereti. Eventually, Vakhtang, accompanied by his family and a retinue fled to Russia. Rusudan lived with her husband in Astrakhan. Widowed in March 1737, she moved to Moscow, where her son, Bakar, resided. Rusudan died there, on 30 December 1740. She was buried at the Sretensky church of the Donskoy Monastery on 13 January 1741.

== Children ==
Rusudan bore five children to Vakhtang, two sons and three daughters (Vakhtang also had several extramarital children):

- Princess Tamar (1696–1746) who married, in 1712, Prince Teimuraz, the future king of Kakheti and Kartli.
- Princess Anna (Anuka) (1698–1746), who married, in 1712, Prince Vakhushti Abashidze.
- Princess Tuta (1699–1746), who married the Imeretian nobleman of the ducal family of Racha, Gedevan, Duke of the Lowlands.
- Prince Bakar (7 April 1700 – 1 February 1750), ruler of Kartli.
- Prince George (2 August 1712 – 19 December 1786), general of the Russian Empire.
