= Jesse Amilakhvari =

Jesse Amilakhvari (Georgian: იესე (იასე) ამილახვარი, romanized: iese (iase) amilakhvari; died 30 September 1787) was a Georgian statesman and military figure of the Kingdom of Kartli-Kakheti.

Although married to Khoreshan, the daughter of King Jesse of Kartli, Jesse Amilakhvari supported King Heraclius II in his struggle against his own brother-in-law, Abdullah Beg. In recognition of his loyalty, Heraclius II granted him estates in Kakheti. In 1754, following the removal of Tamaz Andronikashvili, Jesse Amilakhvari was temporarily appointed mouravi (governor) of Kiziki. In 1756, the office was restored to Tamaz Andronikashvili, while Jesse was recalled from Kiziki and appointed sakhltukhutsesi of the royal court of Kartli. He also held the rank of military commander. During the 1770s, Amilakhvari distinguished himself in campaigns against the Lezgins.
