= Anuka =

Anuka may refer to:

- Anuka Abashidze (d. 1721), a Queen consort of Imereti married to Simon of Imereti.
- Anuka (1698–1746), a daughter of king Vakhtang VI of Kartli in what is now Georgia, who married in 1712 Prince Vakhushti Abashidze
- Theodore Basil Anuka, an MP elected in the Ghanaian parliamentary election, 2000 for Builsa North
