= General Orbeliani =

General Orbeliani may refer to:

- Georgy Orbeliani (1853–1924), Imperial Russian Army lieutenant general
- Grigol Orbeliani (1804–1883), Imperial Russian Army general of the infantry
- Ivan Makarovich Orbeliani (1844–1919), Imperial Russian Army general of the cavalry
- Vakhtang Orbeliani (1812–1890), Imperial Russian Army major general
