= Grigoriy Gruzinsky =

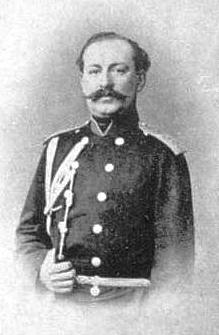
Prince Grigoriy

Grigoriy Ilyich Gruzinsky (Georgian: გრიგორი გრუზინსკი; Russian: Григорий Ильич Грузинский) (1833–1899) was a Georgian royal prince (batonishvili) of the Bagrationi dynasty.

Grigoriy was son of Prince Ilia of Georgia and grandson of King George XII of Georgia.

He was aide to the Emperor of Russia from 1860 to 1863.

== Family ==
In 1867 he married Olga Frolova (1844–1902) and had 7 children:

- Aleksandre (1866–1917)
- Ilia (1867–1947)
- Petre (1868–1922)
- Anastasia (1871–1956)
- Elizabeth (1873–1901)
- Tamar (1874–1898)
- Nino (1876–1895)
