= Alexander Amilakhvari =

- Born: 20 October 1750
- Died: 1802 (aged 51–52)
- Citizenship: Russia

Prince Alexander Amilakhvari (Georgian: ალექსანდრე ამილახვარი, Alek'sandre Amilakhvari; Russian: Александр Дмитриевич Амилахоров, Aleksandr Dmitrievich Amilakhorov) (20 October 1750 – 1802) was a Georgian nobleman and author who was a supporter of enlightened absolutism and also openly opposed King Erekle II’s rule.

A member of the Amilakhvari, one of the leading noble families of Georgia, he was involved in, along with his father, a 1765 coup plot aimed at deposing Erekle II in favour of Prince Paata, a pretender to the Georgian throne. After the plot collapsed, he was arrested and mutilated (his nose was cut). In 1771, however, he escaped from prison and fled to the Russian Empire where he joined Prince Alexander, another Georgian pretender-in-exile. With the Russo-Georgian rapprochement, Amilakhvari was arrested in 1783 by the Russian Government at Erekle’s request and held in the Vyborg prison. The 1801 amnesty resulted in Amilakhvari being granted his freedom and he was allowed to return to Georgia. However, he died while making his way back to Astrakhan.

Amilakhvari’s political pamphlet – A Georgian History – published in St. Petersburg in 1779, related his own story and described Georgia’s political and social life during the latter half of the 18th century. At the same time, the author overtly attacked the Georgian autocracy and criticised Erekle II along with every aspect of his rule. Another of his works The Sage of the Orient (ბრძენი აღმოსავლეთისა) was influenced by some of the ideas coming out of the contemporaneous French Enlightenment and was essentially a project to reform the Kingdom of Georgia based around the decentralisation of royal authority.
