= Princess Ana of Kartli =

Ana or Anuka (Georgian: ანა; ანუკა) (1698–1746) was a Georgian royal princess (batonishvili) of the royal Bagrationi dynasty of House of Mukhrani.

She was a daughter of King Vakhtang VI of Kartli by his wife Rusudan of Circassia.

She married Prince Vakhushti Abashidze (died 1751) and had 2 children, Levan and Nikoloz.
