= Prince Paata of Kartli =

Georgian pretender (1720–1765)

Paata (Georgian: პაატა; 1720 – December 1765) was a Georgian prince royal (batonishvili) of the Bagratid House of Mukhrani of Kartli. A natural son of King Vakhtang VI, Paata was brought up and educated as an artillery specialist in the Russian Empire. His adventurous life led him, through Prussia, Poland, and the Ottoman Empire, to his native Kartli, where he was in service of King Heraclius II, a son of his half-sister, until he led a plot to kill Heraclius and seize the throne for himself in 1765. After the conspiracy was discovered, Paata was tried, sentenced to death through decapitation on 5 December 1765 and soon executed.

== Early life ==
Prince Paata was a royal bastard, an extramarital son of King Vakhtang VI, born of an unknown concubine in 1720. In 1724, Vakhtang lost his throne to the Ottoman invasion and fled to Russia, bringing with him his family, Paata included, and a retinue of 1,200. The young prince attended a military college in Saint Petersburg and passed an examination in the art and science of artillery. In the absence of a suitable vacancy of an artillery officer, Paata was commissioned as a lieutenant-colonel in an infantry regiment, but he never actually served in the army. After the death of his father in 1737, Paata experienced great financial difficulty and obtained an annual pension of 300 rubles from the Russian government in 1740. In 1745, he petitioned the government to be allowed to return to Georgia or to assign him to a proper position in the imperial service, but nothing came of this.

== Adventures ==
In January 1749, Paata, embittered by life on an insignificant pension, escaped from Russia and arrived, via Riga, Mitava, and Memel, in Königsberg and sought, in vain, to enter the service of Frederick II of Prussia. Afterwards, he departed to Warsaw and then, through Kamenets and Bucharest, traveled to Constantinople in August 1749. Eventually, in 1752, he declared himself in the Georgian capital of Tbilisi before Teimuraz II and his son Heraclius II of Kakheti, who accepted Paata's service. Enjoying a reputation of a learned and European-educated man, Paata was tasked with reorganizing the Iranian-modeled Georgian artillery along the Russian lines. Inclined toward contrariness, he refused to accompany his new sovereign in a campaign against Ganja in 1752. He was put in prison, but in 1754 escaped to the western Georgian kingdom of Imereti, where he rendered support to Prince Levan Abashidze, intriguing against his own grandson, King Solomon I of Imereti. Paata then made his way to Iran, but failed to gain a favor with its ruler, Karim Khan Zand, and returned to Georgia. He was pardoned by Heraclius II, now sitting on the throne of both Kartli and Kakheti, and appointed a military adviser to the king and then, governor (mouravi) of Tbilisi.

== Conspiracy and death ==
In 1765, Paata's Tbilisi apartment—rented from the certain Markozashvili—became a meeting ground for the nobles of Kartli disaffected with Heraclius II. The resulting plot to assassinate the king and place Paata on the throne was formed under varying circumstances: the Mukhranian royals, as well as their legitimist supporters, could not reconcile themselves with the establishment of their Kakhetian cousins, in the person of Heraclius II, on the throne of Kartli. Furthermore, the leading noble families, such as the Tsitsishvili and Amilakhvari, resented Heraclius's decision to settle former Georgian slaves liberated from foreign captivity as freemen on royal land, rather than returning these peasants as serfs to their former landlords. Prince Dimitri Amilakhvari, one of the principal ringleaders, also had a personal reason to hate his sovereign: he felt himself insulted in the person of his son, Giorgi, whose marriage to Heraclius's sister, Princess Elisabed, had been disrupted by the king.

Datuna, an artisan from Samshvilde and the husband of a royal nursemaid, who was to guide the conspirators into the king's palace, admitted to being part of the plot in a confession to a priest, who immediately informed Heraclius. The king had the conspirators rounded up and tried in public by a court appointed of the aristocracy as well as peasants. Heraclius testified himself, leaving verdicts and sentences to the court. Twenty-two persons, reportedly including the polyglot poet Sayat-Nova, were acquitted. The leaders were punished with death or mutilation. Among them, Paata and his cousin, David, son of Abdullah Beg, were beheaded, David's father-in-law, Prince Elizbar Taktakishvili, was burned to death, Dimitri Amilakhvari was dispossessed of all of his titles and properties and his son, Alexander, had his nose cut off, Prince Glakha Tsitsishvili lost his tongue, others lost their sight.
