= Mariam Tsitsishvili =

Queen of Georgia 1798–1800 (1768–1850)

Mariam Tsitsishvili მარიამ ციციშვილი
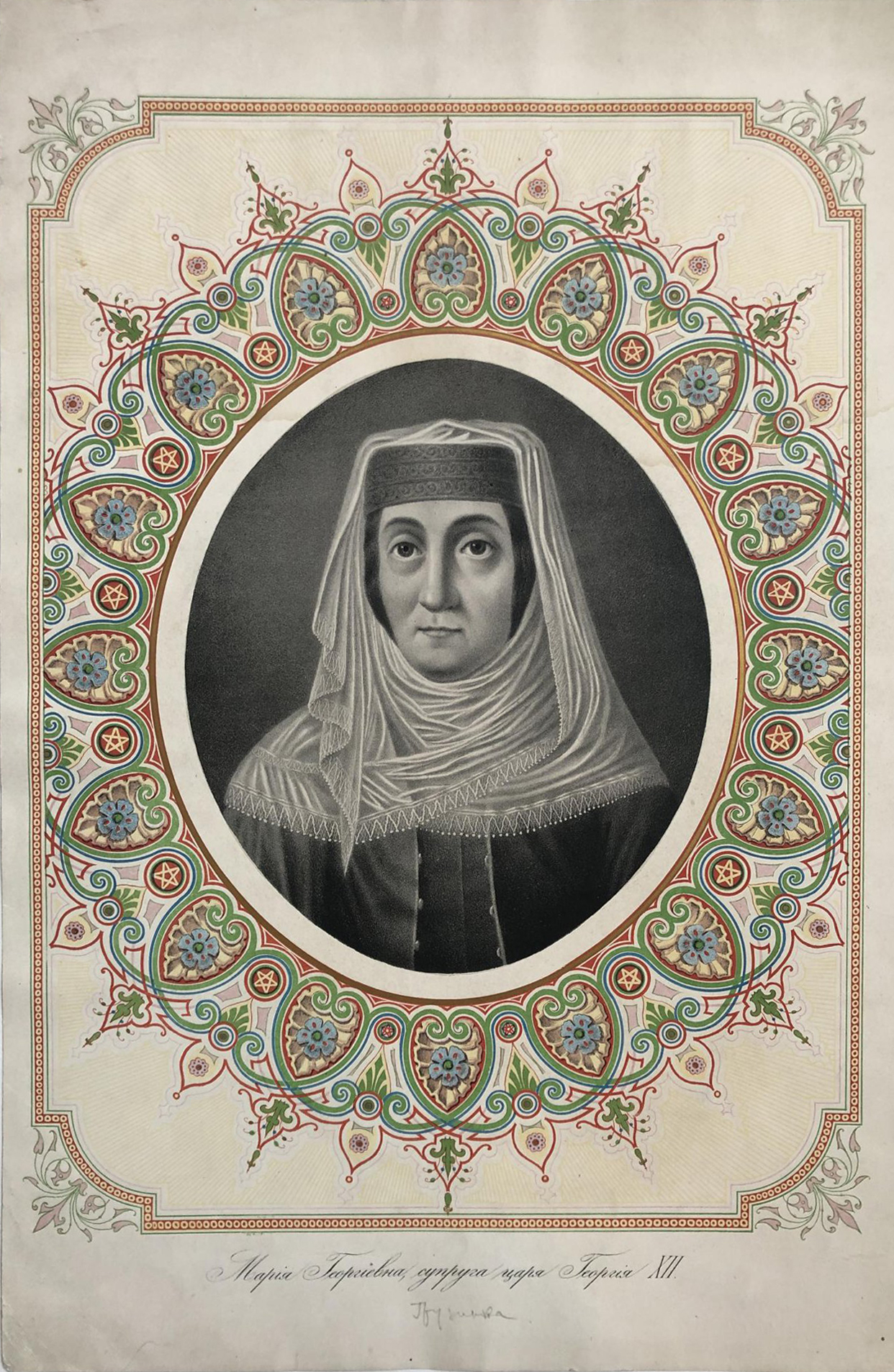

Queen consort of Kartli and Kakheti
- Tenure: 11 January 1798 – 28 December 1800
- Born: 9 April 1768; Tbilisi, Kingdom of Kartli-Kakheti
- Died: 30 March 1850 (aged 81); Moscow, Russian Empire
- Burial: Svetitskhoveli Cathedral
- Spouse: George XII of Georgia
- Dynasty: Tsitsishvili (by birth); Bagrationi (by marriage)
- Father: Prince Giorgi Tsitsishvili
- Religion: Georgian Orthodox Church
- Khelrtva

Princess Mariam Tsitsishvili (Georgian: მარიამ ციციშვილი; 9 April 1768 – 30 March 1850), also known as Maria in European sources, was the Queen of Georgia (Kartli-Kakheti) as the second wife and consort of the last King George XII of Georgia (reigned from 1798 to 1800).

== Family and early life ==
Princess Mariam Tsitsishvili was born in Tbilisi to Prince Giorgi Tsitsishvili and Princess Elena Guramishvili. By birth she was a member of one of the preeminent noble houses of Georgia. George XII, then Heir Apparent to the Georgian throne, married her on 13 July 1783 after the death of his first wife, Princess Ketevan Andronikashvili (1754–1782). Mariam gave birth to eleven children: eight sons and three daughters:

- Prince Mikheil (1783–1862);
- Prince Jibrael (1788–1812);
- Princess Tamar (1789–1851);
- Princess Ana (1789–1796);
- Prince Ilia (1790–1854), who married Princess Anastasia Grigoryevna Obolonskaya;
- Prince Joseph, who died young;
- Prince Spiridon, who died young;
- Prince Okropir (1795–1857), who married Countess Anna Pavlovna Kutaisova;
- Prince Simon (born 1796), who died young;
- Prince Heraclius (1797–1859);
- Princess Ana (1800–1850), who married firstly Prince Eustache Abashidze and secondly Prince David Tsereteli.

== Later life ==
When George died on 18 December 1800, Paul I of Russia, an official protector of the Kingdom of Georgia, did not allow his heir, David, to be crowned king, and abolished the Georgian monarchy, annexing the kingdom to the Russian Empire.

In 1802, the newly established Russian administration started deporting the members of Georgian royal family to Russia proper. In April 1803, the Russian commander in Georgia, Prince Pavel Tsitsianov, himself a Russified Georgian and ironically a distant relative of the Georgian queen, heard that Mariam was planning to flee to the strongholds of Khevsureti with the aid of loyal mountainous clansmen who were resolutely opposed to the Russian rule.

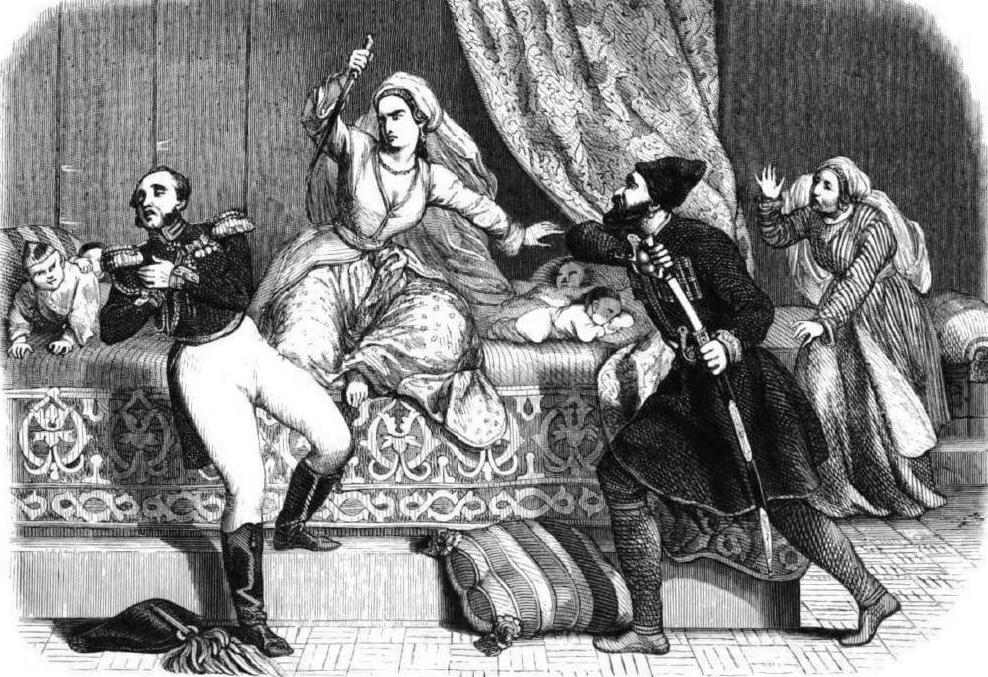
Arrest of the Queen of Georgia. Engraving by Charles Michel Geoffroy, 1845.

Tsitsianov gave orders to Major-General Ivan Petrovich Lazarev that the queen and her children should be immediately removed from Georgia under guard. The very next morning, 22 April 1803, the Russian soldiers arrived at Queen’s mansion and Lazarev ordered Mariam to get up and be ready for departure, but the queen refused to follow him. The general then took hold of her foot, to make her rise from the cushion on which she was sitting, surrounded by her sleeping children. Mariam, indignant at the attempt to take her by force, drew the dagger from beneath the cushion and stabbed Lazarev, killing him on the spot. Lazarev’s interpreter drew his saber, and gave her a wound in the head, so that she fell down insensible. The soldiers burst into the bedroom and arrested the queen and her children.

== Life in Russia ==
Escorted by a considerable armed force, they were carried away to Russia through the Darial Pass. During her passage through Georgia, the inhabitants came out to testify their loyalty to the queen and bade her farewell. She was kept into confinement at the Belogorodsky Convent at Voronezh until 1811 and then permitted to reside in Moscow. Little is known about Mariam’s life in Moscow, but she is known to have been regularly visited by Georgian students whom she helped financially. She died there at 82 and was interred at Svetitskhoveli Cathedral in Mtskheta, Georgia, with regal honors.

The tragic story of Queen Mariam was described in several contemporary accounts, based on the reports of eyewitnesses, and found its place in European literature of that time.

== Notes ==
Mariam Tsitsishvili Tsitsishvili family Born: 11 January 1798 Died: 28 December 1800
Royal titles
Preceded by Darejan Dadiani	Queen consort of Kartli and Kakheti; 11 January 1798 – 28 December 1800	Monarchy abolished
