= Georgy Orbeliani =

Georgy Ilyich Orbeliani
- Гео́ргий Ильи́ч Орбелиа́ни
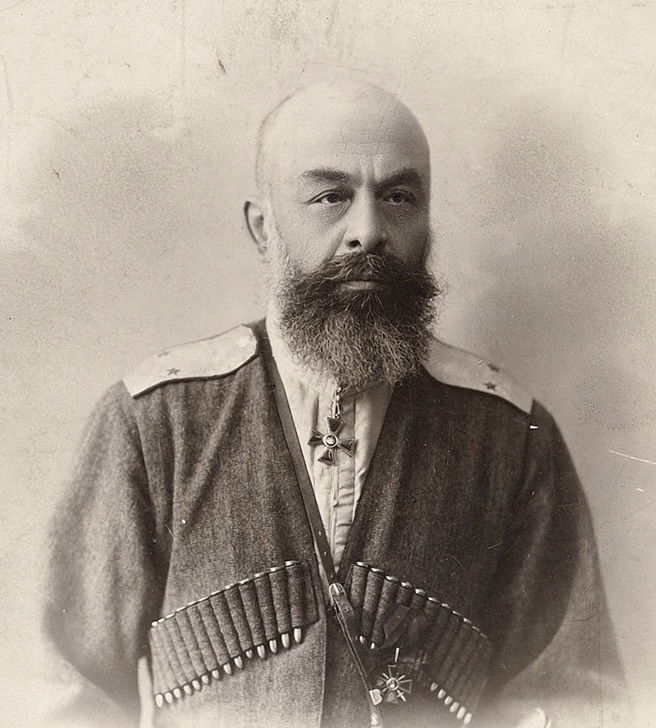
- Prince Georgy Ilyich Orbeliani
- Born: 1853; Tiflis, Tiflis Governorate, Russian Empire
- Died: 1924 (aged 70–71); Tiflis, Georgian Soviet Socialist Republic, Soviet Union
- Military career
- Allegiance: Russian Empire
- Branch: Imperial Russian Army
- Rank: Lieutenant general
- Conflicts: Russo-Turkish War; Russo Japanese War

Prince Georgy Ilyich Orbeliani (Georgian: გიორგი ილიას ძე ორბელიანი; Russian: Гео́ргий Ильи́ч Орбелиа́ни; 1853–1924) was a general in the Imperial Russian Army during the Russo-Japanese War of 1904–1905.

== Biography ==
Orbeliani was born in 1853 in Tiflis (present day Tbilisi, Georgia), part of the Russian Empire. He was the son of General Prince Ilya Dmitriyevich Orbeliani, a scion of the noble House of Orbeliani, and Princess Varvara Ilyinichna Bagration-Gruzinskaya, daughter of Prince Ilia of Georgia. After graduating from the Page Corps, Georgy entered service as a junior officer in the prestigious Hussar Regiment of the Imperial Life Guards.

Orbeliani first saw combat in the Caucasus theater of the Russo-Turkish War (1877-1878), during which he was awarded the Order of St. Anne (4th class) and Order of St. Vladimir (4th class with swords and bow) for bravery in combat. He was subsequently posted to the Transcaspian Region after the Panjdeh Incident as part of the commission to fix the border of the Russian Empire with Afghanistan. From 1898 to 1899, Orbeliani was a military attache posted to British India, where he observed the maneuvers of the British Indian Army.

Orbeliani was promoted to major general in 1904 and assigned command of the Caucasian Cavalry Brigade, which played an active role in the Russo-Japanese War of 1904–1905 in Manchuria. War correspondent Francis McCullagh commented on the diverse ethnic backgrounds of Orbeliani's Brigade in his book With the Cossacks, but also mentioned that most of his men could not communicate well with other units due to their lack of ability in the Russian language. Orbeliani was awarded with the Order of St. Stanislav (1st class with swords) and Order of St. Anne (1st class with swords) and the Golden Sword of St. George for bravery.

Following the end of the war, Orbeliani was appointed commander of the Kuban Cossack Army in 1910 with the rank of lieutenant general. He went into the reserves in November 1913.

Orbeliani returned to active duty at the start of World War I, and was appointed supreme commander of medical evacuation services. He died in 1924.

== Honors ==
- Order of St. Anne 4th degree 1878
- Order of St Vladimir, 4th degree, 1878
- Order of St. Stanislaus 1st degree 1904.
- Order of St. Anne 1st degree 1904
- Golden Sword of St. George, "for Bravery," 1904

== Family ==
Prince Orbeliani was married to Princess Mariam Alexandrovna Orbeliani (1868–1915). Their children were:

- Irakly G. Orbeliani (1890–1937), married by civil ceremony to Ariadna Dmitriyevna Rimsky-Korsakova (1899-?); no offspring
- Mariam G. Orbeliani (1899–1947), married to Prince Nikolai (Tengiz, Tatarkhan) Alexandrovich (Tsiokhovich) Dadeshkeliani (1893–1961)
