= Abdullah Beg of Kartli =

Georgian royal prince (1713–1762)

- Batonishvili

Naib (Viceroy) of Kartli
- In Office: 1737–1740s
- Shah: Nader

Prince of Somkhiti and Sabaratiano
- Tenure: 1747
- Born: Archil; Before 1713
- Died: After 1762
- Spouse: Ketevan-Begum of Kakheti
- Issue Among others: Arsen of Tbilisi
- Dynasty: Bagrationi
- Father: Jesse of Kartli
- Religion: Shia Islam

Abdullah Beg (Georgian: აბდულა-ბეგი, romanized: abdula-begi) or Archil (Georgian: არჩილი, romanized: archili; fl. 1713–1762) was a Georgian royal prince (batonishvili) of the House of Mukhrani of the Bagrationi dynasty and claimant to the kingship of Kartli in the 1740s.

== Biography ==
Abdullah Beg was the eldest son of Jesse (Ali Quli Khan), a Muslim ruler of Kartli in central and eastern Georgia, by a concubine. Himself a Muslim convert, Abdullah Beg served as a naib (viceroy) of Kartli for the Iranian shah Nader in 1737 and in the 1740s. In 1744 Teimuraz II and Heraclius II of the rival Kakhetian branch of the Bagrationi ascended the thrones of Kartli and Kakheti, respectively. Teimuraz made Abdullah Beg a prince of Somkhiti and Sabaratiano (Kvemo Kartli) with the residence at Samshvilde. In 1747, Teimuraz made a trip to Iran, leaving his son Heraclius II in charge of Kartli and Abdullah Beg as his lieutenant. In Teimuraz’s absence, however, Abdullah Beg attempted a coup, recruited the Dagestani mercenaries and took control of the capital city, Tbilisi, with the help of a local Iranian garrison. Fighting continued into the following year until Abdullah Beg was finally defeated and Tbilisi captured by Heraclius' loyal army. Thereafter the prince disappeared from history.

== Family ==
Abdullah Beg was married to Ketevan-Begum (fl. 1742–1752), a illegitimate daughter of Heraclius I of Kakheti. Their children were:

- Prince Aghas (died c. 1747 or 1765);
- Prince Rostom-Mirza (fl. 1736–1755);
- Arsen of Tbilisi (Prince Jesse) (died 1812), Metropolitan Bishop of Tbilisi from 1795 to 1810;
- Prince David (died 1765), who was married to Tinatin, daughter of Elizbar Taktakishvili. David was involved in a plot led by his cousin, Prince Paata of Kartli, to seize the throne from Heraclius II. After the plot was discovered, Heraclius II had David beheaded;
- Prince Asan-Mirza (fl. 1736);
- Princess Mariam-Begum (fl. 1753–1818), who was first married to Azad Khan Afghan and later to Revaz, son of Prince Papuna Andronikashvili.

== Bibliography ==
- Toumanoff, Cyril (1976). Manuel de Généalogie et de Chronologie pour l'histoire de la Caucasie chrétienne (Arménie, Géorgie, Albanie) [Manual of Genealogy and Chronology of Christian Caucasian History (Armenia, Georgia, Albania)] (in French). Rome: Edizioni Aquila.
