= David II of Kakheti =

King of Kakheti from 1703 to 1722

David II
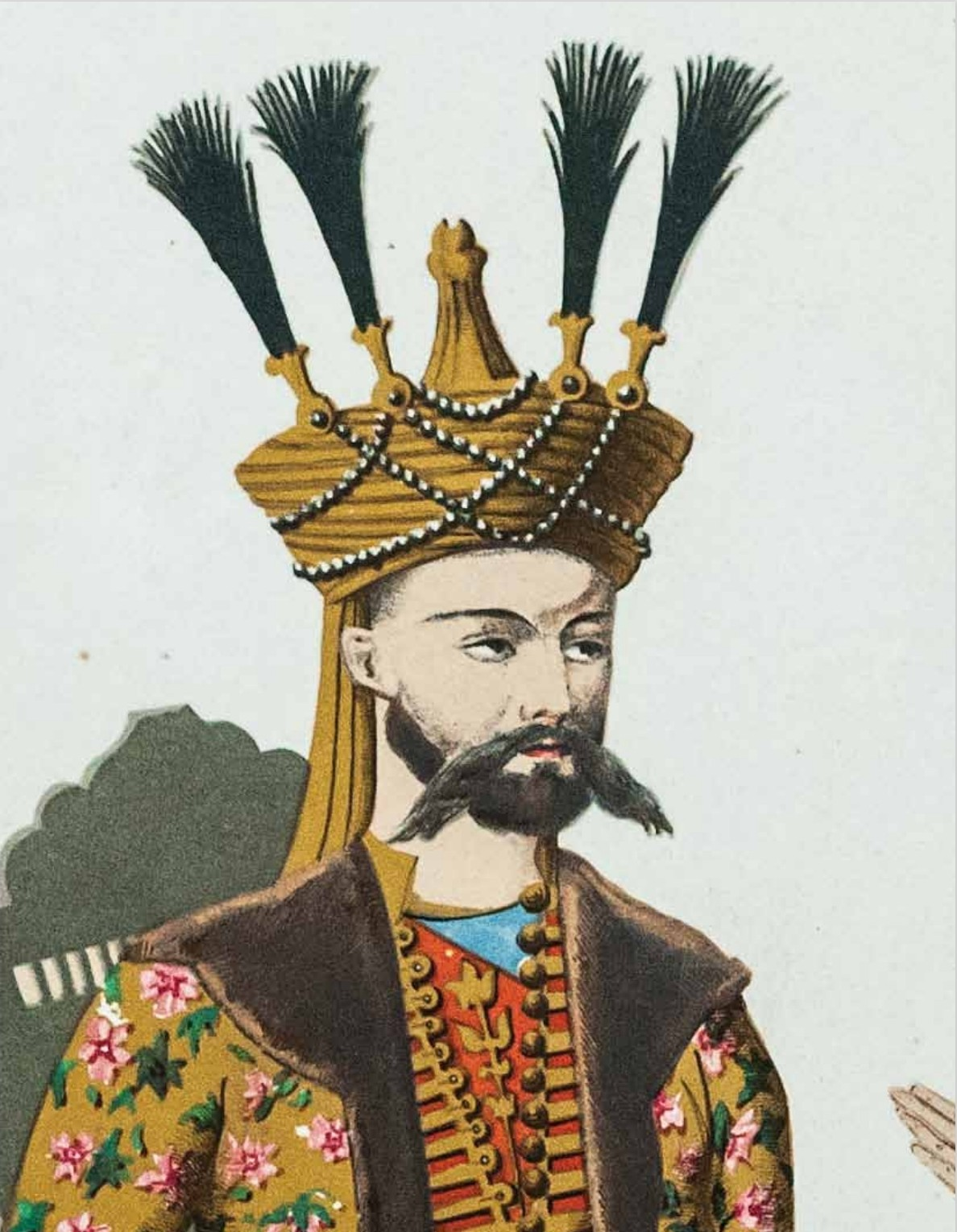
- Portrait by Grigory Gagarin, published 1847

King of Kakheti
- Reign: 1703–1722
- Predecessor: Heraclius I
- Successor: Constantine II
- Regent: Prince Teimuraz (1709–1715)
- Born: 1678; Isfahan, Safavid Iran
- Died: 2 November 1722 (aged 43–44)
- Burial: Qom, Safavid Iran
- Spouse: Yatri-Jahan-Begum
- Issue Among others: Mahmad-Mirza (Levan); Alexander III of Kakheti; Asan Mirza
- Dynasty: Bagrationi
- Father: Heraclius I of Kakheti
- Mother: Ana Cholokashvili
- Religion: Shia Islam prev. Georgian Orthodox Church
- Khelrtva

David II (Georgian: დავით II, romanized: davit II; 1678 – 2 November 1722), also known as Imam-Quli Khan (Persian: امام قلی خان, romanized: Emāmqolī Khān; Georgian: იმამყული-ხანი), of the Bagrationi dynasty, was a king (mepe) of Kakheti in eastern Georgia from 1703 to 1722. Although a Muslim and a loyal vassal of the Safavid Iran, he failed to ensure his kingdom's security and most of his reign was marked by razzias (called Lekianoba) - incessant inroads by the Dagestani mountainous clansmen.

== Biography ==
David was a son of King Heraclius I of Kakheti and Queen Ana Cholokashvili. He was born and raised at the shah’s court at Isfahan and installed as wali (viceroy) of Kakheti upon his father's retirement to Iran in 1703. David resided at Qara Aghach or Qaraghaji in eastern Kakheti, on the borders of Shirvan, but had to move his residence to Telavi after he failed to recover Balakan from the Lesgians of Char and lost Qakh to them in 1706. After the death of his father in 1709, David was ordered to Isfahan to receive his investiture from Shah Husayn, leaving his younger brother Teimuraz and mother Anna in charge of the government.

The years of his obliged absence at the Shah's court (1711–15), were troubled by the Dagestan attacks and peasant revolts. Returning to Kakheti, David attempted to bring the situation under control. He made an alliance with Jesse, ruler of the neighboring Georgian kingdom of Kartli, and marched against Dagestan, but he suffered a heavy defeat in 1715 and failed to prevent settlements of the Lezgins in the Kakhetian borderlands. In December 1719, he met Vakhtang VI and negotiated a new alliance against the Dagestani clans. Early in 1720, reinforcements sent by Vakhtang under the command of Prince Erasti Kaplanishvili arrived in Kakheti, but David refrained from launching another expedition and sent the Kartlian army back home.

David died at his summer residence at Magharo in 1722 and was buried at Qum, Iran.

== Family ==
David was married to Yatri-Jahan-Begum (fl. 1722), daughter of Shakhrukh-Zadeh, Beglerbeg of Erivan, granddaughter of the Shamkhal, and sister of Fath-Ali Khan Daghestani. His children were:

- Nazarali-Khan (fl. 1708–1746);
- Mahmad-Mirza (Levan) (died 1733/1734), who was killed in a battle against Topal Osman Pasha;
- Alexander III of Kakheti (Ali-Mirza) (died 1739), King of Kartli (fl. 1735–1736) and Kakheti (fl. 1735–1739);
- Asan-Mirza (died 1750);
- Mahmad-Riza (fl. 1724);
- Khalnar-Mirza (fl. 1733–1734);
- Ketevan-Khanum (fl. 1734);
- Ali-Khan, an illegitimate son.

== Bibliography ==
- Mikaberidze, Alexander (ed., 2007). David II (Imam Quli Khan). Dictionary of Georgian National Biography. Accessed October 9, 2007.
- Mikaberidze, Alexander (2015). Historical Dictionary of Georgia (2 ed.). Rowman & Littlefield. p. 249. ISBN 978-1442241466.
- (in Georgian) დავით II (კახეთის მეფე). People.Istoria.Ge. Accessed October 9, 2007.
- Brosset, Marie-Félicité (1856). Histoire de la Georgie depuis l'antiquite jusqu'au 19. siecle (in French). Vol. 5. l'acad. Imper. des sciences.
- Brosset, Marie-Félicité (1857). Histoire moderne de la Géorgie [Modern History of Georgia] (in French). Saint Petersburg: Imperial Academy of Sciences.
- Toumanoff, Cyril (1976). Manuel de Généalogie et de Chronologie pour l'histoire de la Caucasie chrétienne (Arménie, Géorgie, Albanie) [Manual of Genealogy and Chronology of Christian Caucasian History (Armenia, Georgia, Albania)] (in French). Rome: Edizioni Aquila.

Preceded by Heraclius I	King of Kakheti; 1703–1722	Succeeded by Constantine II
