= Vakhushti Abashidze =

Georgian nobleman

Vakhushti Abashidze (Georgian: ვახუშტი აბაშიძე; fl. 1709 – died 1751) was a Georgian nobleman, prominent in the politics of the Kingdom of Kartli and one of the leaders of an insurrection against the Iranian hegemony in the 1740s.

== Biography ==
Vakhushti Abashidze came from an influential princely family from Imereti, a kingdom in western Georgia. His name Vakhushti derives from Old Iranian vahišta- ("paradise", superlative of veh "good", i.e., "superb, excellent"). Its equivalent in Middle Persian is wahišt and in New Persian behešt.

In 1711, he left a war-ridden Imereti after the downfall of his powerful uncle, Giorgi-Malakia Abashidze, and crossed into the eastern Georgian kingdom of Kartli to put himself under the suzerainty of King Vakhtang VI. On this occasion, Vakhushti Abashidze was bestowed with estates in western Kartli, belonging to the extinct line of his cousins, Princes Abashidze of Kvishkheti, and given, in 1712, King Vakhtang's daughter Anuka (1698–1746) in marriage. In his turn, the king benefited by having a new vassal, whose patrimonial estate, the village of Vakhani with its fortress, controlled one of the routes used by the Akhaltsikhe-based Turk and Lezgins marauders for their raids into western Kartli. Vakhushti Abashidze remained in Kartli even after his royal father-in-law left the upheaval in the kingdom to the Russian Empire in 1724. His relations with the Imeretian kings were strained; in 1735, the troops sent by King Alexander V of Imereti attacked Abashidze at Tedzeri and made him prisoner. Through his wife's efforts, the pasha of Akhaltsikhe intervened militarily and put Alexander to flight, but it was only in 1740 that Vakhushti Abashidze was released. In 1742, he joined the rebellion led by Prince Givi Amilakhvari (1689–1754) against the Iranian hegemony in Kartli, which was eventually defeated through the efforts of the Georgian royal princes Teimuraz II and Heraclius II, who would emerge, as a result, as new leaders of eastern Georgia.
