= Alexander III of Kakheti =

Prince of the Georgian Bagrationi dynasty

Alexander III

King of Kakheti
- Reign: 1735–1738
- Predecessor: Teimuraz II
- Successor: Teimuraz II
- Co-king: Teimuraz II (1735–1738)

King of Kartli
- Reign: August 1735– October 1736
- Predecessor: Interregnum
- Successor: Archil (Abdullah Beg)
- Died: 1739 (or 1737)
- Spouse: Mariam of Ksani
- Dynasty: Bagrationi
- Father: David II of Kakheti
- Mother: Fakhrijan-Begum
- Religion: Shia Islam prev. Georgian Orthodox Church

Alexander III (Georgian: ალექსანდრე III, romanized: aleksandre III; died 23 November 1737 or 1739) also known as Ali-Mirza (Georgian: ალი-მირზა), was a king (mepe) of the Georgian Bagrationi dynasty of the Kingdom of Kakheti who ruled in eastern Georgian provinces – Kartli and Kakheti – for the shah of Iran in the late 1730s. Like his father, King David II (Imam-Quli Khan), and brothers, Ali-Mirza was a convert to Islam. As a ruler of Kakheti, he is sometimes known in modern historiography by his Christian name Alexander and ascribed the regnal number "Third". Despite his power being derived from the shah, Ali Mirza followed the established Georgian tradition to style himself as "king of kings".

== Wali of Kartli and Kakheti ==
Ali-Mirza was made a viceroy (wali) at Tbilisi, the capital of the kingdom of Kartli, in August 1735, by the Iranian warlord Nader after the victory over the Ottomans. The Persian officer Safi Khan was appointed to watch by him and the Muslim Georgian Ali Quli-Bek Amirejibi was placed in charge of collecting taxes. Ali-Mirza failed to gain foothold in the restive province and ran afoul of Safi Khan. In October 1736, Nader, now the shah of Iran, replaced Ali-Mirza with the Muslim Georgian prince Abdullah Beg, moving him to the government of Kakheti, from where his paternal uncle, Teimuraz, had been removed by Nader and was then accompanying the shah on the road to Kandahar.

Unable to gain popularity with the local population and facing an unrest, Ali-Mirza was equally disturbed by the pressure from his Iranian suzerains. In 1736, he even wrote to the Empress Anna of Russia, describing the difficult conditions of his reign and asking her for protection. Feeling that the shah now favored the more able Teimuraz, Ali-Mirza, under the influence of Prince Abel Andronikashvili, contemplated a revolt in Kakheti. To this end, he attempted, but failed to enlist the support of Teimuraz's consort, Tamar, who feared for the fate of her husband and son. Tamar, through the service of Prince Givi Cholokashvili, secured the loyalty of Kiziki and Pshavi, dissuading Ali-Mirza from his design. In a state of despair, Ali-Mirza repaired to Nader's camp in Kandahar, where he took command of the shah's Georgian regiments and died in a battle in 1737 or 1739.

== Family ==
Ali-Mirza was married to Mariam, daughter of Shanshe, Duke of Ksani.

Regnal titles
Preceded by Teimuraz II	King of Kakheti; 1735–1738; With: Teimuraz II	Succeeded by Teimuraz II
Preceded by Interregnum	King of Kartli; 1735–1736	Succeeded by Abdullah Beg
