= Constantine II of Kakheti =

King of Kakheti from 1722 to 1732

Constantine II
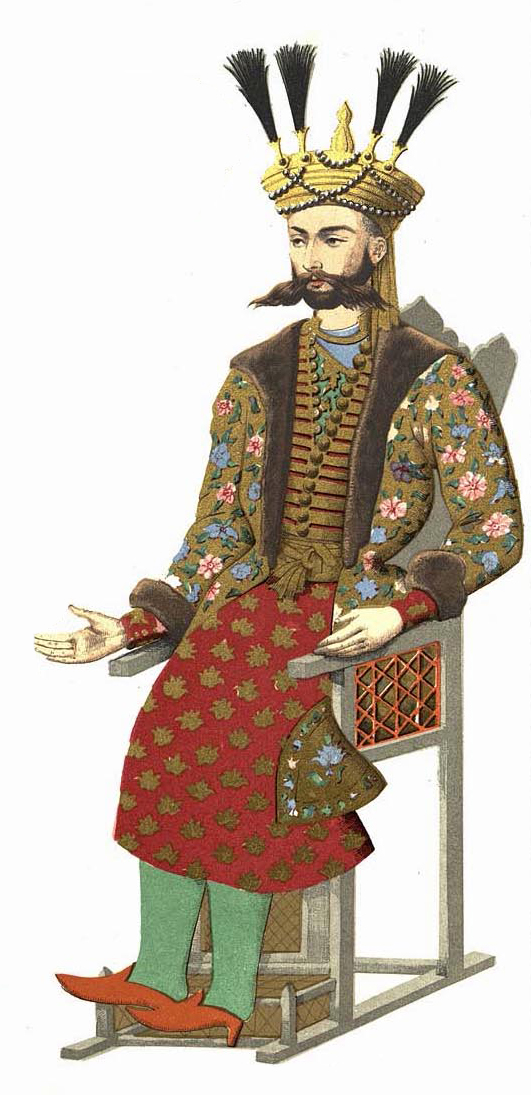
- Portrait by Grigory Gagarin, published 1847

King of Kakheti
- Reign: 1722–1732
- Predecessor: David II
- Successor: Teimuraz II
- Born: Isfahan, Safavid Iran
- Died: December 28, 1732
- Spouse: Perejan-Begum of Tarki
- Dynasty: Bagrationi
- Father: Heraclius I of Kakheti
- Religion: shia Islam
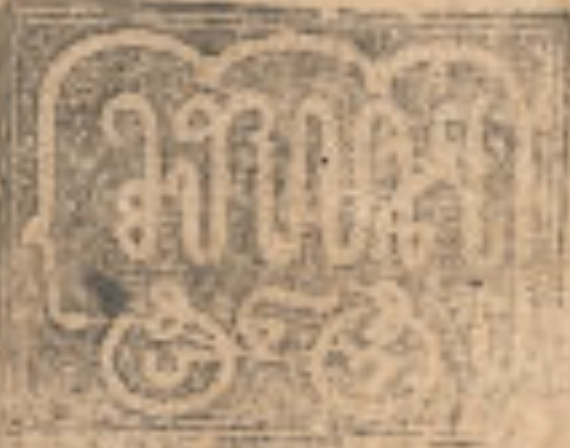
- Khelrtva

Constantine II (Georgian: კონსტანტინე II, romanized: k'onst'ant'ine II; died December 28, 1732), also known as Mahmad-Quli Khan (Georgian: მაჰმად ყული-ხანი, romanized: mahmad q'uli-khani, Persian: محمدقلی‌خان), was the king (mepe) of Kakheti in eastern Georgia from 1722 to 1732.

Contantine was the son of Heraclius I of Kakheti. Raised in the Iranian capital of Isfahan as a Shia Muslim, he was appointed King of Kakheti by the Iranian shah after the death of his brother David II. He frequently fought with Vakhtang VI of Kartli, his western neighbor and kinsman, and for a time occupied the city of Tbilisi. During the Ottoman occupation of the South Caucasus, Constantine alternatively attempted to cooperate with and resist the Ottomans. In the early 1730s, as Nader Khan (the future Nader Shah) was campaigning to recover the lost Iranian territories in the west, Constantine attempted to break with the Ottomans. However, he was assassinated during negotiations with an Ottoman commander in 1732.

== Biography ==
A son of Heraclius I of Kakheti by a concubine, he was born and raised as a Muslim in Isfahan, the royal capital of Safavid Iran. In 1703, the Shah of Iran Sultan Husayn appointed him a darugha (prefect) of his capital. In 1722, he was confirmed by the shah as King of Kakheti following the death of Constantine's brother David II (Imām Qulī Khān). At the same time, he was bestowed with the governorship of Erivan, Ganja, and Karabakh. He frequently feuded with his western neighbor and kinsman, Vakhtang VI of Kartli, who was declared by the Persian government deposed in 1723. On the Shah's orders, Constantine marched to take control of Vakhtang's capital Tbilisi. On May 4, 1723, he captured the city, but failed to evict Vakhtang and his son Bakar from the province of Shida Kartli.

Meanwhile, the Ottoman army invaded the Georgian lands in order to eliminate the Persian hegemony there. Constantine tried to negotiate with the Ottoman commander Ibrahim-Pasha and surrendered Tbilisi on June 12, 1723. However, Vakhtang VI managed to bribe Ibrahim-Pasha who installed Prince Bakar as governor of Kartli and arrested Constantine. Soon, Bakar conspired with Constantine, his former rival, against the Ottoman overlords and helped him flee to his possessions in Kakheti. A revolt failed, however, and Bakar had to join his father Vakhtang VI in his Russian exile in 1724. Constantine withdrew into the mountains whence he led resistance against the Turks. In 1725, he succeeded in reestablishing himself in Kakheti. He made peace with the Ottomans who recognized him as king in exchange for his conversion to Sunni Islam and paying an annual tribute.

Early in the 1730s, as Nader Khan Afshar pushed his quest to revive the Persian empire, Constantine made a fatal attempt to break with the Turks. He was murdered at Bezhanbagh on December 28, 1732, during negotiations with Yusuf Pasha of Akhaltsikhe, the commander of the invading Ottoman troops. The Turks gave his throne to his Christian brother, Teimuraz II.

== Personal life ==
Constantine was married to Perejan-Begum of Tarki, daughter of the Shamkal, and sister of beglarbeg of Shiraz.

== Sources ==
- Mikaberidze, Alexander (2015). Historical Dictionary of Georgia (2 ed.). Rowman & Littlefield. pp. 237–238. ISBN 978-1442241466.
- Toumanoff, Cyril (1976). Manuel de Généalogie et de Chronologie pour l'histoire de la Caucasie chrétienne (Arménie, Géorgie, Albanie) [Manual of Genealogy and Chronology of Christian Caucasian History (Armenia, Georgia, Albania)] (in French). Rome: Edizioni Aquila.

Preceded by David II	King of Kakheti; 1722–1732	Succeeded by Teimuraz II
Preceded by Mehr-Ali Khan	Governor of Erivan Province (Chokhur-e Sa'd); 1723	Succeeded by Ottoman occupation
