= Heraclius I of Kakheti =

King of Kartli (1688–1703) and Kakheti (1703–1709)

Heraclius I
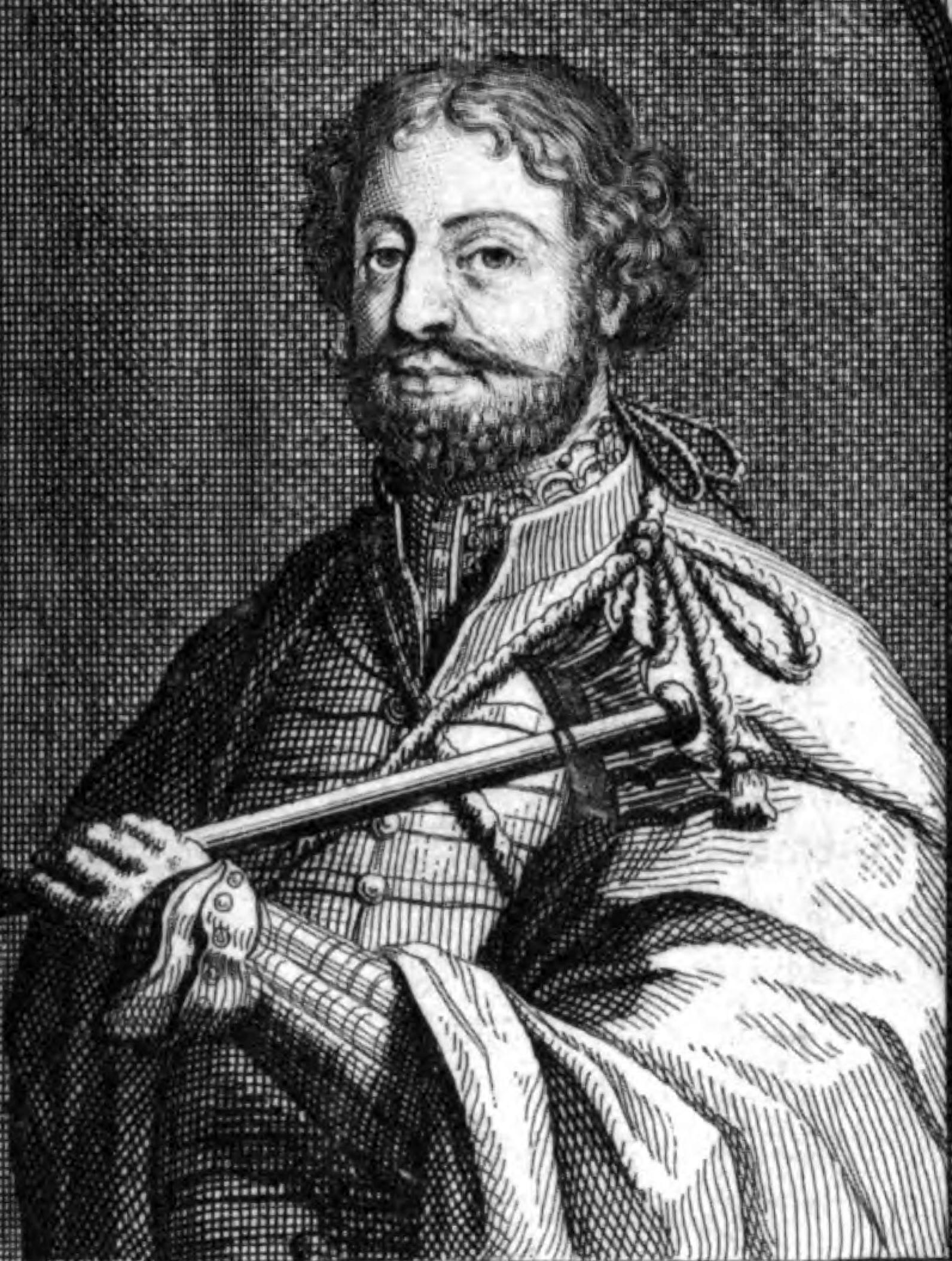
- Engraving by Nicolaes Witsen, 1705

King of Kartli
- Reign: 1688–1703
- Predecessor: George XI
- Successor: George XI

King of Kakheti
- Reign: 1703–1709
- Predecessor: Interregnum
- Successor: David II
- Co-king: David II (1703–1709)
- Born: 1643
- Died: 1709 (aged 66–67); Isfahan, Safavid Iran
- Spouse: Ana Cholokashvili
- Issue Among others: David II of Kakheti; Constantine II of Kakheti (ill.); Helen; Teimuraz II
- Dynasty: Bagrationi
- Father: Prince David of Kakheti
- Mother: Helen Diasamidze
- Religion: Georgian Orthodox Church, then Shia Islam
- Khelrtva

Heraclius I (Georgian: ერეკლე I, romanized: erek'le I), also known as Nazar-Ali Khan (Persian: نظر علی خان, romanized: Naẓar ʿAlī Khān; Georgian: ნაზარალი-ხანი, romanized: nazarali-khani) (1643–1709), of the Bagrationi dynasty, was a Georgian monarch (mepe) who reigned as King of Kartli from 1688 to 1703 and later as King of Kakheti from 1703 to 1709, ruling under the protection of Safavid Iran.

== Early life ==
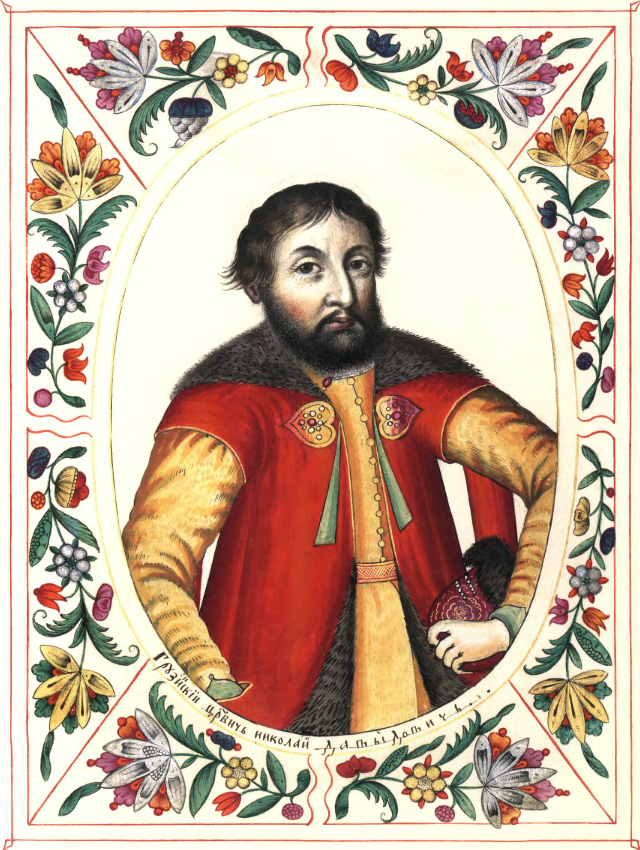
Prince Heraclis (Tsarevich Nikolai Davydovich), Tsarsky titulyarnik, 1672

Born in 1643, he was son of Prince David, son of King Teimuraz I of Kakheti, by his wife, Princess Helen Diasamidze, niece of Catholicos-Patriarch Eudemus I of Georgia. Taken to Russia when the pro-Persian king Rostom of Kartli defeated Teimuraz in 1648, he was raised and educated at the Romanov court at Moscow where he was known as Tsarevich Nicholas Davidovich (Russian: Царевич Николай Давыдович). In 1662, he returned to take over the then-vacant crown of Kakheti at the invitation of local nobility, but was defeated by the rival prince Archil II who enjoyed Iranian support.

Nicholas had to flee back to Russia where he featured prominently and was best man of Tsar Alexis Mikhailovich in his wedding to Natalia Naryshkina in 1671 and stood in high favor with the Russian court.

It is believed by some that he was a natural father of Peter the Great. The writer Aleksey Nikolayevich Tolstoy researching the biography of Peter the Great, informed the Georgian-born Joseph Stalin that he had unearthed some documents which suggested Peter's father was a Georgian king. He thought he would ingratiate himself with Stalin by telling him this. Instead Stalin was appalled and forbade Tolstoy to mention the matter ever again.

== Royal career ==
=== In Kakheti ===
In 1675, Archil conflicted with the shah's government, abandoned Kakheti and defected to the Ottoman Empire. Prince Nicholas capitalized on the ensuing turmoil, returned for a second time and was proclaimed as King of Kakheti Heraclius (Erekle) I. Earlier, in 1666, shah Suleiman I had succeeded Abbas II on the Iranian Safavid throne. In 1674, Suleiman I asked him to decisively end his stay in Russia, ordered him to Isfahan and promised to confirm him as king if Heraclius apostatized to Islam. The king refused to become Muslim and the shah's subject, citing the oath of allegiance given by his ancestor, Alexander II of Kakheti (r. 1574–1605), to Feodor I of Russia. Hence, he was deprived of the crown, being allowed, however, to settle to Isfahan. Kakheti was subsequently under direct Safavid rule.

=== In Kartli ===
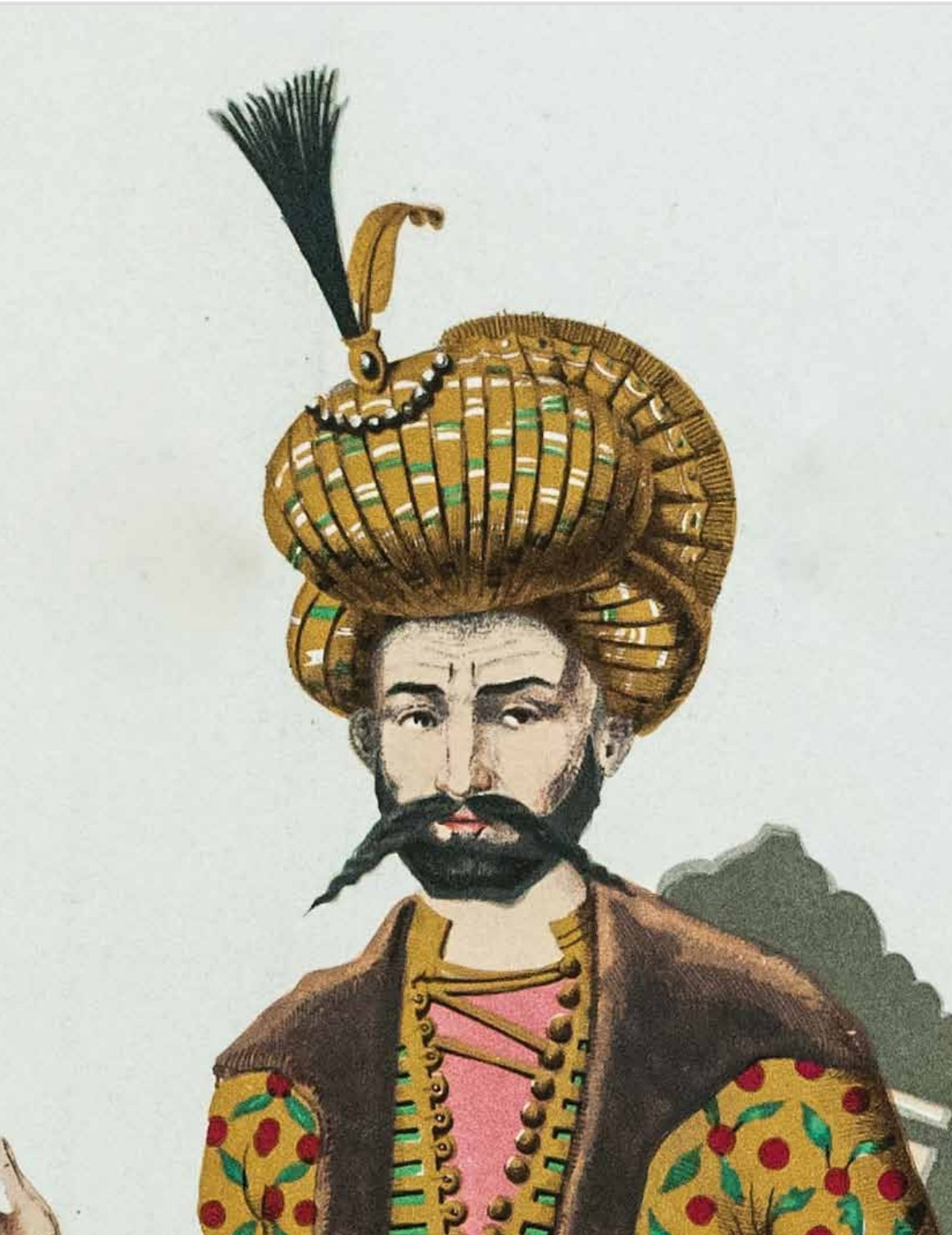
Portrait of Heraclius I, 1708 miniature.

In 1688, when the government of Iran declared its recalcitrant subject George XI of Kartli deposed, Heraclius acceded to the shah's pressure. He converted to Islam assuming the title of Nazar Alī Khān in 1676. In reward, Heraclius was confirmed as King of Kartli and given a Persian army to win over the crown. To buttress Heraclius's authority, the shah appointed 'Abbās-qolī Khan, formerly a beglarbeg of Ganja, as Persian viceroy in Kakheti (residing at Qara-Agach). The khan failed, however, to prevent George XI from staging a comeback in 1691 and blockading Heraclius (Nazar Alī Khān) in Tiflis, his capital. It was not until 1696 that George admitted defeat and came to Isfahan to offer his submission to the new shah, Soltan Hosayn.

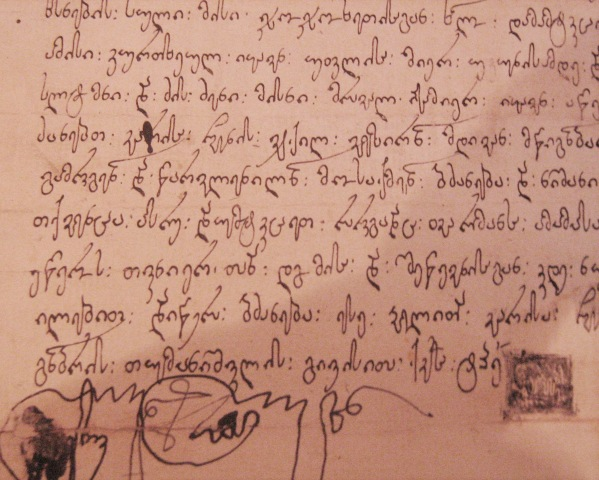
Royal charter of Heraclius I.

At the same time, the shah grew increasingly dissatisfied with Nazar Alī Khān's administration. Having spent most of his life in Russia and Iran, his lack of knowledge of Georgian national traditions he had already estranged his subjects. A vacillating ruler, addicted to strong drink, though capable at times of being brave, philanthropic and reformist, he never really achieved a firm control of his possessions, or made himself popular with the populace of Kakheti. Meanwhile, George XI managed to gain the favor of Shah Hosayn and was reconfirmed as King of Kartli in 1703, while Nazar Alī Khān was removed from the throne and ordered to Isfahan where he was invested by Hosayn as King of Kakheti and appointed the commander of the shah's personal guard. He was never able to return to his kingdom, however, and died at the Persian capital in 1709, being succeeded on the throne by his son, David II (Imām Qulī Khān), who had run Kakheti during Nazar Alī Khān's absence at Isfahan.

== Family ==
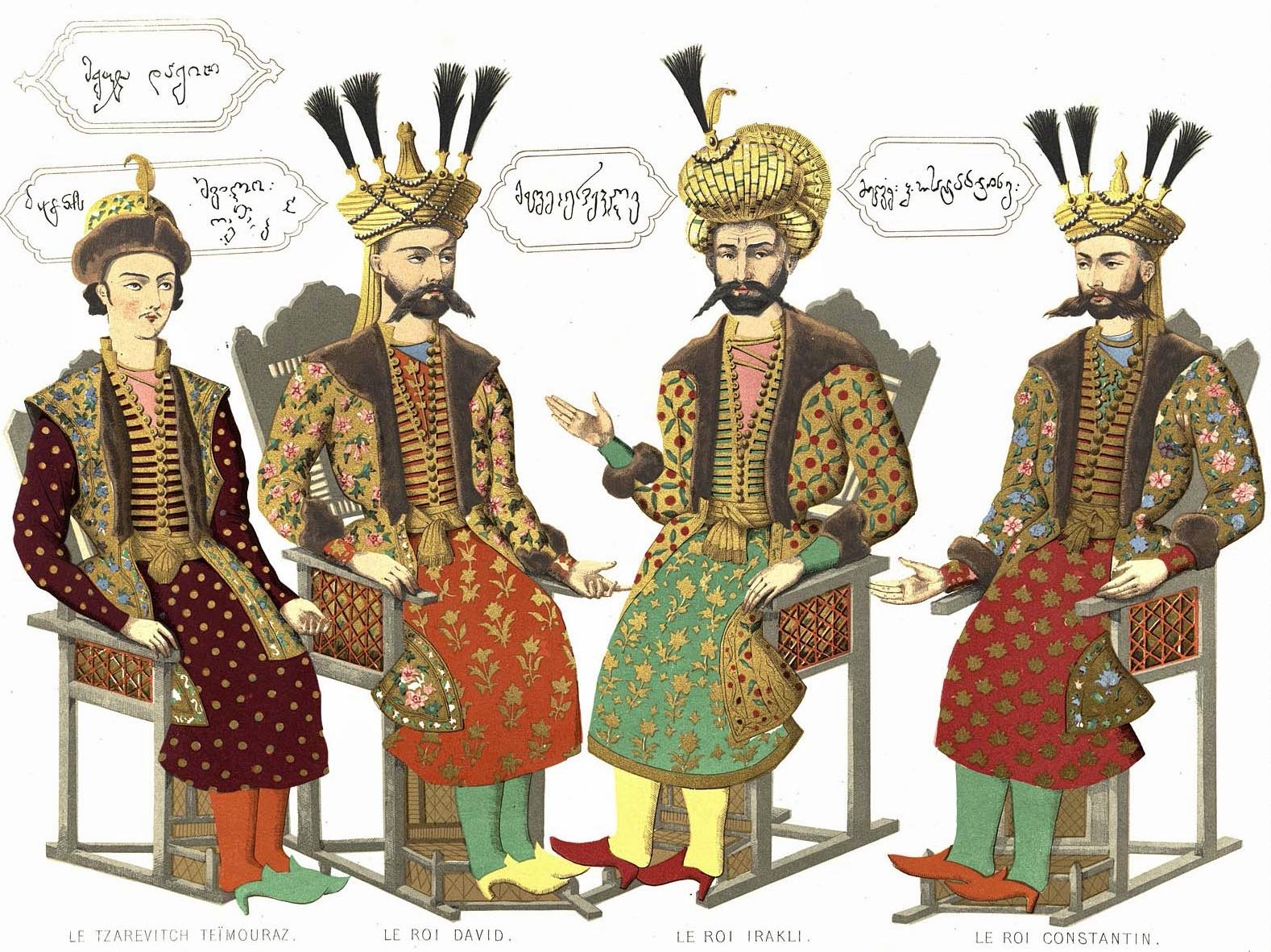
Teimuraz II, David II of Kakheti, Heraclius I of Kakheti, Constantine II of Kakheti.

Heraclius was married to Ana, daughter of Prince Shermazan Cholokashvili. Their children were:

- David II of Kakheti (Imam-Quli Khan) (1678–1722), King of Kakheti (r. 1703–1722);
- Princess Helen (1687–1750), who married Jesse of Kartli;
- Teimuraz II (1695–1762), King of Kakheti (r. 1732–1744) and Kartli (r. 1744–1762);
- Princess Mariam (1696/1698–1744), who married Prince Edisher Cholokashvili, after being widowed, became a nun under the name Makrine; she was a hymnist and copyist of religious texts;
- Princess Ketevan (died 1718), who married Prince Abel Andronikashvili;
- Prince George (fl. 1696–1698);
- Prince Gurgaslan (fl. 1697).

Heraclius also had several illegitimate children by concubines, including:

- Constantine II of Kakheti (Mahmad-Quli Khan) (died 1732), King of Kakheti (r. 1722–1732);
- Prince Anton (fl. 1690);
- Prince Riza-Quli-Mirza (fl. 1714–1722);
- Prince Mustafa-Mirza (fl. 1714–1720);
- Prince Demetrius (fl. 1688–1701);
- Prince Islam-Mirza (fl. 1688–1701);
- Prince Heraclius (23 June 1695 – 10 September 1757);
- Prince Vakhtang (fl. 1695);
- Prince Rostom (fl. 1693);
- Princess Khoreshan (died 1756), who married Garsevan, son of Prince Kaikhosro Cholokashvili;
- Prince David-Mirza;
- Princess Ketevan-Begum (fl. 1742–1752), who married Abdullah Beg of Kartli.

== Ancestry ==
Ancestors of Heraclius I of Kakheti

8. David I of Kakheti
4. Teimuraz I
9. Ketevan the Martyr
2. Prince David of Kakheti
10. George X
5. Khoreshan of Kartli
11. Tamar Lipartiani
1. Heraclius I
6. Levan Diasamidze
3. Helen Diasamidze

== Sources ==
- Lang, David Marshall (1957). The Last Years of Georgian Monarchy. New York: Columbia University Press.
- Mikaberidze, Alexander (ed., 2007). Erekle I. Dictionary of Georgian National Biography. Accessed October 9, 2007.
- Rayfield, Donald (2013). Edge of Empires: A History of Georgia. Reaktion Books. ISBN 978-1-78023-070-2.
- Toumanoff, Cyril (1976). Manuel de Généalogie et de Chronologie pour l'histoire de la Caucasie chrétienne (Arménie, Géorgie, Albanie) [Manual of Genealogy and Chronology of Christian Caucasian History (Armenia, Georgia, Albania)] (in French). Rome: Edizioni Aquila.
- Lordkipanidze, Mariam; Metreveli, Roin (2000). Sakʻartʻvelos mepʻeebi (in Georgian). Tbilisi: Nekeri. ISBN 9992858362.

Preceded by George XI	King of Kartli; 1688–1703	Succeeded by George XI
Preceded by Interregnum	King of Kakheti; 1703–1709	Succeeded by David II
