= Teimuraz II =

King of Kakheti (1732–1744) and Kartli (1744–1762)

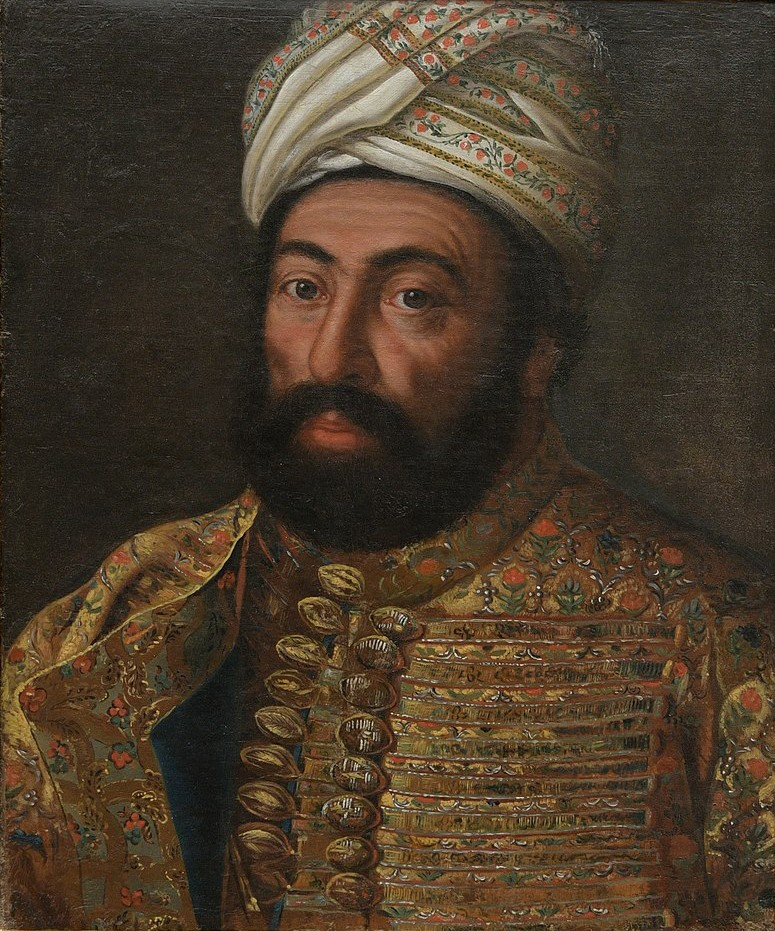
- Portrait by Aleksey Antropov

King of Kartli
- Reign: 1744–1762
- Predecessor: Interregnum
- Successor: Heraclius II

King of Kakheti
- Reign: 1732–1744
- Predecessor: Constantine II
- Successor: Heraclius II
- Co-king: Alexander III (1735–1738)

Regent of Kakheti
- Regency: 1709–1715
- Monarch: David II
- Born: 1695; Tbilisi, Kingdom of Kartli
- Died: 8 January 1762 (aged 66–67); Saint Petersburg, Russian Empire
- Burial: Ascension Cathedral in the Astrakhan Kremlin, Astrakhan, Russian Empire
- Spouse: Unnamed daughter of Baadur of Aragvi (div. 1711) Tamar of Kartli (m. 1712; died 1746) Ana-Khanum Baratashvili (m. 1746)
- Issue Among others: Heraclius II of Georgia; Princess Ketevan
- Dynasty: Bagrationi
- Father: Heraclius I of Kakheti
- Mother: Ana Cholokashvili
- Religion: Georgian Orthodox Church
- Khelrtva

Teimuraz II (Georgian: თეიმურაზ II; 1695 – 8 January 1762) of the Bagrationi dynasty, was a king (mepe) of Kakheti, eastern Georgia, from 1732 to 1744, then of Kartli from 1744 until his death. Teimuraz was also a lyric poet.

== Biography ==
Born in 1695, he was a son of Heraclius I and his wife, Princess Ana Cholokashvili. Together with his mother, Teimuraz ruled as regent for his absent brother David II (Imam Quli-Khan) from 1709 to 1715. In 1732, the Turks killed the next king and Teimuraz’s other brother, Constantine, and took control of his kingdom. His successor, Teimuraz, fled to the mountains of Pshavi and fought the occupants from there. In July 1735, the resurgent Persian ruler Nader Shah Afshar invaded Kakheti and forced the Turks out of most of eastern Georgia. Nader Shah summoned Teimuraz to his headquarters at Erivan and, upon his refusal to convert to Islam, had him detained. Kakheti was placed under the nominal government of Teimuraz's Muslim nephew Ali Mirza. In October 1735, Teimuraz escaped to the mountains of Kakheti and fomented unrest against the Persian rule, but he was captured by the close of 1736.

During these years, part of Georgian nobles staged a powerful rebellion against the Persian regime. In 1738, the Persian shah had to release Teimuraz to counter the Georgian opposition, and made him governor of Kakheti, while his son Heraclius II campaigned with Nader Shah in his invasion of India. The uprising now turned into a brutal civil war between pro- and anti-Persian factions. Teimuraz, aided by his son Erekle II, was able to crush the rebels led by Givi Amilakhvari (1689–1754). As a reward, the shah abolished, in 1742, a heavy tribute laid upon Kakheti, and helped Teimuraz to subdue autonomous duchies of the Aragvi and the Ksani in 1743 and 1744 respectively. For his service against the Ottomans and an anti-Persian revolt, in 1744, Teimuraz was confirmed by the shah as king of Kartli, and his son Heraclius was given a Kakhetian crown, thus laying the ground for the eventual reunification of these Georgian kingdoms. Most importantly, they were recognised as Christian kings for the first time since 1632. Both monarchs were crowned at the Svetitskhoveli Cathedral at Mtskheta on 1 October 1745.

As their influence grew, Teimuraz and Heraclius quickly withdrew their loyalty to the Persian suzerainty. In response, Nader Shah dispatched 30,000 Persian troops to Georgia and appointed a converted Georgian, Amilakhvari, who had previously opposed Persian rule, to lead the punitive campaign. The shah was, however, murdered in 1747, and his empire became engulf into complete chaos. The rulers of Kartli and Kakheti took advantage of the situation and expelled all Persian garrisons from their kingdoms. From 1749 to 1750, they checked several attempts of Persian pretenders to create their powerbase in the eastern Transcaucasia, and made the neighbouring khanates of Yerevan, Ganja, and Nakhichevan their tributaries. He fought then against the Dagestani clansmen who frequently raided the Georgian marchlands, but without complete success.

Like several previous Georgian rulers, he hoped that the expanding Russian Empire would be the only protector for the Christians of Caucasus against the Ottoman and Persian aggressions. He sent an embassy to Saint Petersburg in 1752, but nothing came of this mission. In 1760, he visited the Russian court himself to gain a support for his project of a Georgian expedition to Persia to put a Russian candidate on the shah’s throne. The Russians were too preoccupied with the Seven Years' War to seriously consider Teimuraz’s idea. He died suddenly in the Russian capital on 8 January 1762 (just a fortnight after Elizabeth of Russia incidentally), and was buried next to his father-in-law Vakhtang VI in the Cathedral of the Assumption, Astrakhan. On his death, Heraclius succeeded as king of Kartli, bringing both eastern Georgian kingdoms into a single state (Kingdom of Kartli-Kakheti).

Although he was constantly at war or on guard, Teimuraz found some time to translate from Persian and compose, virtually on horseback, his own poems and lyrics.

== Reburial ==
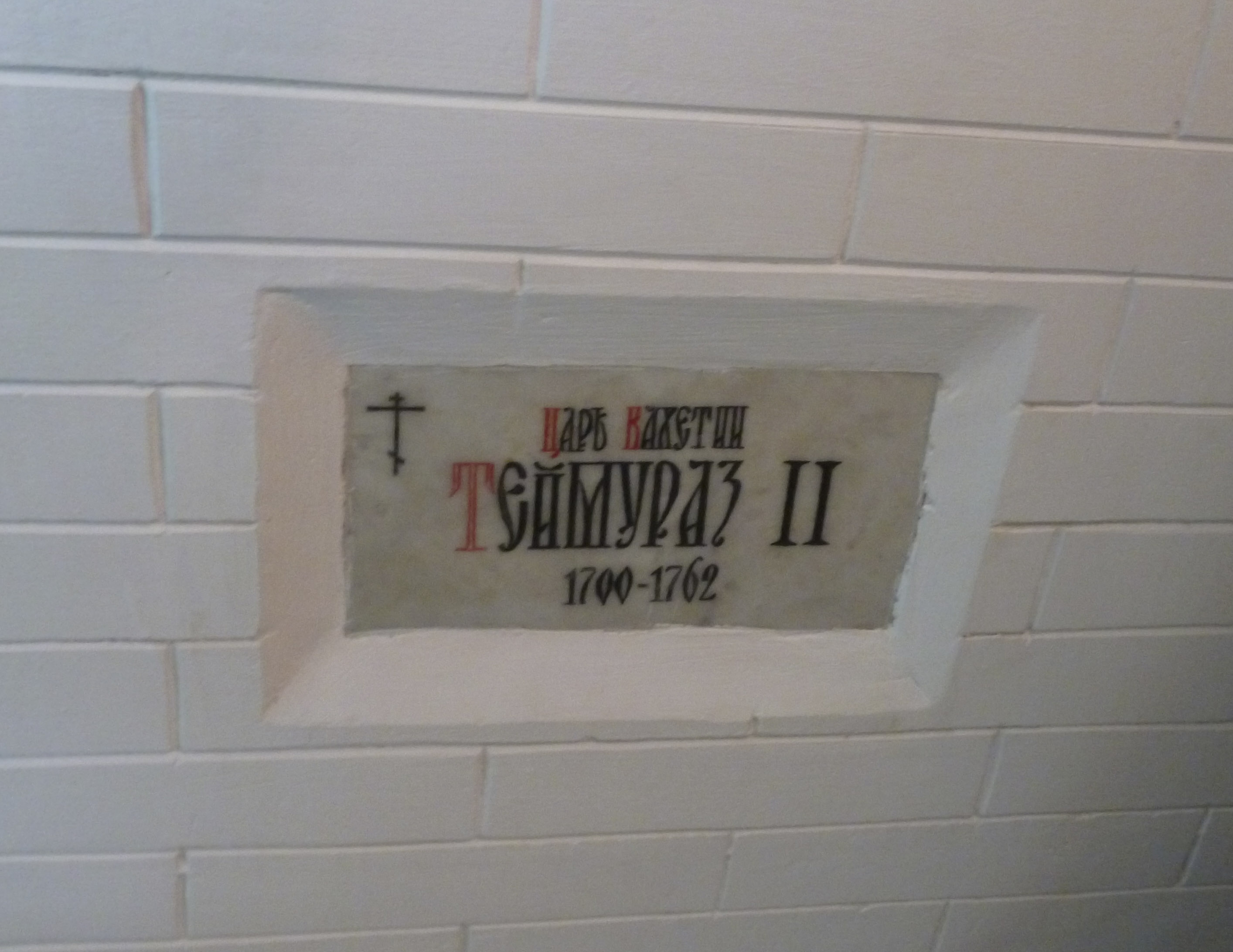
Tomb of King Teimuraz II in Astrakhan.

In July 2013, Georgia raised the possibility to move Teimuraz's remains to Georgia for reburial.

== Family ==
Teimuraz II married three times. His first marriage, to an unnamed daughter (fl. 1711) of Bardzim, Duke of Aragvi, ended in divorce in 1711. His second marriage, on 2 February 1712, was to Tamar (1697–1746), daughter of King Vakhtang VI. His third marriage, on 19 August 1746, was to Ana-Khanum (died 1788), daughter of Prince Bezhan Baratashvili. Their children were:

- Heraclius II of Georgia (1720–1798), by Tamar; King of Kakheti (r. 1744–1762) and Kartli-Kakheti (r. 1762–1798);
- Prince David (fl. 1722–1729), by Tamar;
- Princess Ana (died 4 December 1788), by Tamar; who married firstly Dimitri (died 1776), son of Prince Mamuka Orbeliani, and secondly Ioane (fl. 1724–1781), son of Prince Luarsab Orbeliani;
- Princess Helen, by Tamar; who married Zaza (fl. 1690–1722), son of Prince Parsadan Tsitsishvili;
- Prince Ioane (fl. 1736–1738), by Tamar;
- Princess Khoreshan, by Tamar;
- Princess Ketevan (born 1722), by Tamar; who married Adel Shah, Shah of Iran (r. 1747–1748);
- Prince Solomon (24 May 1747 – 18 July 1749), by Ana-Khanum;
- Prince Vakhtang (born 1748), by Ana-Khanum;
- Princess Tamar (born 1749), by Ana-Khanum;
- Princess Elisabeth (25 March 1750 – 8 May 1770), by Ana-Khanum; who was betrothed to Giorgi, son of Dimitri Amilakhvari. The engagement was dissolved in 1765, after which she married Katsia II Dadiani, Prince of Mingrelia, on 16 November 1765.

== Sources ==
- Hitchins, Keith (1998). "EREKLE II". Encyclopaedia Iranica, Vol. VIII, Fasc. 5. pp. 541–542.
- Suny, Ronald Grigor (1994). The Making of the Georgian Nation. Indiana University Press. ISBN 978-0253209153.
- (in English) Iranian-Georgian Relations in the 16th- 19th Centuries in Encyclopædia Iranica
- Donald Rayfield, The Literature of Georgia: A History (August 16, 2000), Routledge, ISBN 0-7007-1163-5, page 126-7 (about Teimuraz’s poetry)

Regnal titles
Preceded by Constantine II	King of Kakheti; 1732–1744	Succeeded by Heraclius II
Preceded by Persian rule	King of Kartli; 1744–1762 with Tamar of Kartli (1744–1746)	Succeeded by Heraclius II
