= Zakaria Tsitsishvili =

Georgian statesman

Sakhltukhutsesi of Kakheti
- Reign: 1776—1778
- Predecessor: David of Ksani (1774)
- Successor: David Orbeliani (1768—1784)
- Died: Before 1793
- Noble family: Tsitsishvili
- Spouse: Makrine of Ksani
- Father: Ivane Tsitsishvili

Zakaria Tsitsishvili (Georgian: ზაქარია ციციშვილი, ? – before 1793) was a Georgian statesman and military commander. A tavadi (prince), he served as sakhltukhutsesi (1776–1778–?) and amilakhvari (1789) in the Kingdom of Kartli-Kakheti.

== Origins ==
He was the son of Ivane Tsitsishvili, who served as amilakhvari (1746–1748) and sakhltukhutsesi (1756) and was an associate of King Heraclius II of Kakheti. Ivane was killed in 1756 in a battle against the Lezgins near Surami..

His mother was a princess of the Chavchavadze family. Zakaria Tsitsishvili's first cousin was Garsevan Chavchavadze, adjutant general to King Heraclius II.

== Biography ==
Little is known about his early life. Following his father's death, he was deprived of his share of the family's estates and serfs, which was appropriated by Demetre (Meralibeg) Tsitsishvili, the brother of Zakaria's grandfather Kaikhosro.

In 1760, Demetre died. In 1762, King Heraclius II of Kartli and Kakheti initiated an investigation into the legality of the ownership of a share of Kaikhosro's descendants' property by Demetre's son Edisher (Edia).

On 5 May 1766, a court headed by the king ruled that Edisher (Edia) Tsitsishvili was illegitimate (the son of a maidservant) and confiscated his property in favour of Zakaria Tsitsishvili. Among other possessions, Zakaria received the palace built by Demetre in Tbilisi, as well as estates in Kvareli, Aradeti, Ruisi, and Doesi. Georgian historian M. Michitashvili associates the ruling with King Heraclius II's desire to curb the influence of Demetre's descendants, as Demetre had been a close associate of his father, Teimuraz II.

By 1768, Zakaria held the title of mdivanbeg (judge). On 16 June 1776, he is first recorded in the highest government office of sakhltukhutsesi, in connection with a legal dispute with Otar Zedginidze over a serf. In this office, Zakaria succeeded his father-in-law David Kvenipneveli, the Duke of Ksani. He is last recorded as sakhltukhutsesi in a document dated 1778.

Zakaria became involved in a dispute with Sardar of Satsitsiano and Tbilisi Mouravi, David Tsitsishvili, over possession of the Mzovreti fortress in Shida Kartli. In 1783, Zakaria occupied the fortress and installed his own men there. In response, David declared: "The Mzovreti fortress belongs to us, the descendants of Nodar; neither the descendants of Kaikhosro nor Papuna have a share in it." The Sardal formed an alliance with Paata and Nikoloz Tsitsishvili against Zakaria. Zakaria was captured and forced to withdraw his forces from Mzovreti. On 1 April 1783, the royal court ruled in favour of David Tsitsishvili in the dispute.

Relations between Zakaria and representatives of other branches of the Tsitsishvili family (the "descendants of Nodar"), as well as with the Zedginidze family, continued to deteriorate. In 1789, the conflict escalated into open hostilities. By then, Zakaria Tsitsishvili held the office of amilakhvari. According to the testimony of Queen Mariam, Tsitsishvili assembled an army and attacked the settlement of Grakali, which belonged to Prince Yulon, the son of Heraclius II. The prince was victorious and captured many prisoners, while a member of the Zedginidze family was among those killed in the battle. King Heraclius sent an army against Tsitsishvili under the command of his grandson Ioane. In the decisive battle on the Zedavela plain near Gori, Zakaria was defeated and forced to emigrate to Istanbul, where he died no later than 1793 (he is mentioned as deceased in a court document).

A prominent role in suppressing Zakaria's revolt was played by his longtime rival, David Tsitsishvili. In 1790, he received a grant charter from Prince Yulon enumerating his military services:

"You acted according to your office and served with great loyalty. You captured the spies who had been sent against me and brought them to us, and they had caused much devastation in Kartli... Your kinsman Zakaria led 2,500 men into the Ateni valley... We had a small army... We could barely muster 500 men... Because of their numerical superiority, many were reluctant to enter the battle that day... You did not waver, however, and we followed your counsel and advanced to Zedavela... We invoked God and engaged them... The battle lasted three hours and was so fierce that through the smoke of the gunfire one could not distinguish one man from another, and you were like a lion that day; you were struck by a bullet, but there was no greater [fighter] than you among the men... You were the principal cause of the victory."

In 1791, by royal decree, King Heraclius II confiscated all estates and serfs belonging to Zakaria Tsitsishvili's sons. They later succeeded in recovering part of their property, including Kvareli and Doesi.

== Family ==
He was married to Makrine, daughter of David Kvenipneveli, the Duke of Ksani and sakhltukhutsesi of Kartli (1774).

He had four sons: Ivane, David, Zakaria (Zaza), and Elizbar. Three of them—Ivane, Zakaria, and Elizbar—were active participants in the Georgian war for independence of 1812–1813 and close associates of Prince Alexander. Zakaria Tsitsishvili Jr. also served as a diplomat of King Heraclius II.

A direct descendant of Zakaria Tsitsishvili is Ukrainian businessman and philanthropist Oleksandr Petrovskyi.
