= Ivane Tsitsishvili (sakhltukhutsesi) =

Georgian statesman

Ivane (Iovane) Tsitsishvili

Sakhltukhutsesi of Kakheti
- Reign: 1756
- Predecessor: Grigol Cholokashvili (1741—1747)
- Successor: Jesse Jorjadze (1759)
- Died: 1756
- Noble family: Tsitsishvili
- Spouse: ? Chavchavadze
- Father: Kaikhosro Tsitsishvili

Ivane (Iovane) Tsitsishvili (Georgian: იოვანე ციციშვილი; ? – July 1756) was a Georgian statesman and military figure who served as amilakhvari of the Kingdom of Kartli (1746–1748–?) and sakhltukhutsesi of the Kingdom of Kakheti (?–1756).

== Origin ==
He belonged to the "Upper" branch of the princely aristocratic Tsitsishvili family. His father, Kaikhosro Tsitsishvili, was a sakhltukhutsesi (1735–1736), amilakhvari (1736–1746, with interruptions) of the Kingdom of Kartli, and sardar of the feudal principality of Satsitsiano (1732–1746), who died in battle in April 1746.

His mother was Anna, from the princely Baratashvili family. In her second marriage, she became the Queen consort of Kartli as the wife of King Teimuraz II (died 1784).

== Biography ==
=== Struggle for paternal inheritance ===
He was a minor at the time of his father's death. He was raised at the royal court in Tbilisi, while the inheritance of Kaikhosro Tsitsishvili (estates and serfs) was placed under the guardianship of his father's elder brother (Ivane's uncle), Demetre (Merali-beg) Tsitsishvili, who held the posts of kalantar (tax collector) and nazir (head of the royal court) of Kartli.

Ivane inherited the position of amilakhvari (royal master of the horse) from his father; however, the post of sardar (commander of the Royal Sadrosho and ruler of the principality of Satsitsiano) was given to a representative of another branch of the family, Aleksandre Tsitsishvili, son of Nodar. In 1747, the suzerain of the Kingdom of Kartli, Nader Shah, confirmed Ivane in the office of amilakhvari, as later testified by Ivane's son Zakaria:

"When the sovereign arrived in Borchalo, my father was presented to him and it was reported: 'His father died in your service; now he holds his father's post, and we beg your mercy—assign him a salary of fifty tomans.' The sovereign replied: 'He is still a youth, twenty-five tomans will be enough for him.' "

However, Ivane's uncle Demetre embezzled this salary. In 1748, Ivane Tsitsishvili featured in a property division decision between branches of the Tsitsishvili family, which was issued by Sardar Aleksandre Tsitsishvili on the orders of King Heraclius II of Kakheti. In particular, an estate in Kvareli was divided between Ivane and Demetre.

At the same time, Queen Anna issued an order dividing the income from the domain of the deceased Kaikhosro Tsitsishvili into three parts, assigning two-thirds to Demetre and one-third to Ivane. In exchange, Demetre was expected to perform military service in place of his nephew. In 1766, the Queen revoked her order due to Demetre's abuses:

"But he (Demetre) did not serve on campaigns at all—it was Iovane who was constantly at court, went on military campaigns, and joined the royal hunts. However, this document was granted neither by the king nor by any judge—it was issued by me, and I myself revoke it. I acted wrongly: I wanted him (Demetre) to be a helper and servant to my son, not his heir and rival".

=== Death ===
He became part of the inner circle of King Heraclius II of Kakheti. By 1756, he served as the royal sakhltukhutsesi.

In 1756, the Leks (Lezgins) launched a series of raids into Kartli, particularly targeting the principality of Satsitsiano. In the spring, they captured the fortress of Givi Tsitsishvili in Zemo Nichbisi, plundering property and taking the prince's wife, children, and cousin captive. King Heraclius II, leading a united Kartli-Kakheti army, caught up with and defeated the raiders in Chari.

However, a new large-scale raid took place in the summer when 3,000 Lezgin cavalry invaded Kartli. They captured and plundered Karaleti, another Tsitsishvili estate. The royal army overtook the enemy near the abandoned village of Skra. In a series of engagements, the Leks were defeated and forced to retreat. However, during the battle near Surami, sakhltukhutsesi Ivane Tsitsishvili was killed:

"Iovane was our pupil... he remained constantly at our side. At that time, lawless Leks ruled over Sakartvelo... we clashed [with them] near Surami, Iovane bravely went forward... we won that day, but he was killed right before my eyes".

== Descendants ==
He was married to a princess of the Chavchavadze family. Ivane's son, Zakaria Tsitsishvili, served as sakhltukhutsesi to King Heraclius II (?–1776–1778–?). He continued the struggle over the ancestral inheritance against Demetre Tsitsishvili and his descendants. He emigrated to the Ottoman Empire after being defeated in a feudal conflict in 1789.

A direct descendant of Ivane Tsitsishvili is the Ukrainian businessman and philanthropist Oleksandr Petrovskyi.
