= Edisher Tsitsishvili =

Georgian statesman

Sakhltukhutsesi of Kartli
- Reign: 1695, 1717–1722
- Predecessor: Kaikhosro Tsitsishvili (Lopina) (1688—1703); Datuna, Duke of Ksani (?—1717)
- Successor: Kaikhosro Tsitsishvili (Lopina) (1688—1703); Vakhtang Zedginidze (1722—1723)
- Died: Before 1728
- Noble family: Tsitsishvili
- Father: Kaikhosro Tsitsishvili (Lopina)

Edisher Tsitsishvili (Georgian: ედიშერ ციციშვილი; died before 1728) was a Georgian statesman, military leader, and diplomat from the noble House of Tsitsishvili who served as sakhltukhutsesi of the Kingdom of Kartli (1695, 1717–1722) and vakil (governor) of Kartli for the Iranian Shah Soltan Hoseyn (1717–1722)

== Biography ==
Edisher Tsitsishvili belonged to the "Upper" branch of the Tsitsishvili family. He was the son of Kaikhosro "Lopina" Tsitsishvili, a prominent sakhltukhutsesi and close associate of King Heraclius I (Nazar-Ali Khan) between 1688 and 1703.

Like many sons of the Kartlian nobility during this era, he likely spent part of his youth as an amanat (hostage) at the Safavid royal court in Isfahan, as the kingdoms of Kartli and Kakheti were vassals of the Safavid Empire. Consequently, Tsitsishvili built strong diplomatic connections in Iran and enjoyed the trust of the Shahs.

In 1695, he was appointed sakhltukhutsesi to King Erekle I for the first time, coinciding with the king's political rapprochement with Iran. He either succeeded his father Kaikhosro or held the title jointly with him while carrying out various diplomatic missions for the crown.

Between 1701 and 1703, he was involved in dividing the feudal estates of the deceased sardar Papuna of the "Lower" Tsitsishvili branch and his sons, Zaal and Zaza, with his relative Papuna Tsitsishvili.

In 1716, Tsitsishvili negotiated at the Safavid court for the appointment of Bakar as King of Kartli to replace his uncle Jesse (Ali-Quli Khan), whose rule was marked by severe persecutions of local Christians. The diplomatic mission was highly successful. In 1717, Shah Soltan Hoseyn appointed Edisher Tsitsishvili as the vakil (governor/viceroy) of Kartli, issuing a decree stating:

"He demonstrated sincere devotion and commendable conduct. One of his most notable merits was taking upon himself the delivery of the glorious crown (tadj)... as well as rich robes of honor (khalats) presented to the King. Through these praiseworthy deeds, he gained favor and was admitted into the circle of persons close to us... As a reward for such service, we have honored him, exalted him, and granted him a high honorary position at our court as vakil of Kartli, as well as the title of head of the Tsitsishvili house."

In recognition of these services, Prince Bakar awarded Edisher hereditary ownership of the village of Karaleti in Shida Kartli, including all its legal boundaries—mountains, plains, fields, vineyards, waters, mills, arable and uncultivated lands, forests, and hunting grounds.

Bakar appointed Tsitsishvili as his sakhltukhutsesi, removing Datuna, Duke of Ksani, from office. Datuna launched a rebellion, which was subsequently suppressed by Bakar's brother, Vakhushti.

In 1719, Vakhtang VI ascended the throne in Tbilisi. Relying on an alliance with Tsar Peter the Great of Russia, Vakhtang sought to break away from Iranian suzerainty. Although Edisher Tsitsishvili aligned with the opposition to the king, he retained his administrative post as sakhltukhutsesi, as recorded in the 1721 census.

Between 1722 and 1723, political instability forced Edisher to flee to Kakheti alongside his sons Kaikhosro, David, and Elizbar. There, he entered the service of King Constantine II (Mahmad-Quli Khan) and quickly became one of his principal advisors. In 1723, he headed an embassy to Iran to request military aid against Vakhtang. When Constantine took the throne of Kartli as Constantine III, he rewarded Edisher, declaring:

"In the lands of the Qizilbash, you served us in many affairs, and when the sovereign [Shah] granted us our hereditary Kartli, it greatly pleased us, and before all men we loved you above others. Now you have become a person whom we trust."

Edisher Tsitsishvili died before 1728 (in the Ottoman defter (census), his son Kaikhosro is recorded as the head of the family).

== Family ==
Edisher Tsitsishvili had at least seven sons:

- Nodar Tsitsishvili – Mentioned in the 1717 charter granting Edisher the estate of Karaleti.
- Demetre (Merali-beg) Tsitsishvili – Raised at the Safavid court in Isfahan as an amanat. He later served as the Amilakhvari (Lord High Horse) of Kartli (1735–1742), and was later appointed kalantar (tax collector) and nazir (court supervisor) of Kartli.
- Kaikhosro Tsitsishvili (died 1746) – Sardar of Satsitsiano (1732–1746), sakhltukhutsesi of Kartli (1735–1736), and Amilakhvari (1736–1742).
- David Tsitsishvili
- Elizbar Tsitsishvili
- Parsadan Tsitsishvili — Mdibani-beg (judge and high official).
- Teimuraz Tsitsishvili — Mdibani-beg (judge and high official).

In 1736, an unnamed daughter of Edisher was married by her brothers to Ibrahim Khan, the Iranian sepahsalar (commander-in-chief of the army).

Ukrainian businessman and philanthropist Oleksandr Petrovskyi is a direct descendant of Edisher Tsitsishvili.
