= Gamrekeli Toreli =

- Duke of Akhalkalaki
- Reign: 1170's – 1190/1
- Predecessor: Kakha Toreli
- Successor: Kakha II Toreli
- Noble family: House of Toreli

Gamrekeli Toreli or Gamrekeli of Tori (Georgian: გამრეკელი თორელი) was a 12th-century Georgian noble (didebuli) and duke (eristavi) of Akhalkalakhi and Tori.

== Biography ==
Gamrekeli, son of Kakha, along with his father, supported the rebellion of Prince Demna and the Orbeli family in 1177, however they soon sided with king George III of Georgia and fought for the monarchy against the insurgents. The uprising was suppressed, and King George III elevated the Toreli family. After the failed revolt led by Qutlu Arslan, Queen Tamar elevated Gamrekeli to the office of Mejinibetukhutsesi (High Constable) and granted him possessions over Tori (which was deprived of from Apridon). He became amirspasalar after the death of Sargis Mkhargrdzeli. Toreli as an Eristavi of Akhalkalakhi was securing Georgia's southern frontier borders. In 1186-1187, He led Georgian forces against Seljuqid rulers, and repelled them from countries known by the names of Palakitzio and Dzagin ravine, bringing to the sovereign rich booty as a gift. During the revolt of Queen Tamar's disgraced husband, George the Rus', around 1191, Gamrekeli Toreli was one of the few nobles who remained loyal to the Queen. The force sent to Javakheti was commanded by him, jointly with the brothers Mkhargrdzeli. When the amirspasalar Gamrekeli Toreli died "everybody grieved for him"; in consequence, his heirs lost only Tmogvi. The post of amirspasalar was given to Zakaria Mkhargrdzeli.
