= George, Duke of Aragvi =

George (Georgian: გიორგი არაგვის ერისთავი, romanized: giorgi aragvis eristavi; died 1723), was a Georgian duke (eristavi) of the Duchy of Aragvi from 1688 to 1696 and again from 1703 to 1723.

== Biography ==
George was the son of Otar, Duke of Aragvi. In 1688, he sided with Heraclius I in the struggle against George XI. In response, George XI invaded the Duchy of Aragvi, capturing and burning Dusheti and its surrounding areas. However, his forces suffered heavy losses and were forced to withdraw from the region.

In 1691, George aligned himself with George XI, prompting Heraclius I to ravage the Duchy of Aragvi. In 1695, Heraclius, supported by an Iranian army, defeated George XI and George. The latter fled first to Imereti and then to Dvaleti, where he was captured by his own vassals and handed over to Heraclius. Heraclius sent him to Iran in 1695, where he remained until 1703. Through the intercession of George XI, who was also in Iran, George returned to Georgia and was reinstated as Duke of Aragvi.

For a time, George remained loyal to Vakhtang VI, but as Vakhtang's authority grew, he turned against him. Together with Datuna, Duke of Ksani, he petitioned the Shah to depose Vakhtang and appoint Jesse as king. He later reconciled with Vakhtang. However, in 1723, when Constantine II of Kakheti captured and sacked Tbilisi, George defected and sided with Constantine. Consequently, Bakar seized George, his own father-in-law, and had him beheaded.

== Family ==
George was married to Darejan (Tamar) (died 1737), daughter of Prince Tamaz Orbeliani. They had the following children:

- Otar (Lopina) (died 1739), Duke of Aragvi (r. 1723–1727), who went to Russia in 1724;
- Bardzim (died 1739), Duke of Aragvi (r. 1731–1737), who was killed by Shanshe II, Duke of Ksani;
- Revaz (Romanoz) (died 30 January 1753), Archbishop in Russia;
- Utrut (fl. 1732–1736);
- Givi (fl. 1732–1736);
- Vakhushti (fl. 1732–1736);
- Ioane (fl. 1735);
- Abel (died 1737);
- Tinatin (fl. 1701), who married Vakhtang, son of Prince Nodar Tsitsishvili;
- Ana (1706 – 18 February 1780), who married Bakar of Kartli;
- An unnamed daughter, who married Toma, son of Prince Paata Andronikashvili.
