= Satavado =

Satavado (Georgian: სათავადო), same as county, was a large feudal landholder and feudal hierarchy-political unit in the 15th-18th centuries in Georgia. Satavados were established in times of political and economical overthrow of Georgian Kingdom, by exploitation peasants and grooving immunity of feudal lords when they formed a new class of Tavadi (prince) / (duke) (Georgian: თავადი). The Tavadi were one of the highest ranks of Georgian nobility, second only to the Royal Families of Georgia (the various branches of the Bagrationi dynasty). The title of Tavadi is equivalent to the European titles of prince and duke. There are various ranks of princes in Georgian history. Other ranks include Mtavari and Eristavi

The long period of domination of foreign intruders extremely weakened the central political and economic power, which became the main reason for rising of Satavados. The regions lost economical interrelations. The feudal anarchy grew in the country. Weak monarch could not employ his main function – keep his villains in humility and safe feudal order in country.

Satavados were created by union of feudal families (union by oath). Big feudal lords, unified in Satavado. captured former King's territories or were granted with the power to manage the territories. (Saeristavo, Satsikhistavo, etc.). The Aznauri (nobleman) obeyed to and served the Tavadi (prince) / (duke) by following their every order of diplomatic, secretarial and military nature. The Tavadi created their own government offices independently from the King. (Maidservants, regular army etc.) and confronted with the central government system, Royalty system. Some Tavadi where also members of the Royal Families of Georgia themselves.

When Georgia was united (11th-13th centuries) the country became strong economically and socially, Royal role was mighty and ground and such feudal institutes existed in a more unified state as well, with the feudal rulers having the title of Eristavi instead. Many Tavadi begin their rule as replacement for dead dynasties of Eristavi. Part of Satavado was created on the basis of Saeristavo. (Such as Ksani, Aragvi, Racha and others). The title of Eristavi however saw a revival after a few centuries, with several conflicts of newly proclaimed and/or self proclaimed Eristavi waging war against Tavadi dynasties over the right to rule. This led to an alternating of rulers between the Eristavi and the Tavadi. Eventually, many Eristavi turned their title into a last name, changing their previous ones. The Tavadi however did not do such a thing, instead they kept their last names intact, and continued to rule many of the lands they owned. Castles and manorial estates were created by the Tavadi through the long period of their history. They included granted, awarded, dowry and ravished manors. At the height of the Tavadi period, some families had, within their own territory, outgrown in power and influence some of the branches of the Royal Family, but still, many Tavadi, although de facto completely independent, chose to remain loyal to the various branches of the Bagrationi Royal Family, often working with them side by side, as counsellors and ambassadors.

Both the Tavadi, the Eristavi and the Mtavari kept their noble rights and registered them abroad as well, along with the Royal branches of the Bagrationi dynasty, especially in Russian books of nobility such as the "Velvet Book", reserved to only the highest ranks of Georgian nobility, the Russian Imperial List of Princely Families of Georgia and Imereti, and the various armorial registers.

The history of the Tavadi and the Eristavi is taught to this day in Georgian history books, with the desceandants of Georgian nobility trying to preserve it as much as possible both in Georgia and abroad, as a sign of cultural inheritance and as a way to honour their ancestors. Many Tavadi and Eristavi moved to Europe and married foreign nobles and royals.

In Satavado three kind of land hold forms existed:

- Common or cooperative (Georgian: საერთო)
- Prince property (Georgian: საუფლისწულო)
- Individually owned (Georgian: სათავისთაო)

“Common“ (Georgian: საერთო) - was a manor which was used commonly by the families belonging to the same Satavado. The minor was managed by Tavadi appointed by the heads of other families too. They were paying “State taxes” and the rest of the income was divided by the families. Tavadi was getting twice as big divvy than other families.

“Prince property” (Georgian: საუფლისწულო) – was granted to a feudal family to manage it for some time. After some period that minor could have been given to another family. Interim owned of the ”Prince property” could not sell or change anything in serf-feudal obligations. (Disembarrass or change gilds). Such kind of changes could have been made only by Prince's agreement.

“Individually owned” (Georgian: სათავისთაო) - manors were most progressive type of land hold. It vas individually owned by only one family, which was inherited or was granted for good service to the King or dowered. Individually owned lands were unconditional properties. Owner could sell, give in dowry or do something else with his property. This kind of ownership supported the development of intensive agriculture. Exploitation of servants was more restrained than in “Common“ or “Prince property” manors.

Aznauri (Nobleman) were divided according to the type of Satavado they belong. They were: “Common“ (Georgian: საერთო), “Prince property” (Georgian: საუფლისწულო) or “Individually owned” (Georgian: სათავისთაო) subordinated. They were getting manors with servants from Tavadi. This land hold relations was the bases for feudal-hierarchy.

The mane Satavado in Kartli were: Ksani's, Aragvi's, Samukhranbatono, Saamilakhvro, Satsitsiano, Sabaratiano. In Imereti – Mkheidzeta, Chkheidzeta, Mikheladzeta, Rachis Eristavta, Abashidzeta, Tseretelta. In Guria – Machutadzeta and Guriis eristavta. In Odishi – Chiladzeta, Goshadzeta, Djaianta, Chichuata, Chikvnta and others. (Many of them were named after the families which owned them)

Satavados system disunited feudal Georgia and made reunion of the country impossible. It facilitated influence of intruders and helped them to keep authority, therefore they supported Satavados. The Satavados were abolished in the 19th century when Georgia was fully occupied by the Russian Empire. There were no more social-economical reasons for their existence. Satavados were divided among different private minors.
