= Baadur II, Duke of Aragvi =

Baadur II (Georgian: ბაინდურ არაგვის ერისთავი) was a Georgian duke (eristavi) of the Duchy of Aragvi from 1696 to 1703. He was the son of Revaz, Duke of Aragvi.

In 1696, King Heraclius I appointed Baadur as duke after deposing George, Duke of Aragvi. Around 1703, George returned from captivity in Iran through the intercession of King George XI and was reinstated as Duke of Aragvi, resulting in Baadur's removal from office.
