= Duchy of Akhalkalaki =

Duchy of the Kingdom of Georgia (10th c. –14th c.)

Duchy of Akhalkalaki ახალქალაქის საერისთავო
- Duchy of the Kingdom of Georgia
- 10th–14th century
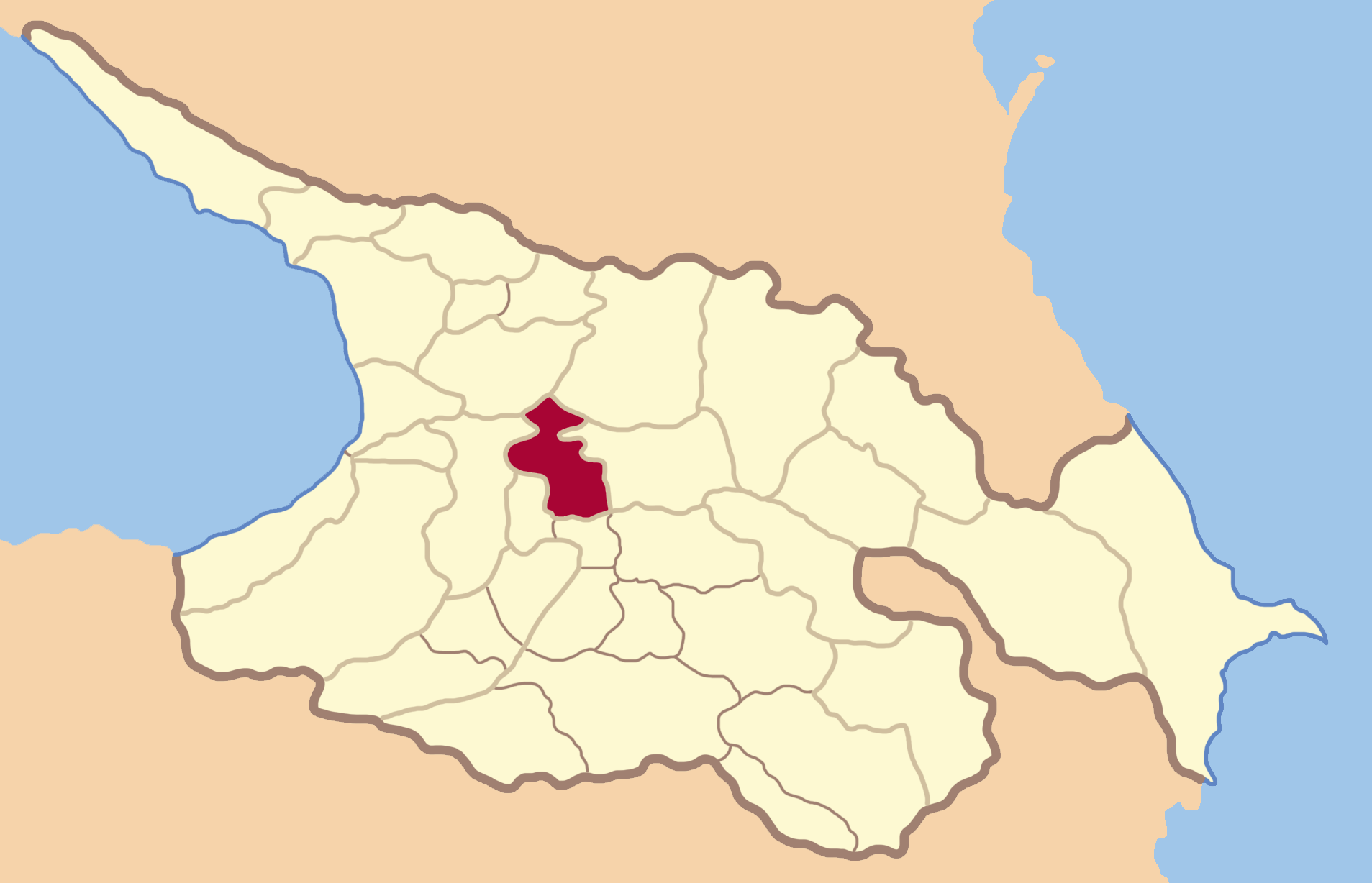
- Location in contemporary Georgia
- Capital: Akhalkalaki
- Area
  - Coordinates: 41°24′20″N 43°29′10″E
- Historical era: Middle Ages
  - Established: 10th century
  - Disestablished: 14th century
Succeeded by
Principality of Samtskhe
- Today part of: Georgia

The Duchy of Akhalkalaki (Georgian: ახალქალაქის საერისთავო, referred as the Duchy of Javakheti) was a duchy (saeristavo) in medieval Georgia. Duchy was created by King Leon III of Abkhazia (957–967).

== History ==
It was first mentioned on the inscriptions in Kumurdo Cathedral. Until 1021, the Dukes of Javakheti were members of Marushiani family. It passed to the Tmogveli and then the Toreli family. From the 12th to 13th centuries, the Toreli family also owned estates in Tori, Lesser and Inner Kartli. Pressured by the princes of Samtskhe of the Jaqeli dynasty in the 14th century, the Torelis were forced to move to Shida Kartli and the duchy was absorbed into Principality of Samtskhe.

== Rulers ==
- Zuiai (~964)
- Vache (960 – 70's)
- Zviad (10–11th century)
- Pharsman Tmogveli (1023–1065)
- Varazbakur Toreli (1065 – ?)
- Kakha Toreli (1152)
- Gamrekeli Toreli (1170's – 1191)
- Kakha II Toreli (1191 – ?)
- Shalva Toreli-Akhaltiskheli (? – 1226)
- Gamrekeli III Toreli (1225 – ?)
- Kakha III Toreli (1250 – 70's)
- Gamrekel Ghobiari (13th century)

== See also ==
- Duchy of Tskhumi
- Duchy of Racha
