= Satsitsiano =

Feudal principality in Georgia (country)

Satsitsiano საციციანო
- 1467–1801
- Coat of arms of The House of Tsitsishvili

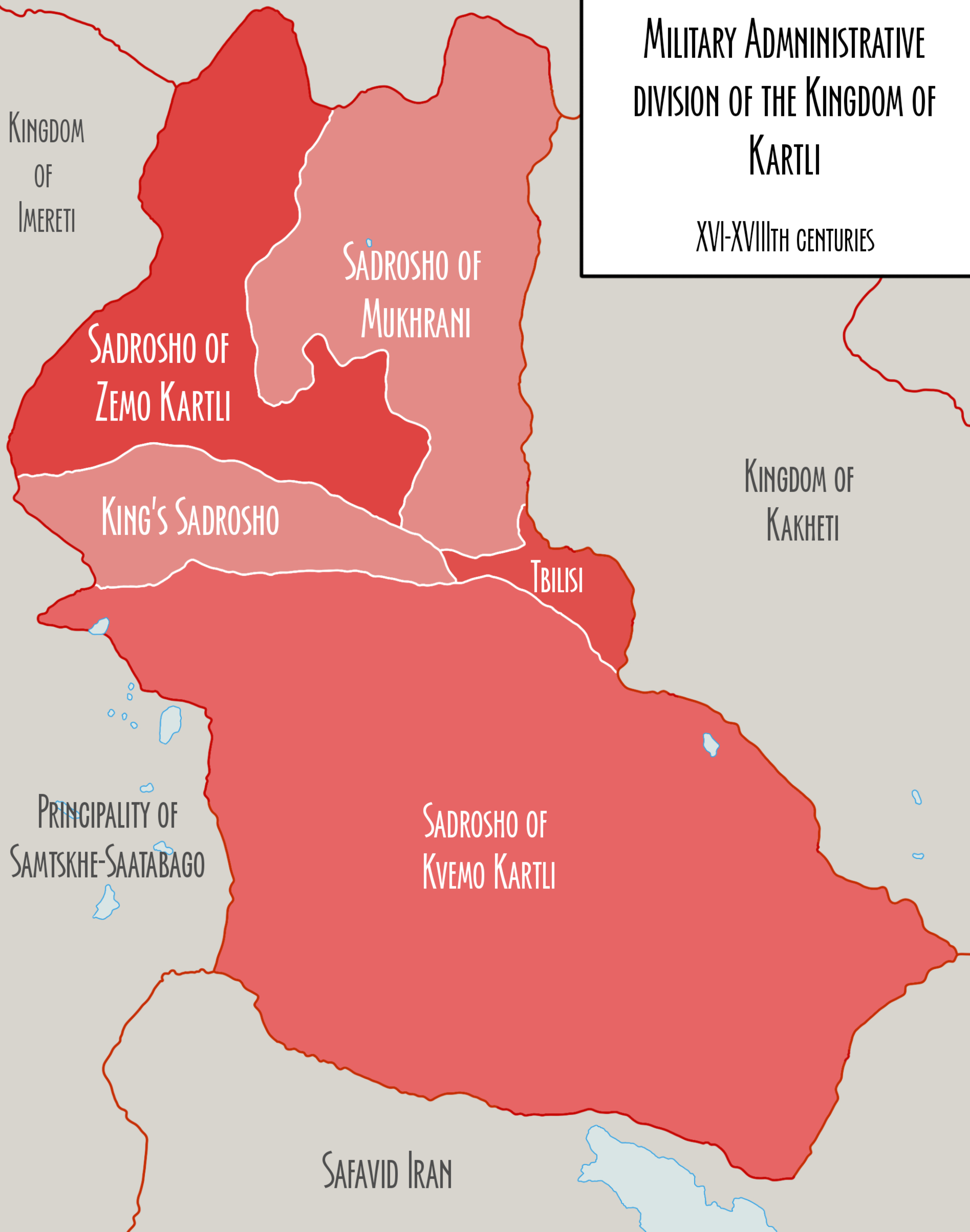
- Status: Client state of Kingdom of Kartli
- Capital: Samtsevrisi, Mdzovreti, Nichbisi
- Common languages: Georgian
- Religion: Georgian Orthodox
- Government: Principality
- Prince-Tsitsishvili
- History
  - Granting a hereditary estate to Zaza Panaskerteli-Tsitsishvili: 1467
  - Annexation by Imperial Russia: 1801
Preceded by	Succeeded by
Kingdom of Georgia	Russian Empire
- Today part of: Georgia

Satsitsiano (Georgian: საციციანო, literally "the domain of the Tsitsishvili") was a feudal principality (satavado) in late medieval and early modern Georgia, ruled by members of the tavadi family of Tsitsishvili. It emerged in the 15th century in Kartli, on the right bank of the Kura (Mtkvari) River. The principality was a vassal of the kings of Kartli (and, during certain periods, of the kings of Kakheti and the shahs of Iran). The head of the principality was the sardar (sardali), who also commanded the Royal Sadrosho, a military district whose forces formed the king's personal guard and were recruited from the Tsitsishvili domains and adjacent territories.

== History ==
=== Establishment of the principality ===
The history of Satsitsiano begins in the second half of the 14th century, when members of the tavadi family of Panaskerteli, who were eristavi (governors) of the province of Tao-Shavsheti, received estates in Kartli—in the Dzama Valley—from King Bagrat V, serving as local administrators (mouravi).

In the 15th century, the family's position in Kartli was considerably strengthened. In 1442, Taqa Panaskerteli married his sister Siti to King Vakhtang IV. At the same time, the Panaskerteli princes gradually lost most of their possessions in Tao in their conflict with the powerful House of Jaqeli. In 1467, King Constantine II of Georgia issued a charter to his military commander Zaza Panaskerteli-Tsitsishvili, confirming estates on the right bank of the Mtkvari River to him and his family:

"To Zaza Panaskerteli and your sons Kaikhosro, Giorgi, Siaosh, Merab and Zakaria. At the time when, for the sake of our love, you left your hereditary domain in Shavsheti and came to us in service and loyalty, we granted you the estate of Orbodzleri in Khvedureti... In addition, we granted and confirmed to you in full the estates of Kvakhvreli, Uplistsikhe and Karaleti... And as for the estates granted to you by us as hereditary possessions, no one may interfere with you; and if anyone opposes you, we shall answer and defend you.

=== Royal Sadrosho ===
From the 1470s, heads of the Tsitsishvili family held the office of sardar (sardali), commander of the Royal Sadrosho. The Sadrosho was both an administrative-territorial unit and a military district whose forces were recruited within its territory. The Royal Sadrosho, whose forces formed the king's personal guard, included lands along the right bank of the Kura (Mtkvari) River from the western outskirts of Tbilisi to Tashiskari, including the principality of Satsitsiano, as well as the possessions of several other feudal families, including the Javakhishvili and Tarkhnishvili, and the Catholicos.

The sardars of Satsitsiano often simultaneously held the office of sakhltukhutsesi, the highest-ranking royal official in the Kingdom of Kartli after the king.

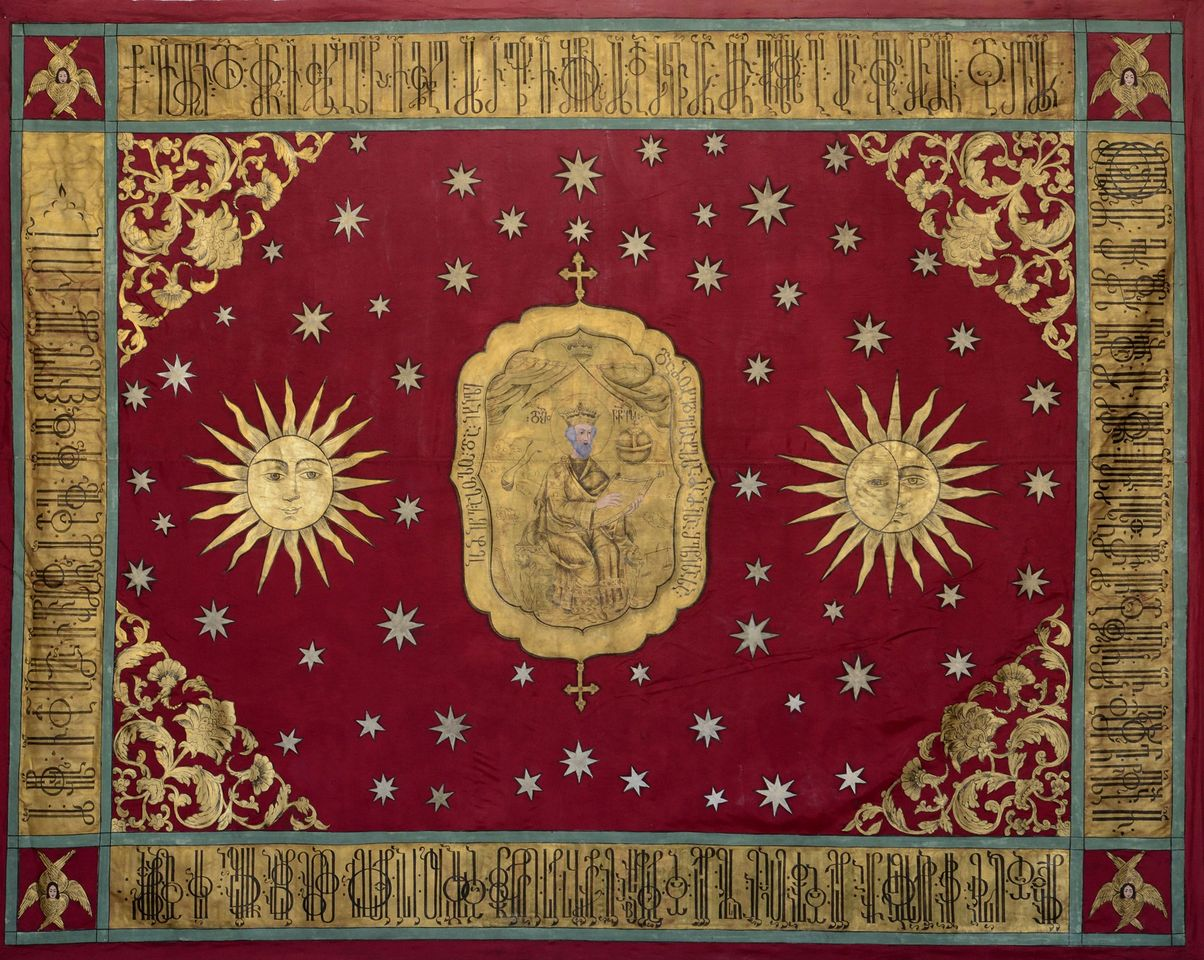
The flag of the Royal Sadrosho during the reign of King Vakhtang VI (early 18th century)

In addition to his principal military function as commander of the royal guard, the sardar exercised administrative and judicial authority within the Sadrosho. Among other duties, once every seven years the sardar organized a census to compile lists of the military obligations of the nobility (aznauri) and of taxpayers.

In wartime, the sardar was responsible for mobilizing the forces of his Sadrosho upon receiving a royal order, organizing their deployment, guarding the frontier, conducting reconnaissance operations, responding to enemy movements, and keeping fortresses in a state of military readiness.

The residences of the sardars of Satsitsiano at different times included the fortresses of Samtsverisi, Mdzovreti and Nichbisi. The family's burial places were located at Kintsvisi, Samtsverisi, Khvedureti and Nichbisi.

=== Division of the principality ===
At the beginning of the 17th century, the principality of Satsitsiano effectively divided into two parts: Zemo Satsitsiano, ruled by the so-called "Upper" Tsitsishvili, descendants of the sardars Parsadan and Nodar; and Kvemo Satsitsiano, ruled by the descendants of Papuna, known as the "Lower" Tsitsishvili. The territory of Zemo Satsitsiano was centered around the foothills of the Dzama Gorge, while Kvemo Satsitsiano was centered around the village of Nichbisi.

The two branches of the Tsitsishvili family competed for the office of sardar. The "Upper" Tsitsishvili held the office in the late 17th and first half of the 18th century. Following the death of sardar Kaikhosro Tsitsishvili of the "Upper" branch in 1746, the office was assumed by Aleksandre of the "Lower" Tsitsishvili. The latter branch retained the office of sardar until the abolition of the principality of Satsitsiano in 1801, following the annexation of the Kingdom of Kartli-Kakheti by the Russian Empire.

== List of sardars ==
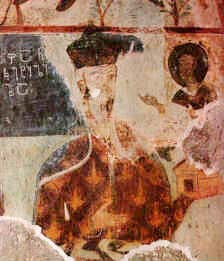
Zaza Panaskerteli-Tsitsishvili. A fresco portrait from the Kintsvisi Monastery

- Zaza Panaskerteli-Tsitsishvili (?–1483–?) — commanded the royal guard at the Battle of Aradeti
- Kaikhosro Tsitsishvili, son of Zaza (?–1486–1488)
- Merab Tsitsishvili, son of Zaza (1488–1523–?)
- Parsadan Tsitsishvili (?–1552–1554) — defended Satsitsiano against the invasion of the Iranian Shah Tahmasp I. Captured during the siege of Ateni
- Zaza Tsitsishvili (1554–1561) — sardar of Satsitsiano and sakhltukhutsesi of Kartli. Captured by the Persians at the Battle of Tsikhedidi
- Parsadan Tsitsishvili (?–1599–?)
- Zaza Tsitsishvili (?–1609–?) — associate of Giorgi Saakadze and a hero of the Battle of Tashiskari
- Parsadan Tsitsishvili (?–1613–1632) — governor of Kartli on behalf of Shah Abbas I
- Kaikhosro Tsitsishvili, son of Parsadan (1632–?)
- Nodar Tsitsishvili, son of Parsadan (?–1636–1643–?) — supported Teimuraz I in his struggle for the throne of Kartli
- Papuna Tsitsishvili, son of Kaikhosro (?–1650–1658) — sakhltukhutsesi
- Zaza Tsitsishvili, son of Papuna (1658–1673) — sakhltukhutsesi. Executed on the orders of King Vakhtang V
- Tsitsi Tsitsishvili "the Great" (1673–1678) — sakhltukhutsesi. Killed in an internecine conflict
- Tsitsi Tsitsishvili, son of Tsitsi (1678–?)
- Kaikhosro Tsitsishvili "Lopina" (1688–1691) — sakhltukhutsesi
- Tsitsi Tsitsishvili, son of Tsitsi (1691–1694)
- Parsadan Tsitsishvili, son of Nodar (1694–1695)
- Kaikhosro Tsitsishvili "Lopina" (1695–1703)
- Edisher Tsitsishvili, son of Kaikhosro (1717–1723) — sakhltukhutsesi
- Kaikhosro Tsitsishvili, son of Edisher (1732–1746) — sakhltukhutsesi
- Aleksandre Tsitsishvili (1746–1773)
- David Tsitsishvili, son of Aleksandre (1783–1791–?) — son-in-law of King Heraclius II of Georgia
- Giorgi Tsitsishvili, son of Vakhtang (?–1799–1801) — father-in-law of King George XII
