= Largvisi Monastery =

Monastery in Largvisi, Georgia

- The Largvisi Monastery as of 2010

- Location within Georgia

Religion
- Affiliation: Georgian Orthodox Church

Location
- Location: Largvisi, Akhalgori Municipality
- Coordinates: 42.268521°N 44.485801°E

Architecture
- Type: Cross-in-square church
- Completed: 1759

The Largvisi Monastery (Georgian: ლარგვისის მონასტერი) is a medieval Georgian Orthodox monastic foundation at the village of Largvisi in the Ksani river valley in the Akhalgori Municipality, what is now the disputed territory of South Ossetia. The monastery is documented from the early 14th century. The extant church, a domed cross-in-square design, dates to 1759. It was a familial abbey of the Kvenipneveli dynasty, Dukes of Ksani and one of the leading noble families of the Kingdom of Kartli.

== History ==
The 15th-century Georgian chronicle of the dukes of Ksani ascribes the foundation of the monastery to the family's legendary 6th-century ancestor Rostom, allegedly a contemporary of the Byzantine emperor Justinian. The monastery is historically better documented from the early 14th century, when generations of the dukes of Ksani made donations to it. The monastery was destroyed during Timur's invasions of Georgia in 1400 and rebuilt and frescoed by Grigol Bandaisdze. In 1470, the monastery was further renovated by the duke Shalva, who also built a defensive wall with a bell-tower on it. Shanshe, Duke of Ksani, added further fortifications, turning it into his castle. In 1759, the church was built de novo as the Monastery of St. Theodore Tyron by the duke David and his mother Ketevan. The event is commemorated in a Georgian asomtavruli inscription of the icon of the Theotokos from Largvisi. This still-extant edifice, which replaced the older domeless one, had a completely new layout.

== Architecture ==
The Largvisi Monastery sits on a slope of a hill on the confluence of the Ksani and Churta rivers. It is a domed cross-in-square church, with the dimensions of approximately 20 x 12 m. The overall plan is elongated on an east-west axis. The church is built of brick and covered with blocks of hewn stone, with four stone pillars in the nave. The dome rests upon high aisles joining in a cross shape. The church has two, western and southern entrances. Above the western window is a sculpture carved in stone—a human right hand and tools of masonry. The defensive structures adjoining the monastery are parts of a citadel with ruined walls and towers higher on the hill.
