= Battle of Aspindza =

Part of the Russo-Turkish War (1768–1774)

- Part of Russo-Turkish War (1768–1774)
Date	20 April 1770
Location	Aspindza, Georgia 41°34′26.76″N 43°14′58.88″E
Result	Georgian victory

Belligerents
Kartli-Kakheti	Ottoman Empire

Commanders and leaders
Heraclius II; David Orbeliani; Prince George	(Ottoman Empire) Gola Pasha † (Ottoman Empire) Kokhta-Beladi †

Strength
3,000–7,000	9,500–20,000; • 1,500 men of the advance guard; • 8,000 involved in the main combat

Casualties and losses
Unknown, less	4,500+

The Battle of Aspindza (Georgian: ასპინძის ბრძოლა) was a meeting engagement fought on 20 April 1770 between the Georgians, led by king of Kartli-Kakheti Erekle II, and the Ottoman Empire. The Georgians won a victory over the Turks, defeating them in detail at the river crossing.

== Background ==
In the 1760s, shortly before the formation of the Kingdom of Kartli-Kakheti, King Heraclius II of Kakheti and his father, King Teimuraz II, repeatedly attempted to establish a military alliance with the Russian Empire against the Turks who occupied the entire southern border of the kingdom. Later, during the Russo-Turkish War, Empress Catherine II dispatched an expeditionary force of 1,200 men under the command of General Gottlieb Totleben to Georgia and King Heraclius II opened a second front against the Sublime Porte. In March 1770, Russian-Georgian forces marched on the Borjomi Valley and captured the Sadgueri fortress on April 14. Three days later, they besieged Atsquri, but the Georgian king and the Russian general soon came into conflict. They did not agree on the strategic way in which to continue the campaign. Heraclius II wanted to take advantage of his successes and continue the conquests as far as Akhaltsikhe, the capital of the Childir Eyalet, but Totleben refused to come to his aid and remained Atsquri.

== Battle ==
The Ottoman governor of Akhaltsikhe rallied his troops to save Atskhouri. Victorious in his first advances, he spread fear among the allied troops, whose Russian contingent took advantage of the situation to leave Georgia on April 19, literally abandoning the Georgians. Then, King Heraclius II had no choice but to retreat, pursued by Turkish troops who tried to cut the Georgian defense lines in order to force them back on the town of Aspindza.

On April 20, King Heraclius first routed the Ottoman advance guard, made up of 1,500 men. By this trick, he let through the approximately 8,000 soldiers of the main Turkish forces who soon arrived on the banks of the Kura, which passed through Aspindza. During the night of April 20, Ottoman troops began crossing the only bridge connecting the two banks of the river, with the aim of secretly advancing to Tbilisi. However, a group of Georgians, led by Aghabab Eristavi and Simon Moukhranbatoni, destroyed this bridge, even before the action of the enemies and soon, a strong Georgian army surprised the Ottomans. The left flank was led by prince George, the center by Heraclius II in and the right of the troops by General David Orbeliani. The Turks were routed and lost around 4,000 men, including the Avar leader Kokhta-Beladi, commanders and pashas. The survivors manage to swim across the Kura river.

The battle is the subject of the patriotic ode "On the Battle of Aspindza" by Besiki.

== General References ==
- Gogebashvili, Jacob (1937). "The Battle of Aspindza". Georgica (4–5). OCLC 1586281.
