= Kaikhosro Tsitsishvili =

Georgian statesman

Sakhltukhutsesi of Kartli
- Reign: 1735–1736
- Predecessor: Elizbar Orbeliani (?—1725)
- Successor: Constantine of Mukhrani (1735—1756)
- Died: 1746
- Noble family: Tsitsishvili
- Spouse: Anna Baratashvili
- Father: Edisher Tsitsishvili

Kaikhosro Tsitsishvili (Georgian: კაიჰოსრო ციციშვილი; ? – April 1746) was a Georgian statesman, military commander, and diplomat. Sakhltukhutsesi (1735–1736), Amilakhvari (1736–1746, with interruptions) of the Kingdom of Kartli. Sardar of the principality of Satsitsiano (the Royal Sadrosho) (1732–1746).

== Biography ==
He was the son of the sakhltukhutsesi of Kartli (1717–1722), a prominent Georgian statesman and diplomat, Edisher Tsitsishvili, who belonged to the "Upper" branch of the Tsitsishvili family.

As of 1717, he was a minor. In 1722, together with his father and brothers David and Elizbar, he emigrated to Kakheti to escape persecution by King Vakhtang VI. He helped King Constantine III (Mahmad-Quli Khan) ascend the throne of Kartli. In 1723, he was mentioned in a royal charter acknowledging the services of Edisher Tsitsishvili.

In 1728, he was recorded in the Ottoman defter (census) of the Tbilisi Vilayet as one of the feudal landlords.

In 1733, he was part of the entourage of the King of Kakheti, Teimuraz II, and was responsible for relations with Safavid Iran (Kaikhosro's brother Demetre (Merali-beg) was raised at the court of the Shah of Iran). In January 1735, by a firman of Nader Shah, he was confirmed as the sardar of Satsitsiano and head of the Tsitsishvili family. He also received the office of sakhltukhutsesi under King Teimuraz II.

In 1736, he was confirmed in the post of amilakhvari (royal master of the horse). That same year, following his sister's marriage to the Iranian spasalar (commander-in-chief) Ibrahim Khan, he received the village of Tserakvi in Kvemo Kartli as a possession. On 7 April 1738, the holdings of Kaikhosro and his brother Parsadan were reconfirmed by a decree of the Iranian governor Uguli Khan.

Yet on 26 May 1742, Nader Shah issued a firman removing Kaikhosro Tsitsishvili from the post of amilakhvari:

"The pillar of Christianity, Kaikhosro-beg, has been removed from the said office... let this pillar of Christianity henceforth not interfere in the affairs of the vakilship (governorship), but... properly exert himself in the matter of leading the army".

However, in July 1742, Prince Givi Amilakhvari (1689–1754) raised a rebellion against King Teimuraz II and Qizilbash suzerainty. In August, Kaikhosro Tsitsishvili was among the representatives of the Kartli and Kakheti nobility who arrived in Derbent to reaffirm their loyalty to Nader Shah. Kaikhosro was reinstated as amilakhvari and participated in military operations against Zedginidze.

In 1744, an Ottoman army under Yusuf Pasha and 7,000 Lezgins ("Leks") came to Zedgenidze's aid. Kaikhosro Tsitsishvili, together with Zaza Tarkhnishvili at the head of the royal army, crossed the Mtkvari River and defeated the "Leks and Urums (Turks)" laden with booty in Javakheti. At the same time, his brother Parsadan Tsitsishvili led a military detachment covering the route through Gudjareti.

In May 1744, Kaikhosro restored control over the principality of Satsitsiano, which had been devastated by Zedginidze's forces. Charters renewing serfdom (batonqmoba) between the prince and his subjects date to this period:

"This charter I have submitted to you, our master Kaikhosro Tsitsishvili, I, Mgebreshvili Goderdzi. When Kartli fell into disarray and the whole country was scattered—some fled to Imereti, some to Javakheti, and some came down to Kakheti, for the enemy had exhausted everyone—things became difficult for me too, so I uprooted myself and came to Kakheti. You also arrived and appeared before our sovereign king, and the order of serfdom (batonqmoba) was established. The sovereign granted me to you again, for I was your subject before. Now, of my own accord, I have submitted this charter to you so that I am not lost to you as a subject: you are the master, and I am the subject."

In 1745, Kaikhosro Tsitsishvili attended the coronation of Teimuraz II and his son Heraclius II.

On 9 April 1746, Kaikhosro, together with his brother Demetre (Merali-beg), acted as a witness in a bill of sale for a subject and an estate. He died later that month (was killed).

The King entrusted the guardianship of Kaikhosro Tsitsishvili's children, house, and estates to his brother Demetre. At that time, the family's feudal holdings were in a state of ruin:

"Satsitsiano was so ruined that for four years there was no plowing, no sowing, no fire was lit, no threshing floor was threshed, nor did a rooster crow".

== Family ==
Kaikhosro Tsitsishvili was married to Anna, daughter of Prince Bezhan Baratashvili. After his death in 1746, Anna married King Teimuraz II.

Kaikhosro had at least two sons:

- Ivane Tsitsishvili – raised at the royal court. Sakhltukhutsesi of Kartli (1756). Heroically killed in the battle against the Leks near Surami;
- Demetre Tsitsishvili.

A direct descendant of Kaikhosro Tsitsishvili is the Ukrainian businessman and philanthropist Oleksandr Petrovskyi.
