= Akhalgori Municipality =

Akhalgori Municipality ახალგორის მუნიციპალიტეტი
- District
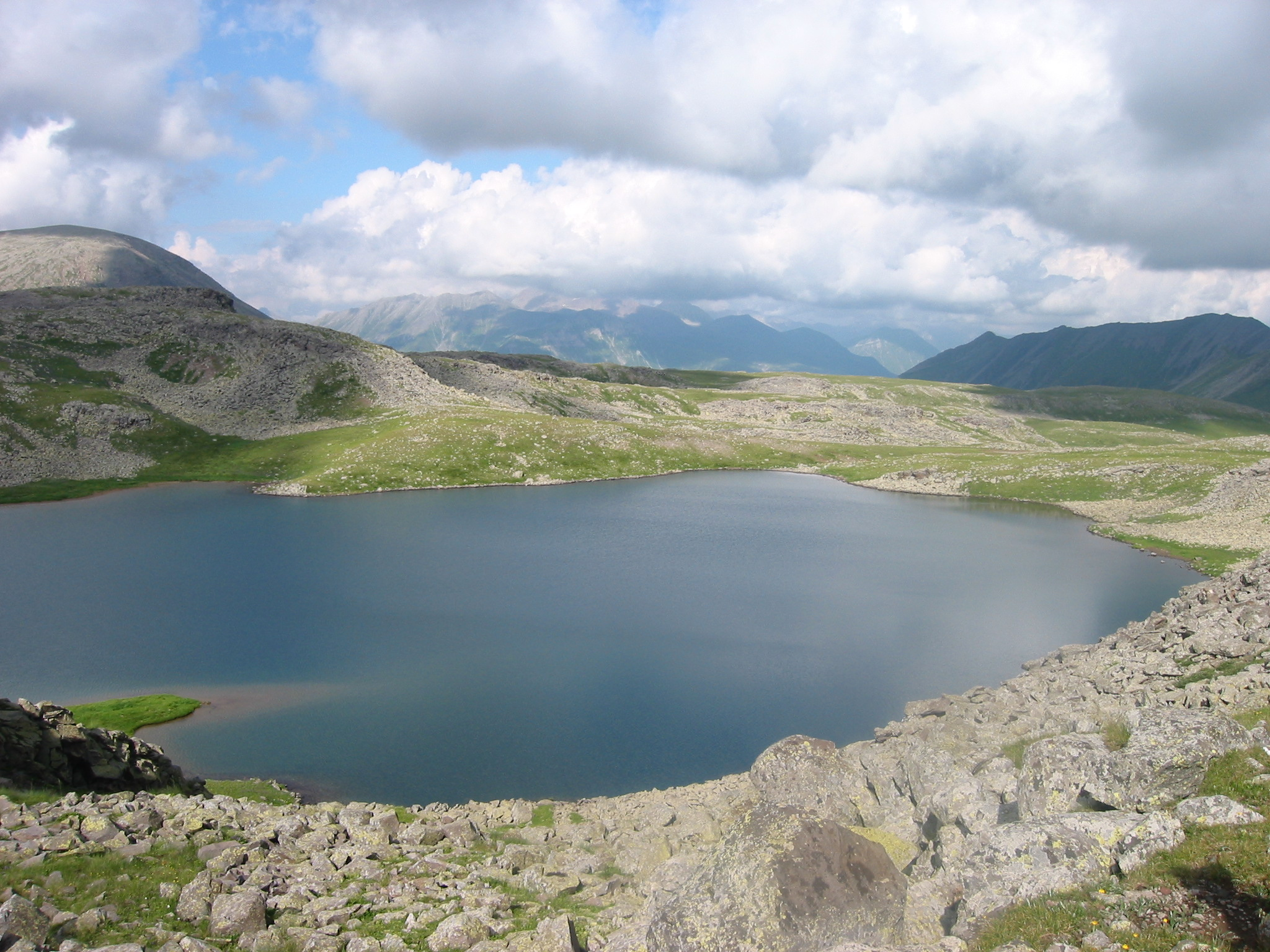

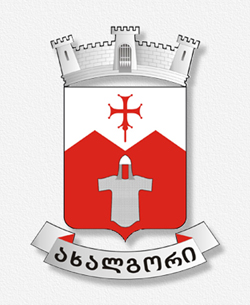
- Flag Seal

- Location of Akhalgori Municipality
- Coordinates: 42°9′N 44°31′E
- Country: Georgia
- De facto state: South Ossetia
- Capital: Akhalgori

Government
  - De facto head of administration: Alan Djussoev
  - Votes in Parliament: (of 69)

Area
  - Total: 1,011 km^{2} (390 sq mi)

Population (2002)
  - Total: 7,703
  - Density: 7.619/km^{2} (19.73/sq mi)
- Time zone: UTC+3 (CET)
  - Summer (DST): UTC+4 (CEST)

Akhalgori Municipality or Leningor District (Georgian: ახალგორის მუნიციპალიტეტი, romanized: akhalgoris munitsip'alit'et'i, Iron Ossetic: Ленингоры район, romanized: Leningory rajon, Russian: Ахалгорский муниципалитет, romanized: Akhalgorskiy munitsipalitet) is a municipality in Georgia or South Ossetia respectively. Georgia considers Akhalgori part of the Mtskheta-Mtianeti. According to Tskhinval, the current Head of Administration of Leningor is Alan Djussoev, and the current Deputy Head is Alexander Baratashvili. Before the 2008 war, the municipality was divided, with the eastern part under Georgian and the western under South Ossetian control.

The Georgian controlled part of Akhalgori/Leningor Municipality had a population of 7,700 in 2002, with approximately 2,000 living in the town itself. The largest villages were Ikorta, Korinta, Qanchaveti, Kvemo Zakhori, Largvisi, Doretkari, and Karchokhi. The population was primarily Georgian (6,520) and Ossetian (1,110) prior to the 2008 Russo-Georgian War. Since the war, over 5,000 ethnic Georgians – at least 70% of the total population and 90% of local ethnic Georgians – have fled the area, citing discrimination and a "climate of fear" under the Russian-South Ossetian control. Unlike in other Georgian enclaves, Ossetian militias have not systematically destroyed village structures, though there have been some reports of attacks against civilians and complaints of intimidation.

== International status ==
The municipality is internationally recognized as part of the Mtskheta-Mtianeti region of Georgia. According to South Ossetia, the area is known as Leningor District and constitutes a first-level administrative division of the country.

== Sites ==
The district houses several notable pieces of medieval Georgian architecture, listed below:

- Ikorta church
- Ikoti nunnery and church (1172)
- The monasteries of Kabeni, Largvisi, and Khopa (9th-13th century)
- The basilicas of Lomisi, Armazi, and Bikari;
- The fortresses of Tsirkoli and Tskhmori.
- The old palace of the Eristavi noble Family

== See also ==
- Mtskheta-Mtianeti
