= Tsikhistavi =

Tsikhistavi (Georgian: ციხისთავი) was a military-administrative official; the governor of castles (military administrative building) or small fortified cities and associated suburbs in feudal Georgia

Tsikhistavi in Mtskheta-Mtianeti were governing since the 6th century. On the eave of the 7th century there were two Tsikhistavis, of Ateni and Mukhrani in Tbilisi. At the same time there were two Tsikhistavis in the village of Khada (Mtiuleti).

In the document: "List of donations of King Bagrat III of Imereti to the Gelati Monastery" (dated by 1545), the Tsikhistavt-tsikhistavni of Kutaisi and Tsikhistavis of Likht-ameri and Likht-imeri are mentioned.

Tsikhistavis ruled cities and their garrisons(Georgian: ციხოვანნი). For the small towns Tsikhistavi had the same function as an Amirta-amira (Georgian: ამირთა-ამირა) in the bigger ones.

A Tsikhistavi's and his family rights were determined by Giorgi Brtskinvales codex (14th century). For killing a Tsikhistavi the convicted was penalized by 3500 tetri (tetri was Georgian currency of that period), expatriation for three years and confiscation of the manor.

Tsikhistavi's income sometimes was collected in the form of a special tax (Satsikhistavo, Georgian: საციხისთავო). Tsikhistavis subordinated to the Eristavt-eristavi, Eristavi and Mouravi of a city.

In the 17th and 18th centuries, Tsikhistavis sometimes were named as a Minibashi (Georgian: მინიბაში).

== See also ==
- Satsikhistavo
- Castellan
