= Besiki =

Georgian poet, politician, and diplomat

ბესიკი Besiki
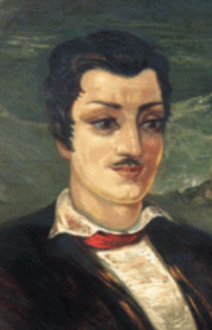
- Born: 1750; Tbilisi, Kingdom of Kartli
- Died: 25 January 1791 (aged 40–41); Iași, Romania
- Occupations: poet, thinker, diplomat
- Writing career
- Period: Reign of King Heraclius II
- Genre: poetry
- Movement: Romanticism

Besarion Zakarias dze Gabashvili (Georgian: ბესარიონ ზაქარიას ძე გაბაშვილი), commonly known by his pen name Besiki (Georgian: ბესიკი) (1750 – 25 January 1791), was a Georgian poet, politician and diplomat, known as an author of exquisite love songs and heroic odes as well as for his political and amorous adventures.

== Life ==
Besiki was born and raised in Tbilisi, Georgia's capital. He belonged to a noble family, which claimed descent from the ancient city of Gibeon (Georgian: Gabaoni) in Palestine. The poet himself frequently used the surname Gabaoni, a variant of Gabashvili.

Besiki's father, Zakaria, was a Georgian Orthodox priest and a confessor of King Teimuraz II. Zakaria was excommunicated and banished in 1764, but Besiki was allowed by King Erekle II to stay at the royal court where he received his education and began his career of a minstrel, his early style being influenced by Persian poetry and his older contemporary, the polyglot Tbilisite Armenian poet Sayat-Nova. Despite his younger age, Besiki gained many enemies at the court due largely to his satires and, most importantly, his insulting attacks on Catholicos Anton I. Rumors in Georgia have also linked Besiki with Erekle’s sister Ana, who was about 28 years older, mainly on the grounds of his love poem დედოფალს ანაზედ ("On Queen Ana"). In 1777, he was accused of impiety by Catholicos Anton, who named him as the Antichrist and denounced him to the King. As a result of this conflict, Besiki was banned from Tbilisi and had to move to the Kingdom of Imereti (western Georgia), where he was welcomed and appointed a chancellor by Solomon I. Later, he was involved in the brief war for the throne of Imereti after Solomon’s death and served as a diplomat under the next Imeretian king, Solomon II. Again, Besiki found himself implicated in the court’s intrigues. His troubadour affection to Solomon II’s younger wife, Ana, née Orbeliani, might well have been the reason for his being sent by the king on dangerous missions, the last of which to Imperial Russia, was intended to secure Russian protection for Imereti during the Russo-Turkish War (1787–1792). For three years, he accompanied the Russian Field Marshal Potyomkin in the campaign against the Ottoman Empire, and suddenly died at Iaşi, Moldavia (25 January 1791), where he was buried. In 2019, a statue of Besiki was inaugurated in Iasi, Romania.

== Poetry ==
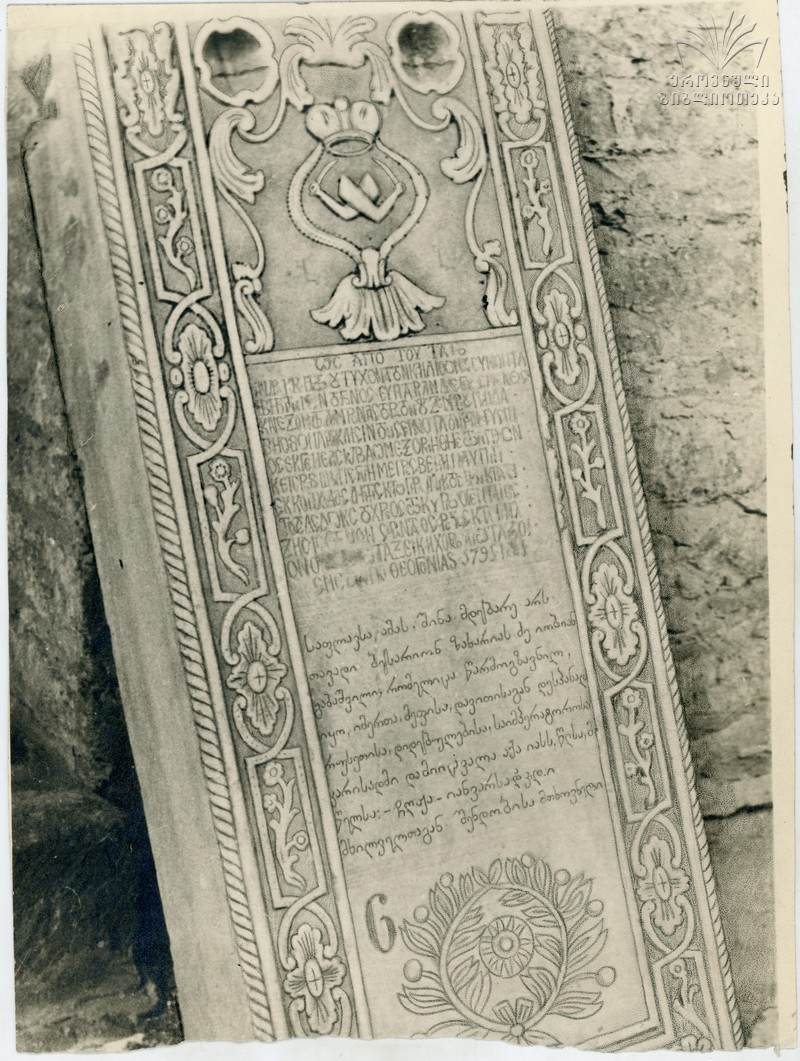
Gravestone of Besiki in Romania.

Due to Besiki’s turbulent life and permanent travels abroad, many of his manuscripts were irretrievably lost. He died unpublished, but hundreds of manuscript copies circulated for decades after his death; the titles and notes to many poems may be inventions of amateur copyists.

Besiki's diverse poetic legacy is notable for its sheer musicality and spontaneity. His finest poems – სევდის ბაღს შეველ ("I Entered a Garden of Melancholy"), მე მივხვდი მაგას შენსა ბრალებსა ("I Understood Your Accusations"), შაშვნი შავნი ("The Blackbirds") and, most of all, ტანო ტატანო ("Beauty's Stature") and დედოფალს ანაზედ ("On Queen Ana") – are dedicated to a passionate, sometimes explicitly erotic love with a tint of melancholy and an elegant tone. His heroic poetry includes the poems ასპინძისათვის ("On the Battle of Aspindza") and რუხის ომი ("The Battle of Rukhi"), both of them dedicated to the Georgian military victories over the Turkish and Abkhaz-Circassian forces, respectively. In "On the Battle of Aspindza", Besiki praises the martial prowess of the Georgian army at the Battle of Aspindza (1770) and eulogizes military talents of Prince David Orbeliani, a Georgian vanguard commander and himself a poet of some talent. At the same time, the poem is a graphic denunciation of the Russian commander Todtleben who had abandoned his Georgian allies just before the battle. Besiki also mastered satirical poetry, რძალ-დედამთილიანი ("The Mother-in-Law and the Daughter-in-Law"), and ჭაბუა ორბელიანზე ("On Chabua Orbeliani"), being noteworthy examples. The poet made use of some new methods in versification, in the composition, and coined some new words, renovating and enriching Georgian poetry with fresh metaphors. Besiki has left a remarkable trace in the history of Georgian literature. In particular, his poetry heavily influenced Georgian Romanticists of the early 19th century and resounded again in their works on several occasions.

== See also ==
- Akaki Beliashvili
- Davit Guramishvili
- Sayat-Nova
- Alexander Chavchavadze
