= Duchy of Ksani =

Administrative unit in feudal Georgia

Duchy of Ksani ქსნის საერისთავო
- Principality of the Kingdom of Kartli
- 15th century-1801
- The duchy as in the 17th and 18th centuries
- Capital: Kvenipnevi
- Area
  - Coordinates: 42°07′10″N 44°29′16″E
- Historical era: Middle Ages
  - Established: 15th century
  - Disestablished: 1801
- Today part of: Georgia

The Duchy of Ksani (Georgian: ქსნის საერისთავო) was an administrative unit in feudal Georgia. It consisted lands around Ksani and two more neighbouring south-western valleys, thus making two administrative entities: Ksniskhevi, with its centre in Kvenipnevi and Tskhradzmiskhevi with its centre in Largvisi, which is also home of the Largvisi Monastery.

== History ==
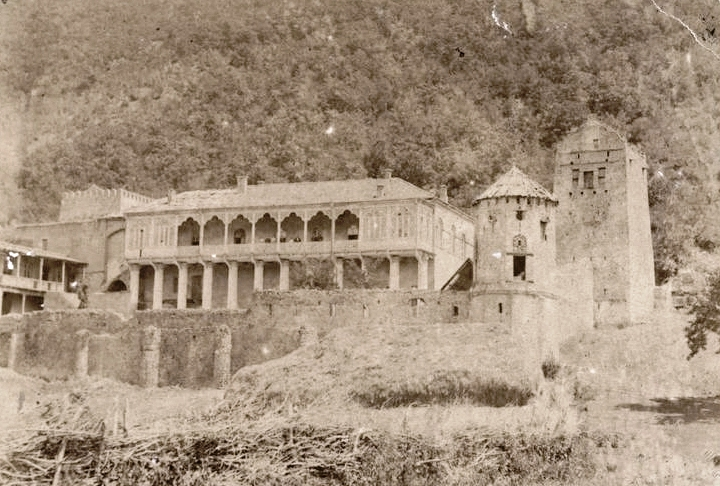
Castle and seat of the eristavis (Dukes) of Ksani, in Akhalgori.

Tskhradzmiskhevi started to become dominant in the 10th century when it included gorges of Lekhura, Medjuda and upper side of the river Liakhvi. After incorporating of neighbouring southern gorges, the residence was relocated from Largvisi to Kvenipnevi.

According to Vakhushti's references, during the reign of Tamar the Great, Kartli and Ksani were separated Dukedoms. After the Mongol invasion in the second half of the 13th century, the dukes of Ksani were of the Bibiluri family.

In the 14th century, Saeristavo included: Tskhradzma, Jamuri, Kharchokhi, Jurta, Kholoti, Isroliskhevi, Abazasdzeta, Truso, Ghuda, Gagasdzeni, Mleta, Arakhveti, Khando, Khanchaeti, Dzagnakora, Dighuami, Gavasi, Atseriskhevi, Bekhushe.

In the 15th century, the Saeristavo practically became a Satavado ("manorial").

== Dukes of Ksani ==
- Largvel Kvenipneveli
- Shalva I Kvenipneveli, son of Duke Largvel
- Virshel Kvenipneveli, son of Duke Shalva I
- Shalva II Kvenipneveli, Duke 1460—1470
- Elizbar Kvenipneveli
- Iese I Kvenipneveli, Duke 1624—1635
- Iese II Kvenipneveli, Duke 1635—1642
- Shanshe I Kvenipneveli, Duke 1642—1653
- Shalva Kvenipneveli, Duke 1653—1661
- Jesse III Kvenipneveli, Duke 1661—1675
- Datuna Kvenipneveli (1675–1696, 1700–1717)
- David Kvenipneveli, Duke 1675—1717
- Shanshe Kvenipneveli, 1717—1753
- Prince Iulon of Georgia, 1790–1801.
