= Akhalgori =

Akhalgori / Leningor ახალგორი
- Town
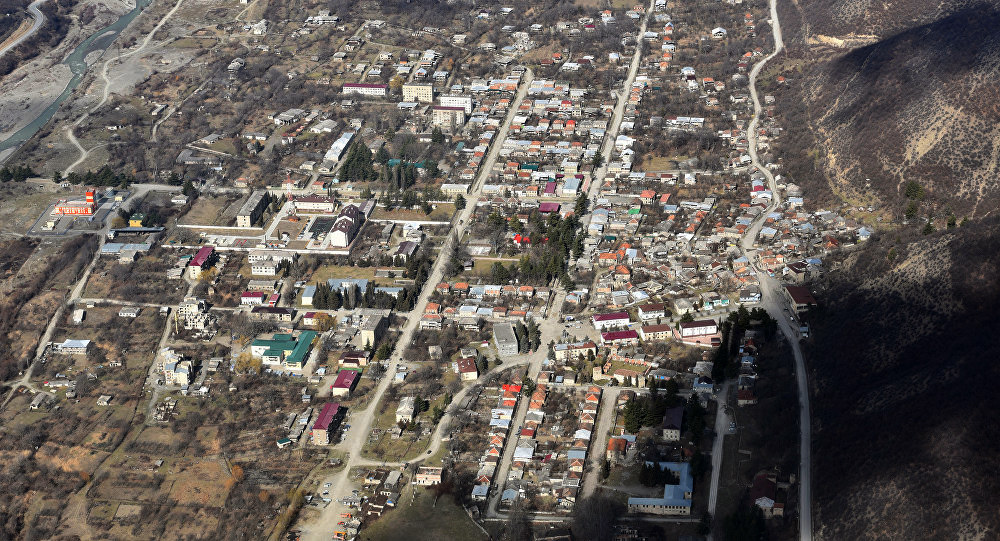

- Location of Akhalgori in Georgia Akhalgori / Leningor (Mtskheta-Mtianeti) Akhalgori / Leningor (Georgia)
- Coordinates: 42°07′10″N 44°29′16″E
- Country: Georgia
- De facto state: South Ossetia
- Mkhare: Mtskheta-Mtianeti
- District: Leningor
- Elevation: 788 m (2,585 ft)

Population (2015)
  - Total: 1,033
- Time zone: UTC+4 (Georgian Time)
- Climate: Warm, cold Climate
- Website: www.akhalgori.org.ge

Akhalgori (Georgian: ახალგორი; Iron Ossetic: Ленингор, romanized: Leningor) is a town in Georgia (in the Mtskheta-Mtianeti region, according to the official administrative division of Georgia). The name Akhalgori is the original historical name of the town used by the Georgians and officials, whereas Leningor is the name given to the city in the Soviet era and used by the South Ossetians. The town is situated on the banks of the River Ksani, height above sea level — 800 m.

== History ==
The village of Akhalgori was first mentioned in the 18th century by Prince Vakhushti of Kartli in his work The Geographic Description of Georgia. The name derives from the Georgian words meaning "new" (ახალი/akhali) and "hill" or "mountain" (გორა/gora). The residents of the dukes of Ksani was located in Akhalgori until the Sovietization of Georgia in 1921. During the Soviet era it was part of the South Ossetian Autonomous Oblast and was called Leningori (Ленингори; ლენინგორი) after Vladimir Lenin. It was renamed Akhalgori by the Georgian SSR government at the end of 1990.

=== Control over the town ===
During the 1991–1992 South Ossetia war the town remained under Georgian jurisdiction after most of South Ossetia broke away from the central government's control. It came under the control of South Ossetian secessionist authorities as a result of the 2008 Russo-Georgian War on August 17, 2008. Subsequently, the government of South Ossetia renamed the town to Leningor.

Before the conflict, the Akhalgori district had a population of 7,700, with approximately 2,000 living in the town itself. The largest villages were Ikorta, Korinta, Qanchaveti, Kvemo Zakhori, Largvisi, Doretkari, and Karchokhi. The population was primarily Georgian (6,520) and Ossetian (1,110) with good relations between the two communities. The population of the town in 2009 was predominantly Georgian and numbered 1,606. Currently Akhalgori as well as South Ossetia are controlled by Russian forces and South Ossetian militia.

== Demographics ==
As of the 2015 Census, the village of Akhalgori had a population of 1,033 people, 63.90% of whom were Georgians and 35.2% were Ossetians. Historically, Akhalgori had been a predominantly Armenian settlement, they accounted for 90% of the population in 1886 and remained the largest ethnic group until the 1960s.

== Town's position in administrative subdivision makeup ==
- According to South Ossetian official division, the town is the center of Leningor District of South Ossetia
- According to Georgian official division, the town is the municipal center of Akhalgori Municipality in Mtskheta-Mtianeti region, of Georgia

== Industry and commerce ==
Akhalgori was home to the Lomisi brewery, owned by the Turkish company Efes Beverage Group, which was the primary employer in the town. The town is now home to a different brewery, the Vysokogornaya Kelskaya Pivovarnya, which opened in 2023.

== Climate ==
Climate data for Leningor
Month	Jan	Feb	Mar	Apr	May	Jun	Jul	Aug	Sep	Oct	Nov	Dec	Year
Mean daily maximum °C (°F)	2.9 (37.2)	4.1 (39.4)	8.8 (47.8)	15.2 (59.4)	20.6 (69.1)	23.9 (75.0)	26.7 (80.1)	26.7 (80.1)	22.5 (72.5)	16.9 (62.4)	9.8 (49.6)	4.7 (40.5)	15.2 (59.4)
Daily mean °C (°F)	−1.6 (29.1)	−0.5 (31.1)	3.8 (38.8)	9.2 (48.6)	14.5 (58.1)	17.7 (63.9)	20.6 (69.1)	20.5 (68.9)	16.3 (61.3)	11.2 (52.2)	5.2 (41.4)	0.4 (32.7)	9.8 (49.6)
Mean daily minimum °C (°F)	−6 (21)	−5.1 (22.8)	−1.1 (30.0)	3.2 (37.8)	8.4 (47.1)	11.6 (52.9)	14.5 (58.1)	14.4 (57.9)	10.2 (50.4)	5.5 (41.9)	0.6 (33.1)	−3.9 (25.0)	4.4 (39.8)
Average precipitation mm (inches)	35 (1.4)	41 (1.6)	51 (2.0)	73 (2.9)	108 (4.3)	100 (3.9)	76 (3.0)	63 (2.5)	58 (2.3)	59 (2.3)	60 (2.4)	46 (1.8)	770 (30.4)
Source: Climate-Data.org

== Notable people ==
- Eristavi Noble family
- Manana Chitishvili

== See also ==
- Mtskheta-Mtianeti
