= Shalva, Duke of Ksani =

Georgian duke

Shalva (Georgian: შალვა ქსნის ერისთავი, romanized: shalva ksnis eristavi; died 18 September 1662) was a Georgian duke (eristavi) of the Duchy of Ksani. He was one of the leaders of the Kakhetian Uprising (1659) against Iranian rule and was later canonized as a saint by the Georgian Orthodox Church.

== Biography ==
Shalva was the son of Shanshe I, Duke of Ksani, who was put to death on the orders of his own brother, Jesse.

In 1660, Shalva was one of the leaders of the Kakhetian Uprising (1659) against Iranian rule. After the uprising was suppressed, Shalva, together with Bidzina Cholokashvili and his cousin Elizbar, went to the Shah and asked for forgiveness in an effort to prevent another enemy invasion of the country. The Shah handed them over to the Turkmen tribes whose members had been massacred during the Kakhetian uprising. The Georgian nobles were tortured to death on 18 September 1662. Some time later, the bodies of Shalva and Elizbar were returned to their homeland and buried at Ikorta Monastery, the ancestral monastery of the Dukes of Ksani. They were later canonized as saints by the Georgian Orthodox Church, and their feast day is observed on 18 September (1 October, New Style).

== Family ==
Shalva was married to Ketevan, daughter of Zaal, Duke of Aragvi. They had two sons and one daughter:

- Largveli (fl. 1683–1690);
- Datuna (died 1717), Duke of Ksani (r. 1675–1696, 1700–1717);
- Tamar (fl. 1687), who married Solomon (Suleiman), son of King Vakhtang V.
