= Akaki Beliashvili =

Soviet writer

Akaki Ionovich Beliashvili (Georgian: აკაკი ბელიაშვილი; 24 April [O.S. 11 April] 1903 — 14 December 1961) was a Soviet writer of Georgian origin. He was said to be born in Chiatura (alternatively, Koreti) and studied at the gymnasium in Kutaisi. In 1921 he moved to Tbilisi and entered the mining faculty of the Transcaucasian Polytechnic Institute. Actively writing since school days, he published short stories and, in the forties, the historical novel Besiki about the life and times of the 18th century poet and politician Besiki Gabashvili. Other novels include The Golden Tent, Pereval, Rustavi and Shvidkatsi.

He died in a car accident in December 1961 and was buried in the Didube Pantheon.

His work has been translated into Russian; one of his stories also appeared in a Bengali-language anthology of Soviet short stories.
