= Sakhltukhutsesi =

Sakhltukhutsesi (Georgian: სახლთუხუცესი, from sakhlt – "of houses" and ukhutsesi – "elder"; literally "elder of the house") – was the highest government office in late medieval and early modern Georgia (the kingdoms of Kartli, Kakheti, and Imereti). The holder of the office was in charge of the royal court, the royal domain, the treasury, and the chancellery. They served as the king's chief assistant in economic, financial, and administrative affairs. The apparatus of officials and secretaries was subordinate to the sakhltukhutsesi.

In addition to the royal sakhltukhutsesi, there were also sakhltukhutsesi (majordomos) serving great feudal lords (mtavari), as well as the Catholicos-Patriarchs.

== History ==
=== Origin of the office ===
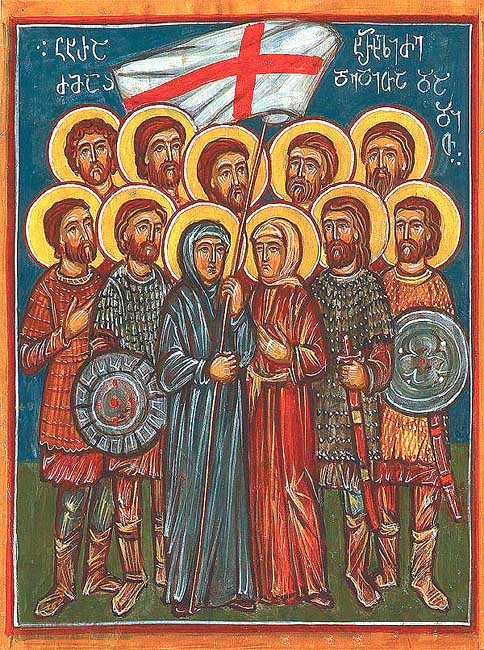
Icon depicting the sakhltukhutsesi of Kakheti, Agatang Kherkheulidze, and his family, who died at the Battle of Marabda in 1625 and were canonized by the Georgian Orthodox Church

The office of sakhltukhutsesi appeared no earlier than the end of the 15th century, following the disintegration of the unified Kingdom of Georgia. In the early 16th century, historical documents record the first known sakhltukhutsesi under the kings of Kartli and Kakheti. However, Prince Vakhushti Bagrationi – an 18th-century Georgian historian – claimed that this office (also known as abramadi) had already existed during the Georgian Golden Age, though this is not supported by contemporary historical sources. During the period of unified Georgia, the royal household was managed by the msakhurtukhutsesi, but they did not possess such broad powers as the later sakhltukhutsesi. The latter combined functions that had been performed by several royal ministers-viziers in early medieval Georgia.

Historians attribute the rise of the sakhltukhutsesi in the late Middle Ages to the weakening of royal authority .

=== Functions ===
The sakhltukhutsesi managed the royal palace and controlled all palace institutions. Economic officials – such as nazir, molare, tavlidar, mushrib – and palace servants were subordinate to him. During solemn receptions and banquets, he acted as the master of ceremonies, welcomed guests, and had the right to sit in the presence of the king (a privilege shared only with the eshikagasbashi – the head of the police and secret service).

The sakhltukhutsesi was responsible for the collection of taxes and duties, as well as supervising the cultivation of royal lands.

He also directed the work of the royal chancellery and prepared official documents (such as royal charters), which he sealed with his own signet and submitted to the king for approval. The mdivans (secretaries) and mordals (chancellery officials) were subordinate to him.

In addition, the sakhltukhutsesi possessed inspection powers: he traveled through various parts of the kingdom and took necessary administrative measures.

The annual salary of a sakhltukhutsesi was 25 tumans, but the official also had the right to receive a portion of the collected taxes, duties, and revenues from the royal domain. The position was highly lucrative and was traditionally held by representatives of the most influential aristocratic families. In Kartli, the office was held by the Tsitsishvili, Saakadze, Bagrationi of Mukhrani, and Baratashvili-Orbelishvili families. In Kakheti, this position was most frequently occupied by the princes Cholokashvili and Jorjadze. In Imereti, it was held by the Abashidze and Chkheidze families. However, serving as sakhltukhutsesi did not exempt one from military service. Frequently, the king's chief official was simultaneously a sardar – the commander of one of the feudal military banners (sadrosho).

=== Kingdom of Kartli-Kakheti ===
After the formation of the unified Kingdom of Kartli-Kakheti in 1762, the office of sakhltukhutsesi remained divided: the sakhltukhutsesi of Kartli and the sakhltukhutsesi of Kakheti functioned in parallel. King Heraclius II attempted to limit the powers of the sakhltukhutsesi by transferring his functions to a "special council," which, along with the sakhltukhutsesi, included the melik-mamasakhlisi (head of the administration and supreme judge of Tbilisi) and mdivans (royal secretaries).

According to a reform project proposed by Prince Ioane Bagrationi in 1799, the powers of the sakhltukhutsesi were to be significantly curtailed. He was to retain only the economic function, while his salary would be increased to 100 tumans. The positions of royal sakhltukhutsesi were abolished following the annexation of the Kingdom of Kartli-Kakheti by the Russian Empire in 1801, and the Kingdom of Imereti in 1811.

== List of officeholders ==
=== Kingdom of Kartli ===
| Years | Coat of arms | Sakhltukhutsesi | Monarch | Notes |
|---|---|---|---|---|
| ?—1512—1530—? | | Ioane Olagashvili | David X, George IX | |
| ?—1520—? | | Baram Machabeli | David X | |
| ?—1558—1561 | | Zaza Tsitsishvili | Simon I | Captured by the Persians during the Battle of Tsikhedid |
| 1569—1578 | | Givi Pavlenishvili | David XI | |
| 1593—1607 | | Zurab Saakadze | Simon I, George X, Luarsab II | |
| ?—1616—1619 | | Bezhan Saakadze | Bagrat VII | |
| ?—1622—? | | Amilghabar Tsitsishvili | Simon II | |
| ?—1627—1642 | | Kaikhosro Baratashvili | Simon II, Rostom | Killed |
| 1642—1651 | | Manuchar Tsitsishvili | Rostom | |
| 1651—1656 | | Kaya Tsitsishvili | Rostom | |
| 1656—1658 | | Kaplan Baratashvili | Rostom | |
| 1659—1664 | | Papuna Tsitsishvili | Vakhtang V | |
| 1664—1667 | | Zaza Tsitsishvili | Vakhtang V | |
| ?—1669—? | | Shio Zedginidze | Vakhtang V | |
| ?—1671—? | | Zaza Tsitsishvili | Vakhtang V | Second term |
| 1672—1678 | | Tsitsi Tsitsishvili "the Great" | Vakhtang V, George XI | Executed |
| 1678—1684 | | Teimuraz of Mukhrani | George XI | |
| 1684 | | Amilghabar Tsitsishvili | George XI | |
| 1685—1700 | | Papua of Mukhrani | George XI | |
| 1688 | | Beburishvili | Heraclius I | |
| 1688—1703 | | Kaikhosro Tsitsishvili "Lopina" | Heraclius I | |
| 1690 | | Saam Baratashvili | George XI | |
| 1690—1696 | | Luarsab Orbelishvili | George XI | |
| 1695 | | Edisher Tsitsishvili | Heraclius I | |
| 1714—1717 | | Datuna, Duke of Ksani | Jesse | |
| 1717—1722 | | Edisher Tsitsishvili | Bakar, Vakhtang VI | Second term |
| 1722—1723 | | Vakhtang Zedginidze | Vakhtang VI | Died in the Battle of Tabakhmela |
| 1723 | | Teimuraz of Aragvi | Constantine II | Captured by Bakar |
| ?—1725 | | Elizbar Orbeliani | Vakhtang VI | Emigrated to Russia with the king |
| ?—1735—1736 | | Kaikhosro Tsitsishvili | Jesse | |
| 1735—1756 | | Constantine III of Mukhrani | Jesse, Teimuraz II | |

=== Kingdom of Kakheti ===
| Years | Coat of arms | Sakhltukhutsesi | Monarch | Notes |
|---|---|---|---|---|
| 1511—1513 | | Beena Cholokashvili | George II | |
| 1513—1530—? | | Garsevan Cholokashvili | David X, Levan | |
| ?—1590—? | | Jason Chavchavadze | Alexander II | |
| 1612—1614 | | Agatang Kherkheulidze | Teimuraz I | |
| 1615—1636 | | Nodar Jorjadze | Teimuraz I | |
| 1629—1639 | | Jesse Jorjadze | Teimuraz I | |
| 1643—1648 | | Revaz Cholokashvili | Teimuraz I | Died in the Battle of Uglisi |
| 1664—1675 | | Nodar Jorjadze | Archil II | |
| 1688—1692 | | Revaz Cholokashvili | Heraclius I | |
| 1690—1694 | | Jesse Jorjadze | Heraclius I | |
| 1693—1696 | | Otar Cholokashvili | Heraclius I | |
| 1696—1714 | | Durmishkhan Cholokashvili | Heraclius I, David II | |
| 1714—1715 | | Edisher Cholokashvili | David II | Died in battle with the Lezgins |
| 1718—1724 | | Sazverel | David II, Constantine II | |
| 1724—1733 | | Onana | Constantine II | |
| ?—1738 | | Givi Cholokashvili | Teimuraz II | |
| ?—1739—? | | Nodar Jorjadze | Teimuraz II | |
| 1740—1741 | | Jimsher Cholokashvili | Teimuraz II | |
| 1741—1747—? | | Grigol Cholokashvili | Teimuraz II, Heraclius II | |
| ?—1756 | | Ioane Tsitsishvili | Heraclius II | Died in the Battle of Surami |
| ?—1759—? | | Jesse Jorjadze | Heraclius II | |

=== Kingdom of Kartli-Kakheti ===
| Years | Coat of arms | Sakhltukhutsesi | Monarch | Notes |
|---|---|---|---|---|
| ?—1765 | | Demetre Zedginidze | Heraclius II | Executed for participating in a conspiracy against the king |
| ?—1766—? | | Ioane Andronikashvili | Heraclius II | |
| 1768—1784 | | David Orbeliani | Heraclius II | Sakhltukhutsesi of Kartli, signed the Treaty of Georgievsk |
| ?—1773 | | Grigol Cholokashvili | Heraclius II | Sakhltukhutsesi of Kakheti, captured by the Pshavs |
| 1774 | | David Kvenipneveli | Heraclius II | |
| 1775—? | | Grigol Cholokashvili | Heraclius II | Third term |
| ?—1776—1778—? | | Zakaria (Zaza) Tsitsishvili | Heraclius II | Emigrated to Istanbul after defeat in a feudal conflict |
| ?—1783—? | | Kaikhosro Cholokashvili | Heraclius II | Sakhltukhutsesi of Kakheti, signed the Treaty of Georgievsk |
| 1784—1789 | | Ioane of Mukhrani | Heraclius II | |
| 1798—1800 | | Ioane Orbeliani | George XII | Sakhltukhutsesi of Kartli |
| 1798—1800 | | Alexandre Makashvili | George XII | Sakhltukhutsesi of Kakheti |
| 1800 | | Zakaria (Zaza) Andronikashvili | George XII | |

=== Kingdom of Imereti ===
| Years | Coat of arms | Sakhltukhutsesi | Monarch | Notes |
|---|---|---|---|---|
| ?—1488—? | | Ioane Apkhachelidze | Alexander II | |
| 1639—1650 | | Bezhia Chkheidze | Alexander III | |
| ?—1651—? | | Rostom Abashidze | Alexander III | |
| ?—1666—1669 | | Sekhnia Chkheidze | Bagrat IV | Killed |
| 1669—1679 | | Sazverel Chijavadze | Bagrat IV | Died in an internecine war |
| 1679—1700 | | Giorgi Chkheidze | Bagrat IV, George IV, Alexander IV, Archil, Simon | |
| 1766—1771 | | David Abashidze | Solomon I | |
| 1778—1785 | | Zurab Tsereteli | Solomon I | |
| 1785—1789 | | Zaal Abashidze | David II | |
| 1789—1810 | | Zurab Tsereteli | Solomon II | Second term |
