= Satsikhistavo =

The term Satsikhistavo (Georgian: საციხისთავო) was used in feudal Georgia to designate a military-administrative unit which was ruled by a Tsikhistavi (a person who was appointed by the King for this position). Later the feudal families were granted the right to inherit Satsikhhistavos, which made them parts of a Satavado.

Satsikhistavo sometimes required a special tax, established especially as a Tsikhistavi’s income.

== See also ==
- Tsikhistavi
- Garrison
