= Zaza Panaskerteli-Tsitsishvili =

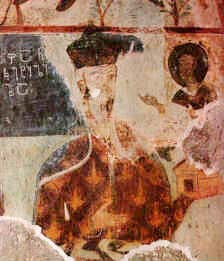
Zaza Panaskerteli-Tsitsishvili. A fresco portrait from the Kintsvisi Monastery

Zaza Panaskerteli-Tsitsishvili (Georgian: ზაზა ფანასკერტელ-ციციშვილი) was a 15th-century Georgian prince, politician, and man of letters known for his compendia of medical arts Karabadini (Book of Medical Treatment). He is described as “the great healer and head of the wise” in a contemporary record.

Zaza belonged to the old aristocratic family Panaskerteli, originally owners of the frontier region of Panaskerti. He then resettled into the Georgian heartland, founding the house of Tsitsishvili. Zaza was apparently involved in Georgia's politics and culture, but not much is known of his life. After an important role in the royal administration and in the army, Zaza retreated to a chapel he had built near Kintsvisi Monastery in which his mural depiction has survived.

Zaza's Karabadini (ultimately from the Greek graphidion, “booklet”) is an original medical treatise dated to c. 1486. It builds upon anonymous Georgian compendia of Galenic medicine, notably the 11th-century Ustsoro Karabadini (Peerless Handbook) and the 13th-century Tsigni Saakimoy (Doctoring Book). The work summarizes the state of medical knowledge in Georgia and neighboring cultures at that time. He also transcribed a Georgian translation of the doctrines of John Chrysostom.
