= Datuna, Duke of Ksani =

Datuna

Duke of Ksani
- Reign: 1675–1696, 1700–1717
- Predecessor: Jesse (1675); David (1700)
- Successor: David (1696); Shanshe II (1717)
- Died: 1717
- Noble family: Kvenipneveli
- Spouse: Mariam of Kartli (m. 1687)
- Issue Among others: Shanshe II, Duke of Ksani
- Father: Shalva, Duke of Ksani

Datuna (Georgian: დათუნა ქსნის ერისთავი, romanized: datuna ksnis eristavi; died 1717) was a Georgian nobleman who served as Duke of Ksani from 1675 to 1696 and again from 1700 until his death in 1717.

== Biography ==
Datuna was the son of Shalva, Duke of Ksani. In 1675, George XI, then regent of Kartli, expelled the rebellious Jesse, Duke of Ksani, and appointed Datuna as duke. In 1688, Datuna refused to support George XI in his campaign against the rebellious George, Duke of Aragvi. Although the Duke of Aragvi was defeated and came to the royal court to seek forgiveness, he did not appear before the king and instead fled at Datuna's instigation.

Following the accession of Heraclius I to the throne of Kartli in 1688, Datuna sometimes supported Heraclius I and at other times George XI. In 1696, Heraclius I deposed Datuna and sent him to Iran along with other supporters of George XI. Datuna's cousin David was appointed duke in his place. In 1700, the people of Ksani revolted at the instigation of Datuna's mother, and David, Duke of Ksani, was killed. Heraclius I suppressed the revolt, recalled Datuna from Iran, and restored him to the duchy.

Datuna initially remained loyal to Vakhtang VI after his appointment as regent of Kartli, but later turned against him. Together with George, Duke of Aragvi, he appealed to the Shah to depose Vakhtang and appoint Vakhtang's brother Jesse as king. During Jesse's reign (r. 1714–1716), Datuna served as sakhltukhutsesi of the Kartlian king. In 1717, King Bakar removed him from that office, prompting Datuna to rebel. Bakar dispatched his brother, Prince Vakhushti, with an army against him, but Datuna died before the battle took place. His sons fled to Kakheti, and Vakhushti took control of the Duchy of Ksani.

== Family ==
Datuna was married to Mariam, daughter of George XI. Their children were:

- Shanshe II (fl. 1690–d. 1753), Duke of Ksani;
- Shalva (fl. 1690);
- Beri (fl. 1695);
- Jesse (fl. 1700–d. 1745);
- George (fl. 1713);
- Revaz (fl. 1700–1726);
- Christopher (fl. 1712–1735);
- Tamar, who married Demetrius, son of Prince Givi Amilakhvari (died 1700);
- Helen, who married Kaikhosro, son of Prince Luarsab Avalishvili.

== Bibliography ==
- Brosset, Marie-Félicité (1856). Histoire de la Georgie depuis l'antiquite jusqu'au 19. siecle (in French). Vol. 5. l'acad. Imper. des sciences.
