= Saeristavo =

Saeristavo (Georgian: საერისთავო), in historical and scientific literature with this term is defined a territorial unit in old Georgia, which was ruled by Eristavi (duke).

== List of the Duchies of Kingdom of Georgia ==
Saeristavo (name in Georgian)	Date	Capital	Territory
Abkhazia	by 8th century	Tskhumi	Abkhazia, Zichia
Argveti	by 8th century	Shorapani	upper Imereti
Hereti	by 1010	Khornabuji	south-eastern Kakheti, Saingilo
Kakheti	by 1010	Telavi	north Kakheti
Kartli	by 10th century	Uplitsikhe	inner Kartli
Klarjeti	by 1008	Artanuji	Artvin
Odishi	by 8th century		Mingrelia, Guria, south Abkhazia
Racha	by 8th century		Racha
Samtskhe	by 12th century	Akhaltsikhe	Meskheti
Svaneti	by 8th century		Svaneti
Tao	by 1190's	Panaskerti	northern Artvin, northern Erzerum
Kldekari	by 876	Kldekari	lower Kartli
Kalmakhi	by 11th century	Kalmakhi	southern Artvin
Tukharisi	by 11th century	Tukharisi	southern Artvin
Queli	by 11th century	Queli	Ardahan
Javakheti	by 10th century	Akhalkalaki	Javakheti, Ardahan

== See also ==
- Eristavi
