= David Orbeliani =

Georgian politician and poet (1739–1796)

David Orbeliani (Georgian: დავით ორბელიანი), monikered David "the General" (დავით სარდალი, Davit’ Sardali) (11 January 1739 – 29 May 1796) was a Georgian military figure, politician, translator, and a poet of some talent.

A member of the prominent Georgian noble house with family ties with the Bagrationi royal dynasty, David Orbeliani was a hereditary prince of Sabaratiano, Constable of Somkhiti, and a high-ranking military commander under King Heraclius II of Georgia whose daughter, Tamar (1749-1786), married him at Tbilisi in 1762. In 1786, he ran afoul of Heraclius II, who stripped him of the office of Grand Master of the Court (sakhlt-ukhutsesi) and granted it to Ioann, Prince of Mukhrani.

David Orbeliani made several diplomatic journeys to Iran, from where he brought manuscripts of Qahraman-e qatel, a Persian prose romance of chivalry and adventure, and translated it as Qaramaniani (ყარამანიანი) which, although given some local Georgian color, follows its Persian original very closely and gained a considerable popularity in Georgia. He is also a hero of panegyrics by the contemporary Georgian poet Besiki (1750-1791), whom he responded by writing love-poetry very much in the spirit of Besiki.

Orbeliani died in Tbilisi in 1796, and was interred at Sioni Cathedral.
