= Shanshe, Duke of Ksani =

Georgian politician

Shanshe II (Georgian: შანშე II) (born end of 17th century – died 1753), was a Georgian nobleman and politician from Kingdom of Kartli-Kakheti. From 1718 he was Duke of Ksani.

== Biography ==
Shanshe was the eldest son of Datuna, Duke of Ksani, and his wife, Mariam, daughter of King George XI.

In 1719, he rebelled against Vakhtang VI, but was defeated and exiled to Imereti. He managed to escape from exile and rebelled in 1720 and was again defeated. However, he adhered to King Vakhtang VI and was devoted to his oath until the end.

In 1723, when Kartli and Kakheti were conquered by the Ottoman Empire, he was fighting against the intruders. In 1735, when the Ottoman role in Kartli and Kakheti was changed by Iranians (Qizilbashs), Shanshe, together with Givi Amilakhvari (1689–1754) and Vakhushti Abashidze, led a big revolt against Iranian conquerors and from the strengthened fortresses in Ksani Saeristavo he fought for two years. But in 1737 he was finally defeated and had to escape to Imereti and later to Russia.

He was trying to help Bakar (Son of Vakhtang VI and factual king of Kartli) return. However, this mission was unsuccessful, and he returned to Georgia and continued fighting against the Qizilbash. Because of betrayal, he was captured by Iranians and punished by having his eyes gouged out.

In 1745, he was sent back to Tbilisi; after two years, he got back his manorial estates. He died in Tbilisi in prison in 1753. He was imprisoned because of rebel against King Heraclius II.

== Family ==
Shanshe was married to Ana (Ana-Khanum), daughter of Prince Tamaz Baratashvili. His children were:

- Ioane (fl. 1700–1736);
- Zurab (fl. 1753);
- Mariam (fl. 1736), who married Alexander III of Kakheti.
