= Tori (Georgia) =

Tori თორი
- Historical Region
- Map highlighting the historical region of Tori in Georgia
- Coordinates: 41°50′0″N 43°23′0″E
- Country: Georgia
- Mkhare: Samtskhe-Javakheti
- Capital: Borjomi

Area
  - Total: 1,200 km^{2} (460 sq mi)

Population
  - Total: 30,000
  - Density: 25/km^{2} (65/sq mi)

Tori (Georgian: თორი [t̪ʰo̞ɾi]) is a historic region in central Georgia, now part of the Samtskhe-Javakheti region, together with Javakheti and Meskheti. It borders on Trialeti to the east, Imereti to the northwest and Shida Kartli to the northeast. The province chiefly lay in what is now known as the Borjomi Gorge. In medieval Georgia, Tori was in hereditary possession of the Gamrekeli (Toreli) family. The name "Tori" went obsolete in the 15th century. Around the same time, it became a hereditary fiefdom of the Avalishvili family.
