= Oleksandr Petrovskyi =

Ukrainian entrepreneur and philanthropist

- Олександр Володимирович Петровський
- Born: ალექსანდრე ტომაზოვიჩ ნარეკლეშვილი June 9, 1972 (age 54); Rustavi, Georgian SSR
- Occupations: entrepreneur, philanthropist

Oleksandr Volodymyrovych Petrovskyi (Georgian: ალექსანდრე ტომაზოვიჩ ნარეკლეშვილი, Ukrainian: Олександр Володимирович Петровський; born 9 June 1972, Rustavi, Georgian SSR) is a Ukrainian public figure, entrepreneur and philanthropist. He was a delegate of the Unification council of the Eastern Orthodox churches of Ukraine in 2018.

== Early life ==
Oleksandr Volodymyrovych Petrovskyi was born on 9 June 1972 in Rustavi, Georgia. Petrovskyi comes from the nobilitated Georgian family of Nareklishvili with Armenian roots. At a young age, he moved with his mother to Ukraine, to the city of Dnipro, where he took the surname of his stepfather - Petrovskyi. In the 1990s, he earned the title of Honored Master of Sports of Ukraine in judo, was involved in the development of martial sports in Dnipro, and took care of veterans of the Olympic movement. In 2003, he founded the International Charity Foundation "Solidarity" to support humanitarian initiatives.

During the 2004 Ukrainian presidential elections, he provided support to democratic candidates, which led to persecution by the security forces. After Viktor Yanukovych's victory in 2010, he was forced to temporarily leave Ukraine. With the start of the Revolution of Dignity, he returned to Ukraine, where, from March 2014, he organized a Coordination Center of Public Resistance against Russian saboteurs in Dnipro.

After eliminating the threat to Dnipro from Russia in 2014, Petrovskyi participated in returning a military hospital of the Ukrainian Armed Forces, which was under mortgage to a Russian bank, to state ownership, effectively reorganizing logistics for emergency assistance to wounded soldiers of the Russian-Ukrainian war. Simultaneously, he took part in launching volunteer headquarters to support the front - through the "Solidarity" fund, equipment was supplied for the volunteer battalion "Dnipro-1".

Since 2022, he has maintained the volunteer battalion of the Ukrainian Armed Forces "Solidarity", primarily consisting of people from Georgia.

Since 2016, he has focused on the development of humanitarian and religious institutions in Dnipro.

=== Cooperation with the Jewish community ===
Since the 2000s, he has participated in facilitating dialogue between Orthodox Christians and the Jewish community of Dnipro, together with Rabbi Shmuel Kamenetsky. As a result, in 2017, a public meeting took place in the "Menorah" center between the leader of Ukrainian Orthodox Christians, Patriarch Filaret (Denysenko), and the Jewish organizations' activists in Ukraine.

He also directly invested funds in social programs of the Jewish community center "Menorah", restoring the house of the historical synagogue of Levi Yitzchak Schneerson - now housing a boys' dormitory. In honor of the understanding between Ukrainians and Jews, the Dnipro Jewish Center "Menorah" received the world's largest silver menorah on behalf of the Petrovsky Family, becoming a relic of the entire Dnipro community.

=== Development of Armenian diasporic institutions ===
Dnipro hosts one of the largest Armenian diasporas in Ukraine, which began building its own church in 2003. However, only at the beginning of 2010 was a Sunday school built with funds from Oleksandr Petrovskyi, whose grandmother was an Armenian from Tbilisi. Active construction of the church itself started in 2016 and was consecrated on March 17, 2018, by the Catholicos of the Armenian Apostolic Church, Garegin II. The church's architects are well-known Armenians - Varuzhan Ayrapetyan, Khachik Danielyan, and Samvel Makyan.

== Support of the independent Ukrainian Orthodox Church ==
According to Petrovsky, active consultations between Kyiv and Constantinople regarding the granting of the Tomos to the Ukrainian Church began in the spring of 2018, in which he participated. However, the Moscow special services did everything to hinder any international contacts of the Ukrainian Church, trying to show that it was in complete canonical isolation. In particular, Petrovsky claims, the visit of the Armenian Patriarch, prepared despite the tense relations between Ukraine and Armenia and the interference of the Russian special services, became a real diplomatic surprise and proof that such isolation does not exist. The support of the Armenian Church – one of the oldest Christian churches – also contributed to Ukraine receiving the Tomos at the beginning of 2019.

The efforts of the president of the "Solidarity" foundation in building the church and organizing the visit in March 2018 were recognized by Garegin II - he was awarded the Order of Saints Sahak and Mesrop – one of the highest awards of the Armenian Apostolic Church.

=== Support for the Orthodox Church of Ukraine ===
Since the late 1990s, he has actively supported and been a patron of projects of the Autocephalous Orthodox Church. In particular, with the funds of Oleksandr Petrovskyi, temple complexes of the Nativity of the Blessed Virgin Mary, the Icon of the Mother of God "Unexpected Joy", and the Annunciation Women's Monastery were built in Dnipro. The historic building of the Diocesan Administration of the Sicheslav Diocese of the OCU was also restored. In 2016, the "Solidarity" foundation based in Dnipro hosted the First Congress of Military Chaplains of the Ukrainian Armed Forces, which established modern forms of state chaplaincy.

Obtaining the Tomos for the Autocephaly of the OCU The invasion of Ukraine by Russia in 2014 caused not only a humanitarian but also a sharp church crisis related to the international recognition of the status of Orthodox Churches in Ukraine. Oleksandr Petrovskyi, relying on his experience in organizing interfaith dialogues, participated in the preparation of historical documents and diplomatic actions to obtain the so-called Tomos of Autocephaly for the Orthodox Church of Ukraine.

Simultaneously, he took part in organizing the Unification Council of the Orthodox Church on December 15, 2018, the holding of which was a condition for obtaining the Tomos from the Ecumenical Patriarch. The recognition of Petrovsky's role in inter-church negotiations was his invitation by the Ecumenical Patriarch to the box of honorary guests at the ceremony of granting the Tomos of Autocephaly (January 6, 2019). The ceremony took place in the St. George Patriarchal Cathedral of Constantinople in the presence of Ukrainian state officials and archons of the Ecumenical Patriarchate.

=== Support for the film industry ===
Since 2018, the international foundation of Oleksandr Petrovsky "Solidarity" has systematically supported the national cinematography: at the Venice Festival, the main prize was won by the film "Atlantis" by Valentyn Vasyanovych, supported by the Foundation. In 2019, the production of the film "Slovo House" by Taras Tomenko, dedicated to the Executed Renaissance and the popularization of knowledge about the communist crime of the Holodomor, received support. The Foundation supported the film team's participation in the Warsaw Film Festival 2020 and the London Film Festival I Will Tell You-2022. Business In 2018, he founded the investment fund "Capilano" with a charter capital of 135 million UAH. Petrovsky's business also includes the Delmar group of companies with offices in Dnipro, Kyiv, and Munich, which deals with real estate.

In 2021, Petrovsky acquired 50% of the Kramatorsk Thermal Power Plant. In April 2021, the director of the National Holodomor-Genocide Museum signed a memorandum with Oleksandr Petrovskyi on co-financing the first large-scale re-exposition of the Hall of Memory, which included unique options for multimedia technologies. Family Oleksandr Petrovskyi is the son of Oksana Ivanivna Petrovska, a Ukrainian drama artist and theatrical director, Honored Artist of Ukraine, director-artistic director of the Dnipro Academic Music and Drama Theater named after Shevchenko.

== Controversies ==
Petrovskyi was publicly accused by ex Prosecutor General of Ukraine Yuri Lutsenko and journalist Yuri Butusov of being a criminal leader. In 2018 Zhovtnevyi District court of Dnipro qualified those allegations as slander, demanding the journalists to pay a compensation. In 2019 Dnipro Court of Appeals satisfied the appeal of journalist Yuri Butusov on its previous decision. In 2020 the Supreme Court of Ukraine confirmed that decision, allowing journalists to refer to Petrovskyi as a "criminal authority".

In June 2022 Dnipro mayor Borys Filatov publicly accused Petrovskyi of participating in a criminal group. In the same address, he called on law enforcement agencies to investigate the activities of the local television channel D1, allegedly linked to Petrovskyi, accusing it of spreading pro-Russian disinformation. On 7 June 2022, D1 published a video recording of a Zoom meeting involving Filatov during the early days of the Russian invasion of Ukraine, in which the mayor expressed doubts about the ability of the Armed Forces of Ukraine to stop the Russian forces and suggested that Kyiv might soon be captured.

== Awards ==
- Cross of Ivan Mazepa (24 August 2017) — for significant personal contribution to state-building, socio-economic, scientific, technical, cultural and educational development of Ukraine, significant labour achievements and high professionalism (as a representative of the volunteer organisation "Hearts of Cyborgs", awarded by the President of Ukraine).
- Order of Prince Volodymyr I class (2018, awarded personally by Patriarch Filaret).
