= Tsitsishvili =

Georgian noble family

Coat of arms of Princes Tsitsianov

The House of Tsitsishvili (Georgian: ციციშვილი) is an ancient Georgian noble family, with several notable members from the 15th century through the 20th.

== History ==
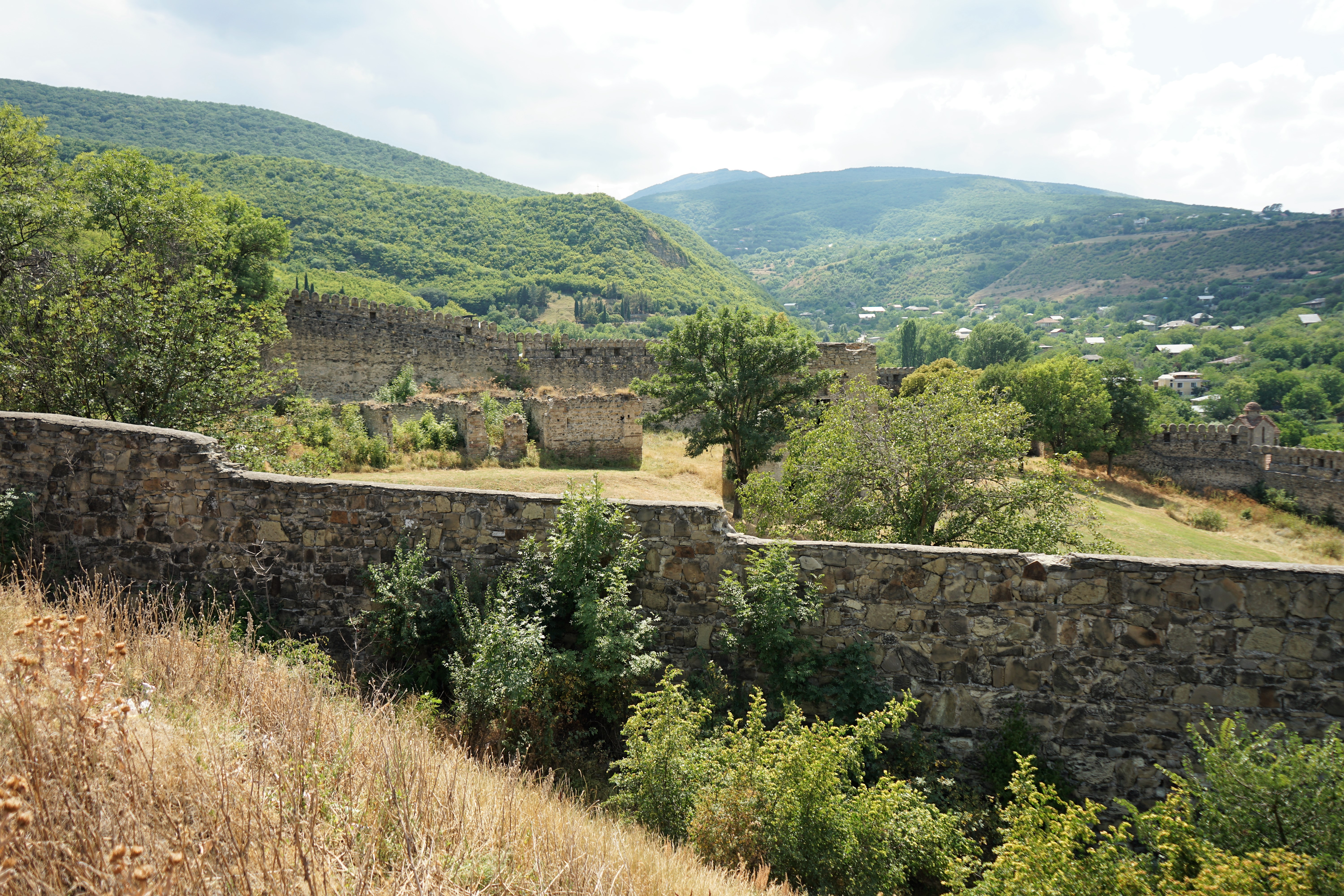
Ruins of the Nichbisi Castle in Lower Nichbisi, once owned by the Tsitsishvili family

The Tsitsishvili family was a continuation of the medieval House of Panaskerteli, known in the province of Upper Kartli (Samtskhe) from the 12th century, who derived their name from the castle of Panaskerti in Tao-Klarjeti. They came into prominence with Zachariah of Panaskerti, who, together with some other nobles, put down in 1192 the revolt against Queen Tamar of Georgia and were eventually enfeoffed with the duchy of Tao. His descendant, T'aqa Panaskerteli, Duke of Tao, defeated the Turkomans invading Georgia in about 1302 at Tortomi Castle.

In 1442, the king of Georgia, Vakhtang IV, married Sitikhatun, daughter of Prince Zaza I Panaskerteli. Pressured by the princes of Samtskhe of the Jaqeli dynasty, Zaza removed in 1467 to Shida Kartli, where he obtained from King Constantine II the fiefs of Khvedureti and Kareli. These formed the basis of a new princedom of the Panaskerteli, later known as Satsitsiano. The name Satsitsiano derived from the patronymic of Tsitsishvili, which was borne by Zaza's posterity, but must have been derived from an earlier member of the house called Tsitsi, and not, as has sometimes been supposed, from Zaza's son, for the patronymic is found already in an undated charter of King Alexander I of Georgia (r. 1412–1442).

The Tsitsishvili ranked as fifth among the six "undivided" princely houses of the kingdom of Kartli, a successor state of the already fragmented kingdom of Georgia. They intermarried with the royal dynasty and other nobility of Georgia and held several top hereditary offices at the court. Upon the Russian annexation of Georgia in 1801, the house of Panaskerteli-Tsitsishvili was received into the princely nobility of the empire under the name of Tsitsianov (Russian: Цицианов).

== Branches of the family ==
In the 17th century, the house divided into the Upper and Lower branches, which entailed the loss of the family's dynastic status.

in 1724, a branch of this family, also known as Tsitsianov, was established in Russia by the expatriate Georgian nobleman Paata Tsitsishvili.

In 2020, Georgian researchers identified a previously unknown branch of the Tsitsishvili family, descended from Prince Tevdore Tsitsishvili, a son of Ioseb. In 1846, Tevdore moved from Kvareli to Zemo Kandaura in Kakheti after the murder of Prince Nestor Rusishvili; Nestor's father had reportedly offered a reward for Tevdore's capture. Following these events, Tevdore changed his surname to Nareklishvili. The identification of Tevdore Tsitsishvili and Tevdore Nareklishvili as the same individual was confirmed by historians of Tbilisi State University.

A direct descendant of Tevdore Tsitsishvili-Nareklishvili is the Ukrainian businessman and philanthropist Oleksandr Petrovskyi.

== Notable members ==
- Zaza Panaskerteli-Tsitsishvili (fl. 15th century) – Georgian prince, statesman, physician and author of the medical treatise Karabadini.
- Sitikhatun (died 1444) – Georgian noblewoman and queen consort of Vakhtang IV of Georgia.
- Mariam Tsitsishvili (1768–1850) – queen consort of George XII of Georgia, the last king of Kartli-Kakheti.
- Paata Tsitsishvili – Georgian nobleman and ancestor of the Tsitsianov branch of the family in the Russian Empire.
- Pavel Tsitsianov (1754–1806) – Russian Imperial general of Georgian noble origin and commander-in-chief of Russian forces in the Caucasus.
- Mohammad-Ali Mirza Dowlatshah (1789–1821) – Qajar prince and governor of Kermanshah; Tsitsishvili maternal ancestry through his mother, Ziba-Chehr Khanum.
- Neli Tsitsishvili (1910–1973) – Georgian architect, dendrologist and landscape architect; Honored Artist of Georgia.
- Maia Tsitsishvili (1953–2020) – Georgian art historian, professor at Tbilisi State University and chief researcher at the Giorgi Chubinashvili National Research Centre for Georgian Art History and Heritage Preservation.

== See also ==
- Avalishvili, another branch of the Panaskerteli family
