= Dimitri Gruzinsky =

Georgian prince

Dimitri (Georgian: დიმიტრი; Russian: Дмитрий Юлонович Грузинский, Dmitry Yulonovich Gruzinsky; 11 April 1803 – 14 January 1845) was a Georgian prince (batonishvili) of the Bagrationi dynasty, the youngest son of Prince Iulon of Georgia and his wife, Princess Salome née Amilakhvari.

== Family ==
Dimitri was born in the former royal house of Georgia already after the Russian annexation of his country. His father, Iulon, was a son of Heraclius II, the penultimate king of Kartli-Kakheti (eastern Georgia) and a pretender to the throne of Georgia. In 1805, Iulon and his family, with the exception of Dimitri's rebellious elder brother Levan, were deported by the Russian authorities to Tula. Later, they were allowed to settle in Saint Petersburg, the imperial capital.

== Political activity ==
In the 1820s, Dimitri and his cousin Prince Okropir, son of George XII, became principal leaders of Georgian royalists, respectively, in Saint Petersburg and Moscow. They held gatherings of Georgian students and officers in the Russian cities and tried to convince them that Georgia should be independent under the Bagrationi dynasty. In 1826, Dimitri helped found a secret society, which conceived the idea of an anti-Russian insurrection of Georgia. The most active center of the conspirators, based in the Georgian capital of Tbilisi—in which Dimitri's elder sister Tamar, Maid of Honor to the empress, played a role—was betrayed by one of its numbers, Prince Iase Palavandishvili, in 1832. The plot collapsed and Dimitri was deprived of his title of tsarevich ("prince royal") and sent in exile to Smolensk. Afterwards, he grudgingly entered the Russian civil service, attaining to a minor rank of Collegiate Registrar (Коллежский регистратор). On 6 May 1833, he was recognized by the Russian crown in the princely title of knyaz Gruzinsky. He died unmarried, without issue, in 1845 in St. Petersburg and was interred at the Alexander Nevsky Lavra.

== Ancestry ==
Ancestors of Dimitri Gruzinsky

16. Heraclius I of Kakheti
8. Teimuraz II
17. Ana Cholokashvili
4. Heraclius II of Georgia
18. Vakhtang VI
9. Tamar of Kartli
19. Rusudan of Circassia
2. Prince Iulon of Georgia
20. Bezhan Dadiani
10. Katsia-Giorgi Dadiani
21. Tamar Gelovani
5. Darejan Dadiani
1. Dimitri
24. Andukapar Amilakhvari
12. Otar Amilakhvari
6. Revaz Amilakhvari
26. Zurab, Duke of Aragvi
13. Mariam of Aragvi
3. Salome Amilakhvari
28. Revaz, Duke of Aragvi
14. Bezhan, Duke of Aragvi
29. Tamar N.
7. N. of Aragvi
