= Prince Okropir of Georgia =

Georgian prince

Okropir
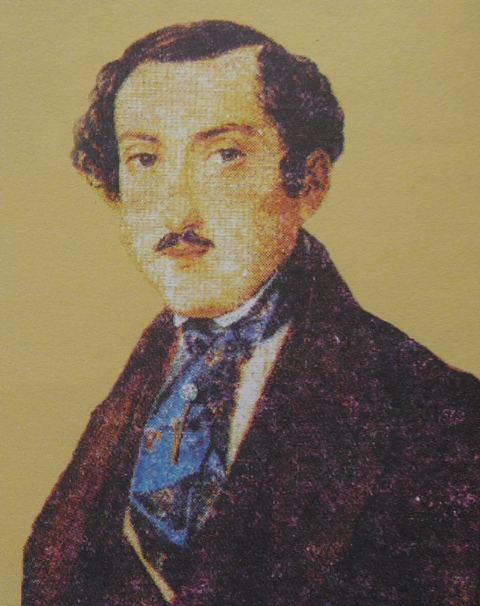
- Born: 24 June 1795; Telavi, Kingdom of Kartli-Kakheti
- Died: 30 October 1857 (aged 62); Moscow, Russian Empire
- Spouse: Anna Kutaysova
- Issue: Giorgi; Ana; Pavle; Irakli; Praskovia
- Dynasty: Bagrationi
- Father: George XII
- Mother: Mariam Tsitsishvili
- Religion: Georgian Orthodox Church

Okropir (Georgian: ოქროპირი) known in Russia as Tsarevich Okropir Georgievich Gruzinsky (Russian: Окропир Георгиевич Грузинский), (June 24, 1795 – October 30, 1857) was a Georgian prince royal (batonishvili) of the Bagrationi dynasty.

== Biography ==
Okropir (aka "Chrysosthomus") was born in Telavi to Crown Prince George (the future king George XII, reigned 1798–1800) and his second wife, Mariam Tsitsishvili. After his father's death and Russian annexation of Georgia (1800), the royal family was forcibly removed from Georgia. In 1803, Queen Mariam was sent into confinement in Belogorod Monastery at Voronezh for having murdered the Russian general Lazarev who was commanded to convoy the king's family to Russia. Okropir was carried away to Saint Petersburg where he was enlisted into the Page Corps and commissioned, in 1812, as a lieutenant of the Chevalier Guard. He retired in 1816 and lived thereafter in St. Petersburg, being prohibited by the authorities from permanently settling in Georgia.

Within Russia, Okropir and his cousin Prince Dimitri, son of Iulon, were principal leaders of Georgian royalists; they held gatherings of Georgian students at Moscow and Saint Petersburg, and tried to convince them that Georgia should be independent. Okropir clandestinely visited Tbilisi in 1830, and helped to found a secret society with the aim of restoring an independent kingdom under the Bagrationi dynasty. The society included many leading Georgian nobles and intellectuals, among them Elizbar Eristavi, Philadelphos Kiknadze, Solomon Dodashvili, Dimitri Kipiani, Giorgi Eristavi, Alexander Chavchavadze, Grigol Orbeliani, and Iase Palavandishvili who subsequently betrayed his numbers. On December 10, 1832, a few days before the planned coup, the conspirators were arrested. Okropir was exiled to Kostroma in 1833, but was soon pardoned and allowed to return to Moscow where he died in 1857.

== Family ==
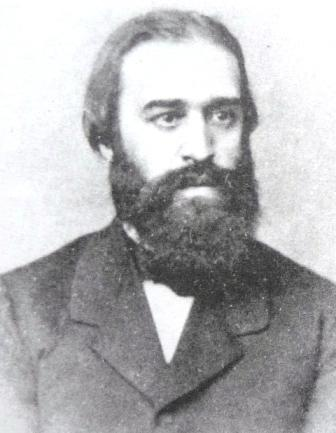
Prince Pavel Gruzinsky, son of Prince Okropir.

Prince Okropir was married to Countess Anna Pavlovna Kutaisova (1800-1868). Okropir fathered three sons and two daughters—Princes and Princesses Gruzinsky (i.e., "of Georgia") — who were granted by the Russian emperor the style of His/Her Serene Highness.

1. Prince Giorgi (Georgy Okropirovich Gruzinsky; c. 1834 – 28 February 1886), who died unmarried.
2. Princess Ana (Anna Okropirovna Gruzinskaya; c. 1834 – 18 June 1898), who was married firstly to Prince Alexander Bagration-Mukhransky (1823–1853), of the House of Mukhrani, and secondly to Alexander Albizzi.
3. Prince Pavle (Pavel Okropirovich Gruzinsky; 26 April 1835 – 12 February 1875), whose petition resulted in the imperial confirmation of the Gruzinsky coat of arms in 1886. He married in 1861 Princess Anastasia Nikolayevna Dolgorukova (1842–1881), by whom he had four sons and one daughter:
  1. Prince Giorgi (Georgy Pavlovich Gruzinsky; 16 May 1862 – 3 November 1916),
  2. Prince Konstantine (Konstantin Pavlovich Gruzinsky; 1871–1916),
  3. Prince Pavle (Pavel Pavlovich Gruzinsky; 1871–1884),
  4. Prince Dimitri (Dmitry Pavlovich Gruzinsky; c. 1873 – died in infancy),
  5. Princess Nino (Nina Pavlovna Gruzinskaya; born 1867).
4. Prince Irakli (Irakly Okropirovich Gruzinsky).
5. Princess Praskovia (Praskovia Okropirovna Gruzinskaya), possibly an extramarital child.

== Ancestry ==
Ancestors of Prince Okropir of Georgia

16. Heraclius I of Kakheti
8. Teimuraz II
17. Ana Cholokashvili
4. Heraclius II of Georgia
18. Vakhtang VI
9. Tamar of Kartli
19. Rusudan of Circassia
2. George XII
20. Zurab Abashidze
10. Zaal Abashidze
5. Anna Abashidze
1. Ilia
12. Vakhtang Tsitsishvili
6. Giorgi Tsitsishvili
3. Mariam Tsitsishvili
14. Giorgi Guramishvili
7. Elene Guramishvili
