= Anton II of Georgia =

Georgian king

Saint Anton II of Georgia
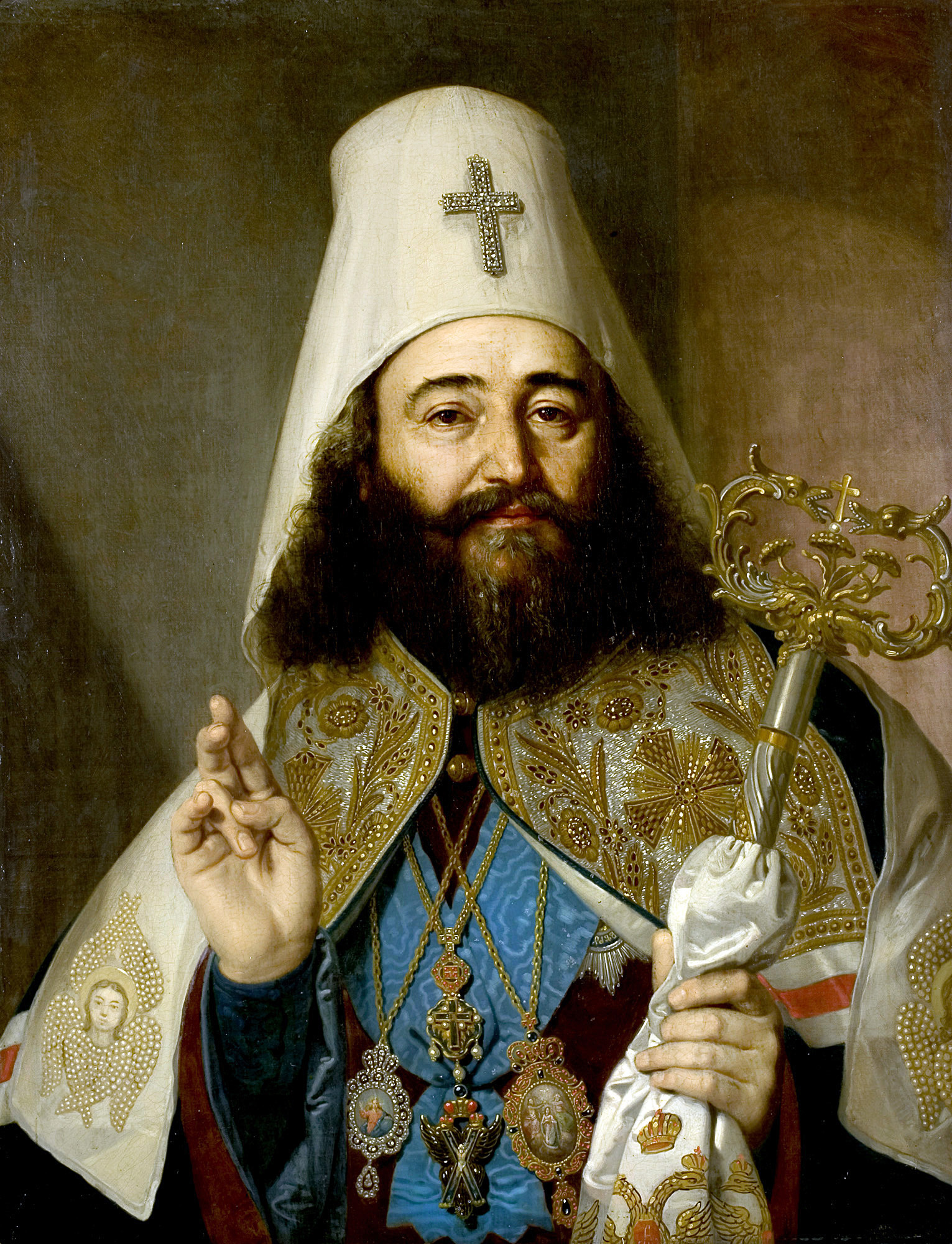
- Patriarch Anton II by Vladimir Borovikovsky, now on display at the Tretyakov Gallery

Great Martyr
- Born: 8 January 1762/1763
- Died: 21 December 1827; Nizhny Novgorod, Russia
- Venerated in: Eastern Orthodox Church
- Canonized: 11 July 2011 by Georgian Orthodox Church
- Feast: December 21

St. Anton II of Georgia

Catholicos Patriarch of Georgia
- Tenure: 1788–1811
- Predecessor: Anton I of Georgia
- Successor: Office abolished by the Russian Empire
- Dynasty: Bagrationi dynasty
- Father: Heraclius II of Georgia
- Mother: Darejan Dadiani
- Religion: Georgian Orthodox Church
- Khelrtva

Anton II the Great Martyr (Georgian: ანტონ II), born Prince Royal Teimuraz (თეიმურაზ ბატონიშვილი), (8 January 1762 or 1763 – 21 December 1827) was a member of the Georgian royal family and churchman. A son of Heraclius II, the penultimate King of Kartli and Kakheti, he was the Catholicos Patriarch of Georgia from 1788 to 1811.

After the Russian Empire annexed Georgia in 1801, Anton resisted the encroachments from the Imperial officials in the Georgian church affairs. Eventually, Anton was forced to leave Georgia for St. Petersburg in 1810 and stripped of his office in 1811. He was, thus, the last Georgian catholicos patriarch in the 19th century; the title was abolished by the Russian Empire and the autocephalous Georgian Orthodox Church was reduced to an exarchate of the Russian Orthodox Church. Anton spent his last years in retirement in Nizhny Novgorod, where he died in 1827. He was canonized by the Georgian church in 2011.

== Early life ==
Anton II was born as Prince Royal (batonishvili) Teimuraz, so named after his paternal grandfather King Teimuraz II. He was born of Heraclius II's third marriage to Darejan Dadiani. The young prince was educated at the royal court at Tbilisi and then at the Tbilisi Theological Seminary under the guidance of Anton I, his relative and predecessor as Catholicos Patriarch of Georgia. In 1782, he made his monastic profession and took the name Anton.

On the conclusion of the treaty of Georgievsk between Heraclius II and the Russian empress Catherine II in 1783, Anton, now a hierodeacon, and his brother Mirian journeyed to Saint Petersburg and were attached to the imperial court. Mirian entered the Russian military service, while Anton, in the presence of the empress Catherine and her suite, was consecrated as a metropolitan bishop at a ceremony held at the church of Tsarskoye Selo in 1787. On this occasion, Catherine presented him the richly adorned panagia, a medallion depicting the Virgin Mary, which would be appropriated by the Russian Most Holy Synod upon Anton II's death in 1827.

== Catholicos Patriarch ==
Anton's dioceses, first Ninotsminda and then Alaverdi, were both located in his native Kakheti, but Anton remained in Russia for a year. In 1788, his father, Heraclius II, indignant at Russia's refusal to maintain its troops in protection of Georgia as envisaged by the 1783 treaty, instructed Anton to come back to Georgia. That same year, he succeeded, at the age of 25, as the Catholicos Patriarch of Georgia on the death of Anton I. Anton's enthusiasm for religious building and patronage of education combined with his provenance added to his prestige of a religious leader. In 1791, he helped bring about the temporary reconciliation in western Georgia between his sisterly nephew King Solomon II of Imereti and his rival David II.

At the time when Anton became the catholicos, the Georgian Orthodox Church had been split into two separate patriarchates along the political divide, one for eastern Georgia and one for western Georgia. The leader of the latter, Maxim II, Catholicos-Patriarch of Imereti and Abkhazia, retired to Kiev in 1795. As no successor was elected to succeed him, Anton II was left as the sole primate for the Georgian church.

== Arrival of Russian rule ==
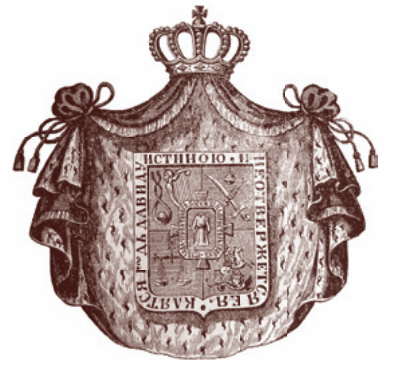
Coat of arms of Anton II

After the Russian Empire annexed Georgia in 1801 and began deporting the Georgian royal family to Russia proper, Anton came under increasing pressure from the Imperial officials. While Anton never openly retracted his loyalty to the Russian tsar, the Russian administration was anxious of the patriarch's refusal to surrender any of his privileges and his zealous defense of the old Georgian church traditions and laws. His response to the Russian efforts to bring the Georgian church in line with the new regime relied on the arguments that the laws and traditional customs in Georgia were hundreds of years old, predating Russian models, and the decrees of Alexander I of Russia had confirmed the independence of the Georgian Church.

The questions were also raised about Anton's links to anti-Russian members of the royal family, such as his brothers, Iulon and Alexander, and Iulon's son Levan. As early as in January 1801, the Russian commander Ivan Lazarev demanded in a latter sent to Anton II that the Georgian clergy ceased affording to Prince Royal Iulon a royal title in church services.

As external pressure mounted, Anton also had to deal with an internal division within the church. The intrigues, notably involving the metropolitan bishop Arsen of Tbilisi, were a frequent matter of correspondence between Tbilisi and St. Petersburg to the point that the Russian commander in Georgia, General Alexander Tormasov, rhetorically asked whether the church could be ruled by such clergy. Anton convened a church court which ruled that Arsen violated the canon by his misconduct and corruption and that he should be stripped of his office and retire to a remote convent, but the defiant bishop denied all charges and vehemently refused to leave his diocese, pending the decision in the imperial capital.

== Deposition ==
To try to convince the Catholicos-Patriarch to accommodate the imperial demands, the Russian officials mounted pressure on Anton to travel to St. Petersburg. Anton declined invitation by the lay procurator of the Russian Holy Synod, Prince Alexander N. Golitsyn, of 6 November 1809, on grounds of ill-health, but the requests became more insistent after General Tormasov received intelligence that Anton's rebel nephew Levan, with his Ossetian bands, was preparing to seize the catholicos. On 3 November 1810, having conducted his last service at the cathedral of Mtskheta, Anton was escorted by the Russian military to Russia. With this, no member of the former Georgian royal family remained in any position of authority in Tbilisi.

After his arrival in St. Petersburg, Anton was unilaterally removed from his office by the Imperial decree of 11 July 1811. The Georgian patriarchate was abolished and substituted with an exarchate of the Russian Orthodox Church. To lessen the impact of the loss of independence, the Russian government appointed as the first exarch a Georgian, Varlaam Eristavi, who was relieved of his duties in 1817 due to his delays in implementing new policies. From that year until the restoration of Georgian autocephalous church in 1917, all subsequent exarchs of Georgia were to be ethnic Russians appointed from St. Petersburg.

== Life and death in Russia ==
Discharged from the government of spiritual matters in Georgia and prohibited from returning to his homeland, Anton was decorated with the Order of St. Andrew and offered a pension of 2,675 silver roubles. In 1811, Anton, at his own request, was moved to Moscow, but in 1812 he was evacuated to Tambov due to Napoleon's occupation of Moscow. He returned to St. Petersburg in 1819, but chose in 1820 to move to the estate of his relative, Prince Georgy Gruzinsky, a descendant of Vakhtang VI, in Lyskovo. In 1824, Anton retired to a monastery in Nizhny Novgorod, where he died in 1827, bequeathing his property to his sisterly nephew and faithful companion, Prince Evstati Tsitsishvili. He was first interred at the Church of Joy of All Who Sorrow in Nizhny Novgorod and in 1841 reburied in the Church of the Transfiguration of the Nizhny Novgorod Kremlin. The church was demolished by the Soviet government in 1931 and the fate of Anton's grave is unknown.

== Canonization ==
On 11 July 2011, the Holy Synod of the Georgian Orthodox Church chaired by Catholicos Patriarch Ilia II canonized Anton II as a saint and Great Martyr. His feast day was set on 21 December (3 January, NS).

== Ancestry ==
Ancestors of Anton II of Georgia

16. Prince David of Kakheti
8. Heraclius I of Kakheti
17. Elene Diasamidze
4. Teimuraz II
18. Shermazan Cholokashvili
9. Ana Cholokashvili
2. Heraclius II of Georgia
20. Prince Levan of Kartli
10. Vakhtang VI
21. Tuta Gurieli
5. Tamar of Kartli
22. Kelchiko of Kabarda
11. Rusudan of Circassia
1. Anton (Teimuraz)
24. George IV Dadiani
12. Bezhan Dadiani
25. Sevdia Mikeladze
6. Katsia-Giorgi Dadiani
26. Gelovani
13. Tamar Gelovani
3. Darejan Dadiani

== Notes ==
Eastern Orthodox Church titles
Preceded by Anton I	Catholicos Patriarch of Georgia; 1788–1811	Succeeded by Office abolished by the Russian Empire
