= Irakli Gruzinsky =

Georgian prince (1826–1882)

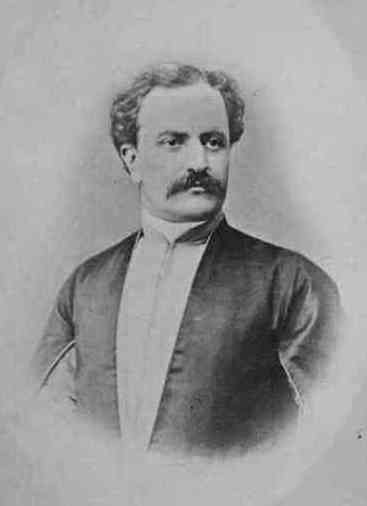
- Born: 18 August 1826; Erivan, Persian Empire
- Died: 27 April 1882 (aged 55); Paris, France
- Spouse: Tamar Chavchavadze
- Issue: Elizabeth; Ekaterina; Mariam; Alexander
- Dynasty: Bagrationi
- Father: Prince Alexander of Georgia
- Mother: Mariam Melik-Aghamalyan

Irakli Gruzinsky (Georgian: ირაკლი გრუზინსკი; Russian: Ираклий Александрович Грузинский, Irakly Aleksandrovich Gruzinsky; 18 August 1826 – 27 April 1882) was a Georgian prince belonging to the Bagrationi dynasty and a colonel in the Russian Imperial army. He was a grandson of King Heraclius II of Georgia, and the son of Prince Alexander, a staunch opponent of the Russian possession of Georgia.

== Early life ==
Prince Irakli was born in 1826 in Erivan, Armenia, which was then part of the Persian Empire. His father, Alexander, had left his homeland in 1800 and had since been trying to overthrow the Russian regime in Georgia. Irakli's mother was Mariam, daughter of Sahak Melik-Aghamalyan, the influential Armenian dignitary of Erivan. Soon after Irakli's birth, Erivan was taken by the Russian army in the course of the Russo-Persian war of 1826–1828, which occasioned Alexander's separation with his family. Mariam and Irakli lived in Erivan until 1834, when they were moved by the Russian government to Saint Petersburg, where Irakli received his military training, first at the Alexandrovsky Military College and then the Page Corps.

== Career ==
Prince Irakli saw his first promotion to lieutenant in 1845 for his conduct during the expedition against the Lezgins in the Caucasian War, a year after his father died in exile in Tabriz. He was transferred to the Regiment of Mounted Grenadiers in 1852 and retired with the rank of colonel in 1855. He rejoined the Caucasian Army in 1858, but retired shortly thereafter due to failing health. He was recognized in the title of Prince (knyaz) Gruzinsky, literally, "of Georgia", in 1833 and granted the style of Serene Highness, for himself and his male-line descendants in 1865. He was an object of romantic affection of Bertha von Suttner, an Austrian novelist and the first woman to become a Nobel Peace Prize laureate, but Prince Irakli did not reciprocate. Years later, von Suttner befriended Irakli's young wife Tamara, with whom she stayed during her visits to Tbilisi and Paris. Prince Irakli died in Paris aged 56 and was buried at the Svetitskhoveli Cathedral in Georgia.

== Family ==
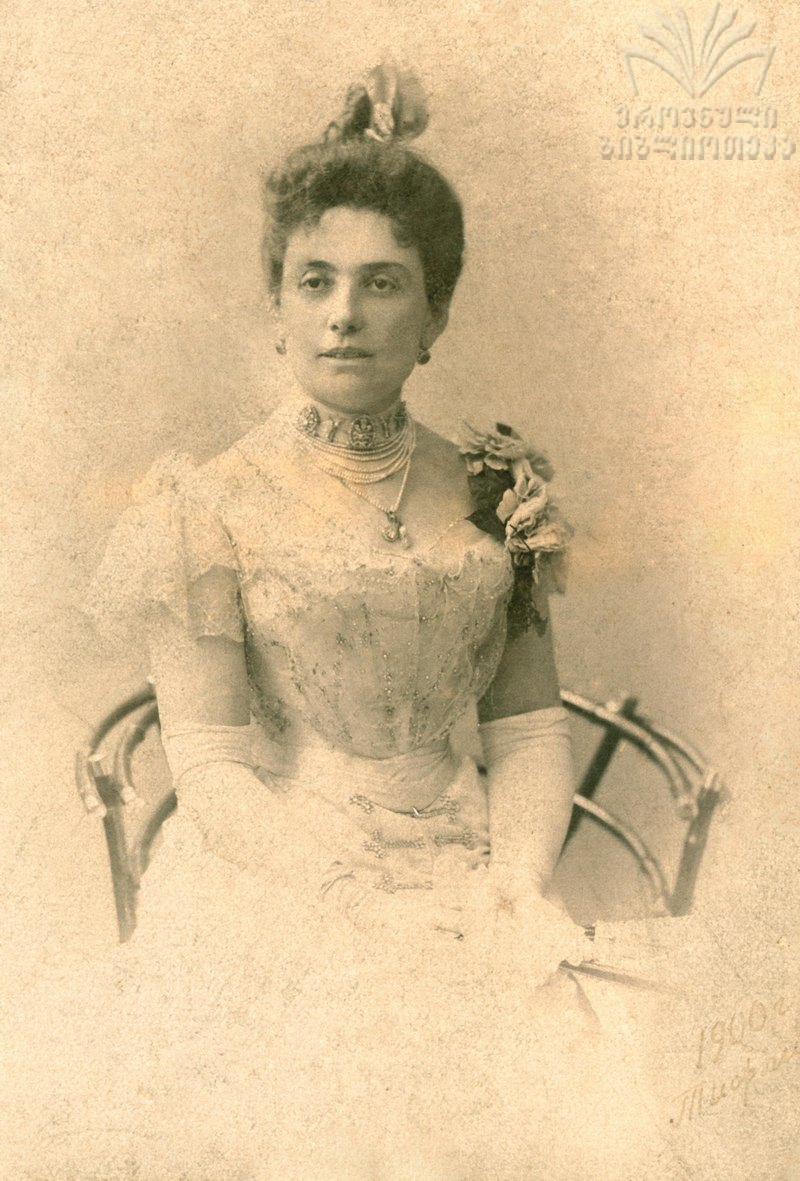
Wife of Gruzinsky, Tamara Chavchavadze, who was once held captive by Chechen rebels

Prince Irakli was married to Tamara (24 January 1852 – 1933), daughter of the Georgian Prince David Chavchavadze, who was a Lieutenant General in the imperial army. She was a lady of honour to the Empress of Russia, as well as a prominent socialite and philanthropist. She first became known to the larger public at the age of two when she was part of the Chavchavadze family abducted and held in captivity for ten months by Imam Shamil's men in 1854 during the Crimean War.

Of the couple's four children only two daughters survived into adulthood:

- Elizabeth (1870–1942), a journalist and translator from Georgian and Russian into French, also known by her penname Sazandari; she was married to Prince Mamuka Orbeliani (died 1924);
- Ekaterina (1872–1917), who was married to Prince Ivan Ratiev, known for his protection of the imperial treasure of the Winter Palace during the October Revolution in 1917;
- Mariam (1875–1877), who died young;
- Alexander (1878–1879), who died young.

== Ancestry ==
Ancestors of Irakli Gruzinsky

16. Heraclius I of Kakheti
8. Teimuraz II
17. Ana Cholokashvili
4. Heraclius II of Georgia
18. Vakhtang VI
9. Tamar of Kartli
19. Rusudan of Circassia
2. Prince Alexander
20. Bezhan Dadiani
10. Katsia-Giorgi Dadiani
21. Tamar Gelovani
5. Darejan Dadiani
1. Irakli
6. Sahak Melik-Aghamalyan
3. Mariam Melik-Aghamalyan
