= Prince Alexander of Georgia =

Prince Royal of Georgia

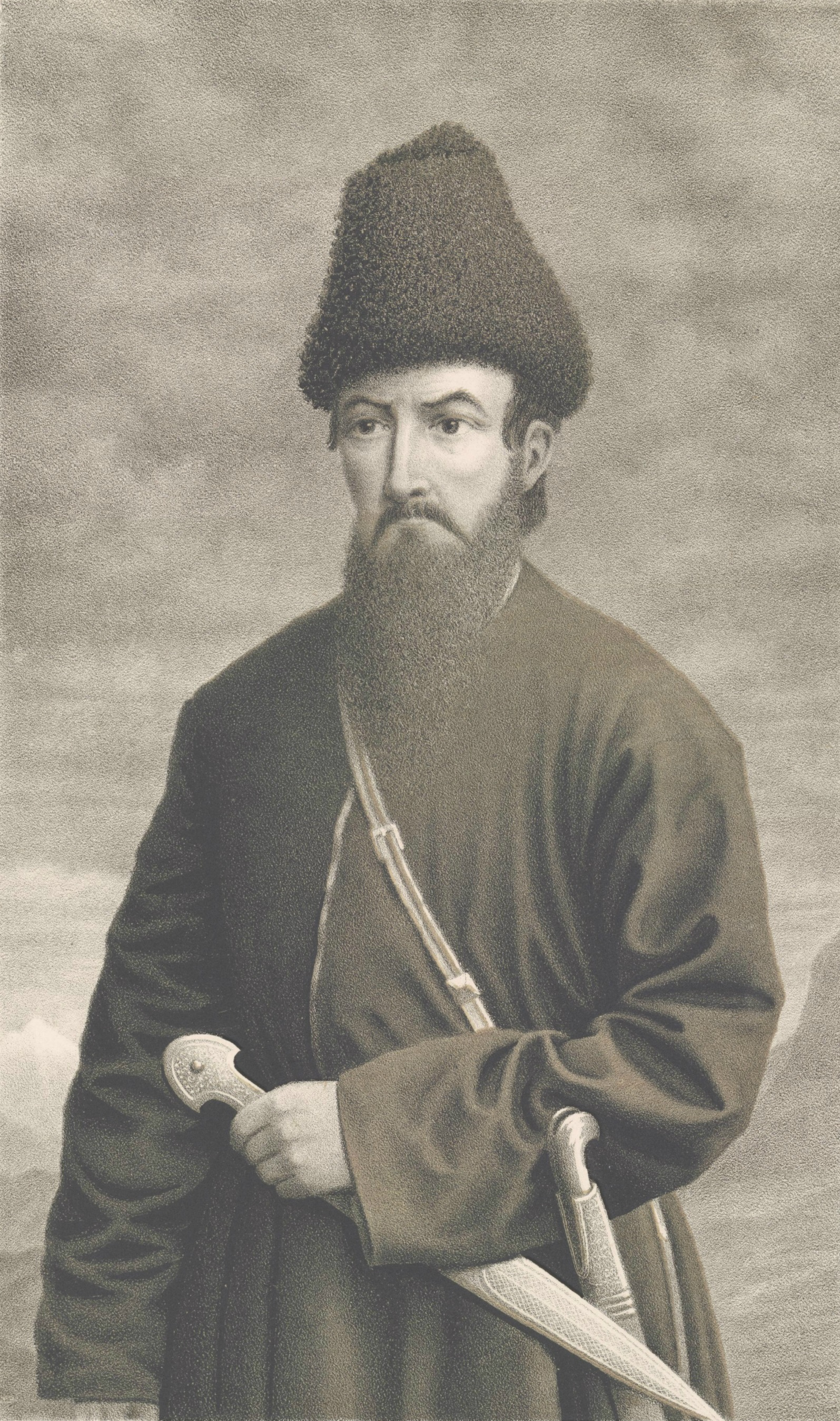
- Born: 1770; Kingdom of Kartli-Kakheti
- Died: 1844 (aged 73–74); Tehran, Qajar Iran
- Burial: Saints Thaddeus and Bartholomew Church of Tehran
- Spouse: Mariam Aghamalyan
- Issue: Elizabeth; Irakli
- Dynasty: Bagrationi
- Father: Heraclius II of Georgia
- Mother: Darejan Dadiani
- Religion: Georgian Orthodox Church

Alexander (Georgian: ალექსანდრე ბატონიშვილი, romanized: aleksandre bat'onishvili; 1770–1844) was a Georgian royal prince (batonishvili) of the Bagrationi dynasty, who headed several insurrections against the Russian rule in Georgia. He was known as Eskandar Mīrzā (اسکندرمیرزا) in Persia, tsarevich Aleksandr Irakliyevich (Царевич Александр Ираклиевич) in Russia, and Alexander Mirza in Western Europe.

Alexander was a son of Heraclius II of Georgia, who entrusted him various military and administrative tasks. After the death of Heraclius in 1798, he opposed the accession of his half-brother George XII and the new king's renewed quest for Russian protection. After the Russian annexation of Georgia in 1801, Alexander fled the country and spent decades in a series of attempts to undermine the Russian control of his homeland. Eventually, Alexander's reliance on Persian support and North Caucasian mercenaries deprived him of popular support. After his last major rebellion was defeated in 1812, Alexander permanently settled in Persia, where he died in obscurity in 1844.

== Early life ==
Alexander was a son of Heraclius II, king of Kartli-Kakheti in eastern Georgia, and his third wife Darejan Dadiani. He was educated by the Catholic missionaries at the court of his father. At age 12 or 13, he was tutored by and served as an aide to the Tbilisi-based German adventurer and physician Jacob Reineggs, who played a role in the Russian–Georgian diplomacy until his retirement to the Russian Empire in 1783. Alexander became involved in the politics and administration of his country at a very young age. In 1793, he was entrusted by Heraclius with the government of the district of Qazakh and in 1794 he was invested with the appanage in Somkhiti. Around the same time, Alexander was present with the army sent by Heraclius in support of his grandson, King Solomon II of Imereti, against his rival David II. In 1795, Alexander led a Georgian contingent dispatched to help the allied Ibrahim Khalil Khan of Karabakh against the Iranian encroachment. In June, the allies fought back a 20,000-strong force sent by Agha Mohammad Khan Qajar against Karabakh. Back in Georgia, in July 1795, Alexander raised a force of Turkic mercenaries brought from Karabakh against the anticipated Iranian advance. Fighting by his father's side, Alexander witnessed the sack of Tbilisi in a disastrous attack by Agha Mohammad Khan Qajar, who resented Heraclius's rapprochement with the Russian Empire and demanded Georgia's reversal to traditional allegiance to Iran. Disappointed by his failure, Heraclius, then over 75, retired to his native Telavi, leaving Alexander in charge of restoring Tiflis.

== Break with George XII ==
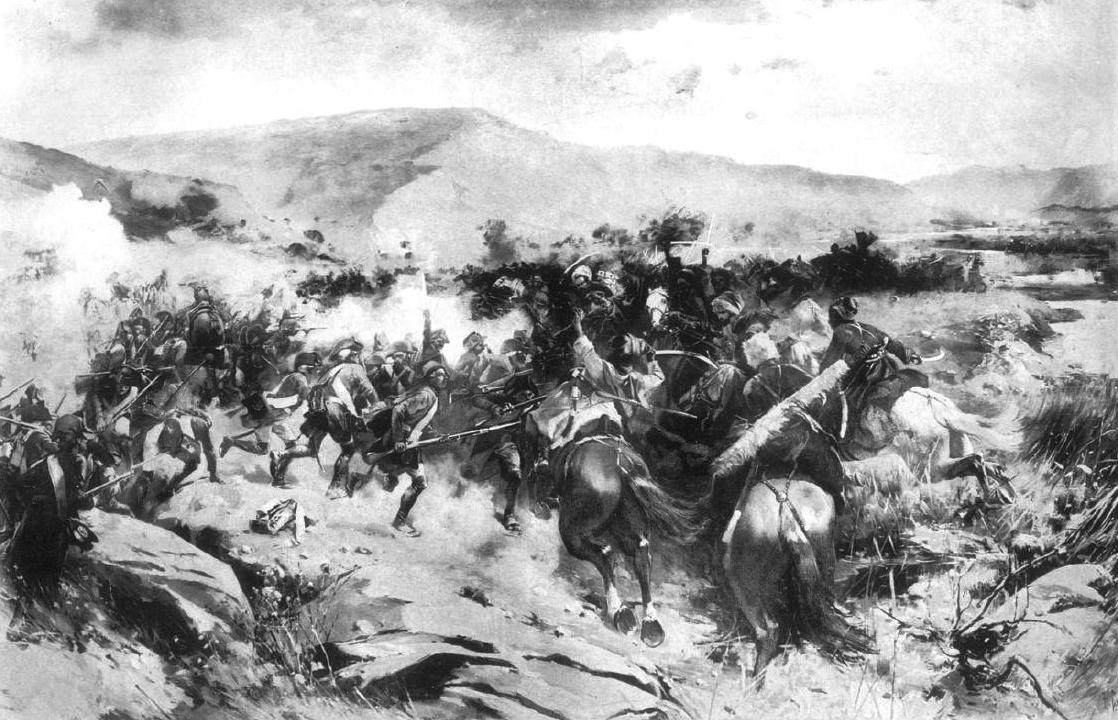
The battle on the Iori in 1800

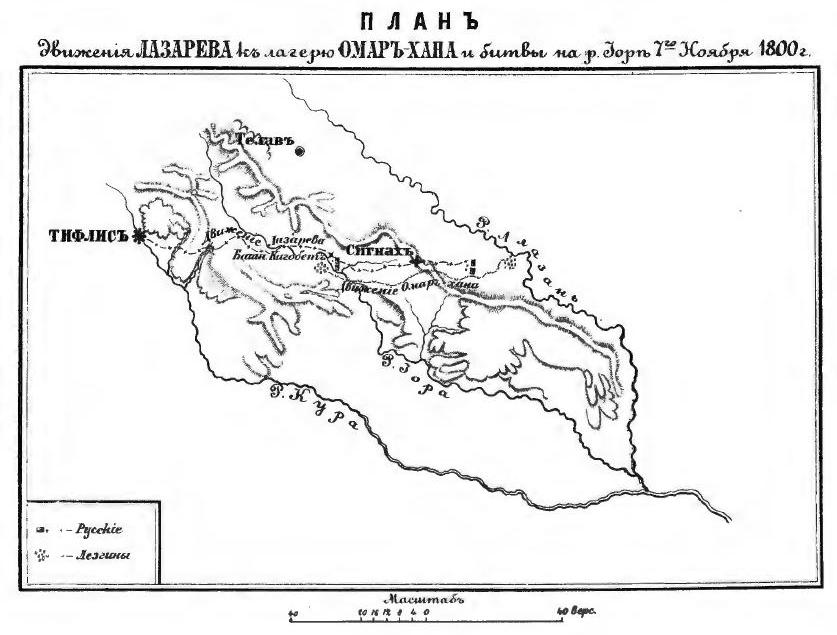
Map of the campaign in Kakheti, 1800

After the death of Heraclius in 1798, Alexander, together with his mother Darejan and brother Iulon, led opposition to the accession of his half-brother, George XII. The conflict between the sons of Heraclius had already been brewing during their father's lifetime, and now evolved into an open confrontation. Alexander occupied the Muslim-majority districts of Qazakh, Borchalo, and Shamshadil, and refused to obey the new king. Being in ill-health and weakened, George XII relied on the Russian protection. Alexander, suspecting that the Russian presence in the country would eventually lead to an outright annexation, was persuaded by the shah of Iran, Fath-Ali Shah Qajar, to leave Georgia and join his forces with Umma Khan, the ruler of Avar Khanate in Dagestan and an erstwhile enemy of Heraclius II, in 1799.

Fath-Ali rewarded Alexander's defection by promising to support his claim to the Georgian throne. Alexander began raising an army and issued an appeal to the people of Kartli-Kakheti, trying to justify his new alliance with the traditional foes of the Georgians and swearing by the grave of Saint Nino that the Avar army was being assembled not to ravage the country, but to defend Alexander's right to the throne. At the same time, he sent letters to his mother and brothers, assuring that they would be saved from the Russian oppression.

In November 1800, Alexander and Umma Khan led their forces into Kakheti, but they were met and decisively defeated by a combined Russo-Georgian army in the Battle of Niakhura on 7 November 1800. Wounded in action, Umma Khan retreated to the mountains of Dagestan, while Alexander and his followers fled to Ibrahim Khalil Khan of Karabakh, and then to Dagestan. In the meantime, the defeat of his allies convinced Fath-Ali not to proceed with his planned invasion of Georgia and he recalled his army to Tabriz. Declared by the Russians a traitor to be taken dead or alive, Alexander thus began three decades of resistance.

== Struggle against Russia ==
=== Russo-Persian war (1804–1813) ===
After King George XII's death in December 1800, the Russian government prevented his heir Prince David from assuming the throne and brought Kartli-Kakheti more closely under its control. On 12 September 1801, Emperor Alexander I of Russia issued a manifesto, declaring the Georgian monarchy abolished and imposing a Russian administration. As the Russians began deporting the Georgian royal family members to Russia proper, many princes openly revolted. Alexander's brothers, Iulon and Parnaoz, fled to Solomon II, King of Imereti in western Georgia, while his half-nephew Teimuraz, a son of the late king George XII and the future historian, joined him in Dagestan.

In 1803, Alexander attempted to win over the newly appointed Russian commander in Georgia, Prince Pavel Tsitsianov, of Georgian descent. In a warm letter sent to Tsitsianov, Alexander rejoiced in the fact that a "son of the Georgian soil" had been appointed as a commander and promised reconciliation provided the Georgian kingship was restored under the Russian protectorate. In response, Tsistianov, a loyal servant of the Russian Empire who saw no future for Georgia apart from Russia, sent General Vasily Gulyakov to the conquest of Jar-Balakan, the mountainous communities sheltering Alexander and Teimuraz. Both fled to Tabriz and joined the ranks of the reformed Persian army, Alexander as a senior adviser to the Crown Prince Abbas Mirza and Teimuraz as a commander of artillery. As tensions were mounting along the Caucasus frontier, Alexander, along with Pir Qoli Khan Qajar, was placed at the head of a Persian force in Ganja. When the Russo-Persian war broke out openly in June 1804, the Persian army under Abbas Mirza and Alexander fought the Russian troops inconclusively at Echmiadzin on 20 June 1804 and then successfully defended Erivan, forcing General Tsitsianov to withdraw back in Georgia in September 1804. At the same time, Alexander sent letters to all principal dignitaries in Georgia as well as the rebellious Georgian and Ossetian highlanders, promising them that he would be arriving with Persian armies to end the Russian rule.

In 1810, Alexander joined the combined Persian-Ottoman venture of invasion of Georgia, also supported by Solomon II, the fugitive king of Imereti, and Levan, Alexander's nephew. However, the Ottoman mobilization was delayed and a Persian force was dispersed in a surprise nighttime attack by the Russians near Akhalkalaki in September 1810. Barely escaping from captivity, Alexander fell back to Tabriz and Solomon retired to Trabzon, where he, the last reigning Georgian king, died in 1815. Alexander's disillusioned nephew Teimuraz, prompted by his tutor the poet Petre Laradze, escaped from the Persian camp and surrendered to the Russian authorities.

=== Rebellion in Kakheti ===
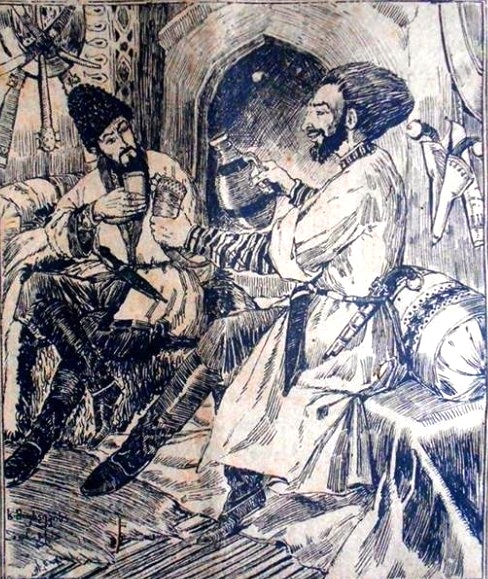
Umma Khan of Avary hosting Prince Alexander as imagined by the artist Khalil-Bek Musayasul (1897–1949).

In September 1812, Alexander crossed into Kakheti with some 100 followers to invigorate an anti-Russian movement in the region. His force of Georgian rebels and Dagestani auxiliaries fought a series of engagements with the Russian troops until its final defeat at the hands of General Dimitri Orbeliani in November 1812. In the meantime, in October 1812, General Pyotr Kotlyarevsky decisively defeated Abbas Mirza's attempt to advance towards Georgia in the battle of Aslanduz. According to the British officer William Monteith, who knew Alexander personally and accompanied him during his raid into Georgia, the rebellious prince, finding it impossible to raise the means of paying his Lezgin auxiliaries, had to consent to their carrying of Georgian slaves. As a result, Alexander's army was disbanded and he fled to the Khevsur highlanders. The Russians under General Stahl proceeded with ravaging the Khevsur villages, putting Alexander into flight to the Avars and other mountainous tribes of the Caucasus. The Russian authorities vainly pressured the mountaineers into surrendering the fugitive prince; they evinced toward him, in the words of Monteith, "a fidelity equal to that of the Highlanders towards Charles Edward under similar circumstances after the battle of Culloden."

Alexander's association with the Avars gave origin to a legend widespread in the area in the 19th century, according to which Imam Shamil, the future leader of Caucasian resistance to the Russian expansion, was his natural son. Apollon Runovsky, an officer in charge of Shamil in captivity at Kaluga, claimed in his diaries that Shamil himself forged this legend in an attempt to win the support of Georgian highlanders.

=== Life in Persia ===
In spite of a thorough Russian search, in September 1818, Alexander fought his way to Akhaltsikhe in the Ottoman territory. The Russian commander-in-chief Aleksey Yermolov wanted Alexander if not alive, then dead so as to have his remains interred "with some honors" in Tiflis and preclude “all sorts of concoctions”. Pursuant to Yermolov's instructions, General Veliyaminov avoided directly encroaching on an Ottoman or Persian territory to kill Alexander so as not to tarnish Russia's image "in the eyes of all Europe", but authorized Colonel Ladinsky to bribe Alexander's Turkish companions or local guides to murder the prince. All these efforts failed and, after months of delay by the local Ottoman authorities, Alexander managed to safely reach Persia in January 1819.

The shah gave Alexander a pension and possession of some Armenian-populated villages in Salmas. With the help of his friend, Crown Prince Abbas Mirza, and the Armenian Catholicos Ephraim, Alexander married Mariam, a daughter of Sahak Aghamalyan, the secular chief (melik) of the Armenians of the Erivan Khanate. Both Alexander and the Persian government hoped that this marriage would secure Armenian support against the Russians. During his refuge life in Persia, Alexander maintained contacts with the European diplomats and travelers. Among these was the Jewish Christian missionary Joseph Wolff, whom Alexander met at his estate in Khosrova. The prince served to Wolff as a source of information about the genealogy of the Bagrationi dynasty, including a claim of descent from David, and the presence of the Jews in Georgia.

Sir Robert Ker Porter, who saw Alexander in Tabriz in 1819 and noted his "bold independence of spirit" and irreconcilability to the Russian possession of Georgia, compared the refuge prince to "the royal lion hunted from his hereditary waste, yet still returning to hover near, and roar in proud loneliness of his ceaseless threatening to the human strangers who had disturbed his reign". William Monteith recalled that Alexander "never showed any pride of birth, nor did he gave way to useless regrets for the loss of his fortune and princely dignity, though he had no hesitation in talking of his adventures, or giving any information that was asked for concerning them."

The problem of protection offered by Iran to Alexander was one of the main points at issue during the ambassadorial mission of Semyon I. Mazarovich, sent in 1819 by the Russian government to Iran as a permanent resident diplomatic mission, to which the young poet Alexander Griboyedov was also attached.

=== Russo-Persian War (1826–1828) ===
Alexander continued his efforts to foment anti-Russian revolts in various provinces of Georgia. During the Russo-Persian war of 1826–1828, he was in the Char community, trying to mobilize the local clans for a planned invasion of Kakheti, which failed to materialize. A report in The Asiatic Journal from that period noted that Alexander, "one of the principal refugee chiefs" in Iran and "a man of an enterprize", had lost confidence among the Georgians who were suspicious of his use of Dagestani auxiliaries and showed no "disposition to rise on the present occasion against their rulers."

In August 1826, according to the Russian commander Count Simonich, Alexander was staying in the camp of the Persian commander Sohrab Khan near Tovuz, in order to cause unrest in Kakheti. But, the Persian army was forced to flee due to the barrage of arrows and grenades of the Russian army. Thus, Alexander's plan to get into Kakheti was destroyed. Simonich describes him as a "restless man".

=== Later years ===
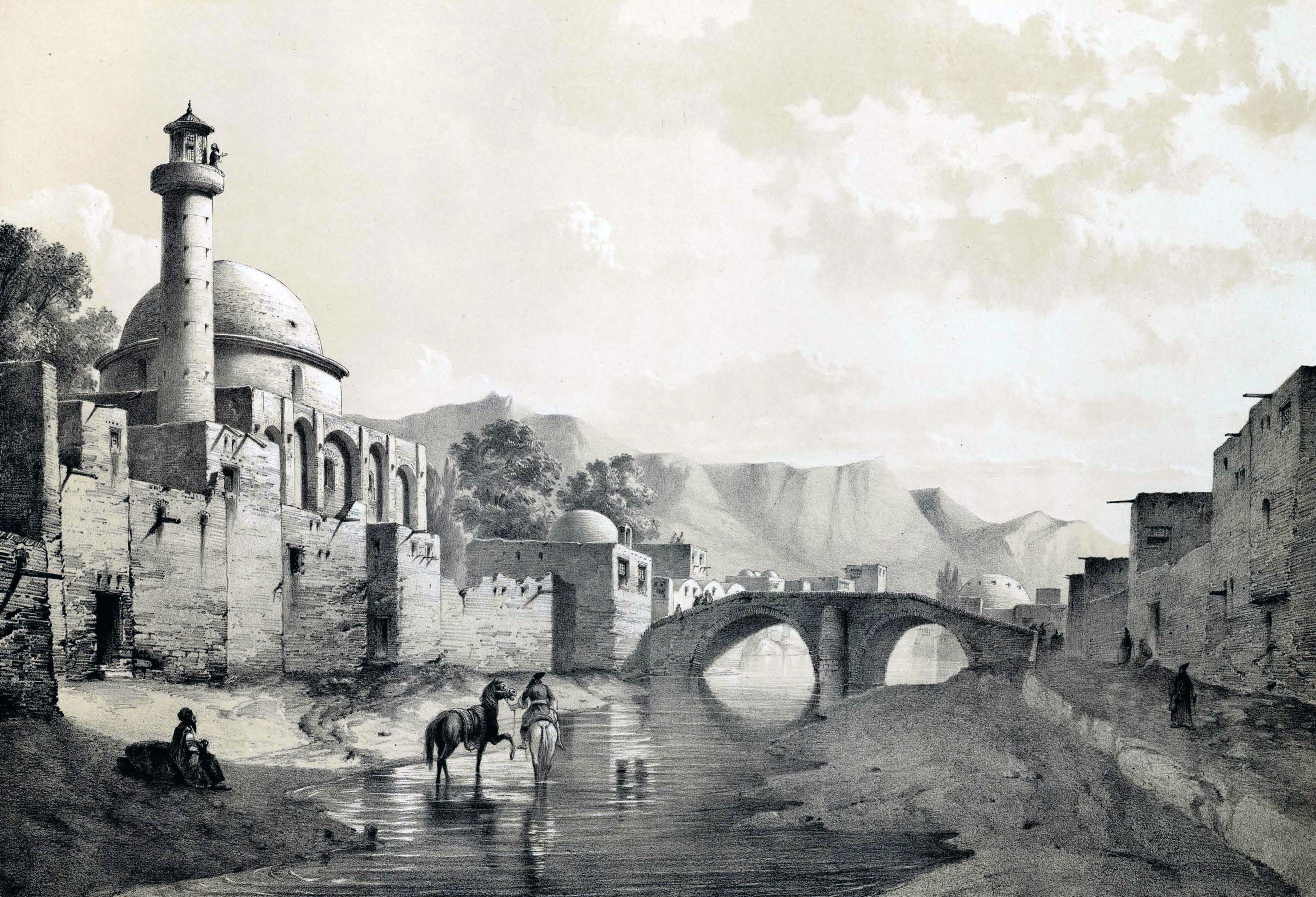
Tabriz in the 1840s

In 1832, a number of leading Georgian nobles and intellectuals plotted a coup against the Russian rule. According to their plan, the principal Russian officials were to be invited to a ball where they would be either arrested or killed. Then Alexander would be invited to assume the crown of Georgia, possibly as a constitutional monarch. Alexander corresponded with the conspirators and had his own agent among their numbers, but the prince considered himself too old to be directly involved and told the Georgians "to do what they liked". The plot was eventually betrayed and its leaders were rounded up by the Russian authorities. Having abandoned all hopes of returning to Georgia, Alexander continued to live as a private person and died in obscurity in Tehran in 1844. He was buried in the courtyard of St. Thaddeus and Bartholomew Armenian Church.

== Family and descendants ==
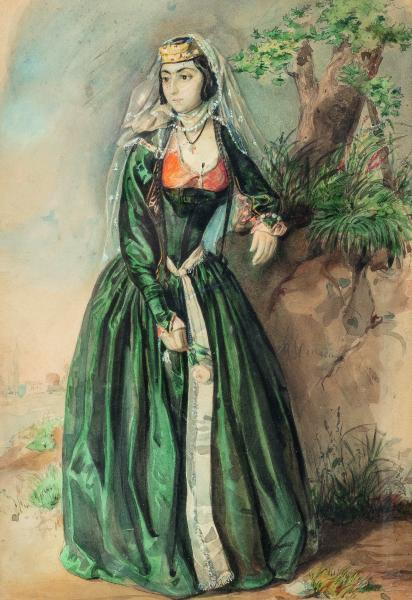
Princess Maria Aghamalyan, wife of Alexander. A painting by Giorgio Corradini, 1859.

Alexander had only one confirmed child, Prince Irakli (1826–1882), according to the Georgian Genealogical Society. Other sources, however, suggest that he also had a daughter, Princess Elizabeth (1821–1836).

=== First marriage (after 1790; to Nino, the Circassian; No child) ===
Alexander's first marriage is recorded with some variations in different sources. They all agree that some form of arrangement was made to marry Nino and that she died soon. However, some sources say he did not even see the girl, some say he was engaged to her, and some say that she died two years after marriage. From this marriage, no child is recorded in any of these sources.

In 1790, King Heraclius himself began making arrangements for Alexander to marry Nino, the daughter of a Circassian chief from Greater Kabarda, of the Muslim clan of Misostov. She was of rare beauty, and Heraclius chose her for his beloved Alexander. To make this arrangement, in 1790, Heraclius sent messengers to the prince of Kabarda, who was his relative. Heraclius was proud to strengthen the brotherhood and ties by this marriage. Then, the girl, also known as “the sun of Kabarda”, was brought in great luxury and love to the court of the glorious king in Tbilisi. She had to get used to the customs and rules of the family and palace etiquette, get suitable education in the palace, and then, when she had mastered the commandments of Christ, she had to read the holy scriptures, become a Christian, and change her name (the same path was followed by Queen Rusudan in 1696). Her original name is unknown, but she was given the name Nino at baptism. Unfortunately, the new bride Nino fell ill of a cold and died so suddenly and unexpectedly. Thus, Alexander never saw Nino due to her untimely death. This circumstance probably caused the whole palace to suffer and mourn, and the tender poet Mariam Batonishvili, Heraclius's daughter, expressed this mourning in a poem in Georgian which can be interpreted as:

"Kabardo was one sun shining brilliantly,
The daughter of the Circassian khans,
The King called her as a daughter-in-law, to beautify the court,
By the power of the Lord, she was created without blemish."

According to the Russian historian Petr Butkov (1775–1857), Alexander was engaged to the princess of the large Kabardian family of Misostov. She was already brought to Georgia, but died before marriage.

According to the British officer William Monteith, Alexander's Circassian wife died two years after her marriage. Monteith was involved in various missions in Persia during twenty years between 1810 and 1829; and he knew Alexander personally and accompanied him during two occasions of his raid into Georgia and his escape to Persia between 1810 and 1811. Monteith, however, raised concerns about effective communication with Alexander because conversations were through Alexander's secretary translating from Georgian to Turkish, in which Monteith could understand with some difficulty.

In 1811, Monteith described Alexander's character as someone with no romance, enterprise, or energy, which suggests that Alexander had no relationship after Nino's death until at least 1811.

=== Second marriage (in 1820; to Mariam Aghamalyan; Children: Elizabeth and Irakli) ===
Abbas Mirza invested in Alexander to ascend him to the Georgian throne and repeatedly raised concerns regarding Alexander's heir. Alexander, having no heir, did not think it was possible to prolong the case for a long time and decided to fulfill the wish of Abbas Mirza. He saw Mariam, Melik Sahak's daughter, and was immediately captivated by her beauty.

In 1820, on May 20, Alexander (age 50) married Mariam (12 August 1808 – 7 October 1882), the 12-year-old daughter of the Armenian dignitary Sahak Melik-Aghamalyan, in Etchmiadzin Cathedral, Erivan, Persia. The crown was placed on his already graying head. Abbas Mirza personally paid all the expenses for the marriage.

The Iranian governor of the Erivan Khanate, Hossein Khan Sardar, maintained good relations with Sahak and played an instrumental role in arranging the marriage. Through her mother, Mariam was a cousin of the prominent Armenian writer Khachatur Abovian.

At this time, Alexander's main residence was in the Armenian-populated district of Salmas in Azerbaijan, Persia.

In 1821, on July 13, Alexander's daughter, Princess Elizabeth, was born in Erivan, Persia to Mariam a month prior to her 13th birthday.

In 1826, on August 18, Alexander's son, Prince Irakli, was born in Erivan, Persia to Mariam a few days after her 18th birthday.

In 1827, Mariam together with their son, Irakli, settled in her native Erivan, which was soon conquered by Russia. This indicates that Alexander's family had a secondary residence which was in Erivan. However, Alexander together with Elizabeth managed to escape from being entrapped in Erivan unlike Mariam and Irakli.

In 1834, the Russian government ordered her to move to Saint Petersburg, where she was known as tsarevna Maria Isaakovna Gruzinskaya (Russian for "of Georgia") and lived on a state-granted pension until her death in 1882. Mariam's remains were moved to Tbilisi and interred there, at the northern wall of the Armenian Vank cathedral. After the demolition of the cathedral by the Soviet government in 1930, her marble gravestone with a trilingual Russian, Armenian, and Georgian epitaph was moved to the State Museum of the History of Georgia in Tiflis (now Tbilisi).

=== Children (Elizabeth and Irakli) ===
Alexander's son, Prince Irakli (18 August 1826 – 27 April 1882), pursued an officer's career in the Russian army. Irakli's only son of his marriage to Princess Tamar Chavchavadze, Alexander, died at the age of 2 in 1879. His daughters, Yelizaveta (1870–1942) and Yekaterina (1872–1917), were married to the princes Mamuka Orbeliani and Ivan Ratiev, respectively.

Alexander's daughter, Princess Elizabeth (13 July 1821 – 17 September 1836), was the second wife of Samson-Khan (Samson Yakovlevich Makintsev; 1770–1853), a Russian defector and a high-ranking commander in the Qajar army. Samson's son of this marriage, Jibrail-Khan, subsequently served as an aide-de-camp to Naser al-Din Shah Qajar.

== Ancestry ==
8. Heraclius I of Kakheti
4. Teimuraz II
9. Ana Cholokashvili
2. Heraclius II of Georgia
10. Vakhtang VI
5. Tamar of Kartli
11. Rusudan of Circassia
1. Alexander
12. Bezhan Dadiani
6. Katsia-Giorgi Dadiani
13. Tamar Gelovani
3. Darejan Dadiani

== See also ==
- Prince Teimuraz of Georgia
- Iranian Georgians
