= Georgia within the Russian Empire =

1801–1918 period of Georgian history

Coordinates: 41.7167°N 44.7833°E

The country of Georgia became part of the Russian Empire in the 19th century. Throughout the early modern period, the Muslim Ottoman and Persian empires had fought over various fragmented Georgian kingdoms and principalities; by the 18th century, Russia emerged as the new imperial power in the region. Since Russia was an Orthodox Christian state like Georgia, the Georgians increasingly sought Russian help. In 1783, Heraclius II of the eastern Georgian kingdom of Kartli-Kakheti forged an alliance with the Russian Empire, whereby the kingdom became a Russian protectorate and abjured any dependence on its suzerain Persia. The Russo-Georgian alliance, however, backfired as Russia was unwilling to fulfill the terms of the treaty, proceeding to annex the troubled kingdom in 1801, and reducing it to the status of a Russian region (Georgia Governorate). In 1810, the western Georgian kingdom of Imereti was annexed as well. Russian rule over Georgia was eventually acknowledged in various peace treaties with Persia and the Ottomans, and the remaining Georgian territories were absorbed by the Russian Empire in a piecemeal fashion in the course of the 19th century.

Until 1918, Georgia would be part of the Russian Empire. Russian rule offered the Georgians security from external threats, but it was also often heavy-handed and insensitive to locals. By the late 19th century, discontent with the Russian authorities led to a growing national movement. The Russian Imperial period, however, brought unprecedented social and economic change to Georgia, with new social classes emerging: the emancipation of the serfs freed many peasants but did little to alleviate their poverty; the growth of capitalism created an urban working class in Georgia. Both peasants and workers found expression for their discontent through revolts and strikes, culminating in the Revolution of 1905. Their cause was championed by the socialist Mensheviks, who became the dominant political force in Georgia in the final years of Russian rule. Georgia finally won its independence in 1918, less as a result of the nationalists' and socialists' efforts, than from the collapse of the Russian Empire in World War I.

== Background: Russo-Georgian relations before 1801 ==
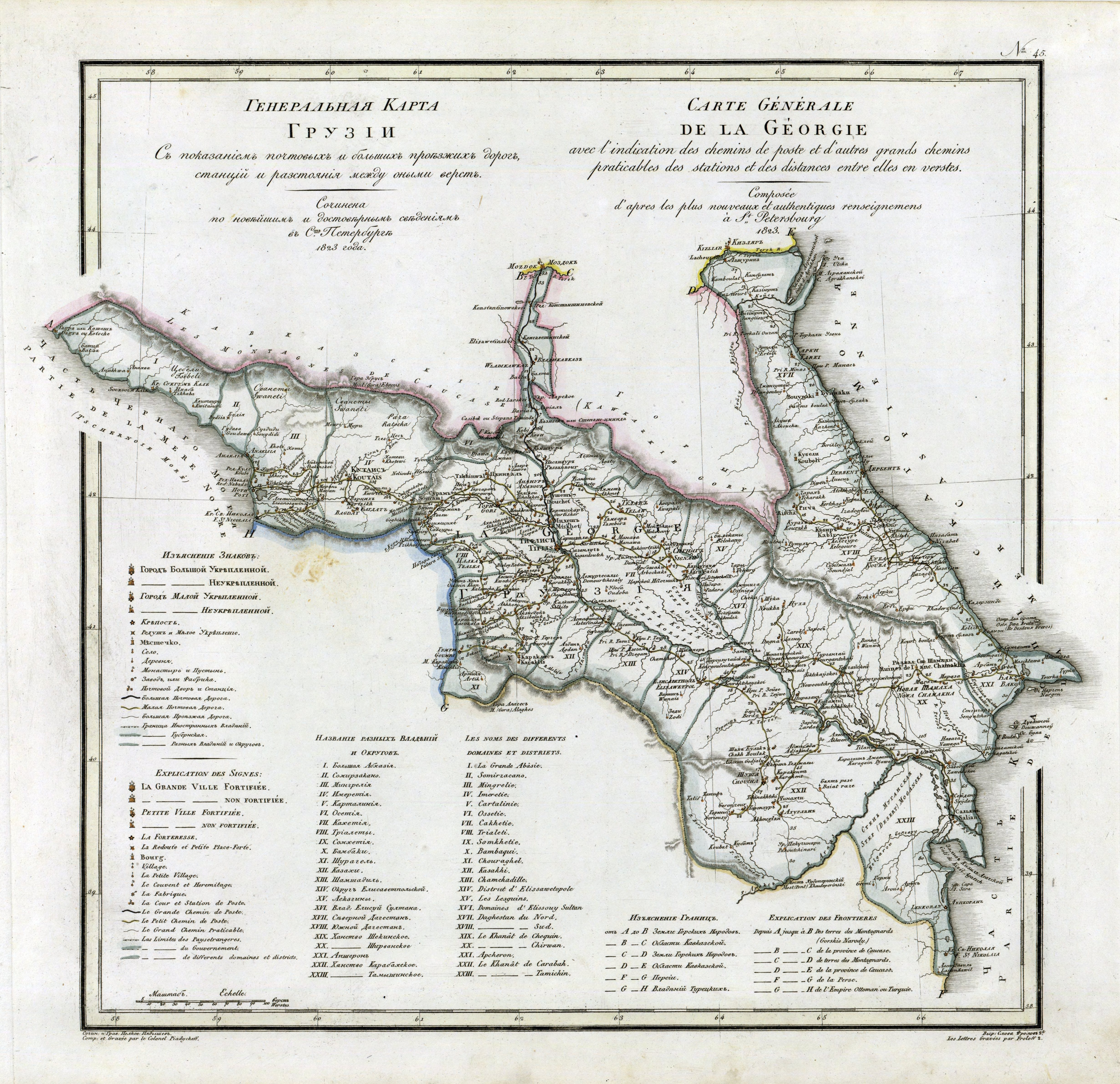
General map of Georgia by Colonel V.P. Piadyshev, 1823

By the 15th century, the Christian Kingdom of Georgia had become fractured into a series of smaller states which were fought over by the two great Muslim empires in the region, Ottoman Turkey and Safavid Persia. The Peace of Amasya of 1555 formally divided the lands of the south Caucasus into separate Ottoman and Persian spheres of influence. The Georgian Kingdom of Imereti and Principality of Samtskhe, as well as the lands along the Black Sea coast to its west were accorded to the Ottomans. To the east, the Georgian kingdoms of Kartli and Kakheti and various Muslim potentates along the Caspian Sea coast were subsumed under Persian control.

But during the second half of the century a third imperial power emerged to the north, namely the Russian state of Muscovy, which shared Georgia's Orthodox religion. Diplomatic contacts between the Georgian Kingdom of Kakheti and Moscow began in 1558 and in 1589, Tsar Fyodor I offered to put the kingdom under his protection. Yet little help was forthcoming and the Russians were still too remote from the south Caucasus region to challenge Ottoman or Persian control and hegemony successfully. Only in the early 18th century did Russia start to make serious military inroads south of the Caucasus. In 1722, Peter the Great exploited the chaos and turmoil in the Safavid Persian Empire to lead an expedition against it, while he struck an alliance with Vakhtang VI, the Georgian ruler of Kartli and the Safavid-appointed governor of the region. However, the two armies failed to link up and the Russians retreated northward again, leaving the Georgians to the mercy of the Persians. Vakhtang ended his days in exile in Russia.

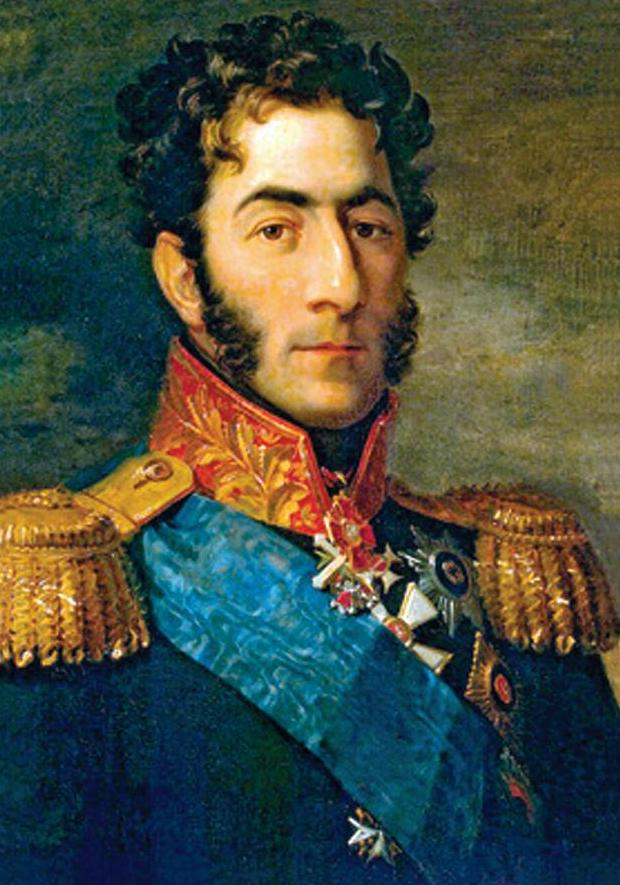
Pyotr Bagration, Russian general of Georgian origin

Vakhtang's successor, Heraclius II, king of Kartli-Kakheti from 1762 to 1798, turned towards Russia for protection against Ottoman and Persian attacks. The kings of the other major Georgian state, Imereti (in Western Georgia), also contacted Russia, seeking protection against the Ottomans. Russian empress Catherine the Great undertook a series of initiatives to enhance Russian influence in the Caucasus and strengthen the Russian presence on the ground. These involved reinforcing the defensive lines that had been established earlier in the century by Peter the Great, moving more Cossacks into the region to serve as border guards, and building new forts.

War broke out between the Russians and Ottomans in 1768, as both empires sought to secure their power in the Caucasus. In 1769–1772, a handful of Russian troops under General Tottleben battled against Turkish invaders in Imereti and Kartli-Kakheti. The course cut by Tottleben and his troops as they moved from north to south over the centre of the Caucasian Mountains laid the groundwork for what would come to be formalised through Russian investment over the next century as the Georgian Military Highway, the major overland route through the mountains. The war between the Russians and Ottomans was concluded in 1774 with the Treaty of Küçük Kaynarca.

In 1783, Heraclius II signed the Treaty of Georgievsk with Catherine, according to which Kartli-Kakheti agreed to forswear allegiance to any state except Russia, in return for Russian protection. But when another Russo-Turkish War broke out in 1787, the Russians withdrew their troops from the region for use elsewhere, leaving Heraclius's kingdom unprotected. In 1795, the new Persian shah, Agha Mohammed Khan issued an ultimatum to Heraclius, ordering him to break off relations with Russia or face invasion. Heraclius ignored it, counting on Russian help, which did not arrive. Agha Mohammad Khan carried out his threat and captured and burned the capital, Tbilisi, to the ground, as he sought to re-establish Persia's traditional suzerainty over the region.

== The Russian annexations ==
=== Eastern Georgia ===
In spite of Russia's failure to honour the terms of the Treaty of Georgievsk, Georgian rulers felt they had nowhere else to turn. The Persians had sacked and burned Tbilisi, leaving 20,000 dead. Agha Mohammad Khan, however, was assassinated in 1797 in Shusha, after which the Iranian grip over Georgia softened. Heraclius died the following year, leaving the throne to his sickly and ineffectual son Giorgi XII.

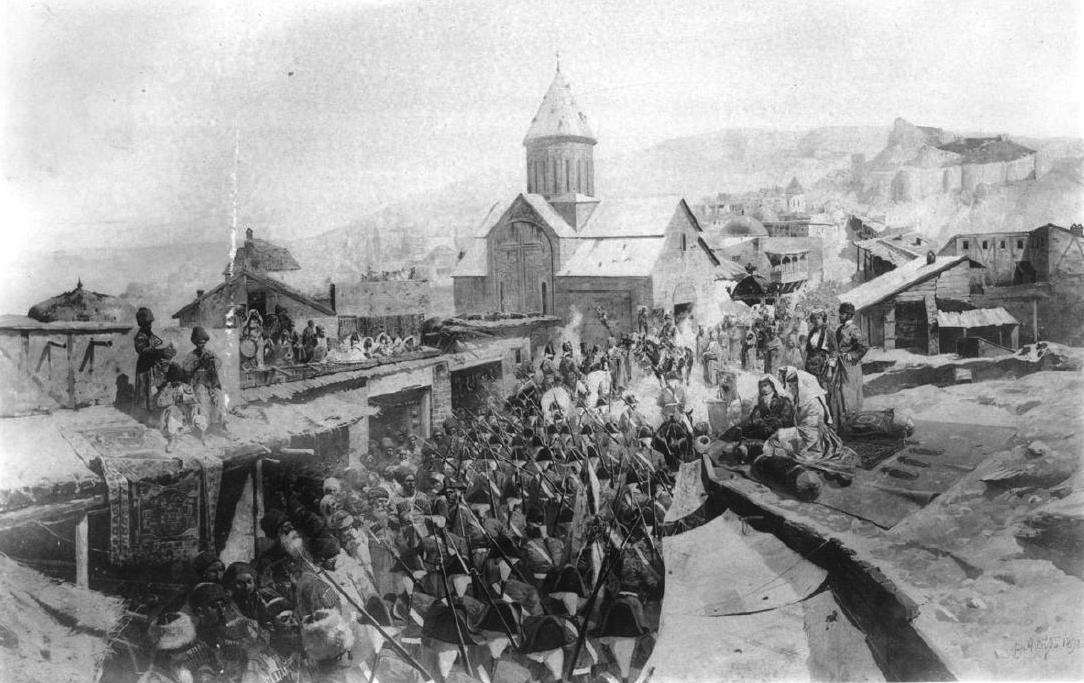
Entrance of the Russian troops in Tiflis, 26 November 1799, by Franz Roubaud, 1886

After Giorgi's death on 28 December 1800, the kingdom was torn between the claims of two rival heirs, Davit and Iulon. However, Tsar Paul I of Russia had already decided neither candidate would be crowned king. Instead, the monarchy would be abolished and the country administered by Russia. He signed a decree on the incorporation of Kartli-Kakheti into the Russian Empire which was confirmed by Tsar Alexander I on 12 September 1801. The Georgian envoy in Saint Petersburg, Garsevan Chavchavadze, reacted with a note of protest that was presented to the Russian vice-chancellor Alexander Kurakin. In May 1801, Russian General Carl Heinrich von Knorring removed the Georgian heir to the throne, David Batonishvili, from power and deployed a provisional government headed by General Ivan Petrovich Lazarev. Knorring had secret orders to remove all the male and some female members of the royal family to Russia. Some of the Georgian nobility did not accept the decree until April 1802, when General Knorring held the nobility in Tbilisi's Sioni Cathedral and forced them to take an oath on the imperial crown of Russia. Those who disagreed were arrested.

Now that Russia was able to use Georgia as a bridgehead for further expansion south of the Caucasus, Persia and the Ottoman Empire felt threatened. In 1804, Pavel Tsitsianov, the commander of Russian forces in the Caucasus, attacked Ganja, provoking the Russo-Persian War of 1804–1813. This was followed by the Russo-Turkish War of 1806–12 with the Ottomans, who were unhappy with Russian expansion in Western Georgia. Georgian attitudes were mixed: some fought as volunteers helping the Russian army, others rebelled against Russian rule (there was a major uprising in the highlands of Kartli-Kakheti in 1804). Both wars ended in Russian victory, with the Ottomans and Persians recognising the tsar's claims over Georgia (by the Treaty of Bucharest with Turkey and the Treaty of Gulistan with Persia).

=== Western Georgia ===
Solomon II of Imereti was angry at the Russian annexation of Kartli-Kakheti. He offered a compromise: he would make Imereti a Russian protectorate if the monarchy and autonomy of his neighbour was restored. Russia made no reply. In 1803, the ruler of Mingrelia, a region belonging to Imereti, rebelled against Solomon and acknowledged Russia as his protector instead. When Solomon refused to make Imereti a Russian protectorate too, the Russian general Tsitsianov invaded and on 25 April 1804, Solomon signed a treaty making him a Russian vassal.

However, Solomon was far from submissive. When war broke out between the Ottomans and Russia, Solomon started secret negotiations with the former. In February 1810, a Russian decree proclaimed that Solomon was dethroned and ordered Imeretians to pledge allegiance to the tsar. A large Russian army invaded the country, but many Imeretians fled to the forests to start a resistance movement. Solomon hoped that Russia, distracted by its wars with the Ottomans and Persia, would allow Imereti to become autonomous. The Russians eventually crushed the guerrilla uprising but they could not catch Solomon. However, Russia's peace treaties with Ottoman Turkey (1812) and Persia (1813) put an end to the king's hopes of foreign support (he had also tried to interest Napoleon). Solomon died in exile in Trabzon in 1815.

In 1828–29, another Russo-Turkish War ended with Russia adding the major port of Poti and the fortress towns of Akhaltsikhe and Akhalkalaki to its possessions in Georgia. From 1803 to 1878, as a result of numerous Russian wars now against Ottoman Turkey, several of Georgia's previously lost territories – such as Adjara – were also incorporated into the empire. The Principality of Guria was abolished and incorporated into the Empire in 1829, while Svaneti was gradually annexed in 1858. Mingrelia, although a Russian protectorate since 1803, was not absorbed until 1867.

== Early years of Russian rule ==
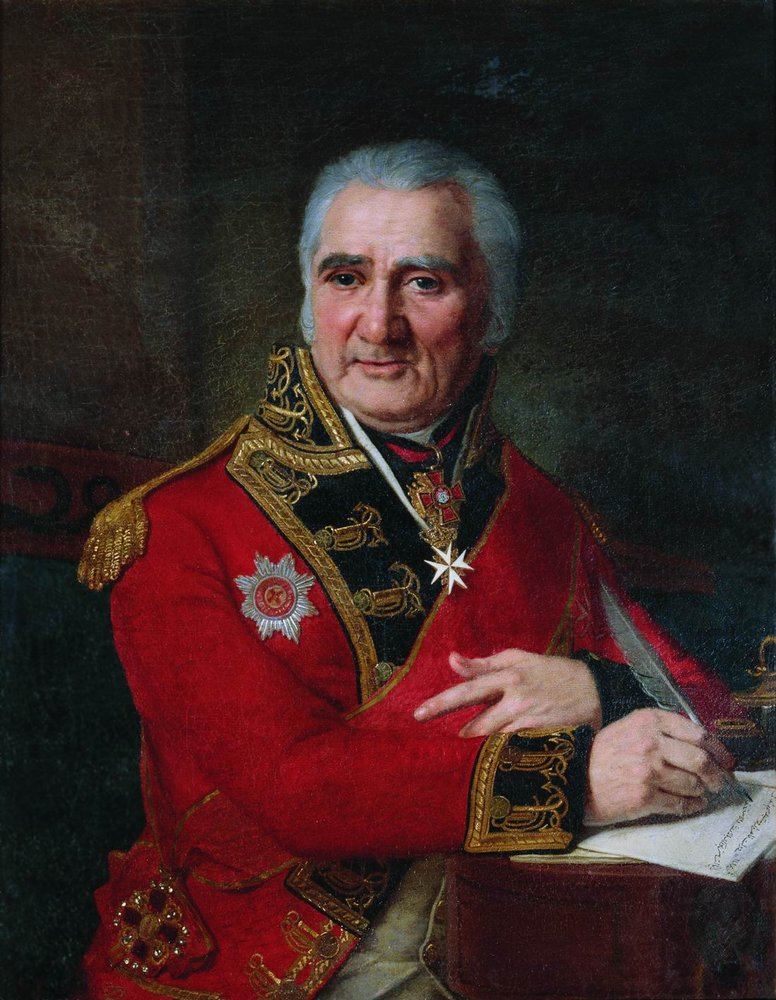
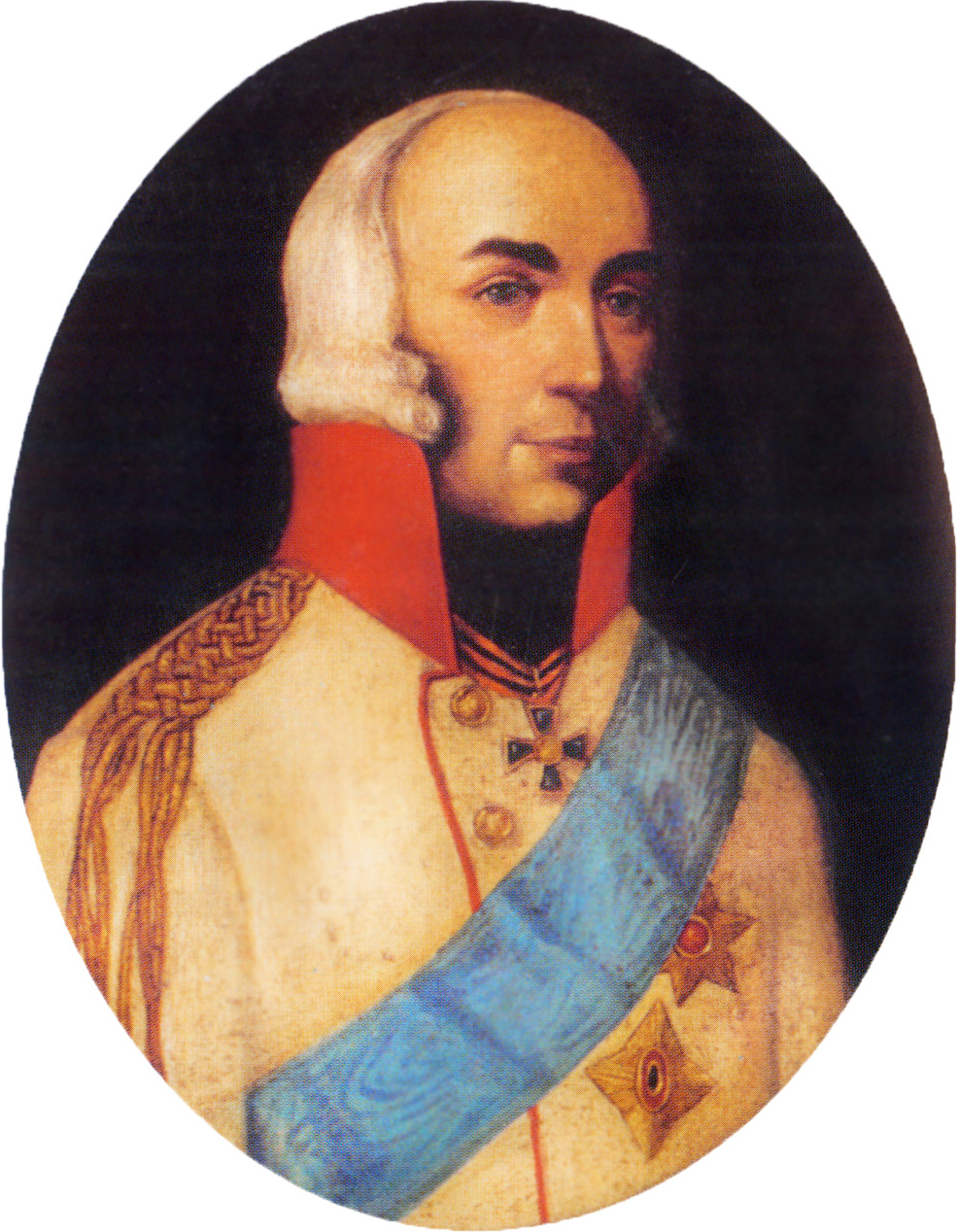
Ethnic Georgians in the Russian Imperial service, such as Sergey Lashkarev and Pavel Tsitsianov, were actively involved in the diplomatic and military aspects of bringing Georgia under Russian rule

=== Integration into the empire ===
During the first decades of Russian rule, Georgia was placed under military governorship. The land was at the frontline of Russia's war against Turkey and Persia and the commander-in-chief of the Russian army of the region was also the governor. Russia gradually expanded its territory in Transcaucasia at the expense of its rivals, taking large areas of land in the rest of the region, comprising all of modern-day Armenia and Azerbaijan from Qajar Persia through the Russo-Persian War (1826-1828) and the resulting Treaty of Turkmenchay. At the same time the Russian authorities aimed to integrate Georgia into the rest of their empire. Russian and Georgian societies had much in common: the main religion was Orthodox Christianity and in both countries a land-owning aristocracy ruled over a population of serfs. Initially, Russian rule proved high-handed, arbitrary and insensitive to local law and customs. In 1811, the autocephaly (i.e. independent status) of the Georgian Orthodox Church was abolished, the Catholicos Anton II was deported to Russia and Georgia became an exarchate of the Russian Church.

The Russian government also managed to alienate many Georgian nobles, prompting a group of young aristocrats to plot to overthrow Russian rule. They were inspired by events elsewhere in the Russian Empire: the Decembrist revolt in St. Petersburg in 1825 and the Polish uprising against the Russians in 1830. The Georgian nobles' plan was simple: they would invite all the Russian officials in the region to a ball then murder them. However, the conspiracy was discovered by the authorities on 10 December 1832 and its members were arrested and internally exiled elsewhere in the Russian Empire. There was a revolt by peasants and nobles in Guria in 1841. Things changed with the appointment of Mikhail Semyonovich Vorontsov as Viceroy of the Caucasus in 1845. Count Vorontsov's new policies won over the Georgian nobility, who increasingly adopted Western European customs and attire, as the Russian nobility had done in the previous century.

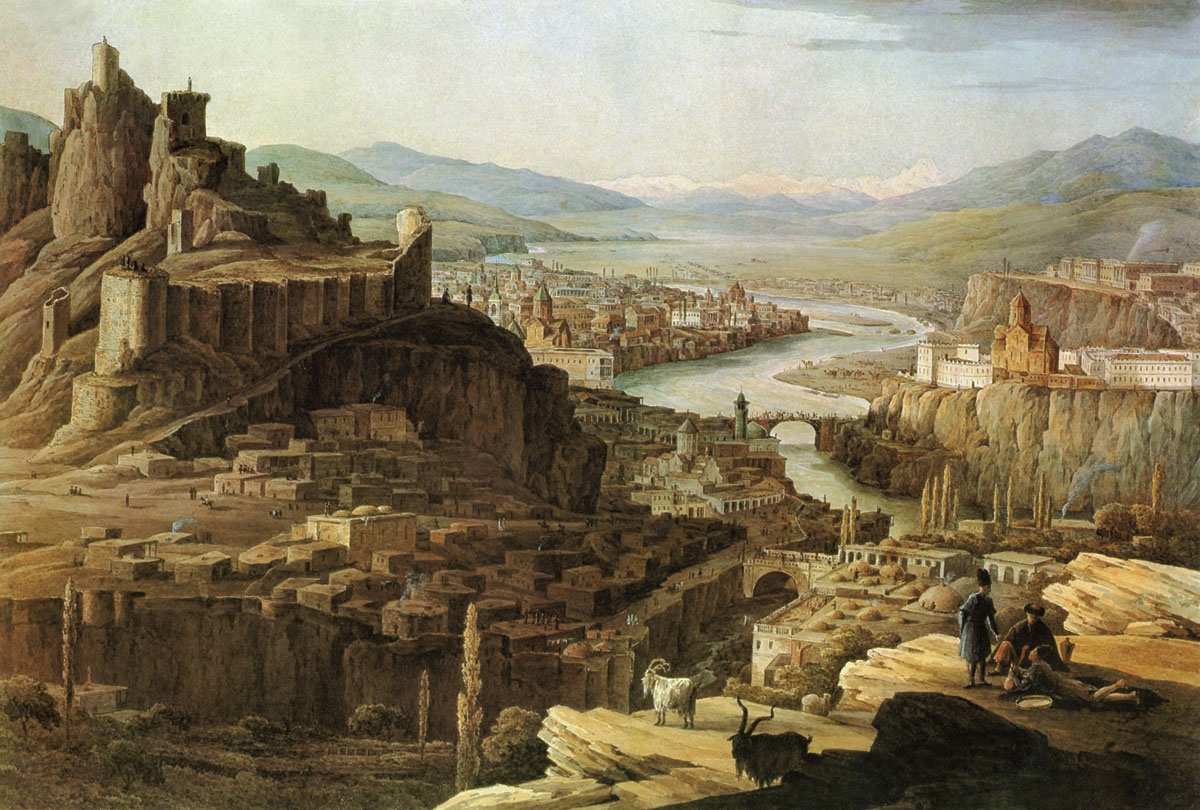
A painting of Tbilisi by Nikanor Chernetsov, 1832

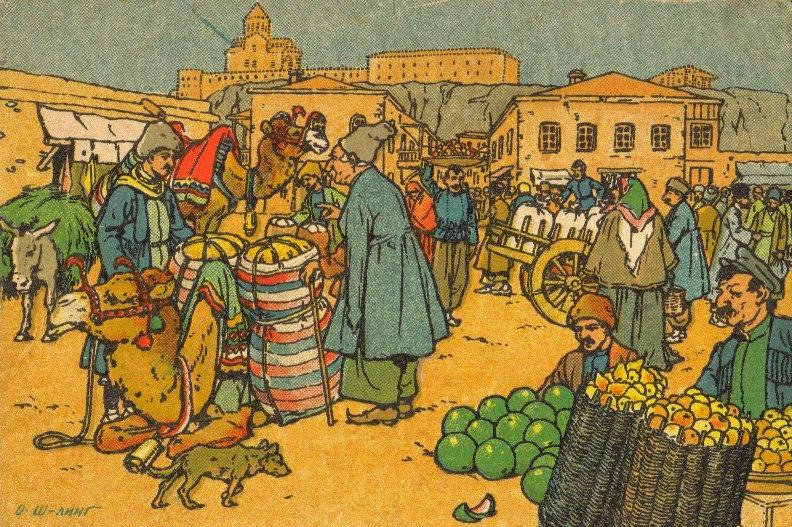
Old Tbilisi by Oskar Shmerling, 1900

=== Georgian society ===
When Russian rule began in the early 19th century Georgia was still ruled by royal families of the various Georgian states, but these were then deposed by the Russians and sent into internal exile elsewhere in the empire. Beneath them were the nobles, who constituted about 5 per cent of the population and protected their power and privileges. They owned most of the land, which was worked by their serfs. Peasants made up the bulk of Georgian society. The rural economy had become seriously depressed during the period of Ottoman and Persian domination and most Georgian serfs lived in dire poverty, subject to the frequent threat of starvation. Famine would often prompt them to rebellion, such as the major revolt in Kakheti in 1812.

=== Emancipation of the serfs ===
Serfdom was a problem not just in Georgia but throughout most of the Russian Empire. By the mid-19th century the issue of freeing the serfs had become impossible to ignore any longer if Russia was to be reformed and modernised. In 1861, Tsar Alexander II abolished serfdom in Russia proper. The tsar also wanted to emancipate the serfs of Georgia, but without losing the recently earned loyalty of the nobility whose power and income depended on serf labour. This called for delicate negotiations and the task of finding a solution that would be acceptable to the land-owners was entrusted to the liberal noble Dimitri Kipiani. On 13 October 1865, the tsar decreed the emancipation of the first serfs in Georgia. The process of abolition throughout all the traditional Georgian lands would last into the 1870s. The serfs became free peasants who could move where they liked, marry whom they chose and take part in political activity without asking their lords' permission. The nobles retained the title to all their land but it was to be divided into two parts. The nobles owned one of these parts (at least half of the land) outright, but the other was to be rented by the peasants who had lived and worked on it for centuries.

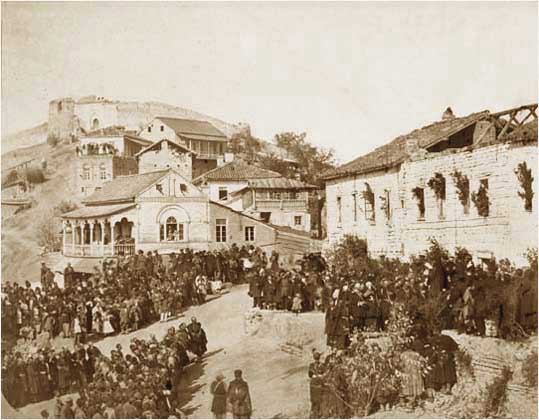
The emancipation manifesto promulgated in Sighnaghi, 1864

Over the years, after they had made sufficient payments to compensate the landlords, this land would become their own private property. In the event, the reforms pleased neither nobles nor the ex-serfs. Though they were now free peasants, the ex-serfs were still subject to the heavy financial burden of paying rent and it usually took decades before they were able to buy the land for themselves. In other words, they were still dependent on the nobles, not legally, but economically. The nobles had accepted the emancipation only with extreme reluctance and, though they had been more favourably treated than landowners in much of the rest of the empire, they had still lost some of their power and income. In the following years, both peasant and noble discontent would come to be expressed in new political movements in Georgia.

=== Immigration ===
During the reign of Nicholas II, Russian authorities encouraged the migration of various religious minorities, such as Molokans and Doukhobors, from Russia's heartland provinces into Transcaucasia, including Georgia. The intent was both to isolate the troublesome dissenters away from the Orthodox Russians (who could be "corrupted" by their ideas), and to strengthen Russian presence in the region. Because Georgia served as more-or-less a Russian march principality as a base for further expansion against the Ottoman Empire, other Christian communities from the Transcaucasus region were settled there in the 19th century, particularly Armenians and Caucasus Greeks. These subsequently often fought alongside Russians and Georgians in the Russian Caucasus Army in its wars against the Ottomans, helping capture territories in the South Caucasus bordering Georgia that became the Russian militarily administered provinces of Batumi Oblast and Kars Oblast, where tens of thousands of Armenians, Caucasus Greeks, Russians, and other ethnic minority communities living in Georgia were re-settled.

== Cultural and political movements ==
Incorporation into the Russian Empire changed Georgia's orientation away from the Middle East and towards Europe as members of the intelligentsia began to read about new ideas from the West. At the same time, Georgia shared many social problems with the rest of Russia, and the Russian political movements that emerged in the 19th century looked to also extend their following in Georgia.

=== Romanticism ===
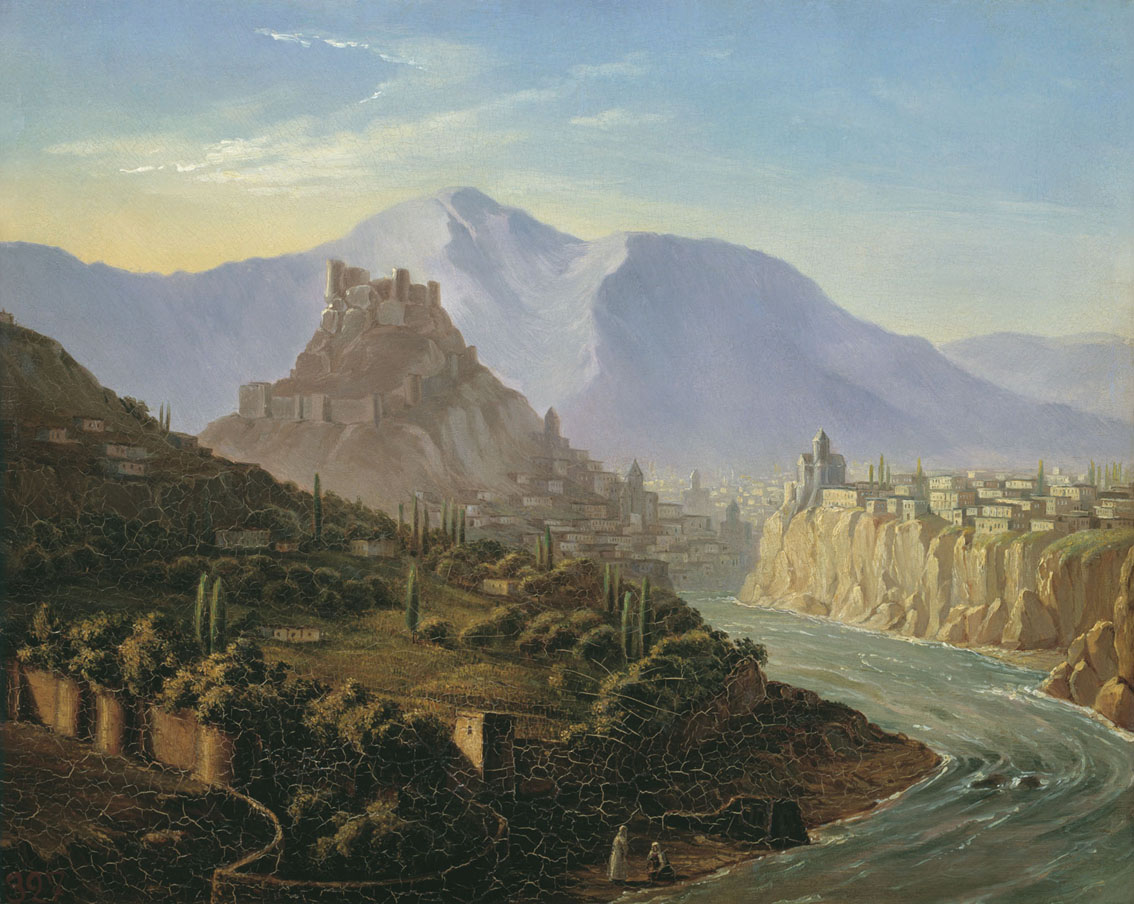
A painting of Tbilisi by Mikhail Lermontov

In the 1830s, Romanticism began to influence Georgian literature, which enjoyed a revival thanks to famous poets such as Alexander Chavchavadze, Grigol Orbeliani and, above all, Nikoloz Baratashvili. They began to explore Georgia's past, seeking a lost golden age which they used as an inspiration for their works. One of Baratashvili's best-known poems, Bedi Kartlisa ("Georgia's Fate"), expresses his deep ambivalence about the union with Russia in the phrase "what pleasure does the nightingale receive from honour if it is in a cage?"

Georgia became a theme in Russian literature as well. In 1829, Russia's greatest poet Alexander Pushkin visited the country and his experience is reflected in several of his lyrics. His younger contemporary, Mikhail Lermontov, was exiled to the Caucasus in 1840. The region appears as a land of exotic adventure in Lermontov's famous novel A Hero of Our Time and he also celebrated Georgia's wild, mountainous landscape in the long poem Mtsyri, about a novice monk who escapes from the strictness of religious discipline to find freedom in nature.

=== Nationalism ===
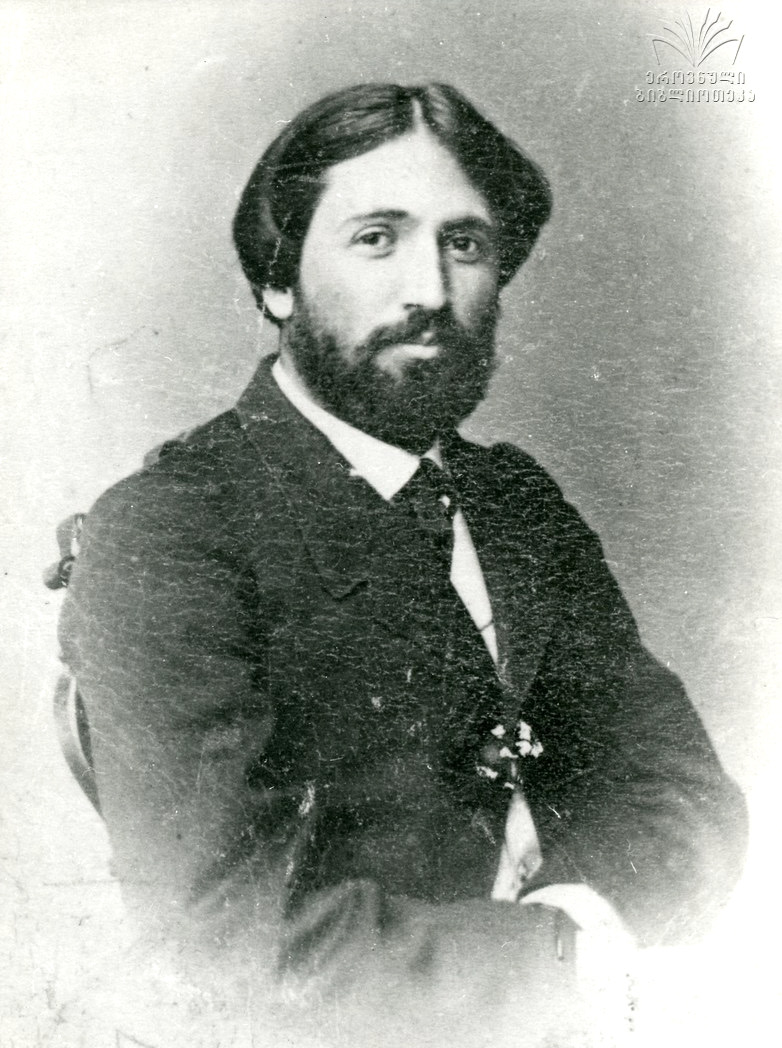
Ilia Chavchavadze, c.1860s

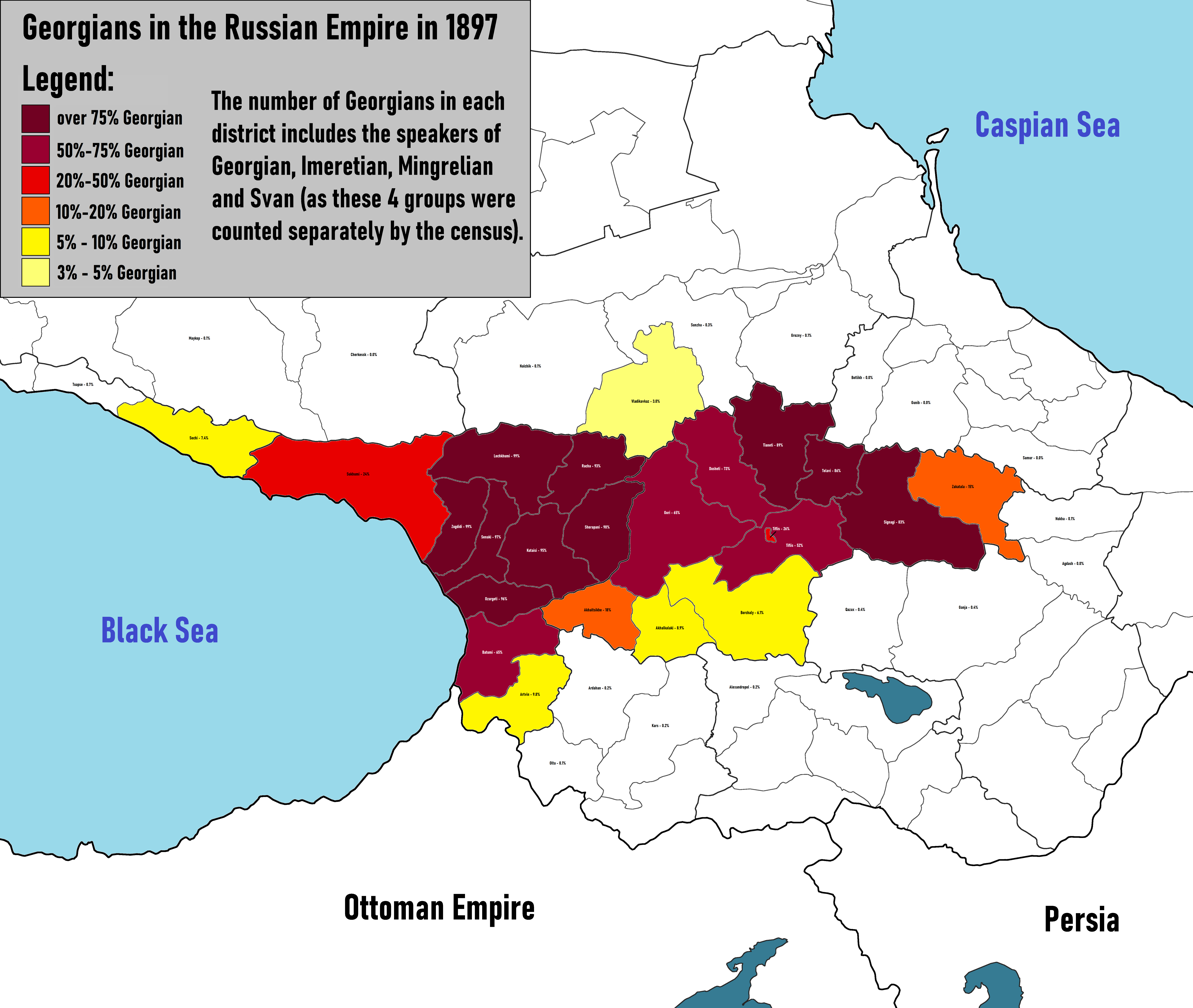
Georgians in the Russian Empire according to the 1897 census over 75% Georgian 50% – 75% Georgian 20% – 50% Georgian 10% – 20% Georgian 5% – 10% Georgian 3% – 5% Georgian

In the mid-19th century, Romantic patriotism gave way to a more overtly political national movement in Georgia. This began with a young generation of Georgian students educated at Saint Petersburg University, who were nicknamed the tergdaleulnis (after the Terek River which flows through Georgia and Russia). The most outstanding figure by far was the writer Ilia Chavchavadze, who was the most influential Georgian nationalist before 1905. He sought to improve the position of Georgians within a system that favoured Russian-speakers and turned his attention to cultural matters, especially linguistic reform and the study of folklore. Chavchavadze became more and more conservative, seeing it as his task to preserve Georgian traditions and ensure Georgia remained a rural society. The so-called second generation (meore dasi) of Georgian nationalists was less conservative than Chavchavadze. They focused more on the growing cities in Georgia, trying to ensure that urban Georgians could compete with the economically dominant Armenians and Russians. The leading figure in this movement was Niko Nikoladze, who was attracted to Western liberal ideas. Nikoladze believed that a Caucasus-wide federation of nations was the best format for resisting tsarist autocracy, a notion not accepted by many of his contemporaries.

=== Socialism ===
By the 1870s, alongside these conservative and liberal nationalist trends, a third, more radical political force had emerged in Georgia. Its members focused on social problems and tended to ally themselves with movements in the rest of Russia. The first stirrings were seen in the attempt to spread Russian populism to the region, though the populists had little practical effect. Socialism, particularly Marxism, proved far more influential in the long run.

Industrialisation had come to Georgia in the late 19th century, particularly to the towns of Tbilisi, Batumi and Kutaisi. With it had come factories, railways and a new, urban working class. In the 1890s, they became the focus of a "third generation" (Mesame Dasi) of Georgian intellectuals who called themselves Social Democrats, and they included Noe Zhordania and Filipp Makharadze, who had learned about Marxism elsewhere in the Russian Empire. They would become the leading force in Georgian politics from 1905 onwards. They believed that the tsarist autocracy should be overthrown and replaced by democracy, which would eventually create a socialist society.

== Later Russian rule ==
=== Increasing tensions ===
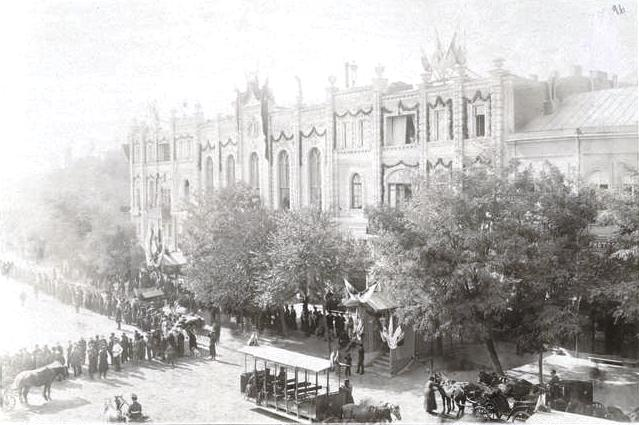
Tsar's entrance at the Assembly of Gentry in Tiflis (29 September 1888)

In 1881, the reforming Tsar Alexander II was assassinated by Russian populists in Saint Petersburg. His successor Alexander III was much more autocratic and frowned on any expression of national independence as a threat to his empire. In an effort to introduce more central control, he abolished the Caucasus Viceroyalty, reducing Georgia's status to that of any other Russian province. Study of the Georgian language was discouraged and the very name "Georgia" (Russian: Грузия, Georgian: საქართველო) was banned from newspapers. In 1886, a Georgian student killed the rector of the Tbilisi seminary in protest. When the ageing Dimitri Kipiani criticised the head of the Church in Georgia for attacking the seminary students, he was exiled to Stavropol, where he was mysteriously murdered. Many Georgians believed his death was the work of tsarist agents and mounted a huge anti-Russian demonstration at his funeral.

=== The revolution of 1905 ===
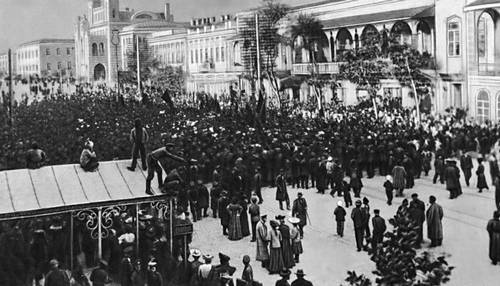
Street protests in Tiflis in 1905

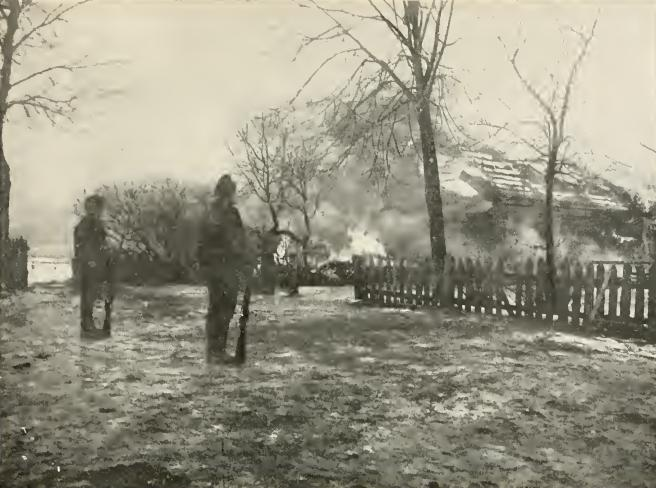
"Pacification" of western Georgia. Soldiers burning peasant houses.

The 1890s and early 1900s were marked by frequent strikes throughout Georgia. The peasants, too, were still discontented, and the Social Democrats won peasants and urban workers over to their cause. At this stage, the Georgian Social Democrats still saw themselves as part of an all-Russian political movement. However, at the Second Congress of the all-Russian Social Democratic Party held in Belgium in 1903, the party split into two irreconcilable groups: the Mensheviks and the Bolsheviks. By 1905, the Social Democratic movement in Georgia had overwhelmingly decided in favour of the Mensheviks and their leader Noe Zhordania. One of the few Georgians to opt for the Bolshevik faction was the young Ioseb Jughashvili, better known as Joseph Stalin.

In January 1905, the troubles within the Russian Empire came to a head when the army fired on a crowd of demonstrators in Saint Petersburg, killing at least 96 people. The news provoked a wave of protests and strikes throughout the country in what became known as the 1905 Revolution. The unrest quickly spread to Georgia, where the Mensheviks had recently co-ordinated a large peasant revolt in the Guria region. The Mensheviks were again at the forefront during a year which saw a series of uprisings and strikes, met by the tsarist authorities with a combination of violent repression (carried out by Cossacks) and concessions. In December, the Mensheviks ordered a general strike and encouraged their supporters to bomb the Cossacks, who responded with more bloodshed. The Mensheviks' resort to violence alienated many people, including their Armenian political allies, and the general strike collapsed. All resistance to the tsarist authorities was finally quelled by force in January 1906 with the arrival of an army led by General Maksud Alikhanov.

The years between 1906 and the outbreak of World War I were comparatively more peaceful in Georgia, which was now under the rule of a relatively liberal Governor of the Caucasus, Count Ilarion Vorontsov-Dashkov. However, some degree of instability and political resistance continued, with notable examples including the 1906 Dusheti treasury heist organized by Georgian nationalists.

The Mensheviks believed they had gone too far with the violence of late 1905. Unlike the Bolsheviks, they now rejected the idea of armed insurrection. In 1906, the first elections for a national parliament (the Duma) were held in the Russian Empire and the Mensheviks won the seats representing Georgia by a landslide. The Bolsheviks had little support except in the Manganese mine of Chiatura, though they gained publicity with an armed robbery to gain funds in Tbilisi in 1907. Most Georgians disapproved of violence orchestrated by the Bolsheviks. After this incident, Stalin and his colleagues moved to Baku, the only real Bolshevik stronghold in the South Caucasus.

=== World War I and independence ===
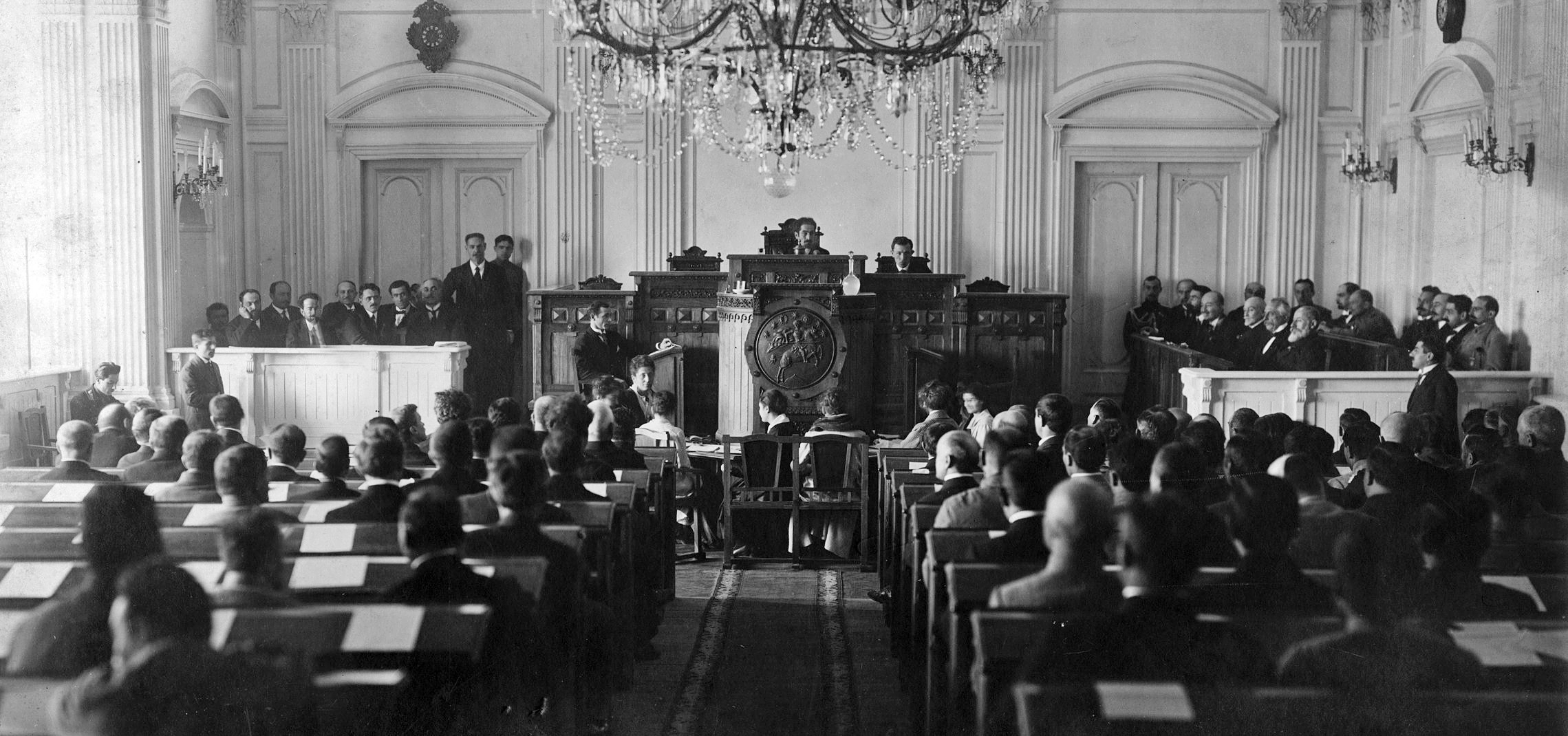
Declaration of independence by the Georgian parliament, 1918

Russia entered World War I against Germany in August 1914. The war aroused little enthusiasm from the people in Georgia, who did not see much to be gained from the conflict, although 200,000 Georgians were mobilised to fight in the army. When Turkey joined the war on Germany's side in November, Georgia found itself on the frontline. Most Georgian politicians remained neutral, though pro-German feeling and the sense that independence was within reach began to grow among the population.

In 1917, as the Russian war effort collapsed, the February Revolution broke out in Saint Petersburg. The new Provisional Government established a branch to rule Transcaucasia called Ozakom (Extraordinary Committee for Transcaucasia). There was tension in Tbilisi since the mainly Russian soldiers in the city favoured the Bolsheviks, but as 1917 went on, the soldiers began to desert and head northwards, leaving Georgia virtually free from the Russian army and in the hands of the Mensheviks, who rejected the October Revolution that brought the Bolsheviks to power in the Russian capital. Transcaucasia was left to fend for itself and, as the Turkish army began to encroach across the border in February 1918, the question of separation from Russia was brought to the fore.

On 22 April 1918, the parliament of Transcaucasia voted for independence, declaring itself to be the Transcaucasian Democratic Federative Republic. It was to last for only a month. The new republic was made up of Georgia, Armenia and Azerbaijan, each with their different histories, cultures and aspirations. The Armenians were well aware of the Armenian genocide in Turkey, so for them defence against the invading army was paramount, while the Muslim Azeris were sympathetic to the Turks. The Georgians felt that their interests could best be guaranteed by coming to a deal with the Germans rather than the Turks. On 26 May 1918, Georgia declared its independence and a new state was born, the Democratic Republic of Georgia, which would enjoy a brief period of freedom before the Bolsheviks invaded in 1921.

== See also ==
- History of Georgia (country)

== Sources ==
- Anchabadze, George (2005). History of Georgia: A Short Sketch. Caucasian House. ISBN 9992871598.
- Avalov, Zurab (1906). Prisoedinenie Gruzii k Rossii. St. Petersburg: Montvid.
- Bolashvili, Nana; Dittmann, Andreas; King, Lorenz; Neidze, Vazha, eds. (2018). National Atlas of Georgia. Steiner Verlag. ISBN 9783515120579.
- Fisher, William Bayne; Avery, P.; Hambly, G.R.G; Melville, C. (1991). The Cambridge History of Iran. Vol. 7. Cambridge University Press. ISBN 0521200954.
- Gvosdev, Nikolas K. (2000). Imperial policies and perspectives towards Georgia: 1760–1819. St. Martin's Press / St Antony's College, Oxford. ISBN 0-312-22990-9.
- Kazemzadeh, Firuz (1991). "Iranian relations with Russia and the Soviet Union, to 1921". In Avery, Peter; Hambly, Gavin; Melville, Charles (eds.). The Cambridge History of Iran. Vol. 7. Cambridge University Press. ISBN 9780521200950.
- King, Charles (2008). The Ghost of Freedom: A History of the Caucasus. New York City: Oxford University Press. ISBN 9780195177756.
- Lang, David M. (1957). The last years of the Georgian Monarchy: 1658–1832. New York City: Columbia University Press.
- Lang, David M. (1962). A Modern History of Soviet Georgia. Grove Press.
- Rayfield, Donald (2012). Edge of Empires: A History of Georgia. Reaktion Books. ISBN 9781780230306.
- Assatiani, Nodar; Bendianachvili, Alexandre (1997). Histoire de la Géorgie (in French). L'Harmattan. ISBN 9782738461865.
- Suny, Ronald Grigor (1994). The Making of the Georgian Nation (2nd ed.). Indiana University Press. ISBN 0-253-20915-3.
