= Princess Tamar of Georgia (1791–1857) =

Tamar (Georgian: თამარ ბატონიშვილი, romanized: tamar bat'onishvili; 1791–1857) was a Georgian royal princess (batonishvili) of the Bagrationi dynasty.

== Biography ==
Tamar was born in 1791 and was the daughter of Prince Iulon of Georgia and his wife, Princess Salome Amilakhvari. She was a granddaughter of King Heraclius II of Georgia and was educated at the royal court and in the family.

In 1811, at the age of 20, Tamar was appointed a lady-in-waiting to the Russian Empress, Elizabeth Alexeievna. She often visited Saint Petersburg and participated in palace ceremonies. Tamar became an active member of the 1832 Georgian plot and involved several influential women in the affair. She also participated in drawing up a plan for the uprising. After the plot collapsed, Tamar was deprived of her title of Tsarevna ("princess"). She died in 1857 and was buried in Mtskheta.
