= Prince Levan of Georgia (1786–1812) =

Levan (Georgian: ლევანი, ლეონი; 1786–1812) was a grandson of King Heraclius II of Georgia, who led a Georgian-Ossetian rebellion against the Russian rule in 1810. He was killed by the Lezgins brigands in October 1812.

== Early life ==
Levan was born into the family of Prince Iulon of Georgia and his wife Princess Salome, daughter of Revaz Amilakhvari, in 1786. The family lived in Tbilisi, the capital of Heraclius II, until its sack by the Persians in 1795. After that, Iulon moved his household to his princely domain in the Ksani valley, where the young Levan was educated privately by the respected dean Ioane Kartvelishvili.

After the death of his half-brother George XII in December 1800, Iulon claimed the rights to the throne of the Kingdom of Kartli-Kakheti, but the royal succession was disrupted by the Russian government, which went ahead with the plan of outright annexation of Georgia. In April 1801, in defiance of the Russian regime, Iulon retired to western Georgia, to his sisterly nephew, King Solomon II of Imereti. In June 1804, 18-year-old Levan accompanied his father, Iulon, and uncle, Parnaoz, in a futile attempt to join the rebellion by the Georgian highlanders against the Russians. On their retreat to Imereti, the Russian troops surprised the fugitive princes and captured Iulon. Levan and Parnaoz managed to escape to Iran, which was then at war with Russia. Parnaoz was captured by the Russians later that year in the rebellious Georgian province of Mtiuleti, while Levan joined another of his uncles, Alexander, in his service in the Iranian military at Erivan.

== Ossetian rebellion ==
In July 1810, Levan, through Akhaltsikhe and Imereti, penetrated into the Liakhvi valley and on July 26 issued a proclamation from the village of Kekhvi, calling for the nobles of Kartli to join the rebellion against Russia. It was arranged that Levan's forces would then join the Imeretian rebels under his cousin, the deposed king Solomon II, and with the help of the Ottoman and Iranian armies dislodge the Russians from Georgia. Levan raised a force of some 2,000 Ossetian peasants and placed the town of Tskhinvali under siege, but failed to take it. The princes Machabeli, on whose lands many of the Ossetians lived, stood by Levan's side. The Russian commander in Georgia, Alexander Tormasov, also received intelligence that Levan was preparing to seize his uncle, the Catholicos-Patriarch of Georgia Anton II, who had been pressured by the Russians to leave for Russia. Anton was eventually escorted out of Tiflis on 3 November 1810 and on 11 July 1811 stripped of his office.

In September 1810, the Russian reinforcements under Colonel Stahl defeated major rebel contingents in the Liakhvi valley. The rebellious villages were burned down, the towers of Ossetian families were blown up, and the princes Machabeli were rounded up. Of Levan's noble allies, Durmishkhan Tusishvili was killed in fighting, Luarsab Machabeli was banished to Russia, and Baadur Bortishvili died in jail in Tiflis. The Ossetian peasant leaders, Tokh and Bibo Sanakoshvili, were hanged in Gori on 7 February 1811.

After his defeat, Levan found refuge among the Ossetians of the Nar gorge, north of the Greater Caucasus mountains. In vain Prince Iulon, now living in Russia, and General Tormasov tried to persuade Levan to surrender in exchange for the right to join his father in his safe exile. Prince Yeremey Bagration, a Russian army officer of Georgian origin, was sent to parley, but Levan had him tortured and sold to the Kabardians. A reward of 2,000 roubles and a pension was offered for Levan's capture. Levan, accompanied by only three Ossetians, decided to make his way to the Ottoman-controlled Akhaltsikhe, but was stabbed to death by the Lezgins encountered in a cornfield at Gogias-Tsikhe in the Borjomi gorge in October 1812. So that only Levan's severed head and blood-stained garments reached the pasha of Akhaltsikhe, who had the Lezgin murderers arrested and executed. Levan's remains were interred by the serfs of the princes Tsitsishvili at the then-defunct monastery of St. Nicholas at Kintsvisi.

== Ancestry ==
Ancestors of Prince Levan of Georgia (1786–1812)

16. Heraclius I of Kakheti
8. Teimuraz II
17. Ana Cholokashvili
4. Heraclius II of Georgia
18. Vakhtang VI
9. Tamar of Kartli
19. Rusudan of Circassia
2. Prince Iulon
20. Bezhan Dadiani
10. Katsia-Giorgi Dadiani
21. Tamar Gelovani
5. Darejan Dadiani
1. Leon
24. Andukapar Amilakhvari
12. Otar Amilakhvari
6. Revaz Amilakhvari
26. Zurab, Duke of Aragvi
13. Mariam of Aragvi
3. Salome Amilakhvari
28. Revaz, Duke of Aragvi
14. Bezhan, Duke of Aragvi
29. Tamar N.
7. N. of Aragvi
