= Solomon Dodashvili =

Georgian philosopher (1805–1836)

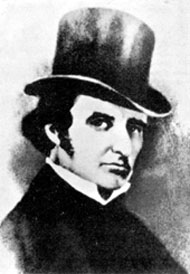
Solomon Dodashvili

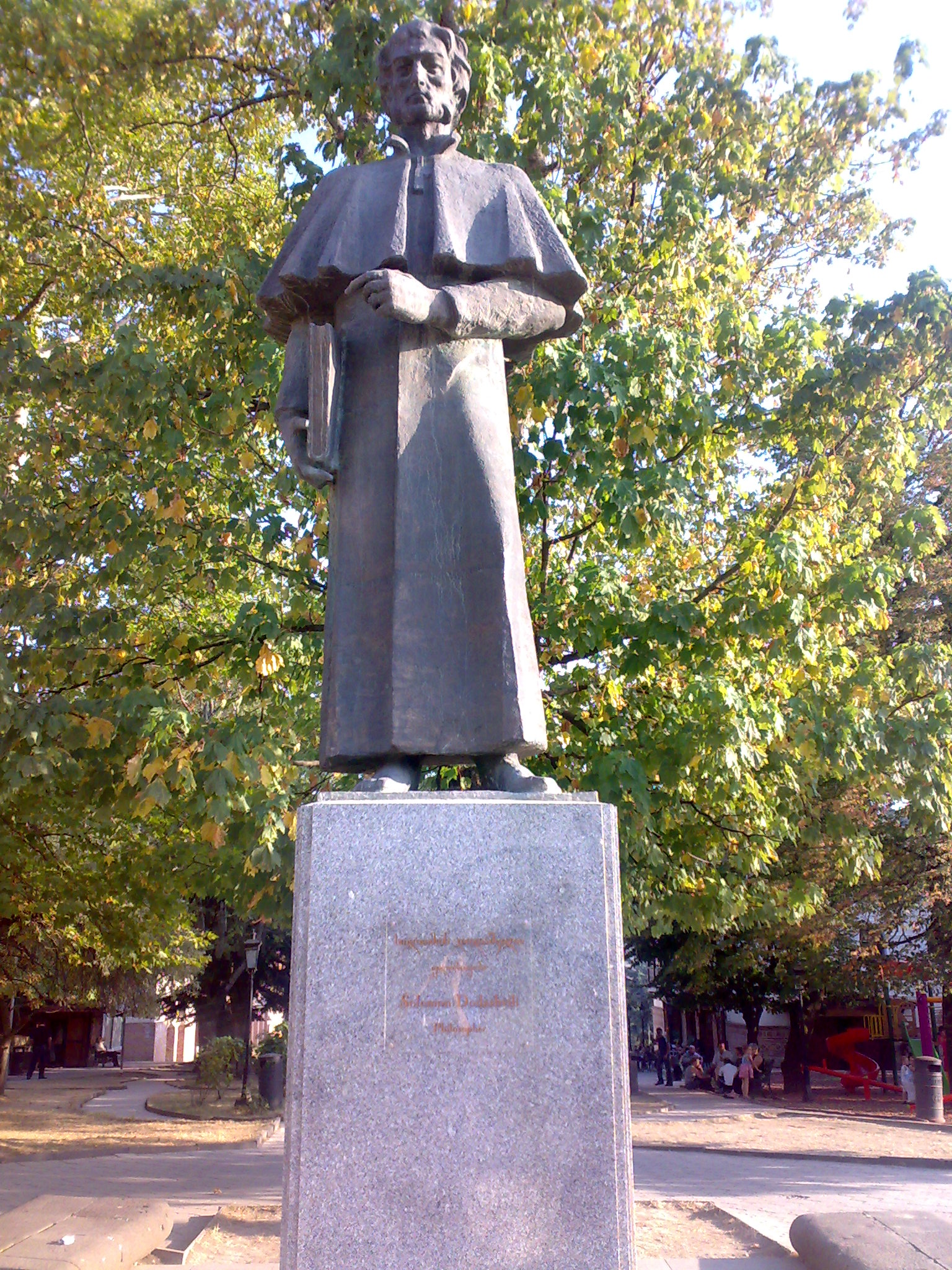
Monument to Solomon Dodashvili in Sighnaghi

Solomon Dodashvili (Georgian: სოლომონ დოდაშვილი), also known as Solomon Ivanovich Dodaev-Mogarsky (Russian: Соломон Иванович Додаев-Могарский) (May 17, 1805 – August 20, 1836), was a Georgian philosopher, journalist, historian, grammarian, belletrist and enlightener.

Dodashvili was born in Magharo, Kakheti, Georgia, then part of Imperial Russia. Having graduated from St Petersburg University in 1827, he obtained a Magister degree in philosophy there in 1828. During his stay in the Russian capital, he was close to Decembrist ideas and witnessed their 1825 mutiny. In 1828, Dodashvili returned to Tiflis, where he worked as an educator. He composed histories, grammars, and summaries of philosophy for his young pupils and led them into political opposition to the Russian rule. His idealistic pedagogues influenced many Georgian intellectuals and poets, including Nikoloz Baratashvili, who combined modern nationalism with European Romanticism. At the same time, from 1828 to 1832, he edited the first Georgian-language literary magazine "Tp’ilisis utsk’ebani", a weekly addition to the Russian "Tiflisskie Vedomosti".

His career was terminated by the failure of the 1832 conspiracy against the Russian hegemony, in which he was a participant. Unlike most of his coconspirators, who seconded the restoration of Georgian monarchy, he proposed a republic as a form of government. Arrested by police, he was deported to Russia proper. He was kept in captivity in Vyatka and died there of tuberculosis. He was reburied to Mtatsminda Pantheon, Tbilisi, in 1994.

Main works

- S. Dodashvili. "Logic" (a monograph), St. Petersburg, 1828 (in Russian); Tbilisi, 1949 (in Georgian)
- S. Dodashvili. "Short look at the Georgian literature".- "Moskovskie Vedomosti", No 10, Moscow, 1832 (in Russian)
- S. Dodashvili. "Methodology of Logic" (a monograph), Tbilisi, 1829 (in Russian)
- S. Dodashvili. "Brief Grammar of Georgian language", Tbilisi, 1830 (in Georgian)
