= Dimitri Kipiani =

Marshal of Nobility of Tiflis
- In office 1875–1878

Personal details
- Born: April 14, 1814 Mereti, Governorate of Tbilisi, Georgia, Russian Empire.
- Died: October 24, 1887 (aged 73) Stavropol, Russian Empire
- Resting place: Pantheon of the Holy Mountain, Tbilisi, Georgia
- Education: Tiflis School of Nobility (Presently, the First Classical Gymnasium)
- Profession: Statesman, publicist, writer, translator

Prince Dimitri Ivanes dze Kipiani (Georgian: დიმიტრი ყიფიანი alternatively spelled as Qipiani) (April 14, 1814 – October 24, 1887) was a Georgian statesman, publicist, writer and translator. A leader of Georgia's liberal nobility, he was known for his work in support of the Georgian culture and society, a cause that led to his 1886 exile and murder at the hands of Russian Imperial authorities. In 2007 he was canonized by the Georgian Orthodox Church as a saint.

== Early life and liberal activities ==
He was born to a noble family in the village of Mereti near Gori, Georgia, then part of Imperial Russia. Having graduated from the Tiflis School of Nobility in 1830, he then worked there as a teacher. Following the collapse of the 1832 Georgian plot against the Russian rule, to which Kipiani was a participant, he was deported to Vologda, where he briefly worked for the local governor's chancellery. Allowed to return to Georgia in 1837, he entered the civil service and held, until 1864, various positions at the viceregal office. During his tenure, he became a prominent spokesman for liberal nobility. During the emancipation reform, he was entrusted with the task of formulating the noble position and charged, in 1862, with devising a way to free the Georgian serfs. His plan did not well compensate the serfs; they would not be given any land, but rather would continue to farm their landlord's plots and pay for the use of it. Subsequently, he was actively involved in the emancipation program, articulating the interests of the small and middle nobility. He was elected as a Marshal of the Nobility of the Tiflis and Kutaisi guberniyas from 1864 to 1870 and from 1879 to 1886, respectively. In the period of 1876-1879, he served as a mayor of Tiflis.

== Georgian national identity and conflict with the Imperial authorities ==
Kipiani was energetically involved in Georgia’s social and cultural life. He was a Vice-President of the Caucasian Agrarian Society and a co-founder of the Tiflis Nobility Bank, Society for the Spreading of Literacy Among Georgians and "Georgian Dramatic Society". His essays and articles were systematically published in Georgian and Russian press. Kipiani was also one of the promoters of rediscovering, documentinga and promoting Georgian chant. He became the first Georgian translator of Shakespeare and authored a book, Modern Georgian Grammar. In addition to its strictly practical and educational value, the book was of considerable political significance, for the disagreement between Georgian intellectuals and Imperial authorities over the language issue was growing increasingly tense.

Despite Kipiani's professed loyalty, the Russian authorities were suspicious of him. Kipiani saw the 1783 Treaty of Georgievsk the only fair model for the Russian-Georgian relations and remained a stubborn defender of a native language and culture. Convinced that "real progress can only be achieved by a nation that thinks and speaks in its native language", he opposed a policy of limiting the status of Georgian language in state-sponsored schools in the 1870s.

In October 1885, Kipiani denounced the Russian viceroy of the Caucasus, Aleksandr Dondukov-Korsakov, to Grand Duke Michael Nicolaievich of Russia whom he met during Michael’s visit to Borjomi, and accused the viceroy of persecuting Georgian culture. He composed a special report to the viceroy and the Imperial administration, but was forced to moderate his activities under a strong pressure from St. Petersburg.

Nevertheless, Kipiani's final split with the Russian authorities followed shortly afterwards. It occurred in connection with the notorious incident in 1886, when a Georgian student Laghiashvili, expelled from the Tbilisi Theological Seminary for his nationalist sentiments, assassinated the rector, Chudetsky, who had banned Georgian as medium of instruction in the seminary and described it as "a language for dogs." When the Russian Exarch of Georgia, Pavel, anathematized the Georgian nation in response to the incident, Kipiani wrote to him on June 8, 1886: "Your Reverence, rumor has it that you have anathematized the country which you have been called on to guide spiritually and which looked to you only for love and grace. If all this is true, Your Reverence, the only way of rescuing the honor of your office is for the insulter to leave the insulted country forthwith." On August 6, on the order of tsar Alexander III of Russia, Kipiani was removed from his post and sent into exile to Stavropol where he was soon murdered in mysterious circumstances.

On October 26, 1887, he was reburied to Tiflis and interred at the Mtatsminda Pantheon. He is commemorated in the Dimitri Kipiani House Museum in Kvishkheti, in the Municipality of Khashuri, above the road to Borjomi. His legacy is described as part of some broader historical sweeps, and also in some standalone pieces that describe him as a pivotal and emblematic Georgian figure under Russian imperial rule.

== See also ==
- Ilia Chavchavadze

== Main works ==
- "Несколько мыслей о материалах для истории Грузии" ("Кавказ", 1854, № 30 - 33, 35 и 39).
- "Записки" ("Русская Старина", 1886, книги 3, 5, 7 - 9).
