= Tsarevich =

Title given to the sons of tsars (heirs apparent)

Tsarevich (Note: Also spelled Czarevich in English.) (Russian: царевич, IPA: [tsɐˈrʲevʲɪtɕ]) was a title given to the sons of tsars. The female equivalent was tsarevna.

Under the 1797 Pauline house laws, the title was discontinued and replaced with tsesarevich for the heir apparent alone. His younger brothers were given the title of veliky knyaz, translated as grand prince or, more commonly, as grand duke.

Historically, the term was also applied to descendants of the khans (tsars) of Kazan, Kasimov, and Siberia after these khanates had been conquered by Russia. The descendants of the deposed royal families of Georgia or the batonishvili were given the titles of tsarevich until 1833, when they were demoted to knyaz after a failed coup to restore the Georgian monarchy.
