= Prince Iulon of Georgia =

Georgian prince

Iulon
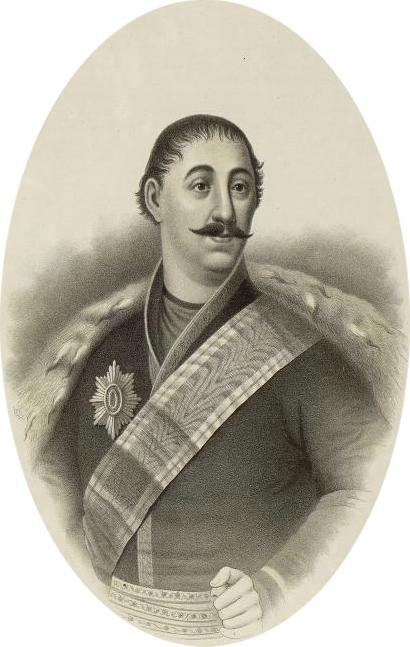

Duke of Ksani
- Reign: 1790–1801
- Predecessor: Prince George
- With: Prince Ioane (1790–1801); Prince Bagrat (1790–1801)
- Born: 4 June 1760; Telavi, Kingdom of Kakheti
- Died: 23 October 1816 (aged 56); Saint Petersburg, Russian Empire
- Spouse: Salome Amilakhvari (m. 1785)
- Issue Among others: Prince Levan; Princess Tamar; Prince Dimitri
- Dynasty: Bagrationi
- Father: Heraclius II of Georgia
- Mother: Darejan Dadiani
- Religion: Georgian Orthodox Church
- Khelrtva

Iulon (Georgian: იულონი, romanized: iuloni; 4 June 1760 – 23 October 1816) was a Georgian royal prince (batonishvili) of the Bagrationi dynasty, born into the family of King Heraclius II and Queen Darejan Dadiani. He advanced claim to the throne of Kartli-Kakheti after the death of his half-brother George XII in 1800 and opposed the Russian annexation of Georgia until being apprehended and deported in 1805 to Tula. He died in Saint Petersburg and was buried at the Alexander Nevsky Lavra.

== Early life ==
Iulon was a son of Heraclius II of his third marriage to Darejan Dadiani, born at the royal castle of Telavi in 1760. In September 1787, Iulon, together with Prince Orbeliani, commanded a 4,000-strong Georgian force sent by Heraclius against his former ally Ibrahim, khan of Karabakh. The Georgians were victorious, but the sudden withdrawal of an allied Russian army from the Caucasus rendered further operations abortive.

In 1790, Iulon received a princely domain in the Ksani valley after Heraclius II dispossessed the defiant Kvenipneveli dynasty of the duchy of Ksani, dividing it into three parts. Other parts of the duchy were granted to Iulon's half-nephews, Ioane and Bagrat, sons of Crown Prince George, the future King George XII. In addition, in 1794, Iulon was placed in charge of the province of Kartli. At the time of an invasion by the Iranian army of Agha Mohammad Khan Qajar in 1795, he was headquartered at Gori and did not take part in fighting which devastated Heraclius's capital, Tbilisi.

== Issue of succession ==
In 1791, at insistence of Queen Darejan, Heraclius II signed a testament, requiring the king's successor to pass the throne not to his offspring, but to his eldest brother, thereby making Iulon the second in the line of succession, behind his half-brother Crown Prince George. After Heraclius's death in 1798, the ailing king George XII abrogated this new law of succession and obtained from Tsar Paul I recognition of his son, David, as heir-apparent on 18 April 1799. These developments gave rise of implacable enmity between the king and his half-brothers. Iulon became a rallying point for the disaffected Georgian nobles.

By July 1800, the kingdom faced the prospect of imminent civil war as the rival factions mobilized their loyal forces. Iulon, Vakhtang, and Parnaoz blocked the roads to Tbilisi and attempted to rescue their mother, Queen Dowager Darejan, who had been forced by George XII into confinement at her own palace in Avlabari. The arrival of additional Russian troops under Major-General Vasily Gulyakov in September 1800 in Tbilisi made George XII's position relatively secure, but the unrest continued.

After George XII's death on 30 December 1800, Iulon stepped forward as a claimant to the Georgian throne, determined to take power in accordance with Heraclius's will, against George's son and heir Prince David. He had his loyalists began to occupy the key fortresses in the country and proclaimed himself as the rightful king.

== Rebellion, arrest, and exile ==
The Russian government eventually prevented both David and Iulon from acceding to the throne and decided the Georgian question in favor of outright annexation of the kingdom to the Russian Empire. The Russian commander in Georgia, General Ivan Lazarev, requested that all the members of the royal house should assemble and remain in Tbilisi. In April 1801, Iulon and his younger brother, Parnaoz, defied the order and retired to western Georgia, to the court of their sisterly nephew, King Solomon II of Imereti, who had upheld Iulon's claim to the throne of Kartli-Kakheti. Iulon was also in touch with his younger brother, Alexander, who had fled to Dagestan in defiance of the Russian regime. In June 1802, Fath-Ali Shah Qajar of Iran recognized Iulon on the Georgian throne in a decree sent to Solomon II. On 25 July 1802 the leading nobles of Kakheti issued a proclamation calling upon the people to recognize Iulon as king. The Russians responded to the discontent with a wave of arrests and deportations.

In May 1804, the Georgian and Ossetian highlanders rose in rebellion against the Russian rule. Iulon, his son Levan, and brother Parnaoz were invited to lead the movement, but the princes failed to make their way to the rebellious areas and fell back to Imereti. A Russian detachment, commanded by Captain Novitsky and guided by the Georgian prince Giorgi Amirejibi, hurried from Tskhinvali and surprised Iulon's sleeping men at the Imeretian border. In a brief skirmish on 24 June 1804, Iulon was captured, barely escaping death, and sent in custody to Tbilisi. Levan and Parnaoz fled to the Iranian-controlled territory. On 4 April 1805, Iulon and his family were escorted to their exile to Tula. The governor of Tula, Ivanov, was instructed in a secret letter by the tsar Alexander I to keep him informed about Iulon's life on a weekly basis. Later, Iulon was allowed to settle in Saint Petersburg. His last years were marred by the grievances over the involvement of his eldest son, Levan, in an anti-Russian rebellion of the Ossetians in 1810. In vain Iulon tried to secure the safe surrender of his rebellious son, who was eventually murdered by the Lezgin brigands in 1812. Iulon outlived him by four years and died of stroke in 1816. He was buried at the Alexander Nevsky Monastery.

== Family ==
In 1785, Prince Iulon married Salome (1766 – 2 February 1827), daughter of Prince Revaz Amilakhvari. The couple had ten children, of whom only four survived to adulthood, and none of their children had issue. Their children were:

- Princess Irina;
- Prince Levan (1786–1812), who led an uprising against Russian rule in 1810 and was killed in 1812 while trying to escape into Ottoman territory;
- Prince Luarsab (1789–1850);
- Princess Tamar (1791–1857);
- Princess Nino, who died young;
- Princess Nino (younger), who died young;
- Prince Solomon, who died young;
- Prince Dimitri (1803–1845);
- Prince Simon, who died young;
- Princess Mariam, who died young.

== Ancestry ==
Ancestors of Prince Iulon of Georgia

16. Prince David of Kakheti
8. Heraclius I of Kakheti
17. Elene Diasamidze
4. Teimuraz II
18. Shermazan Cholokashvili
9. Ana Cholokashvili
2. Heraclius II of Georgia
20. Prince Levan of Kartli
10. Vakhtang VI
21. Tuta Gurieli
5. Tamar of Kartli
22. Kelchiko of Kabarda
11. Rusudan of Circassia
1. Iulon
24. George IV Dadiani
12. Bezhan Dadiani
25. Sevdia Mikeladze
6. Katsia-Giorgi Dadiani
26. Gelovani
13. Tamar Gelovani
3. Darejan Dadiani
