= Batonishvili =

Title given to the sons and daughters of kings of Georgia

Batonishvili (Georgian: ბატონიშვილი, lit. 'a child of a lord or sovereign') is a title for royal princes and princesses who descend from the Kings of Georgia from the Bagrationi dynasty.

Batonishvili is suffixed after or before the given names e.g. David Batonishvili or Batonishvili Ioane, etc.

== History ==
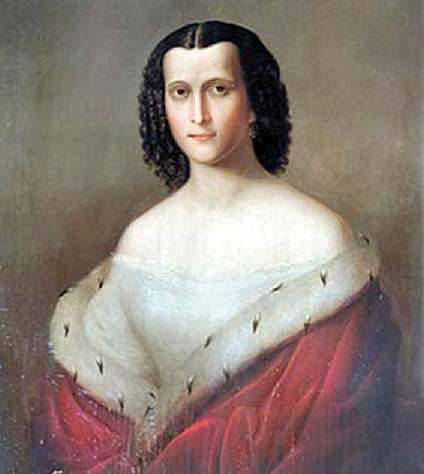
Left: A seal of 9- or 10-year-old royal prince Erekle (future King Erekle II), written in Asomtavruli script reading "Batonishvili Erekle".
Right: Batonishvili Nino, a granddaughter of King Erekle II.

The title was eventually borne not only by the children of the reigning king (mepe), but by all male-line descendants of past kings. The customary attribute or form of address for a batonishvili was uganatlebulesi (უგანათლებულესი 'Most Brilliant' or 'Most High').

There were several types of noble in the monarchies of the Caucasus, some exercising more or less sovereign authority at times, whose titles are prone to be confused with the title and rank of Batonishvili when translated from Georgian into other languages. This is partially because there were no precise Western equivalents for those titles, and partially because they all came to be translated by the Russian word for prince, knyaz, as Russia increasingly dominated the region.

A list of Georgian titled families was attached to the 1783 Treaty of Georgievsk between Georgia and Russia pursuant to Article IX's promise that Russia would allow those families to "...enjoy all the same privileges and advantages granted to the Russian nobility". Inexplicably, the list did not differentiate among the ranks of the families included therein (although they were apparently listed in descending order of rank). Russia eventually added all of them to the Fifth Book of Nobility, wherein were already included nobles that held the title of prince but who had no claim to sovereign or quasi-sovereign rank. The first family named on the treaty's list was that of Bagrationi, to which belonged Georgia's king and agnates, but henceforth they and all of the other families were accorded the title of knyaz and the rank of ordinary nobleman in Russia.

In fact, members of the Kartli (including Mukhranian progeny of King Vakhtang V), Kakheti, and Imereti branches of the Bagrationi dynasty all bore the title of batonishvili in Georgia and had descendants living in Russia in the 19th century. The heirs of Kakheti and Imereti had been deported to Russia after their kingdoms were annexed in 1801 and 1810 respectively. Yet at the Russian court they were allowed to bear the Russian title equivalent to Batonishvili, Tsarevich, until 1833, the year following the abortive 1832 Georgian plot to restore the Georgian crown which had been led by Alexandre Batonishvili. Henceforth Georgia's royal heirs and their descendants were demoted to Knyaz, as Prince Gruzinsky and Prince Imeretinsky, respectively.

== See also ==
- Porphyrogénnētos, Byzantine prince royal
- Mirza, Persian prince royal
- Tsarevich, Russian prince royal
