= 1832 Georgian plot =

Conspiracy involving Georgian royalty and nobility

1832 Georgian plot (Georgian: 1832 წლის შეთქმულება, romanized: 1832 ts'lis shetkmuleba) was a political conspiracy involving Georgian royalty and nobility to restore Georgian statehood and its Bagrationi monarchy through an assassination of the Russian imperial administration.

== History ==
Eastern Georgian monarchy of the Kingdom of Kartli-Kakheti was annexed by the Russian Empire in 1801, breaking the terms of the Treaty of Georgievsk. Members of the royal Bagrationi dynasty were deported to the Russian provinces, and Russian control was acknowledged in 1813 by the Treaty of Gulistan. The Georgians, unsatisfied with the Russian rule, yearned for the removal of Russian dominance and the return of their royal dynasty. The goal of independence was kept alive principally by Prince Okropir of Georgia, a son of the last eastern Georgian monarch, George XII. Okropir and other Georgians held gatherings of Georgian students in Moscow and St. Petersburg, trying to inspire them with patriotic feeling towards their country under Russian rule. It resulted in creation of a secret society in Tbilisi whose main goal was the re-establishment of an independent kingdom under the dethroned Bagrationi. Okropir himself visited Georgia in 1830, and held talks with the principal conspirators, who included members of Georgian aristocrats from the Orbeliani and Eristavi princely houses, as well as the philosopher Solomon Dodashvili. The plot was also supported by the Georgians from western Georgia, i.e. from the Russian-abolished Kingdom of Imereti as well as the members of the House of Shervashidze that ruled Abkhazia.

Most of the Georgian conspirators were not liberal republicans, but rather monarchists and nationalists. It was proposed to invite the Russian commander-in-chief in Georgia together with other members of their administration to a grand ball in Tbilisi and at a given signal they would all be assassinated. The Georgians would then seize the Daryal Pass to prevent Russian reinforcements, and Prince Aleksandre of Georgia, son of the Georgian king Erekle II would return from Persia to be proclaimed king of Georgia.

The ball at which the Russian officers and administration members were to be killed was scheduled for 20 November 1832, but it was unexpectedly postponed, first to 9 December, then to 20 December. Early in December the whole affair was revealed to the authorities by one of the conspirators, Prince Iese Palavandishvili, and all of them were arrested. Ten of the accused conspirators were sentenced to death but later reprieved and deported to distant Russian provinces instead, largely because of their aristocratic status. The 1832 plot, though unsuccessful, would play an important role in the future national liberation movement that Georgians would seek to organize more fruitfully.

== Bibliography ==
- Ronald Grigor Suny (1994) The Making of the Georgian Nation, Indiana University Press, ISBN 978-0253209153
