= Prince Grigol of Georgia =

Grigol Gruzinsky
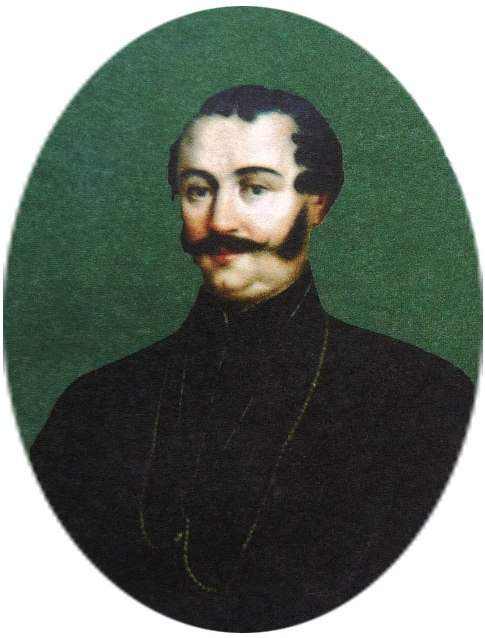

Head of the Royal House of Georgia
- Tenure: 15 February 1830 – 21 September 1830
- Predecessor: Prince Ioane of Georgia
- Successor: Bagrat Gruzinsky
- Born: 24 January 1789; Tbilisi, Kingdom of Kartli-Kakheti
- Died: 21 September 1830 (aged 41); Tbilisi, Russian Empire
- Burial: Alexander Nevsky Monastery
- Spouse: Varvara Feodorovna Bukrinskaya (m. 1824)
- Issue: Prince David; Prince Ioane; Princess Ketevan; Princess Ekaterine
- Dynasty: Bagrationi
- Father: Prince Ioane of Georgia
- Mother: Ketevan Tsereteli
- Religion: Georgian Orthodox Church

Grigol (Georgian: გრიგოლი, romanized: grigoli; Russian: Григорий Иоаннович Грузинский, Grigory Ioannovich Gruzinsky) (24 January 1789 – 21 September 1830) was a Georgian royal prince (batonishvili) of the Bagrationi dynasty. A grandson of George XII, the last king of Georgia, and the only son of Prince Ioane of Georgia, he was briefly proclaimed as King of Georgia during a revolt against the Russian rule in 1812. After spending several months in a Russian prison, Grigol joined the Russian military ranks and took part in the 1813 Polish campaign. He is the author of several poems, memoirs, and a compilation of Georgian poetry.

== Biography ==
Grigol was born in Tbilisi into the family of Prince Ioane of Georgia and his wife Princess Ketevan Tsereteli. He was the only great grandchild of the penultimate Georgian king Heraclius II to be born in this ruler's lifetime. In 1801 the Russian Empire annexed the Kingdom of Kartli-Kakheti and began deporting members of the late king George XII's family to Russia proper. In 1803 Prince Ioane, Grigol's father, settled in Saint Petersburg, but Grigol stayed with his mother at the Tsereteli estate in Imereti.

In January 1812, the eastern Georgian province of Kakheti, from where the last kings of Georgia traced their provenance, rose in rebellion against the Russian rule. Prince Grigol, accompanied by Prince Simon Machabeli, immediately hurried to join the rebels. Machabeli was captured by General Stahl's soldiers, but Grigol escaped and crossed into Kakheti. Arrival of the royal prince brought more cohesion in this largely peasant movement. His appeal to the memories of the suppressed royal dynasty garnered further support among the population of eastern Georgia and Grigol was proclaimed king on 20 February 1812. By the end of February, the Russian army under the overall command of Filippo Paulucci had gained an upper hand. After the defeat at Chumlaki on 1 March, Grigol fled to the Avars, but, under the persuasion of Prince Zaza Andronikashvili, he surrendered to the Russian military on 6 March 1812. Prince Grigol was sent for imprisonment to Petrozavodsk, where he sought consolation for his disappointment and homesickness in writing poems.

Pardoned a year later, Grigol entered the Russian military service and took part in the concluding phases of the Napoleonic Wars, particularly, the 1813 Polish campaign, of which he left an account. Grigol continued his military service, rising to the rank of podpolkovnik (lieutenant colonel) of the Astrakhan Cossack Regiment. After retirement from the army, he lived in St. Petersburg, focusing on compiling an anthology of Georgian poetry. He died there, at the age of 41, and was buried at the Alexander Nevsky Lavra. Niko Javakhishvili, a historian at Tbilisi State University, suggested in 2008 to include Grigol in the list of the kings of Georgia as Gregory I.

== Family ==
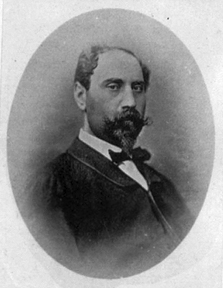
Prince Ivan Gruzinsky (1826–1880)

Prince Grigol married on 28 January 1824, during his visit to Tbilisi, Varvara Feodorovna Bukrinskaya (10 December 1810 – 29 November 1876), a Georgia-born daughter of a Russian bureaucrat. They had two sons and two daughters, recognized in 1833 by the Russian government in the title of Princes and Princesses Gruzinsky, with the addition of the style "Serene Highness" since 1865.

- Prince David (born 28 December 1824), whose subsequent fate is unknown.
- Prince Ioane (Ivan; 24 June 1826 – 15 September 1880), subsequently an unofficial head of the Georgian royal family and collector of Georgian antiquities. He married in 1850 Countess Ekaterina Pahlena, daughter of General Count Pavel Pahlen, and died without issue.
- Princess Ketevan (1828–1891), who married, in 1849, General Prince Mikhail Sumbatashvili (1822–1886). She had seven children.
- Princess Ekaterine (1830–1917), Lady-in-waiting of the Imperial Court of Russia. She died unmarried.

== Ancestry ==
Ancestors of Prince Grigol of Georgia

16. Teimuraz II
8. Heraclius II of Georgia
17. Tamar of Kartli
4. George XII
18. Zaal Abashidze
9. Anna Abashidze
2. Prince Ioane of Georgia
20. Iese Andronikashvili
10. Papuna Andronikashvili
5. Ketevan Andronikashvili
1. Grigol
12. Zurab Tsereteli
6. Zurab Tsereteli
3. Ketevan Tsereteli
