= Prince Bagrat of Georgia =

Prince of Georgia (1776–1841)

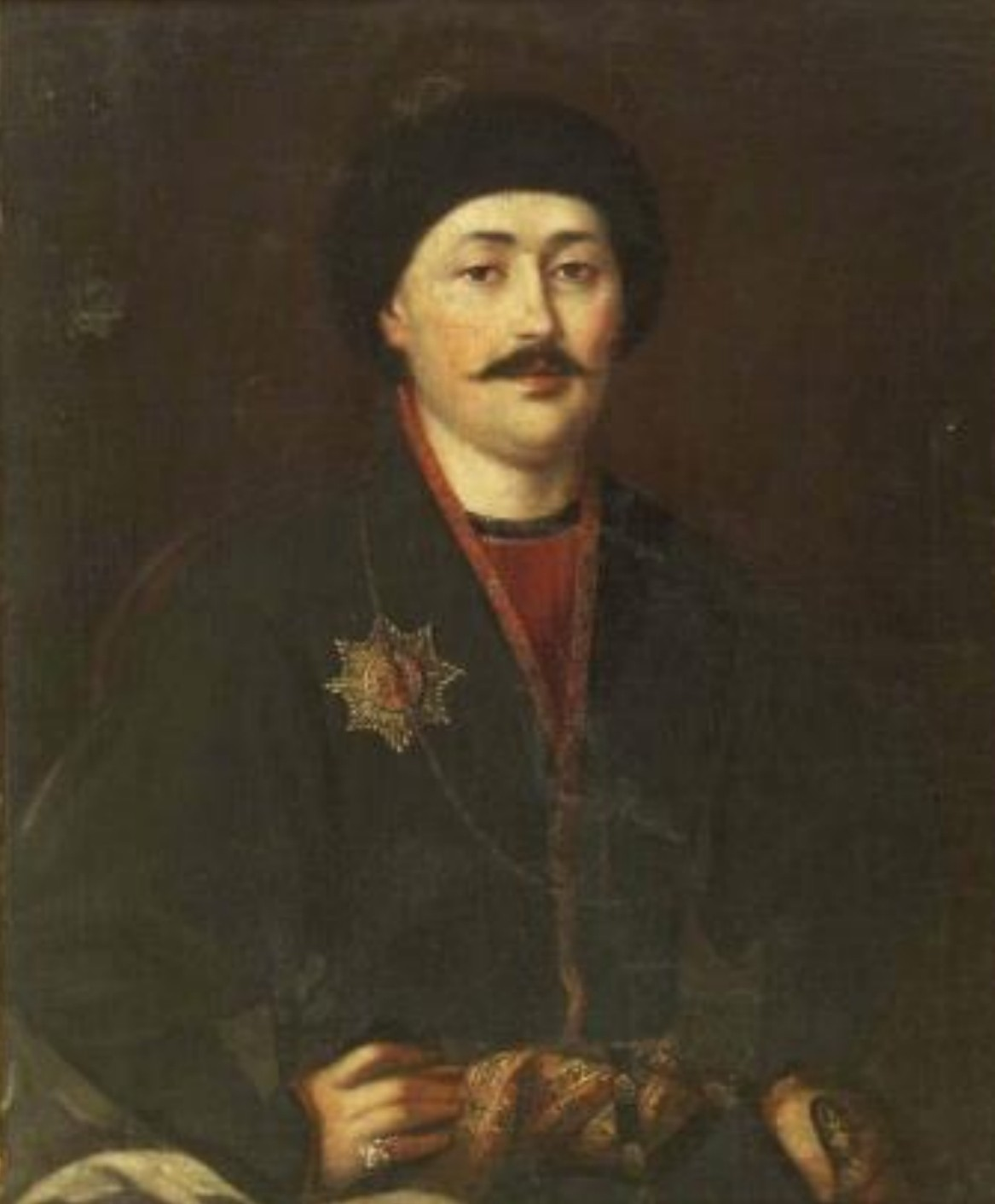
- Prince Bagrat, second half of the 18th century.

Head of the Royal House of Georgia
- Tenure: 21 September 1830 – 8 May 1841
- Predecessor: Grigol Gruzinsky
- Successor: Alexander Bagratovich Gruzinsky

Duke of Ksani
- Reign: 1790–1801
- Predecessor: Prince George
- Alongside: Prince Ioane (1790–1801); Prince Iulon (1790–1801)
- Born: 8 May 1776; Tbilisi, Kingdom of Kartli-Kakheti
- Died: 8 May 1841 (aged 65); St. Petersburg, Russian Empire
- Burial: Smolensky Cemetery
- Spouse: Ketevan Cholokashvili
- Issue Among others: David; Alexander
- House: Bagrationi
- Father: George XII of Georgia
- Mother: Ketevan Andronikashvili
- Religion: Georgian Orthodox Church
- Khelrtva

Bagrat (Georgian: ბაგრატი) (8 May 1776 – 8 May 1841) was a Georgian royal prince (batonishvili) of the Bagrationi dynasty and an author. A son of King George XII of Georgia, Bagrat occupied important administrative posts in the last years of the Georgian monarchy, after whose abolition by the Russian Empire in 1801 he entered the imperial civil service. He was known in Russia as the tsarevich Bagrat Georgievich Gruzinsky (Russian: Багра́т Гео́ргиевич Грузи́нский). He is the author of works in the history of Georgia, veterinary medicine and economics. Bagrat is the forefather of the surviving descendants of the last kings of Georgia.

== Life in Georgia ==
Bagrat was born in Tbilisi into the family of Crown Prince George, the future king George XII, and his first wife Ketevan Andronikashvili. In 1790, Bagrat, then aged 14, received a princely domain in the Ksani valley after his reigning grandfather, Heraclius II, dispossessed the defiant Kvenipneveli dynasty of the duchy of Ksani, dividing it into three parts. Other parts of the duchy were granted to Bagrat's elder brother Ioane and half-uncle Iulon. In addition, during the reign of his father George XII (r. 1798–1800), Bagrat received Kakheti in possession. Around the same time, he became involved in a dynastic feud among the numerous posterity of Heraclius II and George XII. In November 1800, Bagrat was one of the commanders of a combined Russo-Georgian force that defeated the joint invasion by the Avar Khan Umma and Bagrat's own paternal half-uncle Alexander on the Battle of Niakhura in Kakheti.

== Life in Russia ==
After George XII's death in 1800, the arrival of the Russian rule brought the Bagrationi rule to an end. The members of the Georgian royal family were deprived of their estates and deported to Russia proper. Unlike many of his royal relatives, Bagrat did not take arms against the Russian regime and, in 1803, accepted his exile in Moscow, which he left the day before the city's occupation by the French troops in 1812, and then in Saint Petersburg, where he would live until his death. He was made a chamberlain of the Russian tsar Alexander I in 1818 and became a Privy Councillor and Senator of the empire in 1828.

During his life in Russia, Bagrat composed a continuation of the Georgian history written by his brother David, covering the period from the middle of the 18th century to the 1840s. He also compiled a list of Georgians fighting in the Russian ranks against Napoleonic France in 1812. He also authored memoirs and the first Georgian-language book in veterinary medicine, published in Saint Petersburg in 1818.

== Family ==
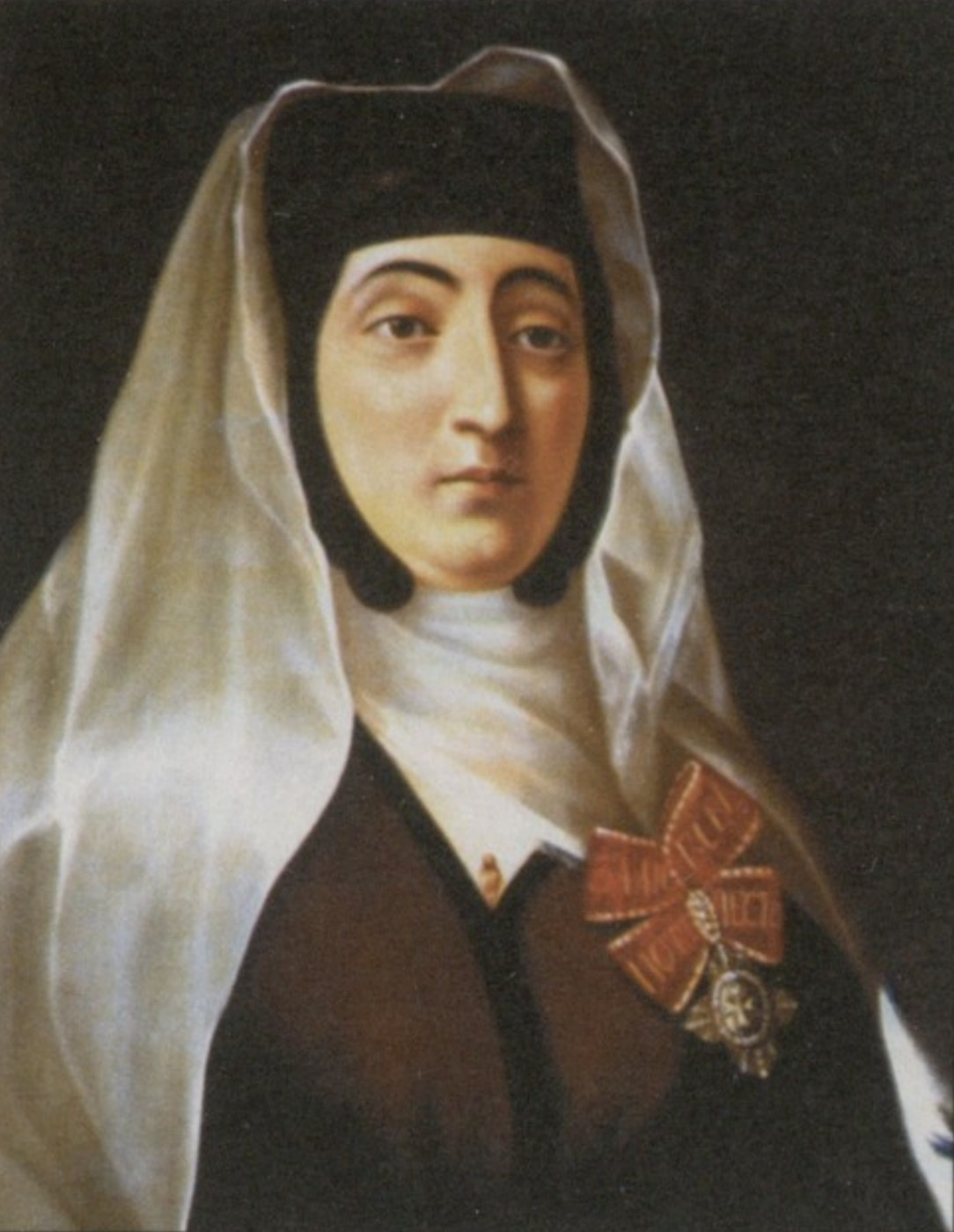
Ekaterine (Ketevan) Cholokashvili, wife of Bagrat.

Prince Bagrat was married to Princess Ekaterine (Ketevan) Cholokashvili (1781 – 30 June 1831), a daughter of Prince Durmishkhan Cholokashvili, sometime bailiff (mouravi) of Pshavi and Khevsureti. She died of cholera in St. Petersburg and was buried at the Smolensky Cemetery. Bagrat and Ekaterina were the parents of ten children, of whom only three reached adulthood:

- Prince Spiridon (1800 – died in infancy).
- Princess Barbare (Varvara Bagratovna Gruzinskaya) (1804–1870), married Lieutenant-General Prince Dimitri Orbeliani.
- Princess Daria (Daria Bagratovna Gruzinskaya) (1808–1809).
- Prince Petre (Pyotr Bagratovich Gruzinsky) (1811–1812).
- Prince Giorgi (Georgy Bagratovich Gruzinsky) (1812–c. 1816).
- Princess Elisabed (Elizaveta Bagratovna Gruzinskaya) (1813–1815).
- Prince Nikoloz (Nikolay Bagratovich Gruzinsky) (1816–1833).
- Prince Konstantine (Konstantin Bagratovich Gruzinsky) (born 1817).
- Prince David (David Bagratovich Gruzinsky) (30 April 1819 – 24 September 1888), an unofficial head of the Georgian royal house (1880–1888). He was married to Anna Alekseyevna Mazurina (11 January 1824 – 10 August 1866), with one son, Spiridon (born 1861).
- Prince Alexander (Alexander Bagratovich Gruzinsky) (1820–1865).

== Ancestry ==
Ancestors of Prince Bagrat of Georgia

16. Heraclius I of Kakheti
8. Teimuraz II
17. Ana Cholokashvili
4. Heraclius II of Georgia
18. Vakhtang VI
9. Tamar of Kartli
19. Rusudan of Circassia
2. George XII
20. Zurab Abashidze
10. Zaal Abashidze
5. Anna Abashidze
1. Bagrat
24. Melkisedek Andronikashvili
12. Iese Andronikashvili
6. Papuna Andronikashvili
3. Ketevan Andronikashvili

== Bibliography ==
- Gvosdev, Nikolas K. (2000). Imperial policies and perspectives towards Georgia, 1760-1819. New York: St. Martin's Press in association with St. Antony's College, Oxford. ISBN 0312229909.
- Думин, С. В. (1996). Дворянские роды Российской империи. Том 3. Князья (in Russian). М.: Линкоминвест.
- ხანთაძე, შ. (1977). "ბაგრატ ბატონიშვილი". Georgian Soviet Encyclopedia (in Georgian). Vol. 2. Tbilisi: Main Scientific Editorial Office. p. 130.
