= David Gruzinsky =

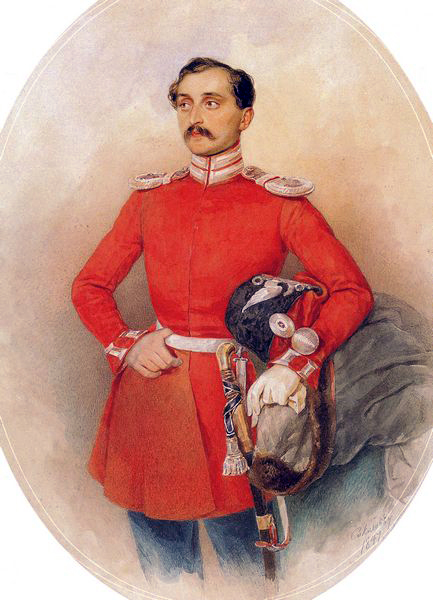
- Prince royal David by Pyotr Sokolov
- Born: 30 April 1819
- Died: September 24, 1888 (aged 69); Moscow, Russian Empire
- Burial: Intercession Monastery (Moscow)
- Spouse: Anna Alekseyevna Mazurina
- Issue: Spiridon Gruzinsky
- House: Bagrationi dynasty
- Father: Prince Bagrat of Georgia
- Mother: Princess Ketevan Cholokashvili
- Religion: Georgian Orthodox Church

David (Georgian: დავითი; 30 April 1819 – 24 September 1888) was a Georgian royal prince (batonishvili) of the Bagrationi dynasty. Son of Prince Bagrat of Georgia, grandson of King George XII of Georgia. He was known in Russia as the tsarevich David Bagratovich Gruzinsky (Russian: Давид Багратович Грузинский). He was married to Anna Alekseyevna Mazurina with whom he had one son, Spiridon, who died in infancy. David died in Moscow.

== Ancestry ==
Ancestors of David Gruzinsky

16. Teimuraz II
8. Heraclius II of Georgia
17. Princess Tamara of Kartli
4. George XII
18. Prince Zaal Abashidze
9. Princess Anna Abashidze
2. Prince Bagrat of Georgia
20. Prince Iese Andronikashvili
10. Prince Papuna Andronikashvili
5. Princess Ketevan Andronikashvili
1. Prince David Gruzinsky
6. Prince Durmishkhan Cholokashvili
3. Princess Ketevan Cholokashvili
