= Battle of Ghartiskari =

Military engagement in eastern Georgia (1778)

- Part of Lekianoba
Date	October 1778
Location	Ghartiskari, Kingdom of Kartli-Kakheti
Result	Georgian victory

Belligerents
Kingdom of Kartli-Kakheti	Lezgin marauders

Commanders and leaders
Ketevan Andronikashvili	Unknown

Strength
300 royal guard cavalry	500–800 mounted raiders

Casualties and losses
Light	Heavy

The Battle of Ghartiskari (Georgian: ღართისკარის ბრძოლა; Lezgian: Гьартискаридин Дяве) was a minor engagement fought in October 1778 in eastern Georgia during the reign of King Heraclius II. It occurred when Lezgins attacked the escort of Ketevan Andronikashvili, a Georgian noblewoman and daughter-in-law of the king. Despite the inexperience of her escort, Andronikashvili took command and repelled the attackers, and the event was followed by a ceremonial reception in Tbilisi.

== Battle ==
In October 1778, Ketevan Andronikashvili, daughter of the mourav of Kiziki and daughter-in-law of Heraclius II through her marriage to Prince George, was traveling from Shida Kartli to Tbilisi when she was attacked near Ghartiskari by a force of 500 (or 800) Lezgins.

She was accompanied by 300 soldiers serving as her escort. As there were no experienced soldiers among them, she took command of her troops, rallied them, and engaged the attackers. The Lezgins were defeated, and many were killed. Upon hearing the news, Heraclius II received Ketevan in Tbilisi with honors, including artillery salutes, and the city was illuminated.

== Bibliography ==
- Brosset, Marie-Félicité (1857). Histoire moderne de la Géorgie [Modern History of Georgia] (in French). Saint Petersburg: Imperial Academy of Sciences.
