= Prince Teimuraz of Georgia =

Prince Teimuraz
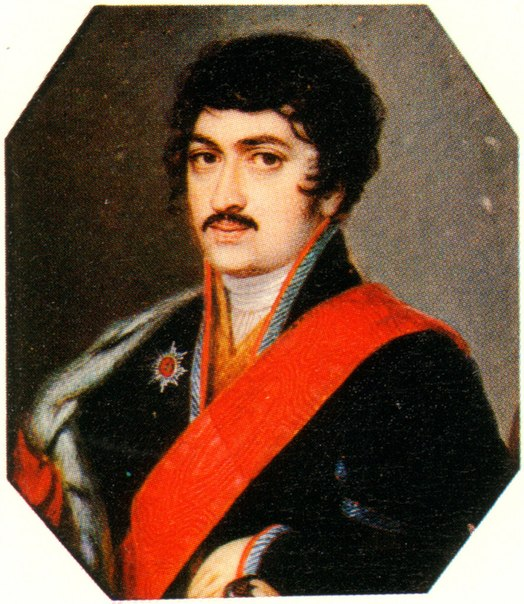
- Born: 23 April 1782; Tbilisi, Kingdom of Kartli-Kakheti
- Died: 25 October 1846 (aged 64); Saint Petersburg, Russian Empire
- Burial: Alexander Nevsky Lavra
- Spouse: Elene Amilakhvari
- Dynasty: Bagrationi dynasty
- Father: George XII
- Mother: Ketevan Andronikashvili
- Religion: Georgian Orthodox Church
- Khelrtva

Teimuraz Bagrationi (Georgian: თეიმურაზ ბაგრატიონი), otherwise known as Tsarevich Teimuraz Georgievich (Russian: царевич Теймураз Георгиевич; 23 April 1782 – 25 October 1846), was a Georgian royal prince (batonishvili) and scholar primarily known as an author of the first critical history in Georgian as well as for his work to popularize interest in the history and culture of Georgia and preserve its treasures.

== Biography ==
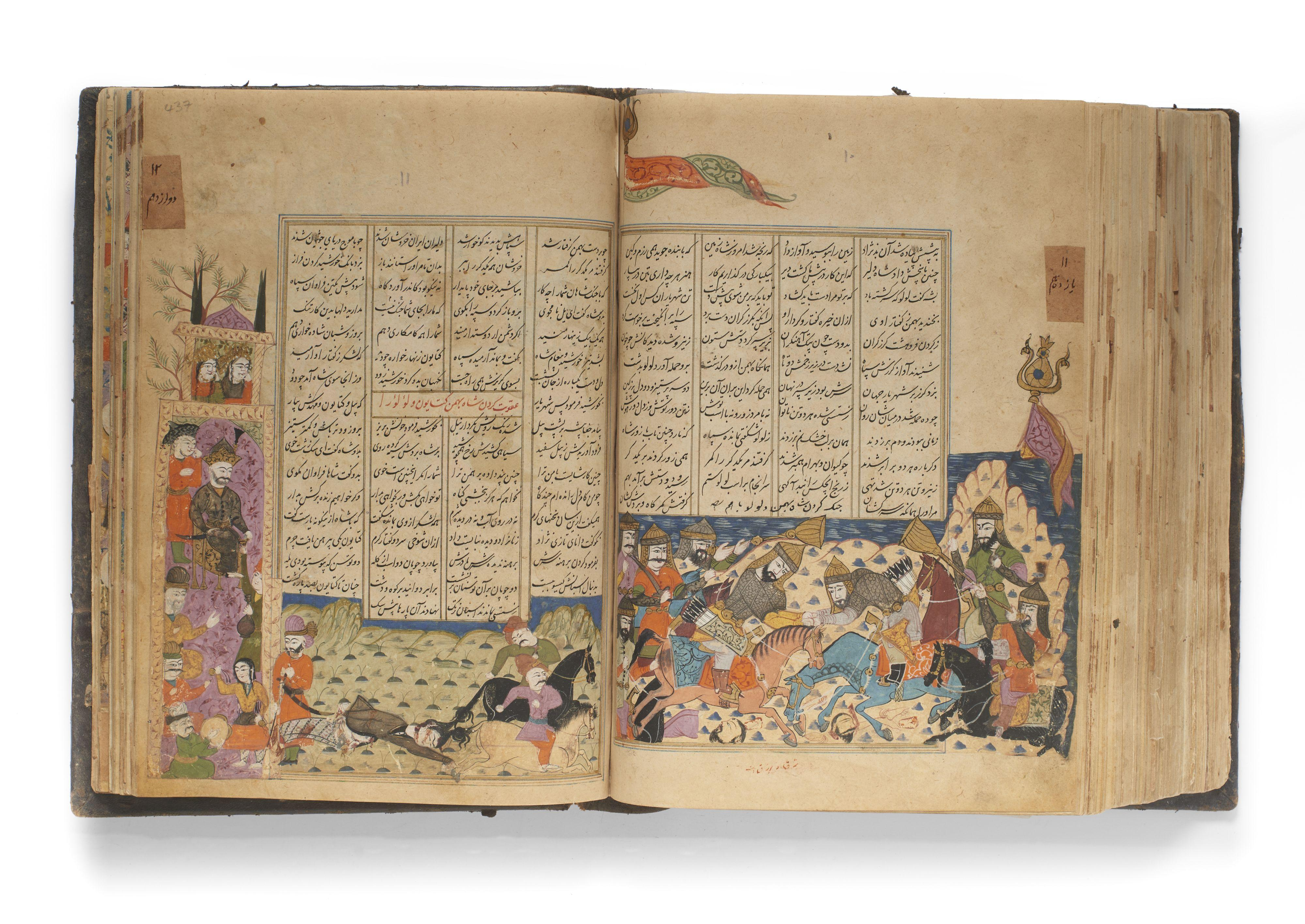
An illustrated Persian manuscript containing Ferdowsi's Shahnameh and Iranshah's Bahmannameh, originally in the possession of Prince Teimuraz. The manuscript was created in 17th-century Safavid Iran, with later (possibly 18th-19th century) additions

Prince Teimuraz was born in Tbilisi to Heir Apparent George, subsequently the last king of Georgia (Kingdom of Kartli and Kakheti) from 1798 to 1800, and his wife, Ketevan Andronikashvili. He studied at the Telavi Seminary, and, at the age of 13, took part in the 1795 Battle of Krtsanisi at which his grandfather, King Heraclius II of Georgia, was defeated by a Persian invading army under Agha Mohammad Khan Qajar. Teimuraz did not accept the Russian annexation of Georgia of 1801, which followed shortly after his father's death and fled to Persia, whence his uncle, Alexander fought to expel the Russians from Georgia. During the Russo-Persian War (1804-1813), Teimuraz, who was known as Tahmures Mirza in Persia, served as a Persian artillery commander. On October 16, 1810, however, he surrendered to the Russian authorities. On January 12, 1811, he settled in St Petersburg where he was granted a state salary and pension. In 1813, he acquired a mansion on Vasilievsky Island and concentrated on scholarly work. He collected and researched old Georgian chronicles and analyzed Greco-Roman and Armenian sources on Georgia. He was a collaborator and friend of Marie-Félicité Brosset, a French scholar, whom he frequently consulted on the history of Georgia. At the same time, Prince Teiumraz befriended and tutored the young Georgian students in St Petersburg – Platon Ioseliani, and David Chubinashvili – both of whom eventually became prolific Georgian historians.

In the 1830s-1840s, he composed two major works on the early history of Georgia – "ისტორია დაწყებითგან ივერიისა, ესე იგი გიორგიისა, რომელ არს სრულიად საქართველოჲსა" (1832, History of Iberia or Georgia, that is All of Sakartvelo) and "ისტორია ძველი კოლხიდისა" (1840, History of Ancient Colchis) – and wrote commentaries to the 12th-century Georgian national epic "The Knight in the Panther's Skin" ("განმარტება პოემა ვეფხისტყაოსანისა", 1843). His articles were published in the Paris-based Journal Asiatique and Memoires inedits. He was elected an honorary member of the French Societe Asiatique (1831), the Russian Imperial Academy of Sciences (1837) and the Danish Royal Antiquarian Society (1838). Prince Teimuraz also authored several poems, and a memoir of his European travels as well as the Georgian translations of Tacitus, Voltaire, and Pushkin.

He died in Saint Petersburg and was buried there at the Alexander Nevsky Lavra.

== Ancestry ==
Ancestors of Prince Teimuraz of Georgia

8. Teimuraz II
4. Heraclius II of Georgia
9. Tamar of Kartli
2. George XII of Georgia
10. Zaal Abashidze
5. Anna Abashidze
1. Teimuraz
12. Iese Andronikashvili
6. Papuna Andronikashvili
3. Ketevan Andronikashvili
