= Prince Ioane of Georgia =

Prince Ioane
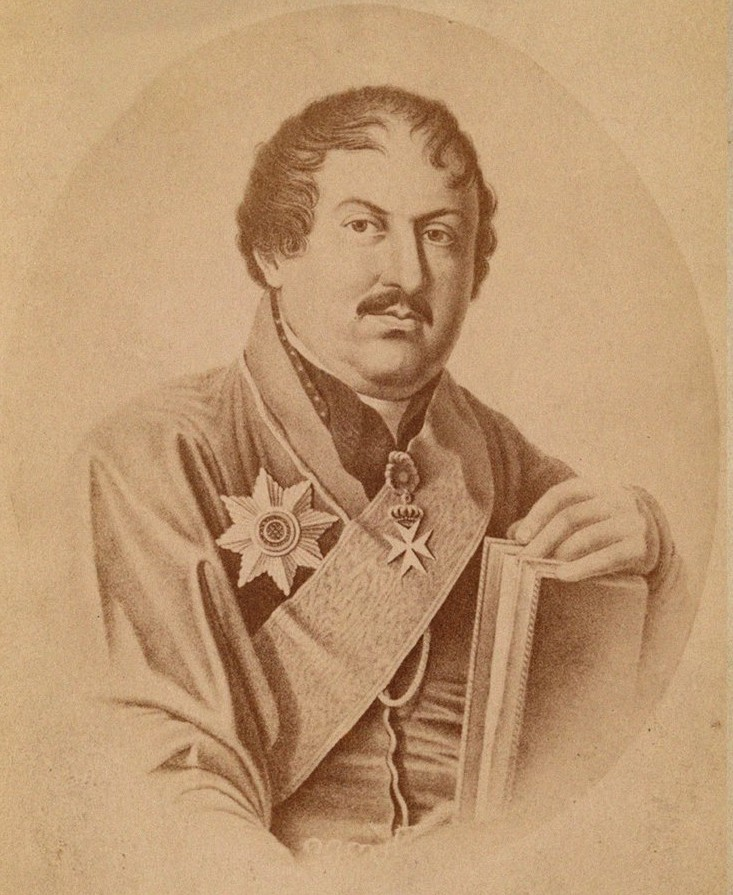
- A portrait of Prince Ioane by anonymous artist, photographed by Alexander Roinashvili.

Head of the Royal House of Georgia
- Tenure: 13 May 1819 – 15 February 1830
- Predecessor: David Bagrationi
- Successor: Grigol Gruzinsky

Duke of Ksani
- Reign: 1790–1801
- Predecessor: Prince George
- With: Prince Iulon (1790–1801); Prince Bagrat (1790–1801)
- Born: 16 May 1768; Tbilisi, Kingdom of Kartli-Kakheti
- Died: 15 February 1830 (aged 61); Saint Petersburg, Russian Empire
- Burial: Alexander Nevsky Monastery
- Spouse: Ketevan Tsereteli (m. 1787)
- Issue: Prince Grigol
- Dynasty: Bagrationi
- Father: George XII
- Mother: Ketevan Andronikashvili
- Religion: Georgian Orthodox Church
- Occupation: writer and encyclopedist
- Khelrtva

Ioane (Georgian: იოანე ბაგრატიონი) (16 May 1768 – 15 February 1830) was a Georgian prince (batonishvili), writer, lexicographer and encyclopaedist.

== Biography ==
A son of George XII, the last king of Kartli-Kakheti kingdom, eastern Georgia, by his first wife Ketevan Andronikashvili, Ioane commanded an avant-garde of a Georgian force annihilated by the Persian army at the Battle of Krtsanisi in 1795.

Following the battle, the kingdom entered a period of economic crisis and political anarchy. To eradicate the results of a Persian attack and to overcome the retardation of the feudal society, Prince Ioane proposed on 10 May 1799, a project of reforms of administration, army and education. This project was, however, never materialized due to the weakness of George XII and a civil strife in the country. In 1800, he commanded a Georgian cavalry in the joint Russian-Georgian forces that defeated his uncle, Alexandre Bagrationi, and the Dagestani allies at the Battle of Niakhura.

Upon the death of George XII, Kartl-Kakheti was incorporated into the expanding Russian Empire, and Ioane was deported to Russia. He settled in Saint Petersburg where he wrote most of his works with a didactic encyclopedic novel Kalmasoba (1817–1828) being the most important of them.

He is also an author of a naturalist encyclopedia (1814), a children encyclopedia (1829), a Russian-Georgian dictionary, a Georgian lexicon, and of several poems.

His manuscripts were discovered in 1861 by a Georgian scholar, Dimitri Bakradze, who published them in an abridged version in 1862.

== Biography ==
In 1787, Prince Ioane married Ketevan (1772–1832), daughter of Prince Zurab Tsereteli, Mayor of the Palace (sakhltukhutsesi) of Imereti. They had one son:

- Prince Grigol (1789–1830), who was briefly proclaimed King of Georgia during a brief 1812 revolt against Russian rule before joining the Russian military.

== Ancestry ==
Ancestors of Prince Ioane of Georgia

16. Heraclius I of Kakheti
8. Teimuraz II
17. Ana Cholokashvili
4. Heraclius II of Georgia
18. Vakhtang VI
9. Tamar of Kartli
19. Rusudan of Circassia
2. George XII
20. Zurab Abashidze
10. Zaal Abashidze
5. Anna Abashidze
1. Ioane
24. Melkisedek Andronikashvili
12. Iese Andronikashvili
6. Papuna Andronikashvili
3. Ketevan Andronikashvili
