= Prince David of Georgia =

Heir apparent and regent of Georgia (1767–1819)

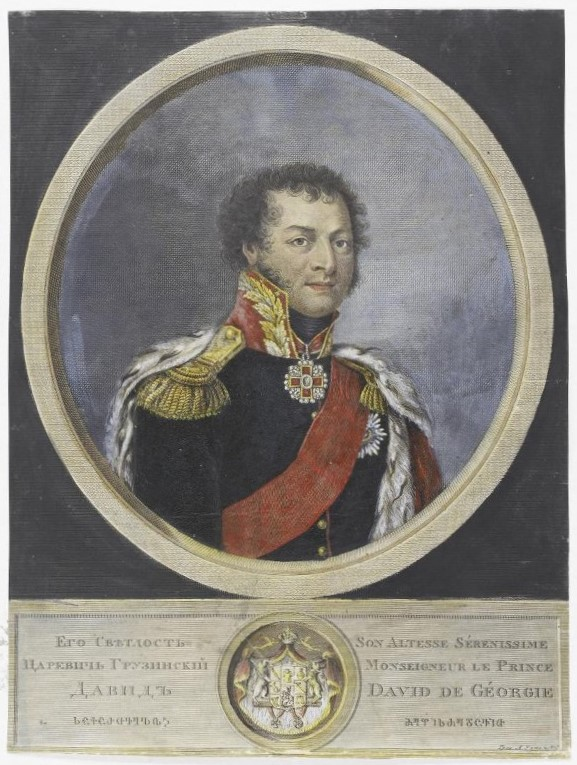

Regent of Georgia
- Reign: 28 December 1800 – 18 January 1801

Head of the Royal House of Georgia
- Tenure: 28 December 1800 – 13 May 1819
- Predecessor: George XII
- Successor: Ioane Bagrationi
- Born: 1 July 1767; Tbilisi, Kingdom of Kartli-Kakheti
- Died: 13 May 1819 (aged 51); St Petersburg, Russian Empire
- Burial: Feodorovskaya Church, Alexander Nevsky Monastery
- Spouse: Helen Abamelik (m. 1800)
- Dynasty: Bagrationi
- Father: George XII
- Mother: Ketevan Andronikashvili
- Religion: Georgian Orthodox Church
- Khelrtva

David (Georgian: დავით, romanized: davit), also known as David XII (Georgian: დავით XII, romanized: davit XII) or David the Regent (Georgian: დავით გამგებელი, Davit Gamgebeli; 1 July 1767 – 13 May 1819), was a Georgian royal prince (batonishvili), writer, scholar, and regent of the Kingdom of Kartl-Kakheti from 28 December 1800 to 18 January 1801.

== Biography ==
The eldest son of the last Kartli-Kakhetian, King George XII by his first wife Ketevan Andronikashvili, he was educated in Russia (1787–1789), and served there as a colonel of the Russian army from 1797 to 1798. He was proclaimed as Heir Apparent by his father on 22 February 1799 and confirmed by the Russian Tsar Paul I, an official protector of Georgia, on 18 April 1799. In 1800, he attempted to modernize the law and administration. He became a lieutenant general the same year.

On his father's death in December 1800, David became the head of the Royal House of Bagrationi but was not allowed to ascend the throne of Kartli-Kakheti. David ruled briefly between the time of his father's death (28 December 1800) and the arrival of General Knorring (24 May 1801). In November 1800 the Russian Tsar had prohibited him from doing that without Russian consent. On 18 January 1801, he was surprised by a decree of Paul I declaring the annexation of the Kingdom to the Russian Empire. He tried to remain in power as de facto head of state. In May 1801, Russian General Karl Knorring removed him from power and established a provisional government headed by General Ivan Petrovich Lasarev. Prince David was brought to St Petersburg under a military escort on 18 February 1803. From 1812 to 1819, he held a seat in the Senate of the Russian Empire.

He married in 1800 Princess Elene Abamelek (1770—1836), and died childless in 1819. He was buried at the Alexander Nevsky Monastery.

Influenced by the ideas of French Enlightenment, he was the first Georgian translator of Voltaire. He was also an author of a research on Georgian history (Georgian, 1814), Review of the Georgian Law (Russian, 1811—1816), Abridged Manual of Physics (Georgian, 1818), and several poems.

== Ancestry ==
Ancestors of Prince David of Georgia

16. Heraclius I of Kakheti
8. Teimuraz II
17. Ana Cholokashvili
4. Heraclius II of Georgia
18. Vakhtang VI
9. Tamar of Kartli
19. Rusudan of Circassia
2. George XII
20. Zurab Abashidze
10. Zaal Abashidze
5. Anna Abashidze
1. David
24. Melkisedek Andronikashvili
12. Iese Andronikashvili
6. Papuna Andronikashvili
3. Ketevan Andronikashvili

== Literature ==
- Takaishvili, E. Chronological list written by Davit Batonishvili, son of King Giorgi. Historical materials. Book two . Vol., 1912, p. 54-55;
- Georgian Soviet Encyclopedia, Vol. 3, ch., 1978. — p. 338.
- Sikharulidze F., Potskhishvili A., Encyclopedia "Georgia", vol. 2, ch., 2012. — p. 279.
