= Ketevan Andronikashvili =

Georgian noblewoman

- Born: 1754
- Died: 3 June 1782 (aged 27–28); Tbilisi, Kingdom of Kartli-Kakheti
- Burial: David Gareji
- Spouse: George XII of Georgia (m. 1766)
- Issue Among others: Prince David; Prince Ioane; Princess Nino; Prince Bagrat; Prince Teimuraz
- House: Andronikashvili
- Father: Papuna Andronikashvili
- Religion: Georgian Orthodox Church

Ketevan Andronikashvili (Georgian: ქეთევან ანდრონიკაშვილი; 1754 – 3 June 1782) was a Georgian noblewoman and the first wife of the future king George XII of Georgia. She is known for the victory of Georgian cavalry under her personal command over the Lesgian mountaineers in 1778.

== Biography ==
Princess Ketevan was born into the Andronikashvili dynasty, one of the leading noble houses of the eastern Georgian kingdom of Kakheti, claiming their descent from the Byzantine Komnenos dynasty. Her father, Prince Papuna Andronikashvili, was a royal bailiff, mouravi, of the district of Kiziqi, while the identity of her mother is unknown. She had three brothers, Melkisedek, Iese, and Revaz.

Princess Ketevan married George, the eldest son of King Heraclius II and heir to the throne of the Kingdom of Kartli and Kakheti, in 1766. The marriage helped the Andronikashvili clan, especially Ketevan's brother Revaz, advance their cause at the royal court against the rival faction patronized by Heraclius II's consort Darejan Dadiani. By 1780, Darejan's party succeeded in reducing the Andronikashvili's influence, convincing Heraclius to remove Revaz Andronikashvili from the bailiffship of Kiziqi. Years later, in 1795, Prince Revaz would prevent the Kiziqian troops from coming to aid to the beleaguered king Heraclius, desperately battling the Persians at his capital city of Tbilisi.

The 24-year-old Ketevan commanded a respect and admiration in October 1778, for her role in the action at Ghartiskari, an episode of the long-running conflict between the Georgians and the Lesgians. Encountered by a marauding band of some 500 Lesgian mountaineers on the road to Tbilisi, Ketevan personally led her entourage of 300 cavalrymen into fighting and won a victory. Upon hearing the news, Heraclius II met his daughter-in-law with full military honors at the entrance of Tbilisi. She died, aged 28, in Tbilisi in 1782 as a result of the complications of her last childbirth. She was buried at the David Gareja monastery. A year later, George married secondly to Princess Mariam Tsitsishvili.

== Children ==
The sixteen years of Ketevan's marriage with George produced twelve children: six sons and six daughters. These were:

- Prince David (1 July 1767 – 13 May 1819), regent of Kartli-Kakheti (1800–1801);
- Prince Ioane (16 May 1768 – 15 February 1830), scholar and writer;
- Princess Barbare (1769–1801), who married Prince Simon-Zosim Andronikashvili in 1784 and had three children;
- Princess Sophio (1770–1840), Lady of the Russian Order of Saint Catherine, Lesser Cross, who married Prince Luarsab Tarkhan-Mouravi in 1792, without children;
- Prince Luarsab (born 1771), who died young;
- Princess Nino (1772–1847), who married Grigol Dadiani, Prince of Mingrelia, and regent of Mingrelia (1804–1811);
- Princess Salome (c. 1773 – 3 January 1777), who married Prince Alexander of Imereti.
- Prince Bagrat (8 May 1776 – 8 May 1841), writer, senator of the Russian Empire;
- Princess Ripsime (1779 – 27 May 1847), Lady of the Russian Order of Saint Catherine, Lesser Cross, who married Prince Dimitri Cholokashvili in 1784 and had two sons;
- Prince Solomon (born 1780), who died young;
- Princess Gaiane (27 September 1780 – 22 July 1820), who married Prince George Kvenipneveli-Sidamoni in 1794 and had issue;
- Prince Teimuraz (April 23, 1782 – October 25, 1846), historian.

== Ancestry ==
Ancestors of Ketevan Andronikashvili

16. Prince Garsevan Andronikashvili
8. Prince Melkisedek Andronikashvili
4. Prince Iese Andronikashvili
2. Prince Papuna Andronikashvili
1. Princess Ketevan Andronikashvili
3. an unknown Lady
