= Tsereteli =

Noble family in Georgia

Coat of arms of Princes Tserreteli

The House of Tsereteli (Georgian: წერეთელი), is a noble family in Georgia which gave origin to several notable writers, politicians, scholars, and artists.

== History ==
According to family legend, the Tsereteli family's ancestors were chieftains in Dagestan or Ossetia who fled the Islamization of their homeland by Timur (Tamerlane) and migrated through Circassia to Christian Georgia in 1395. Modern historians, however, regard this account with skepticism, suggesting that it was fabricated by the newly ascendant family to lend greater antiquity to their lineage. The surname is believed to derive from the now-abandoned village of Tsereti, in present-day Gori Municipality, from which the family subsequently migrated to Imereti.

Constantine II, King of Imereti (west Georgia) from 1392 to 1401, enfeoffed them of Sachkhere and conferred the dignity of prince (tavadi) upon them. The Tsereteli held a fiefdom in Upper Imereti called Satseretlo (საწერეთლო; "of Tsereteli") with their residence at Modinakhe, and eventually turned into one of the preeminent aristocratic families in Georgia. They frequently intermarried with other Georgian noble houses and even with the branches of Bagrationi royal dynasty in both western and eastern Georgia (e.g., Prince David Tsereteli married the sister of Alexander V of Imereti in 1736, while Zurab Tsereteli married his daughter, Ketevan, to the royal Prince Ioane of Georgia in 1787).

A branch of the family followed King Vakhtang VI in his 1724 emigration to Imperial Russia, where they came to be known as Tsertelev (Russian: Цертелев, Церетели) and were absorbed into the Russian nobility.

== Princes of Satseretlo ==
c. 1380–1590 – Twelve anonymous princes

- Kveli I (c. 1590–1620)
- Bezhan, son (c. 1620–39)
- Kaikhosro I, son (c. 1640–60)
- Kveli II, brother (c. 1660–63)
- Kveli III, son of Kaikhosro (c. 1663–1710)
- Papuna I, son (c. 1710–38)
- Kaikhosro II, son (1738–69)
- Papuna II, son (1769–90)
- Kaikhosro III, son (1790–1810)

1810 to Russia; henceforth, princes (knyaz) Tsereteli.

== Notable members ==
- Akaki Tsereteli (1840–1915), a prominent Georgian poet and public figure
- Gigi Tsereteli (born 1964), Politician and the President of OSCE PA
- Giorgi Tsereteli (1842–1900), Georgian writer and journalist
- Giorgi Tsereteli (orientalist) (1904–1973), Georgian Orientalist
- Grigol Tsereteli (1878–1938), Georgian philologist
- Irakli Tsereteli (1882–1959), Georgian Social-Democrat politician
- Mikheil Tsereteli (1878–1965), Georgian scholar, politician, and journalist
- Tamara Tsereteli (1900–1968), Georgian singer
- Vasil Tsereteli (1862–1937), Georgian politician and physician
- Zurab Tsereteli (1934–2025), modern Russo-Georgian painter and sculptor; president of the Russian Academy of Arts
- Zurab Semyonovich Tsereteli (1953–1992), Georgian footballer
