= Eastern Georgia (country) =

Geographic region

Coordinates: 41°43′21″N 44°47′33″E

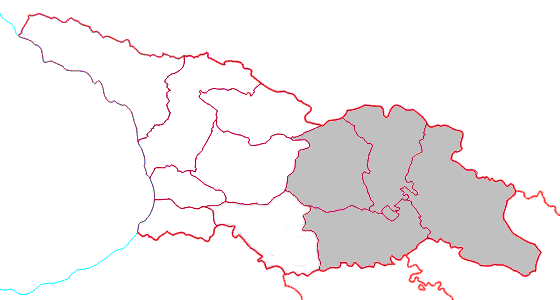
Map outlining the territory of Eastern Georgia

Eastern Georgia (Georgian: აღმოსავლეთი საქართველო, aghmosavlet'i sak'art'velo) is a geographic area encompassing the territory of the Caucasian nation of Georgia to the east and south of the Likhi and Meskheti Ranges, but excluding the Black Sea region of Adjara.

Eastern Georgia includes the historic Georgian provinces of Samtskhe, Javakheti, Kartli with the national capital city of Tbilisi, Kakheti, Pshavi, Mtiuleti, Tusheti, Khevsureti, and Khevi. Current administrative regions (mkhare) of eastern Georgia are: Samtskhe-Javakheti, Shida Kartli, Kvemo Kartli, the city of Tbilisi, Mtskheta-Mtianeti, and Kakheti.

== History ==
The regions of Kartli and Kakheti had been under Iranian suzerainty since 1555 following the Peace of Amasya signed with neighbouring rivalling Ottoman Turkey. With the death of Nader Shah in 1747, both kingdoms broke free of Iranian control and were reunified through a personal union under the energetic king Heraclius (Erekle) II in 1762. Erekle, who had risen to prominence through the Iranian ranks, was awarded the crown of Kartli by Nader himself in 1744 for his loyal service to him. Erekle nevertheless stabilized Eastern Georgia to a degree in the ensuing period and was able to guarantee its autonomy throughout the Iranian Zand period.
