= Kingdom of Kartli-Kakheti =

Georgian state in the Caucasus from 1762–1801

Kingdom of Kartli-Kakheti ქართლ-კახეთის სამეფო
- 1762–1801
- Coat of arms

- Extent of the Kingdom of Kartli-Kakheti.
- Capital: Tbilisi; 41°43′21″N 44°47′33″E
- Official languages: Georgian
- Regional languages: Armenian; Azerbaijani Turkish; Classical Persian; Pontic Greek
- Religion: State and majority Georgian Orthodox Church (Orthodox Christianity); Minority: Armenian Apostolic Church; Judaism; Shia Islam
- Government: Absolute monarchy
- King
  - 1762–1798: Heraclius II (first)
  - 1798–1800: George XII (last)
- Regent
  - 1800–1801: Prince David Bagrationi
- History
  - Unification of Kingdom of Kartli and Kingdom of Kakheti: 1762
  - De jure submission to the Zand dynasty: 1762–1763
  - Treaty of Georgievsk: July 24, 1783
  - Qajar invasion: 1795
  - Annexation to the Russian Empire: December 18, 1800
  - Ratification of Russian annexation: September 12, 1801
Preceded by
Kingdom of Kartli
Kingdom of Kakheti
Afsharid Iran
Succeeded by
Russian Empire
Qajar Iran
- Today part of: Armenia; Azerbaijan; Georgia; Russia

The Kingdom of Kartli-Kakheti (Georgian: ქართლ-კახეთის სამეფო, romanized: kartl-k'akhetis samepo) was created in 1762 by the unification of the two eastern Georgian kingdoms of Kartli and Kakheti. It was led by the Georgian royal Bagrationi dynasty.

From the 16th to 18th centuries, these two kingdoms were under Iranian suzerainty because of the spheres of influence created in the region by the Peace of Amasya and mutually agreed with the Ottoman Empire. However, following the death of Nader Shah, local Georgian monarchs Heraclius II and Teimuraz II took advantage of the resulting chaos and obtained de facto independence. Heraclius subsequently united the two smaller kingdoms into one.

To support the newly independent kingdom, in 1783 Heraclius signed the Treaty of Georgievsk with the Russian Empire, by which he formally laid Kartli-Kakheti's investiture in the hands of the Russian monarch, and made the kingdom a Russian protectorate. Amongst others, this provided a written guarantee for protection against any new attacks against Georgia by hostile foreign powers. However, by the 1790s Agha Mohammad Khan Qajar emerged as the newest threat and, after Heraclius II refused to scrap the treaty with Russia, he invaded the Georgian kingdom, capturing and sacking Tbilisi. Although this Iranian invasion was short lived, it was a humiliation for Russia. To restore Russian prestige, Catherine II, on the advice of Ivan Gudovich, belatedly declared war on Persia.

The following years, which were marked by instability, culminated in 1801 with the official annexation of the kingdom by Paul I within the Russian Empire during the nominal ascension of Heraclius's son George XII to the Kartli-Kakhetian throne. Following the Russo-Persian War of 1804–1813, Iran definitively ceded much of the Caucasus to Russia.

== History ==
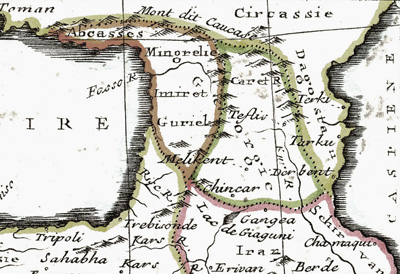
Detail from the map by Claude Buffier, 1736

After Nader Shah's death in 1747, Heraclius II and Teimuraz II capitalized on the eruption of chaos in mainland Iran. In the ensuing period Heraclius II made alliances with the khans of the area, established a leading position in the southern Caucasus, and requested Russian aid. In 1762, he succeeded his father as king of Kartli, and with already being king of Kakheti, eastern Georgia thus became politically unified for the first time in three centuries. Around 1760, it had become evident as well that Karim Khan Zand had become the new ruler of Iran. Shortly after, in 1762–1763, during Karim Khan's campaigns in Azerbaijan, Heraclius II tendered his de jure submission to him and received his investiture as vali ("governor", "viceroy") of Gorjestan (Georgia), the traditional Safavid office, which by this time however had become an "empty honorific". Karim Khan died in 1779 however, with Persia again being engulfed into chaos.

Seeking to remain independent, but also realizing that he would need a foreign protector with regard to his kingdom's foreign policy, King Heraclius II concluded the Treaty of Georgievsk with Russia in 1783, resulting in the transfer of responsibility for defense and foreign affairs in the eastern kingdom, as well as importantly, officially abjuring any dependence on Iran or any other power. However, despite these large concessions made to Russia, Heraclius II was successful in retaining internal autonomy in his kingdom.

Heraclius II's "curiously ambivalent position" in these decades is reflected in the coins issued by him in his realm. Silver coins were struck with the name of Ismail III on it, or with the Zand-style inscription ya karim ("O Gracious One"), whereby an epithet to God was invoked, which actually referred to Karim Khan Zand. These coins were minted in Tbilisi up until 1799 – some twenty years after Karim Khan Zand's death. In the same decades, the copper coins struck at Tbilisi bore three types of iconography; Christian, Georgian, "and even" Imperial Russian (such as the double-headed eagle). By minting the silver coins with a reference to Karim Khan Zand on it they were usable for trade in Iran, whereas the copper coins, struck for only local use, reflected Heraclius II's political orientation towards Russia.

=== Court and reign ===
While Heraclius II's court maintained a certain Persian-type pomp, and he himself dressed in the Persian style as well, he launched an ambitious program of "Europeanization" which was supported by the Georgian intellectual élites; it was not overwhelmingly successful however, because Georgia remained physically isolated from Europe and had to expend all available resources on defending its precarious independence. He strove to enlist the support of European powers, and to attract Western scientists and technicians to give his country the benefit of the latest military and industrial techniques. His style of governing resembled that of contemporary enlightened despots in Central Europe. He exercised executive, legislative, and judicial authority and closely supervised the activities of government departments. Heraclius's primary objective in internal policy was to further centralize the government through reducing the powers of the aristocracy. For this purpose, he attempted to create a governing élite composed of his own agents to replace the self-minded aristocratic lords in local affairs.

=== Qajar invasion ===
In the last few decades of the 18th century, Georgia had become a more important element in Russo-Iranian relations than some provinces in northern mainland Iran, such as Mazandaran or even Gilan. Unlike Peter I, Catherine, the then ruling monarch of Russia, viewed Georgia as a pivot for her Caucasian policy, as Russia's new aspirations were to use it as a base of operations against both Iran and the Ottoman Empire, both immediate bordering geo-political rivals of Russia. On top of that, having another port on the Georgian coast of the Black Sea would be ideal. A limited Russian contingent of two infantry battalions with four artillery pieces arrived in Tbilisi in 1784, but was withdrawn, despite the frantic protests of the Georgians, in 1787 as a new war against Ottoman Turkey had started on a different front.

The consequences of these events came a few years later, when a new dynasty, the Qajars, emerged victorious in the protracted power struggle in Iran. Qajar shah, Agha Mohammad Khan, as his first objective, resolved to bring the Caucasus again fully under the Iranian orbit. For Agha Mohammad Khan, the re-subjugation and reintegration of Georgia into the Iranian Empire was part of the same process that had brought Shiraz, Isfahan, and Tabriz under his rule. He viewed Georgia, like the Safavids and Nader Shah before him, no different from the provinces in mainland Iran, such as Khorasan. As the Cambridge History of Iran states, its permanent secession was inconceivable and had to be resisted in the same way as one would resist an attempt at the separation of Fars or Gilan. It was therefore natural for Agha Mohammad Khan to perform whatever necessary means in the Caucasus in order to subdue and reincorporate the recently lost regions following Nader Shah's death and the collapse of the Zands, including putting down what in Iranian eyes was seen as treason on the part of the vali of Georgia.

Finding an interval of peace amid their own quarrels and with northern, western, and central Persia secure, the Iranians demanded Heraclius II to renounce the treaty with Russia and to re-accept Persian suzerainty, in return for peace and the security of his kingdom. The Ottomans, Iran's neighboring rival, recognized the latter's rights over Kartli and Kakheti for the first time in four centuries. Heraclius appealed then to his theoretical protector, Empress Catherine II of Russia, asking for at least 3,000 Russian troops, but he was ignored, leaving Georgia to fend off the Iranian threat alone. Nevertheless, Heraclius II still rejected the shah's ultimatum.

Agha Mohammad Khan subsequently crossed the Aras River, and after a turn of events by which he gathered more support from his subordinate khans of Erivan and Ganja, he sent Heraclius a last ultimatum, which he also declined, but, sent couriers to St. Petersburg. Gudovich, who sat in Georgievsk at the time, instructed Heraclius to avoid "expense and fuss", while Heraclius, together with Solomon II and some Imeretians headed southwards of Tbilisi to fend off the Iranians.

With half the number of troops Agha Mohammad Khan had crossed the Aras river, he now marched directly upon Tbilisi, where it commenced into a huge battle between the Iranian and Georgian armies. Heraclius had managed to mobilize some 5,000 troops, including some 2,000 from neighboring Imereti under its King Solomon II. The Georgians, hopelessly outnumbered, were eventually defeated despite stiff resistance. In a few hours, the Iranian king Agha Mohammad Khan was in full control of the Georgian capital. The Persian army marched back laden with spoil and carrying off thousands of captives.

By this, after the conquest of Tbilisi and being in effective control of eastern Georgia, Agha Mohammad was formally crowned Shah in 1796 in the Mughan plain. As the Cambridge History of Iran notes; "Russia's client, Georgia, had been punished, and Russia's prestige, damaged." Heraclius II returned to Tbilisi to rebuild the city, but the destruction of his capital was a death blow to his hopes and projects. Upon learning of the fall of Tbilisi General Gudovich put the blame on the Georgians themselves. To restore Russian prestige, Catherine II declared war on Persia, upon the proposal of Gudovich, and sent an army under Valerian Zubov to the Qajar possessions on April of that year, but the new Tsar Paul I, who succeeded Catherine in November, shortly recalled it.

=== Aftermath and absorption into the Russian Empire ===
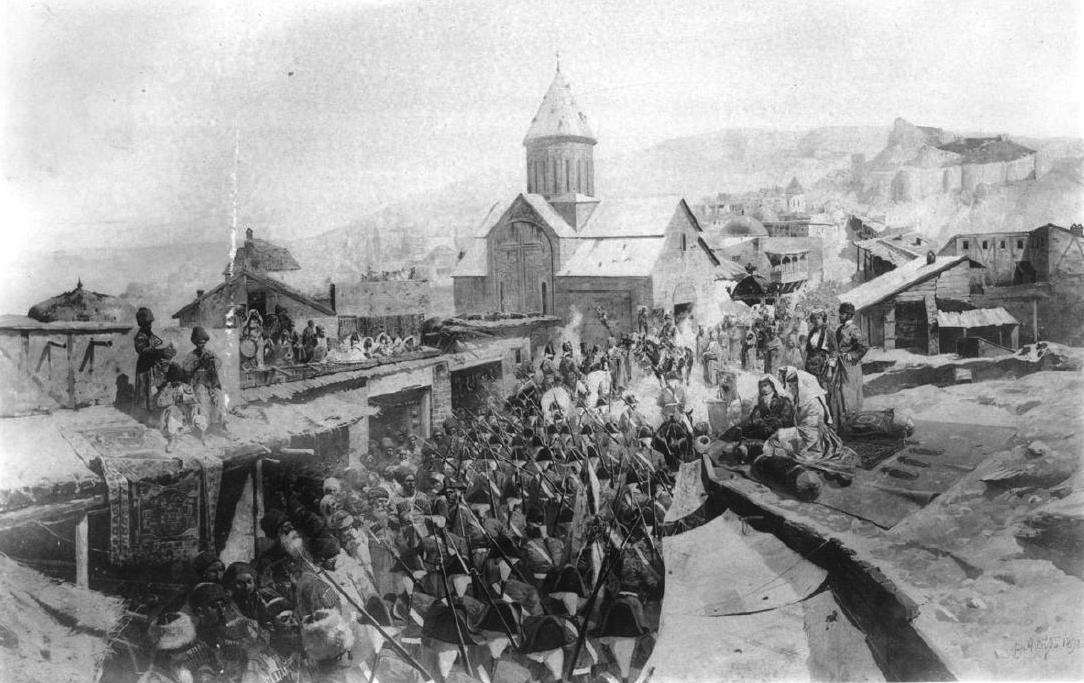
Entrance of the Russian troops in Tiflis, 26 November 1799, by Franz Roubaud, 1886

Reestablishment of Iranian rule over Georgia was short-lived this time, and the next few years were years of muddling and confusion. In 1797, Agha Mohammad Khan was assassinated in his tent in Shusha, the capital of the Karabakh khanate, which he had taken just some days earlier. On January 14, 1798, as King Heraclius II died, and he was succeeded on the throne by his eldest son, George XII (1746–1800) who, on February 22, 1799, recognized his own eldest son, the Tsarevich David (Davit Bagrationi-batonishvili), 1767–1819, as official heir apparent. In the same year, following the power vacuum in Georgia that got created mainly due to Agha Mohammad Khan's death, the Russian troops entered Tbilisi. Pursuant to article VI of the 1783 treaty, Emperor Paul confirmed David's claim to reign as the next king on April 18, 1799. But strife broke out among King George's many sons and those of his late father over the throne, Heraclius II having changed the succession order at the behest of his third wife, Queen Darejan (Darya), to favor the accession of younger brothers of deceased kings over their own sons.

The resulting dynastic upheaval prompted King George to secretly invite Paul I of Russia to invade Kartli-Kakheti, subdue the Bagrationi princes, and govern the kingdom from St. Petersburg, on the condition that George and his descendants be allowed to continue to reign nominally – in effect, offering to mediatise the Bagrationi dynasty under the Romanov emperors. Continued pressure from Persia, also prompted George XII's request for Russian intervention.

Paul tentatively accepted this offer, but before negotiations could be finalized, he changed his mind and issued a decree on December 18, 1800 annexing Kartli-Kakheti to Russia and deposing the Bagratids. Paul himself was assassinated shortly thereafter. It is said that his successor, Emperor Alexander I, considered retracting the annexation in favor of a Bagratid heir, but being unable to identify one likely to retain the crown, on September 12, 1801, Alexander proceeded to confirm annexation. Meanwhile, King George had died on December 28, 1800, before learning that he had lost his throne. By the following April, Russian troops took control of the country's administration and in February 1803 Tsarevich David Bagrationi was escorted by Russian troops from Tbilisi to St. Petersburg.

As it was impossible for Iran to give up Georgia, which had made part of the concept of Iran for centuries like the rest of its Caucasian territories, the annexation of Kartli-Kakheti led directly to the Russo-Persian Wars of the 19th century, namely that of 1804–1813 and 1826–1828. During the 1804–1813 war, the Russians scored a crucial victory over the Iranian army at the Zagam river saving Tbilisi from Iranian reconquest. The war eventually ended with the Treaty of Gulistan, which forced Iran to officially cede eastern Georgia, Dagestan, as well as most of the modern-day Azerbaijan Republic to Russia. By the 1826-28 war, Russia took modern-day Armenia, the Nakhichevan Khanate, the Lankaran Khanate and Iğdır from Iran. Thus, by 1828, the Russians had gained an immensely strong foothold in the Caucasus. Parts of western Georgia were added to the empire during the same period through wars with the Ottoman Empire.

== Population ==
By the year 1800, the Kingdom of Kartli-Kakheti was home to approximately 45,000 households, amounting to a total population of around 320,900 individuals, of whom approximately 220,000 were ethnically Georgian. In addition to Georgians, the kingdom was inhabited by various ethnic groups, including Turkoman tribes, Armenians, Ossetians, Jews, and Greeks. Notably, the demographic composition varied considerably across different regions of the kingdom. Areas such as Abotsi, Lore-Tashir, Bambak, and various parts of Lower Kartli (e.g., the Dmanisi Gorge, Trialeti, and Somkhiti) were almost entirely depopulated. Sabaratiano was likewise affected, though not entirely depopulated. Conversely, regions such as Inner Kartli, the Ksani Valley, the Aragvi area, as well as various parts of Kakheti (e.g., Ertso-Tianeti, Outer and Inner Kakheti, Kiziki, and Thither Region), were relatively more densely populated. Regarding the highland regions — Dvaleti, Khevi, Mtiuleti, Pshavi, Khevsureti, and Tusheti — each was home to several thousand inhabitants.

== Kings ==
Name	Lifespan	Reign start	Reign end	Notes	Family	Image
Heraclius II: ერეკლე II	November 7, 1720 – January 11, 1798 (aged 77)	January 8, 1762	January 11, 1798	Son of Teimuraz II	Bagrationi	Heraclius II of Georgia
George XII: გიორგი XII	November 10, 1746 – December 28, 1800 (aged 54)	January 11, 1798	December 28, 1800	Son of Heraclius II	Bagrationi	George XII of Georgia

== Sources ==
- Fisher, William Bayne; Avery, P.; Hambly, G. R. G; Melville, C. (1991). The Cambridge History of Iran. Vol. 7. Cambridge: Cambridge University Press. ISBN 0521200954.
- Hitchins, Keith (1998). "EREKLE II". Encyclopaedia Iranica, Vol. VIII, Fasc. 5. pp. 541–542.
- Jaoshvili, Vakhtang (1984). Population of Georgia in the XVIII–XX centuries. Metsniereba.
- Mikaberidze, Alexander (2011). Conflict and Conquest in the Islamic World: A Historical Encyclopedia. Vol. 1. ABC-CLIO. ISBN 978-1598843361.
- Perry, John (1991). "The Zand dynasty". The Cambridge History of Iran, Vol. 7: From Nadir Shah to the Islamic Republic. Cambridge: Cambridge University Press. pp. 63–104. ISBN 9780521200950.
- Perry, John R. (2006). Karim Khan Zand. Oneworld Publications. ISBN 978-1851684359.
- Suny, Ronald Grigor (1994). The Making of the Georgian Nation. Indiana University Press. ISBN 978-0253209153.
