= List of heads of the Georgian Orthodox Church =

The heads of the Georgian Orthodox Church and of its direct predecessors in the ancient Georgian Kingdom of Iberia (Kartli) have continuously borne the title Catholicos-Patriarch of All Georgia since 1010. This designation reflects both the primate’s role as the supreme spiritual leader of the entire Georgian Church and his patriarchal dignity.

The sole interruption in this nearly millennium-long tradition occurred between 1811 and 1917, when the Russian Empire, after annexing the Kingdom of Kartli-Kakheti and the western Georgian principalities, forcibly abolished the autocephaly of the Georgian Church and placed it under the jurisdiction of the Most Holy Synod of the Russian Orthodox Church as part of its broader imperial policies of administrative and ecclesiastical centralization. Autocephaly and the title of Catholicos-Patriarch were restored only after the fall of the Tsarist regime in 1917.

The current style of the head of the Church is as follows:

Georgian: უწმიდესი და უნეტარესი, სრულიად საქართველოს კათოლიკოს-პატრიარქი, მცხეთა-თბილისის მთავარეპისკოპოსი, ბიჭვინთისა და ცხუმ-აფხაზეთის მიტროპოლიტი, დიდი მეუფე., romanized: uts'midesi da unet'aresi, sruliad sakartvelos k'atolik'os-p'at'riarki, mtskheta-tbilisis mtavarep'isk'op'osi, bich'vintisa da tskhum-apkhazetis mit'rop'olit'i, didi meupe.

"His Holiness and Beatitude, Catholicos-Patriarch of All Georgia, the Archbishop of Mtskheta-Tbilisi, Metropolitan bishop of Bichvinta and Tskhum-Abkhazia, a great bishop."

== Archbishops of Mtskheta (326–467) ==
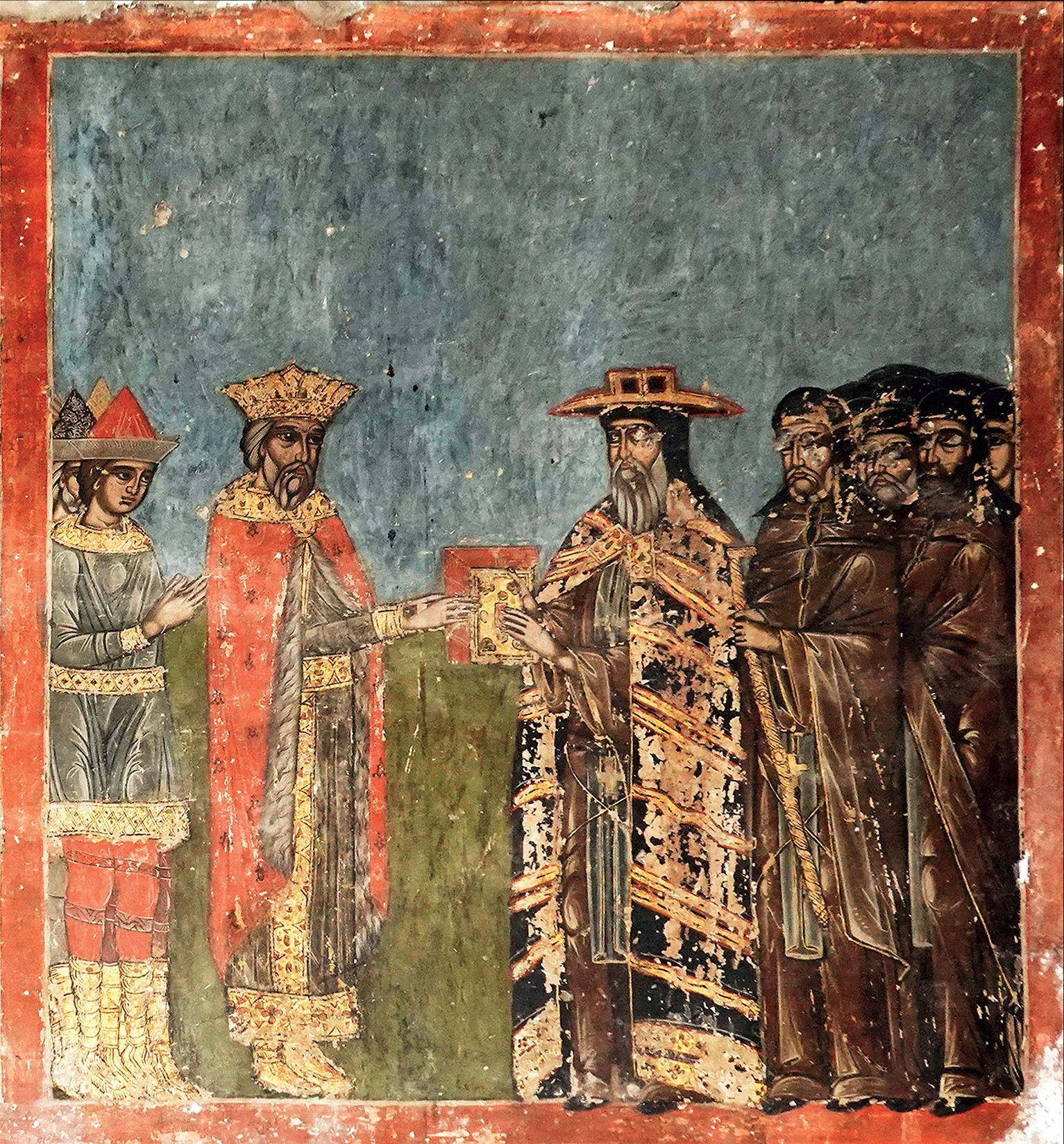
The first Christian king of Iberia, Mirian III (left) with his first archbishop, John I.

Order	Name	Period
1	John I	(326–363)
2	Jacob	(363–375)
3	Iobi	(375–390)
4	Elia I	(390–400)
5	Svimeon I	(400–410)
6	Mose	(410–425)
7	Iona	(425–429)
8	Ieremia	(429–433)
9	Grigol I	(433–434)
10	Vasili I	(434–436)
11	Glonakor	(436–448)
12	Iovel I	(448–452)
13	Mikael I	(452–467)

== Catholicos of Iberia (467–1010) ==
Order	Name	Period
14	Petre I	(467–474)
15	Samoel I	(474–502)
16	Gabriel I	(502–510)
17	Tavfechag I	(510–516)
18	Chirmagi–Chigirmane	(516–523)
19	Saba I	(523–532)
20	Evlavi	(532–544)
21	Samoel II	(544–553)
22	Makari	(553–569)
23	Svimeon II	(569–575)
24	Samoel III	(575–582)
25	Samoel IV	(582–591)
26	Bartlome	(591–595)
27	Kirion I	(595–610)
28	Ioane II	(610–619)
29	Babila	(619–629)
30	Tabor	(629–634)
31	Samoel V	(634–640)
32	Evnon	(640–649)
33	Tavfechag II	(649–664)
34	Evlale	(664–668)
35	Iovel II	(668–670)
36	Samoel VI	(670–677)
37	Giorgi I	(677–678)
38	Kirion II	(678–683)
39	Izid–Bozidi	(683–685)
40	Teodore I (Teodose)	(685–689)
41	Petre (Svimeoni) II	(689–720)
42	Talale	(720–731)
43	Mamai	(731–744)
44	Ioane III	(744–760)
45	Grigol II	(760–767)
46	Sarmeane	(767–774)
47	Mikael II	(774–780)
48	Samoel VII	(780–790)
49	Kirile	(791–802)
50	Grigol III	(802–814)
51	Samoel VIII	(814–826)
52	Giorgi II	(826–838)
53	Gabriel II	(838–850)
54	Ilarion I	(850–860)
55	Arsen I	(860–887)
56	Evsuki	(887–900)
57	Klementos	(900–914)
58	Basili II	(914–930)
59	Mikael III	(930–944)
60	Davit I	(944–955)
61	Arseni II	(955–980)
62	Okropir (Ioane I)	(980–1001)
63	Svimeon III	(1001)

== Catholicos-Patriarchs of Georgia (1010–1811) ==
Order	Name	Period	Notes
64	St. Melkisedek I	1001–1030	
65	Okropir (Ioane) II	1031–1039	
66	Melkisedek I	1039–1045	restored
67	Okropir (Ioane) II	1045–1049	restored
68	Ekvtime I	1049–1055	
69	Giorgi III (Taoeli)	1055–1065	
70	Gabriel III (Safareli)	1065–1080	
71	Dimitri	1080–1090	
72	Basili III (Karichisdze)	1090–1100	
73	Ioane IV (Sapareli)	1100–1142	
74	Svimeon IV (Gulaberisdze)	1142–1146	
75	Saba II	1146–1150	
76	Nikoloz I (Gulaberidze)	1150–1178	
77	Michael IV	1178–1186	
78	Theodore II	1186–1206	
79	Basil IV	1206–1208	
80	John VII	1208–1210	
81	Epiphane	1210–1220	
82	Ekvtime II	1220–1222	
83	Arseni III	1222–1225	
84	Giorgi IV	1225–1230	
85	Arseni IV (Bulmaisisdze)	1230–1240	
86	Nikoloz II	1240–1280	
87	Abraam I	1280–1310	
88	Ekvtime III	1310–1325	
89	Mikel V	1325–1330	
90	Basil V	1330–1350	
91	Doroteoz I	1350–1356	
92	Shio I	1356–1364	
93	Nikoloz III	1364–1380	
94	Giorgi V	1380–1399	
95	Elioz (Gobirakhisdze)	1399–1411	
96	Mikel VI	1411–1426	
97	David II	1426–1428	
98	Teodore III	1428–1435	
99	David III	1435–1439	
100	Shio II	1439–1443/47	
101	David IV	1443/47–1459	
102	Markoz	1460–1466	
103	Davit IV	1466–1479	
104	Evagre	1480–1492	
105	Abraam II (Abalaki)	1492–1497	
106	Efrem I	1497–1500	
107	Evagre	1500–1503	restored
108	Doroteoz II	1503–1510	
109	Dionise	1510–1511	
110	Doroteoz II	1511–1516	restored
111	Basil VI	1517–1528	
112	Malachia	1528–1538	
113	Melkisedek II (Bagrationi)	1538–1541	
114	Germene	1541–1547	
115	Svimeon V	1547–1550	
116	Zebede I	1550–1557	
117	Domenti I	1557–1562	
118	Nikoloz IV (Baratashvili)	1562–1584	
119	St. Nikoloz V	1584–1591	
120	Doriteoz III	1592–1599	
121	Domenti II	1599–1603	
122	Zebede II	1603–1610	
123	Ioane VI (Avalishvili)	1610–1613	
124	Kristefore I	1613–1622	
125	Zachary	1623–1630	
126	St. Evdemoz I (Diasamidze)	1630–1638	
127	Kristefore II (Amilakhvari)	1638–1660	
128	Domenti III	1660–1675	
129	Nikoloz VI (Magaladze)	1675–1676	
130	Nikoloz VII (Amilakhvari)	1676–1687	
131	Ioan VII (Diasamidze)	1687–1691	
132	Nikoloz VII (Amilakhvari)	1691–1695	restored
133	Ioan VII (Diasamidze)	1696–1700	restored
134	Evdemoz II (Diasamidze)	1700–1703	
135	Domenti IV	1704–1725	
136	Besarion (Orbeliani)	1725–1737	
137	Kirile	1737–1739	
138	Domenti IV	1739–1741	restored
139	Nikoloz VIII (Kherkheulidze)	1742–1744	
140	Anton I	1744–1755	
141	Ioseb (Jandieri)	1755–1764	
142	Anton I	1764–1788	restored
143	St. Anton II	1788–1811	

== Exarchs of Georgia (1811–1917) ==
Autocephalous status abolished and administration placed under the Russian Orthodox Church, 1811–1917

Order	Name	Period
1	Metropolitan Barlaam (Eristavi)	1811–1817
2	Metropolitan Theophilact (Rusanov)	1817–1821
3	Metropolitan Jonah (Vasilevsky)	1821–1832
4	Archbishop Moses (Bogdanov-Platonov)	1832–1834
5	Archbishop Eugene (Baganov)	1834–1844
6	Archbishop Isidore (Nikolsky)	1844–1858
7	Archbishop Ebsebius (Ilinsky)	1858–1877
8	Archbishop Joannicius (Rudnev)	1877–1882
9	Archbishop Paul (Lebedev)	1882–1887
10	Archbishop Palladius (Rayev)	1887–1892
11	Archbishop Vladimir (Bogoyavlensky)	1892–1898
12	Archbishop Flavian (Gorodetsky)	1898–1901
13	Archbishop Alexis I (Opotsky)	1901–1905
14	Archbishop Nicholas (Nalimov)	1905–1906
15	Archbishop Nikon (Sofiisky)	1906–1908
16	Archbishop Innocent (Beliaev)	1909–1913
17	Archbishop Alexis II (Molchanov)	1913–1914
18	Archbishop Piterim (Oknov)	1914–1915
19	Archbishop Platon (Rozhdestvensky)	1915–1917

== Catholicos-Patriarchs of All Georgia (1917–present) ==
Order	Portrait	Name	Period			Notes
144		St. Kyrion II კირიონ II	1 October 1917	26 June 1918	8 months and 25 days	Assassinated (found murdered in the patriarchal residence at Martkopi Monastery on 27 June 1918) under mysterious circumstances. Canonized as Hieromartyr by the Holy Synod of the Georgian Apostolic Orthodox Church on 17 October 2002.
145		Leonid ლეონიდე	28 November 1918	11 June 1921	2 years, 6 months and 14 days	Elected during the short-lived Georgian Democratic Republic; led the Church through the Bolshevik Red Army invasion of 1921 that ended Georgian independence; died amid the onset of Soviet occupation and a cholera epidemic.
146		St. Ambrosius ამბროსი	14 October 1921	29 March 1927	5 years, 5 months and 15 days	Strongly opposed Soviet rule. In 1922 he sent a formal memorandum to the Genoa Conference protesting the Bolshevik occupation of Georgia and calling for international intervention. Arrested by Soviet authorities, imprisoned, released in 1926. Canonized as a Georgian Orthodox saint in 1995.
147		Christophorus III ქრისტეფორე III	4 June 1927	10 January 1932	4 years, 7 months and 6 days	Led the Church under harsh Soviet anti-religious pressure and repression. Notable for his fierce resistance to Russification policies, specifically fighting to restore the Georgian language to liturgy and education.
148		St. Callistratus კალისტრატე	21 June 1932	3 February 1952	19 years, 7 months and 13 days	Led the Church through the most repressive Stalin-era anti-religious campaigns yet managed limited reopenings and cultural initiatives, including the Russian Orthodox Church’s formal recognition of Georgian autocephaly in 1943, despite facing three years of imprisonment. Canonized as a Georgian Orthodox saint in 2016.
149		Melchizedek III მელქისედეკ III	5 April 1952	10 January 1960	7 years, 9 months and 5 days	Despite constant Soviet anti-religious pressure, successfully reopened churches, consecrated new bishops and achieved limited expansion of church activities.
150		Ephraim II ეფრემ II	20 February 1960	7 April 1972	12 years, 1 month and 18 days	Avoided direct confrontation with Soviet authorities while delivering patriotic sermons that boosted his popularity; admitted the Georgian Church to the World Council of Churches in 1962.
151		David V დავით V	1 July 1972	9 November 1977	5 years, 4 months and 8 days	Ascension followed serious irregularities, including the alleged destruction of predecessor Ephraim II’s will (which reportedly favored another candidate) and a rigged Holy Synod vote; widely viewed by Georgian dissidents and samizdat writers as overly aligned with Soviet authorities.
152		Ilia II ილია II	23 December 1977	17 March 2026	48 years, 2 months and 22 days	Died at the age of 93, after 48 years of service (the longest tenure in the Church’s over-millennia-long history); widely regarded as a pivotal figure who guided the Georgian Church and nation through the late Soviet era, the transition to independence, and a period of spiritual and national revival.
153		Shio III შიო III	11 May 2026	Incumbent	28 days	The first patriarch elected since the 1991 restoration of independence. Widely regarded as a radical conservative; admired by conservative and pro-government circles for his emphasis on Christianity in national identity, yet viewed by others with suspicion over potential Russian ecclesiastical influence and a shift toward ultraconservatism.

=== Timeline ===
This is a graphical timeline of the catholicos-patriarchs of All Georgia. They are listed in order of first assuming office.

The following chart lists the catholicos-patriarchs by lifespan, with the years outside of their tenure in blue.
