= 1755 =

1755 in various calendars
- Gregorian calendar: 1755; MDCCLV
- Ab urbe condita: 2508
- Armenian calendar: 1204; ԹՎ ՌՄԴ
- Assyrian calendar: 6505
- Balinese saka calendar: 1676–1677
- Bengali calendar: 1161–1162
- Berber calendar: 2705
- British Regnal year: 28 Geo. 2 – 29 Geo. 2
- Buddhist calendar: 2299
- Burmese calendar: 1117
- Byzantine calendar: 7263–7264
- Chinese calendar: 甲戌年 (Wood Dog); 4452 or 4245 — to — 乙亥年 (Wood Pig); 4453 or 4246
- Coptic calendar: 1471–1472
- Discordian calendar: 2921
- Ethiopian calendar: 1747–1748
- Hebrew calendar: 5515–5516
- Hindu calendars
- Vikram Samvat: 1811–1812
- Shaka Samvat: 1676–1677
- Kali Yuga: 4855–4856
- Holocene calendar: 11755
- Igbo calendar: 755–756
- Iranian calendar: 1133–1134
- Islamic calendar: 1168–1169
- Japanese calendar: Hōreki 5 (宝暦５年)
- Javanese calendar: 1680–1681
- Julian calendar: Gregorian minus 11 days
- Korean calendar: 4088
- Minguo calendar: 157 before ROC 民前157年
- Nanakshahi calendar: 287
- Thai solar calendar: 2297–2298
- Tibetan calendar: ཤིང་ཕོ་ཁྱི་ལོ་ (male Wood-Dog); 1881 or 1500 or 728 — to — ཤིང་མོ་ཕག་ལོ་ (female Wood-Boar); 1882 or 1501 or 729

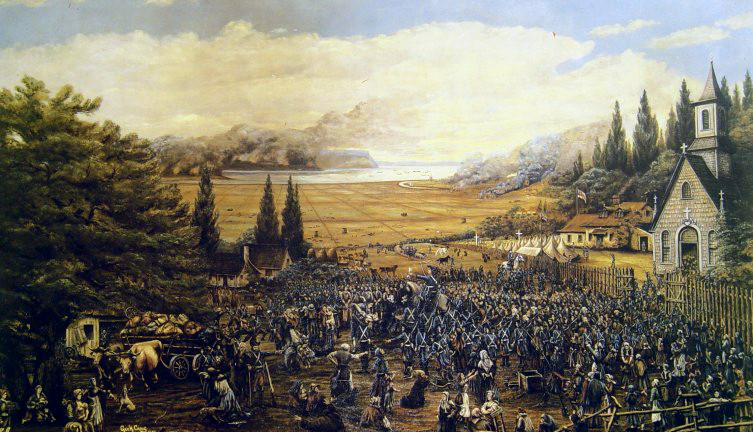
August 10: The Expulsion of the Acadians from Nova Scotia begins.(1893 painting)

1755 (MDCCLV) was a common year starting on Wednesday of the Gregorian calendar and a common year starting on Sunday of the Julian calendar, the 1755th year of the Common Era (CE) and Anno Domini (AD) designations, the 755th year of the 2nd millennium, the 55th year of the 18th century, and the 6th year of the 1750s decade. As of the start of 1755, the Gregorian calendar was 11 days ahead of the Julian calendar, which remained in localized use until 1923.

== Events ==
=== January–March ===
- January 23 (O. S. January 12, Tatiana Day, nowadays celebrated on January 25) – Moscow University is established.
- February 13 – Treaty of Giyanti: The kingdom of Mataram on Java is divided in two, creating the sultanate of Yogyakarta and the sunanate of Surakarta.
- March 12 – A steam engine is used in the American colonies for the first time as New Jersey copper mine owner Arent Schuyler installs a Newcomen atmospheric engine to pump water out of a mineshaft.
- March 22 – Britain's House of Commons votes in favor of £1,000,000 of appropriations to expand the British Army and Royal Navy operations in North America.
- March 26 – General Edward Braddock and 1,600 British sailors and soldiers arrive at Alexandria, Virginia on transport ships that have sailed up the Potomac River. Braddock, sent to take command of the British forces against the French in North America, commandeers taverns and private homes to feed and house the troops.

=== April–June ===
- April 2 – A naval fleet, led by Commodore William James of the East India Company, captures Tulaji Angre's fortress Suvarnadurg from the Marathas.
- April 15 – A Dictionary of the English Language is published by Samuel Johnson (he had begun the work nine years earlier, in 1746).
- May 3 – France dispatches 3,600 troops to protect its Canadian colonies in Quebec from a British invasion, dispatching 2,400 to Quebec city and 1,200 to Louisbourg in Nova Scotia, unaware that a squadron of 11 fully armed warships from Britain's Royal Navy had sailed toward Canada on April 27.
- May 17 – Spanish missionary Tomas Sanchez and three families establish a settlement on the north side of the Rio Grande in New Spain. Sanchez names it Villa de Laredo. The new settlement is the northernmost part of the colony of Nuevo Santander, founded by José de Escandón, 1st Count of Sierra Gorda, which now comprises parts of the Mexican state of Tamaulipas and the U.S. state of Texas. The portion of Villa de Laredo north of the river later becomes Laredo, Texas; the remaining portion south of the river is later renamed Nuevo Laredo, Tamaulipas.
- May 19 – General Braddock hosts Iroquois leaders Scaroyady, Kaghswaghtaniunt and Silver Heels at Fort Cumberland, the British Army base in the colony of Maryland. The three chiefs pledge their alliance with the British in advance of Braddock's expedition into the Ohio Country.
- May 22 – The Province of Massachusetts Bay sends 2,000 troops to supplement other British Army and colonial forces in Acadia; the troops anchor at Chignecto Bay on June 1.
- May 24 – France completes the construction of Fort Duquesne, its new base to the west of the British colony of Pennsylvania. The British capture the fort during the French and Indian War and rename it Fort Pitt. The site, at the junction of the Allegheny River and the Monongahela River, is now Pittsburgh.
- May 30 – General Braddock's troops begin a difficult trek across the heavily wooded Allegheny Mountains from western Maryland into the Ohio country.
- June 5
  - Scottish chemist Joseph Black describes his discovery of carbon dioxide (fixed air) and magnesium, in a paper to the Medical Society of Edinburgh. The paper is published in 1756 with the title Experiments upon Magnesia alba, Quicklime, and some other alkaline Substances.
  - At the entrance of the Saint Lawrence River, a squadron of Royal Navy ships, under the command of British Admiral Edward Boscawen, intercepts the nine French ships dispatched to save Canada; seven of the nine ships are concealed by fog and are able to reach their destination; another of the transports escapes.
- June 16 – After a two-week siege, the French commander of Fort Beauséjour in North America surrenders to the British, marking the end of "Father Le Loutre's War".
- June 23 – Most of the French troops dispatched to Canada arrive at Quebec, along with the new Governor General of New France, Pierre de Rigaud, Marquis de Vaudreuil-Cavagnial.
- June 27 – Iyoas I becomes the new Emperor of Ethiopia upon the death of his father, Iyasu II

=== July–September ===
- July 9 – French and Indian War – Braddock Expedition: British troops and colonial militiamen are ambushed and suffer a devastating defeat inflicted by French and Indian forces. During the battle, British General Edward Braddock is mortally wounded. Colonel George Washington survives.
- July 17 – In a convoy of ships from Great Britain, returning to India for the East India Company, the lead ship Doddington (on her third voyage) wrecks in Algoa Bay near modern-day Port Elizabeth in South Africa, losing 247 of its 270 passengers and crew, together with a chest of gold coins from Robert Clive worth £33,000. In 1998, 1,400 coins from the wreck site are offered for sale, and in 2002 a portion is given to the South African government. Around twenty survivors of the wreck are eventually able to make safety after an open boat voyage.
- July 25 – The decision to deport the Acadians is made, during meetings of the Nova Scotia Council meeting in Halifax. From September 1755-June 1763, the vast majority of Acadians are deported to one of the following British Colonies in America: Massachusetts, Connecticut, New York, Pennsylvania, Maryland, Virginia, North Carolina, South Carolina and Georgia. Contrary to popular belief, no Acadians are sent to Louisiana. Those sent to Virginia are refused and then sent on to Liverpool, Bristol, Southampton and Penryn in England. In 1758 the Fortress of Louisbourg falls and all of the civilian population of Isle Royal (Cape Breton Island) and Isle St. Jean (Prince Edward Island) are repatriated to France. Among them were several thousand Acadians, who had escaped the deportation by fleeing into those areas. Very few Acadians successfully escape the deportation and do so only by fleeing into some of the northern sections of present day New Brunswick. The event inspires Longfellow to write the epic poem Evangeline.
- August 10 – The Expulsion of the Acadians begins, with the Bay of Fundy Campaign.
- September 2 – A powerful hurricane strikes the east coast of the British colony of North Carolina, killing 150 people and sinking five British and colonial merchant ships at Portsmouth Island.
- September 6 – The Russian Academy of Sciences awards its prize for "the best explanation of the true causes of electricity including their theory" to Switzerland's Johann Euler for his paper Disquisitio de causa physica electricitatis.
- September 8 – French and Indian War – Battle of Lake George: French Army troops, led by Jean Erdman, Baron Dieskau, and Canadian colonists, led by Jacques Legardeur de Saint-Pierre, drive south into Britain's New York province. They are met by British Army troops under General William Johnson being supplemented by 200 Mohawk troops led by the Mohawk war chief, Theyanoguin. After Theyanouguin and other Mohawks are killed in the battle, the clan matrons of the Mohawk nation forbid the men from participating in the war against the French until a French defeat seems certain.
- September 16 – Sir Charles Hanbury-Williams, the new British Minister to Russia, secures an alliance signed by Empress Catherine the Great. The Russian Empire agrees to provide up to 55,000 troops to defend the Electorate of Hanover against invasion by Prussia. At the time, King George II of Great Britain is also the ruler of the German duchy; the Russian troops are provided in return for an annual payment of £600,000.
- September 17 – Jean-Marc Vacheron founds his watch-making company Vacheron Constantin. To this day, Vacheron Constantin is the oldest watchmaker in the world with an uninterrupted watchmaking history since its foundation.
- September 18 – Two slaves, Mark and Phyllis, are publicly executed for the poisoning murder of their master, John Codman in front of a large crowd outside the Middlesex County Courthouse in Cambridge, Massachusetts. Phyllis is burned to death. Mark's execution by hanging is made as an example to other African slaves in the Province of Massachusetts Bay. His body is transported to Charlestown Common in what is now Somerville and displayed on a gibbet for more than 20 years. In 1798, Paul Revere mentions in his memoir that his famous ride of April 18, 1775, started when he first spotted British Army officers at a site "nearly opposite where Mark was hung in chains", I saw two men on Horse back, under a Tree".

=== October–December ===
- October 11 – In west Africa, officials of the Dutch West India Company sign a peace agreement with officials of the Ashanti Empire at Elmina. In return for an annual tribute in gold, the Ashanti maintain peaceful relations with the Europeans in the Dutch Gold Coast colony and the Dutch maintain their settlement at Fort Coenraadsburg. The area is now part of the Central Region of Ghana.
- October 12 – Having completed the Expulsion of the Acadians from St. John's Island (now Prince Edward Island), the British colonial Governor of Nova Scotia, Charles Lawrence, issues a proclamation that his office will receive proposals from English settlers "for the peopling and cultivating as well of the lands vacated by the French, as every other part of this valuable province."
- October 16 – The Penn's Creek massacre is carried out against white settlers who have moved into the Susquehanna Valley in the Pennsylvania colony, in territory also claimed by the Delaware Indians. The Delawares attack the Penn's Creek village, located near what is now Selinsgrove, Pennsylvania, and kill 25 of the 26 men, women and children living there.
- October 17 – The Mount Katla volcano erupts in Iceland and continues ejecting ash for the next 120 days, finally ceasing on February 13. An estimated 1.5 cubic kilometers (1.5 billion cubic meters or 53 billion cubic feet) of tephra is discharged by the volcano.
- October 25 – Yirmisekizzade Mehmed Said Pasha becomes the new Grand Vizier of the Ottoman Empire, the fifth person to serve as the Empire's Vizier in 1755.
- November 1 – More than 40,000 people are killed by the 8.5 magnitude earthquake in Lisbon, Portuguese Empire. The tremor begins at 9:40 in the morning local time off of the Atlantic coast of Portugal and sends a tsunami that strikes the coasts of Portugal, Spain and Morocco.
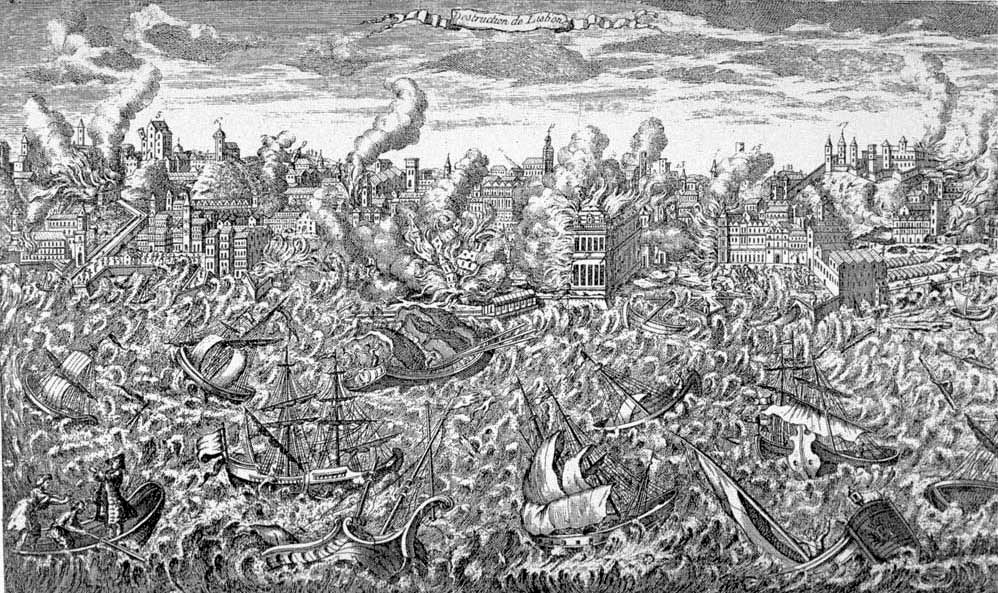
  November 1: Lisbon earthquake kills more than 40,000
- November 18
  - The Corsican Constitution is adopted by Corsican representatives, at the Consulta generale di Corte.
  - The 1755 Cape Ann earthquake occurs in the vicinity of Cape Ann, Massachusetts, causing extensive damage.
- November 25 – King Ferdinand VI of Spain grants the Religious of the Virgin Mary in the Philippines royal protection.
- December 2 – The second Eddystone Lighthouse off the coast of England is destroyed by fire.
- December 17 – Anton, Patriarch of the Georgian Orthodox Church, is dismissed by his opponents on the Ecclesiastical Council and briefly imprisoned for 18 months before being allowed to move to Russia; in 1764, Anton is again made the Georgian Orthodox Church's leader.

=== Date unknown ===
- Wolsey, the clothes manufacturer, is established in Leicester, England; the business celebrates its 250th anniversary in 2005.
- Construction of the Puning Temple complex in Chengde, China is completed, during the reign of the Qianlong Emperor.
- Construction of St Ninian's Church, Tynet, Scotland, the country's oldest surviving post-Reformation Roman Catholic clandestine church, is completed.
- The brine shrimp Artemia salina is first described, in Linnaeus' Systema Naturæ.

== Births ==
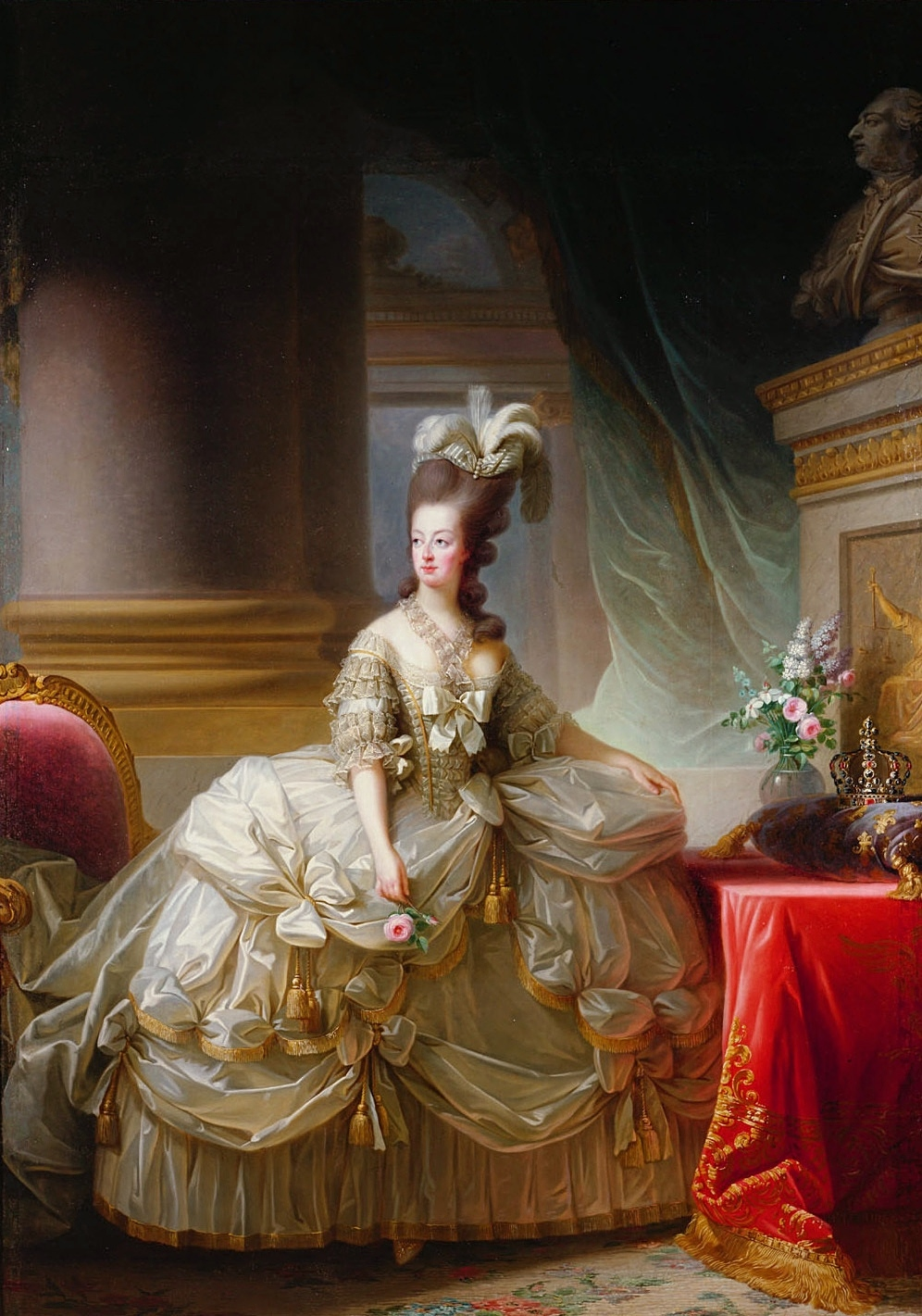
Marie Antoinette

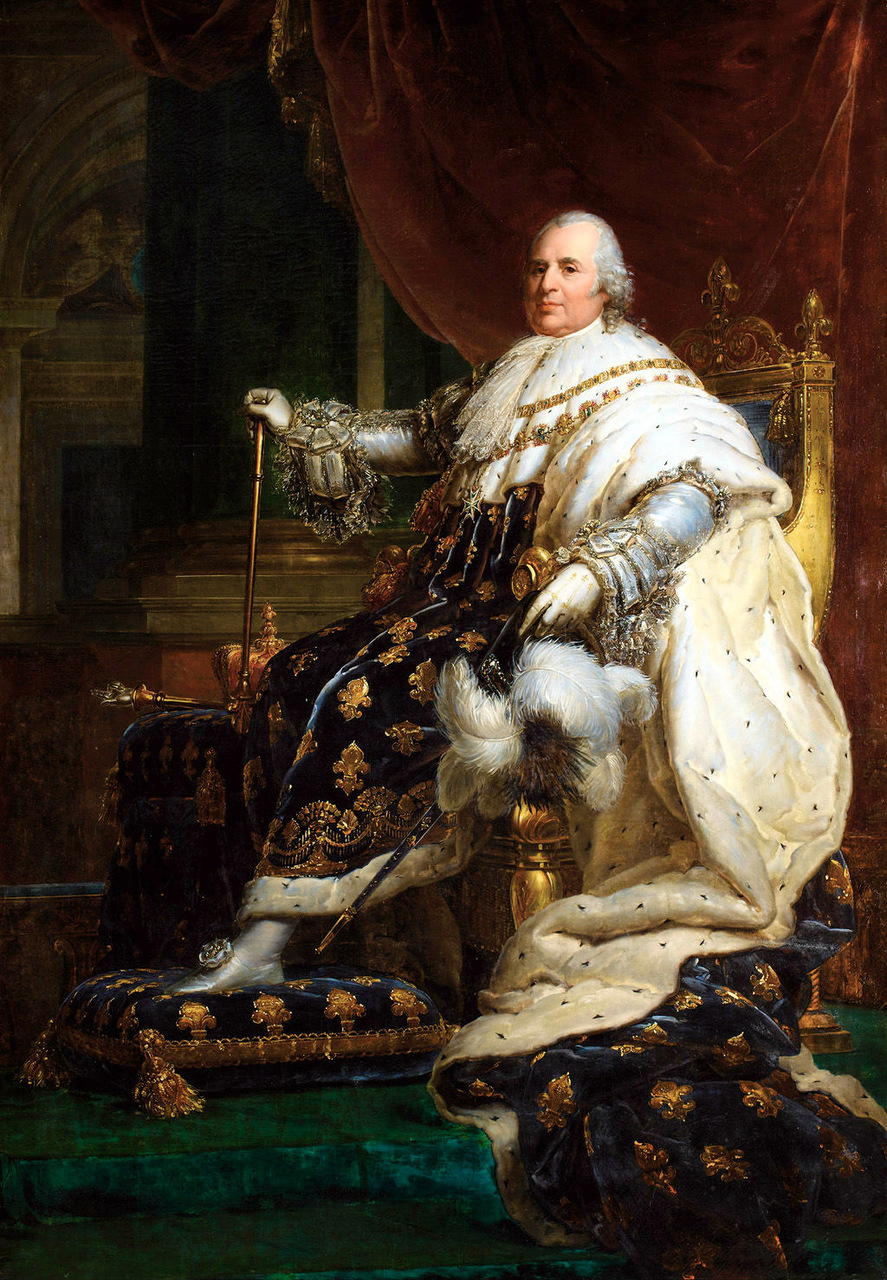
Louis XVIII

- January 25 – Paolo Mascagni, Italian anatomist (d. 1815)
- January 28 – Samuel Thomas von Sömmerring, German physician, anatomist (d. 1830)
- February 2 – Uriah Tracy, American politician and congressman from Connecticut, 1793 until 1807 (d. 1807)
- February 5 – Caroline Müller, Danish operatic mezzo-soprano, actress and dancer (d. 1826)
- February 11 – Albert Christoph Dies, German composer (d. 1822)
- February 21 – Anne Grant, Scottish poet (d. 1838)
- March 24 – Rufus King, American lawyer, politician and diplomat (d. 1827)
- April 3 – Simon Kenton, American frontiersman, Revolutionary Militia General (d. 1836)
- April 10 – Samuel Hahnemann, German founder of homeopathy (d. 1843)
- April 11 – James Parkinson, English surgeon, apothecary, geologist, palaeontologist and political activist (d. 1824)
- April 16 – Louise Élisabeth Vigée Le Brun, French painter (d. 1842)
- June 6 – Nathan Hale, American Revolutionary War captain, writer and patriot (d. 1776)
- June 15 – Antoine François, comte de Fourcroy, French chemist (d. 1809)
- June 30 – Paul Barras, French politician (d. 1829)
- September 9 – Benjamin Bourne, American politician (d. 1808)
- September 13 – Oliver Evans, American inventor, engineer and businessman (d. 1819)
- October 2 – Hannah Adams, American author (d. 1831)
- November 1 – Henriette von Crayen, German salonnière (d. 1832)
- November 2 – Marie Antoinette, Queen Consort of France (d. 1793)
- November 12 – Gerhard von Scharnhorst, Prussian general (d. 1813)
- November 17
  - Louis XVIII of France, brother of King Louis XVI (d. 1824)
  - Charles Manners-Sutton, Archbishop of Canterbury (d. 1828)
- December 3 – Gilbert Stuart, American painter from Rhode Island (d. 1828)
- date unknown
  - Maria Elizabetha Jacson, British botanist (d. 1829)
  - Yelena Shidyanskaya, Russian commander (d. 1849)

== Deaths ==
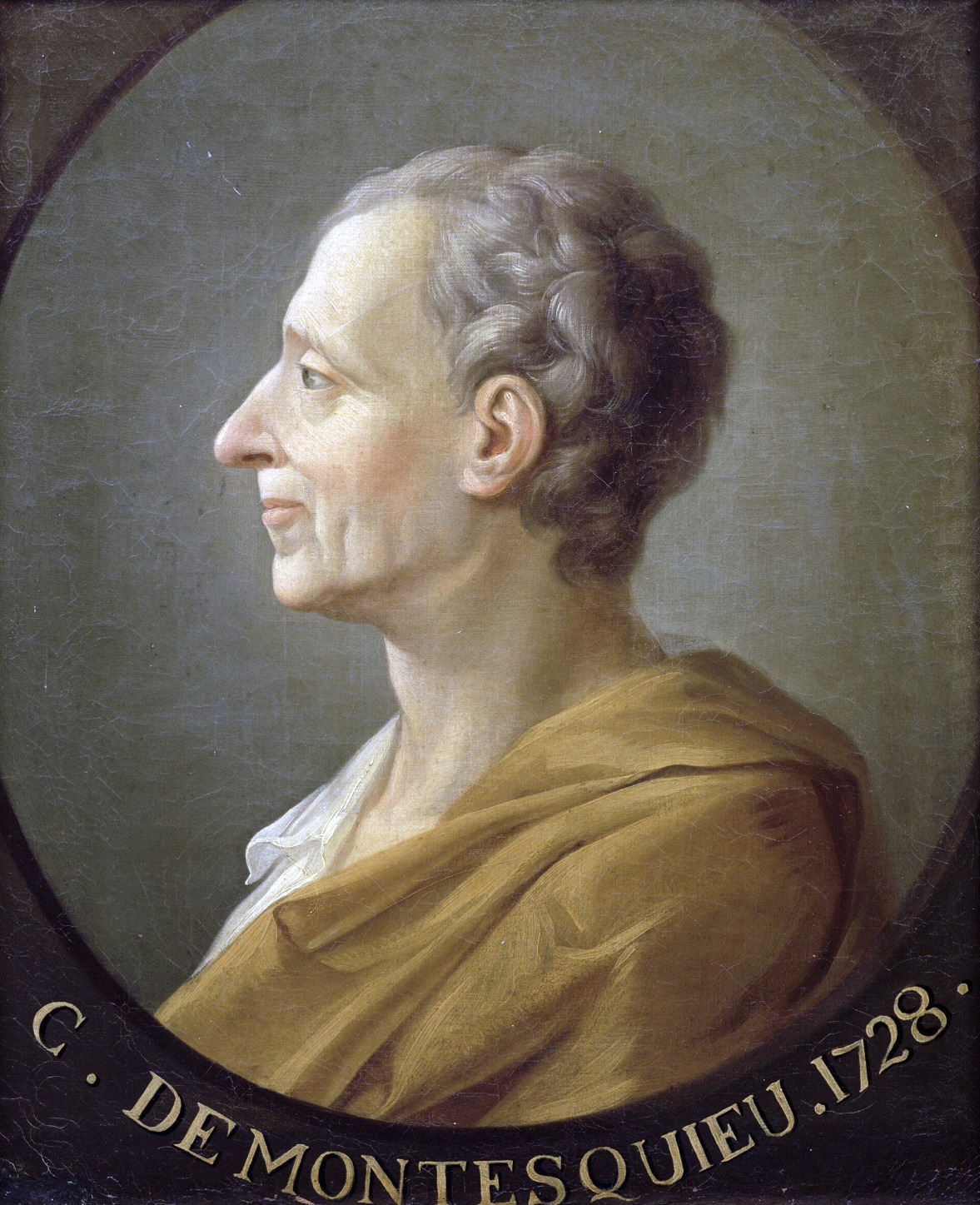
Montesquieu

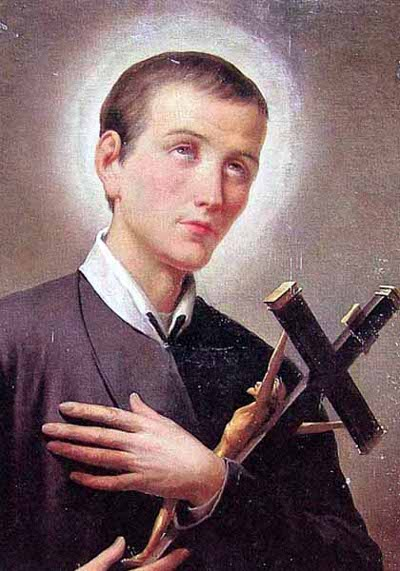
Saint Gerard Majella

- February 10 – Montesquieu, French writer (b. 1689)
- February 11 – Francesco Scipione, marchese di Maffei, Italian archaeologist (b. 1675)
- March 2 – Louis de Rouvroy, duc de Saint-Simon, French writer (b. 1675)
- March 7 – Thomas Wilson, Bishop of Sodor and Man (b. 1663)
- March 10 – Johann David Köhler, German historian (b. 1684)
- April 6 – Richard Rawlinson, English minister, antiquarian (b. 1690)
- April 30 – Jean-Baptiste Oudry, French painter (b. 1686)
- June 26 – Iyasu II, Emperor of Ethiopia (b. c. 1723)
- July 9 – Daniel Liénard de Beaujeu, Canadian officer during the Seven Years' War (b. 1711)
- July 13 – Edward Braddock, British general (b. c. 1695)
- July 14 – Jacques-Nompar III de Caumont, duc de La Force, French nobleman (b. 1714)
- August 13 – Francesco Durante, Italian composer (b. 1684)
- September 2 – Princess Marie Zéphyrine of France, sister of Louis XVI (b. 1750)
- September 8
  - Jacques Legardeur de Saint-Pierre, Canadian military commander (b. 1701)
  - Hendrick Theyanoguin, Mohawk Council leader killed in the Battle of Lake George (b. c. 1691)
  - Ephraim Williams, American philanthropist (b. 1715)
- September 9 – Johann Lorenz von Mosheim, German historian (b. 1694)
- September 13 – Pierre Gaultier de La Vérendrye, French-Canadian explorer (b. 1714)
- October 4 – Johann Georg Christian, Prince of Lobkowicz, Austrian field marshal (b. 1686)
- October 16 – Gerard Majella, Italian Roman Catholic lay brother and saint (b. 1725)
- October 22 – Elisha Williams, American rector of Yale College (b. 1694)
- October 28 – Joseph Bodin de Boismortier, French composer (b. 1689)
- November 25 – Johann Georg Pisendel, German musician (b. 1687)
- December 1 – Maurice Greene, English composer (b. 1696)
- December 5 – William Cavendish, 3rd Duke of Devonshire (b. 1698)
- approximate date
  - Queen Nanny of the Maroons, Jamaican national heroine (b. 1686)
  - Cai Wan, politically influential Chinese poet (b. 1695)
