= David IV (disambiguation) =

David IV was King of Georgia in the 11th and 12th centuries.

David IV also refers to:

- David IV, numbering sometimes used for David III Strathbogie (died 1335)
- David IV Strathbogie, titular Earl of Atholl (died 1369)
- David IV, Catholicos-Patriarch of Georgia
- David IV of Armenia (r. 1587–1629)
- the Caucasian Albanian Catholicos, see List of Caucasian Albanian catholicoi
