= Basil IV =

Basil IV may refer to:

- Basil IV of Georgia, catholicos-patriarch from 1206 to 1208
- Basil IV Simon, Syriac Orthodox patriarch of Antioch from 1421/2 to 1444/5
- Vasili IV of Russia, tsar from 1606 to 1610
- Basil IV (Coptic archbishop of Jerusalem) (r. 1959–1991)
