= Theodore III =

Theodore III may refer to:

- Theodore III of Georgia, catholics in 1427–1434
- Feodor III of Russia, tsar in 1676–1682
