= Theodore III of Georgia =

Theodore III (Georgian: თეოდორე) was a 15th-century Georgian prelate mentioned as the Catholicos Patriarch of Georgia in the documents dating from 1427 to 1434. Theodore was a close associate of King Alexander I of Georgia, with whom cooperated to restore the kingdom from the effects of the disastrous invasions by Timur earlier that century.

In surviving documents, Theodore's tenure was preceded and succeeded by those of the catholicos named David, whom traditional lists of the Georgian prelates, such as those compiled by Michel Tamarati and Roin Metreveli, and that accepted by the Georgian Orthodox Church, identify as David II (1435–1439) and David III (1435–1439), respectively. Some historians, especially Cyril Toumanoff, see in these names one and the same person, a son of King Alexander I. Toumanoff, further, conjectures that Theodore, like the latter-day catholicos Shio, was a locum tenens for David, who was designated by his father to become the prelate of the Georgian church at a very young age.

== Notes ==
Eastern Orthodox Church titles
Preceded by David II	Catholicos-Patriarch of All Georgia; 1427–1434	Succeeded by David III
