= David III =

David III may refer to:

- David III of Tao
- Dawit III, Emperor of Ethiopia
- Dafydd ap Gruffudd (David III), Prince of Wales
- David III Strathbogie
- David III, Catholicos-Patriarch of Georgia
- David III Ryckaert
- David III, see List of Caucasian Albanian catholicoi
