= David III, Catholicos-Patriarch of Georgia =

David III or IV (Georgian: დავით III/IV, davit' III/IV) was a 15th-century Catholicos-Patriarch of Georgia known from the group of documents dated from 1435 to 1439. They testify to David's efforts to restore the patriarchal see of Mtskheta from the devastation of Timur's invasions earlier that century. David's tenure coincided with the Council of Ferrara held from 1438 to 1439, at which the Georgian delegates rejected the union with the Roman Catholic Church.

The scholarly opinion is divided as to whether David III is the same catholicos as David II (III) and David IV (V), mentioned in the years 1426–1428 and 1447–1457, respectively, or not. Traditional lists of the Georgian prelates, such as those compiled by Michel Tamarati and Roin Metreveli, and accepted by the Georgian Orthodox Church, place three different catholicoi named David in the 15th century, while some historians, especially Cyril Toumanoff, see in these names one and the same person, a son of King Alexander I of Georgia. The confusion arises from the three chronological groups of documents, while the inconsistency in the numerals after the catholical names is because some historians, like Tamarati, omit the catholicos David of 859–861.

== Notes ==
Eastern Orthodox Church titles
Preceded by Theodore III	Catholicos-Patriarch of All Georgia; 1435–1439	Succeeded by Shio II
