= Georgian calligraphy =

Form of calligraphy

Georgian calligraphy (Georgian: ქართული კალიგრაფია, romanized: kartuli k'aligrapia) is a form of calligraphy, or artistic writing of the Georgian language using its three Georgian scripts.

== History ==
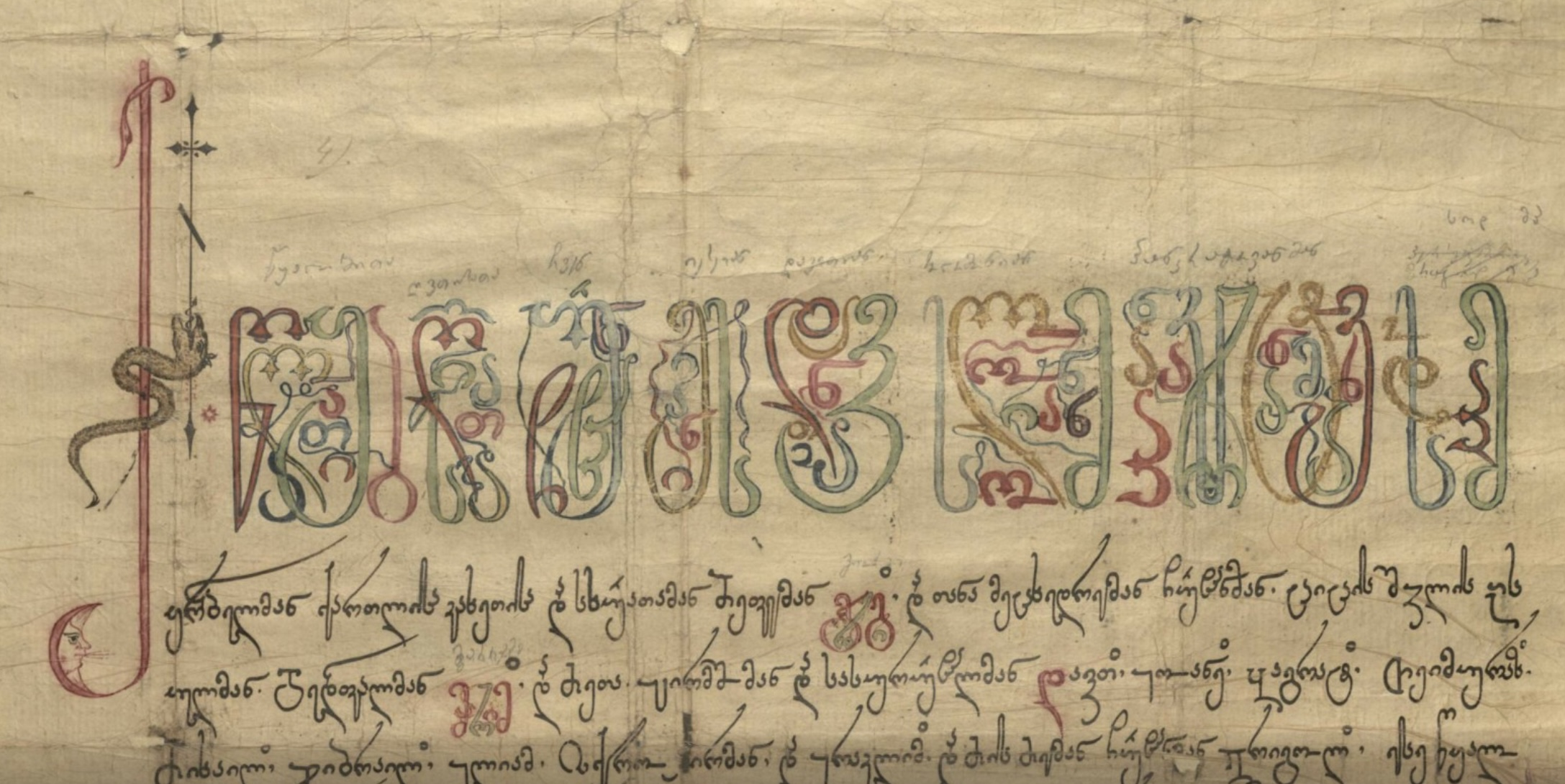
The royal charters of Queen Tamar (1187) and King George XII (1798) written in Mkhedruli calligraphy.

Georgia has a centuries-old tradition of a calligraphic school. Hand-written books from the early centuries became a cultural and a national phenomenon in Georgia. Christianity had played an enormous role in Georgian literary life since the Georgian Orthodox Church and its monks contributed their life to the Georgian writing by creating manuscripts and all the historical records for the Georgian nation.

Every year on April 14, Georgia celebrates the "Day of Georgian language". On this day the calligraphy contests are held, the winners are named and awards are given to the best calligraphers at the Georgian National Center of Manuscripts.

Georgian calligraphy was actively created outside Georgia as well. Georgians created calligraphical, religious and scholar works in the following places: Georgian-built Petritsoni monastery of Bulgaria, Iviron monastery of Mount Athos and Monastery of the Cross of Jerusalem. They were also active at Mar Saba of Jerusalem, Saint Catherine's Monastery of Mount Sinai, Antioch and Constantinople. Within Georgia, the Kingdom of the Iberians being the cultural center of the country had produced the most excellent masters of the Georgian calligraphy, art, literature and architecture. In 2022, the official "School of Georgian calligraphy" opened in Georgia, that will run courses for future calligraphers and font designers.

== Gallery ==
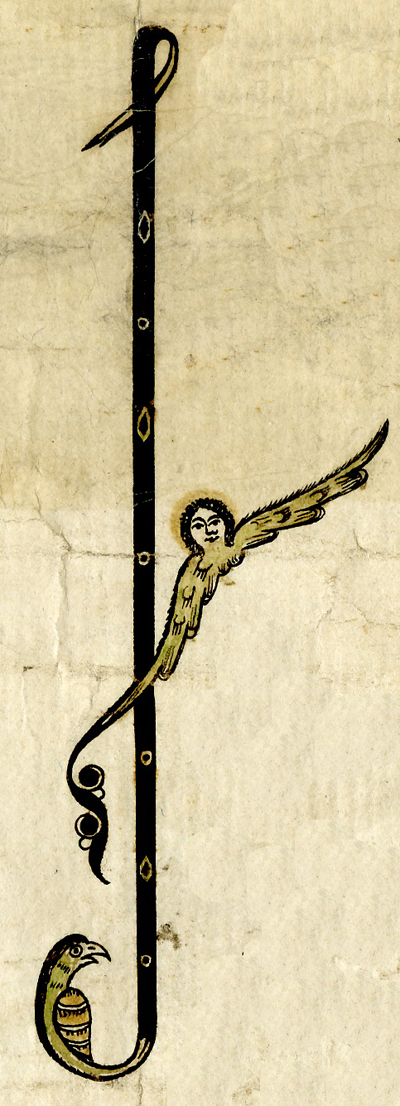

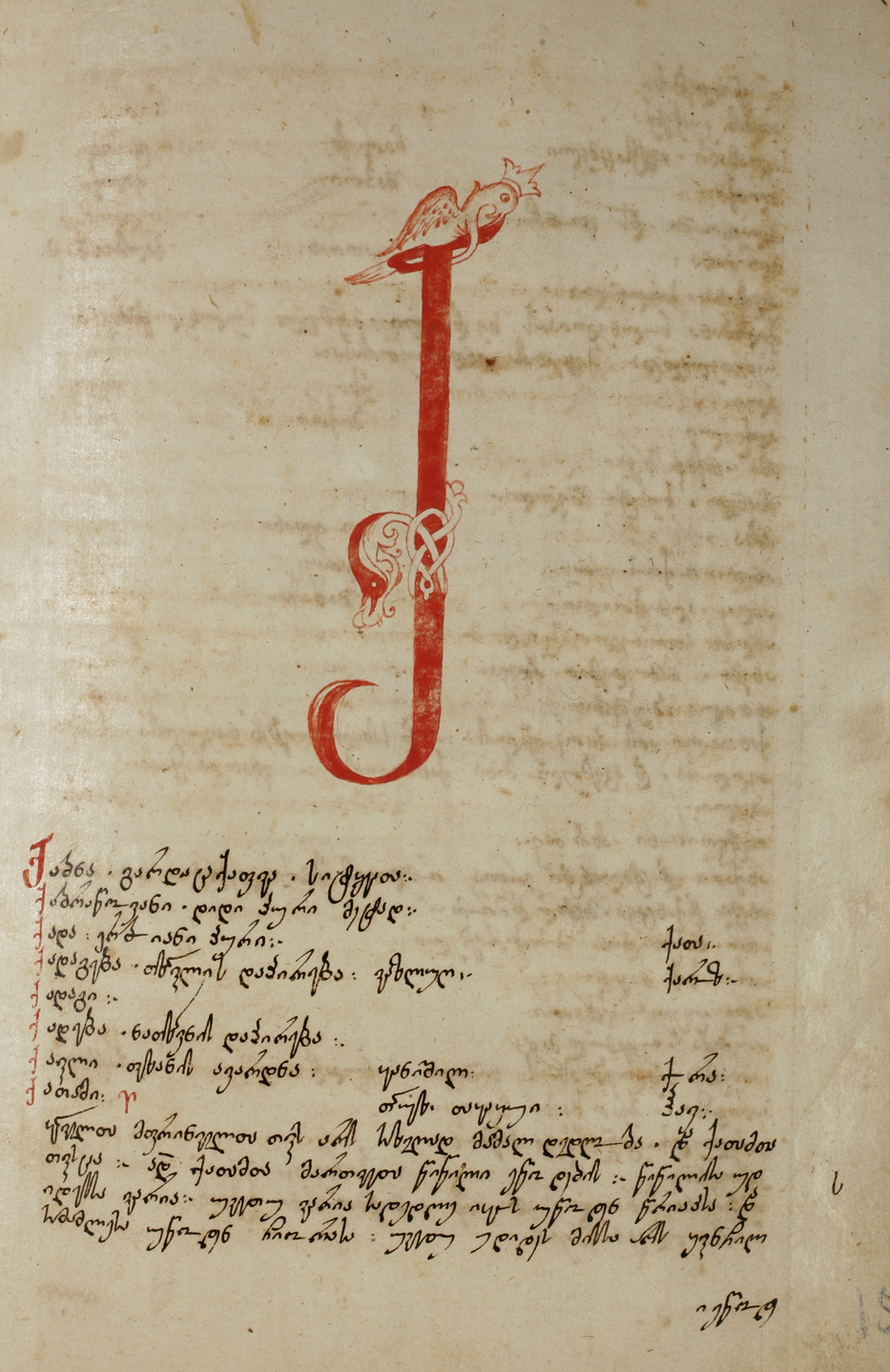

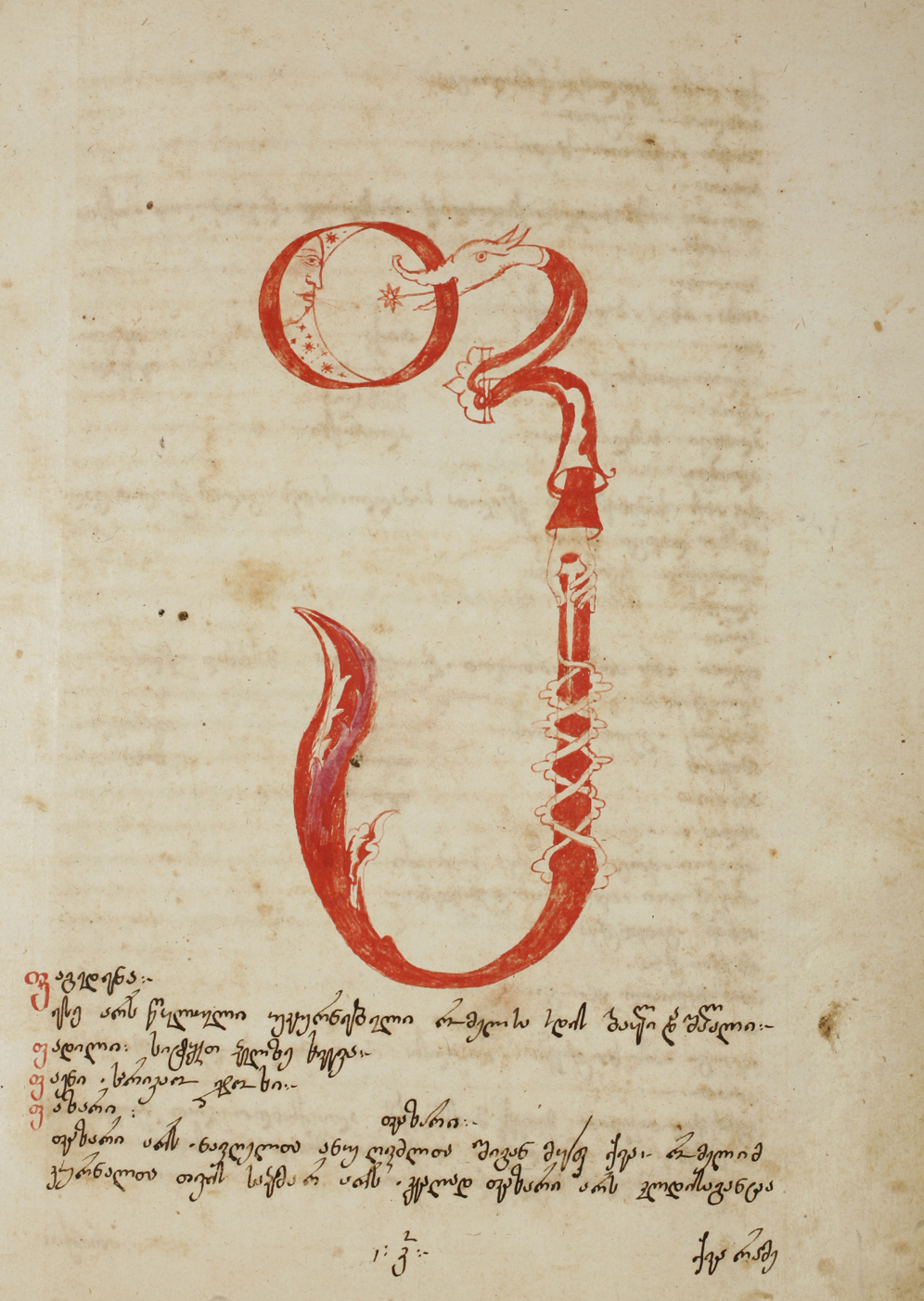

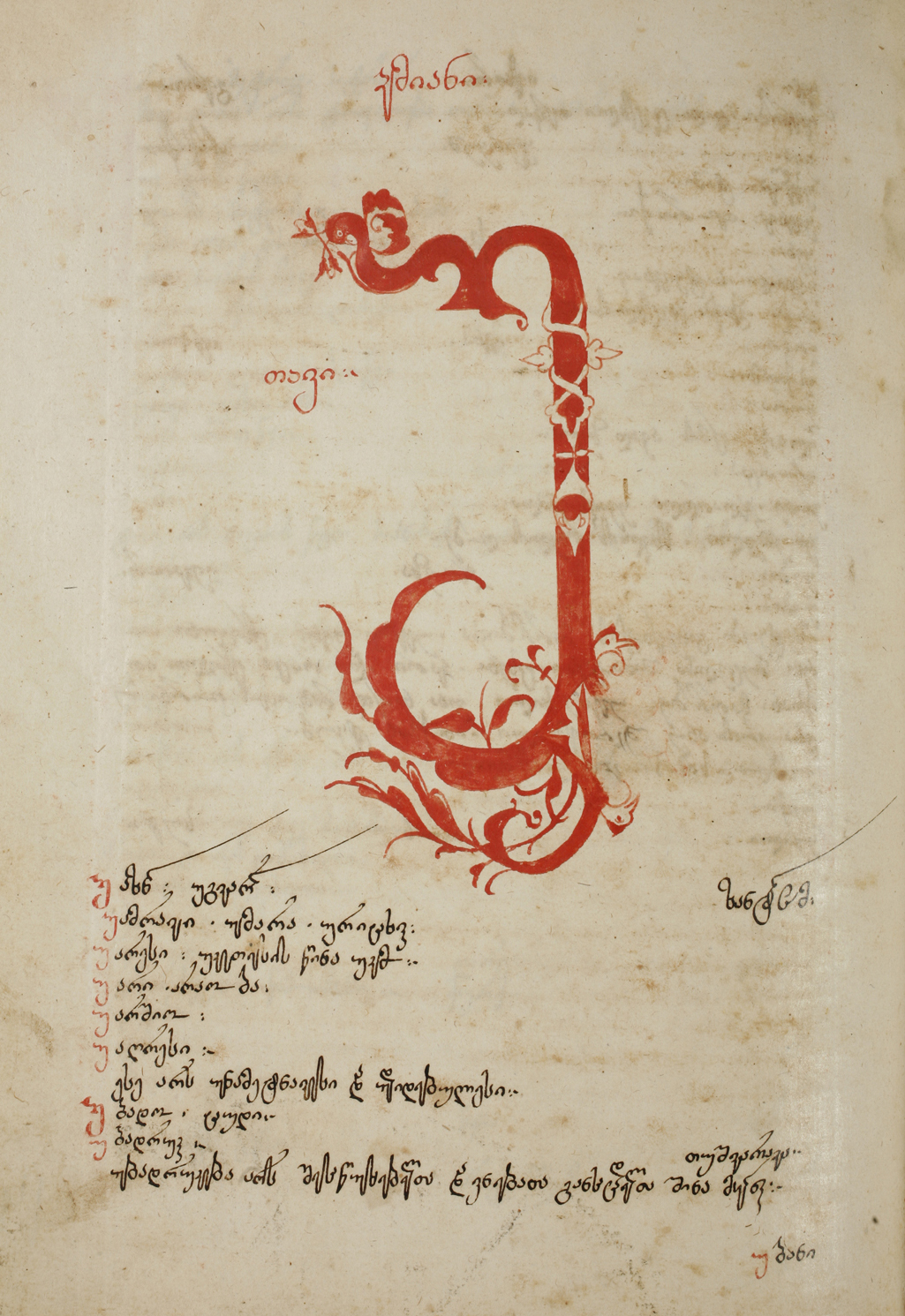

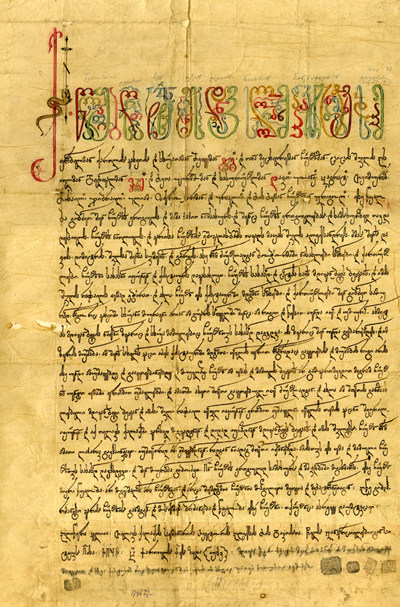

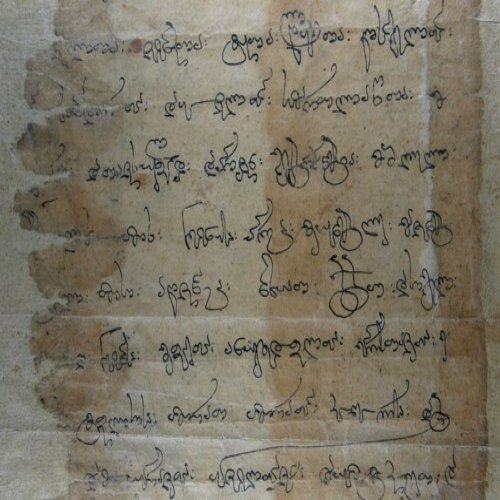

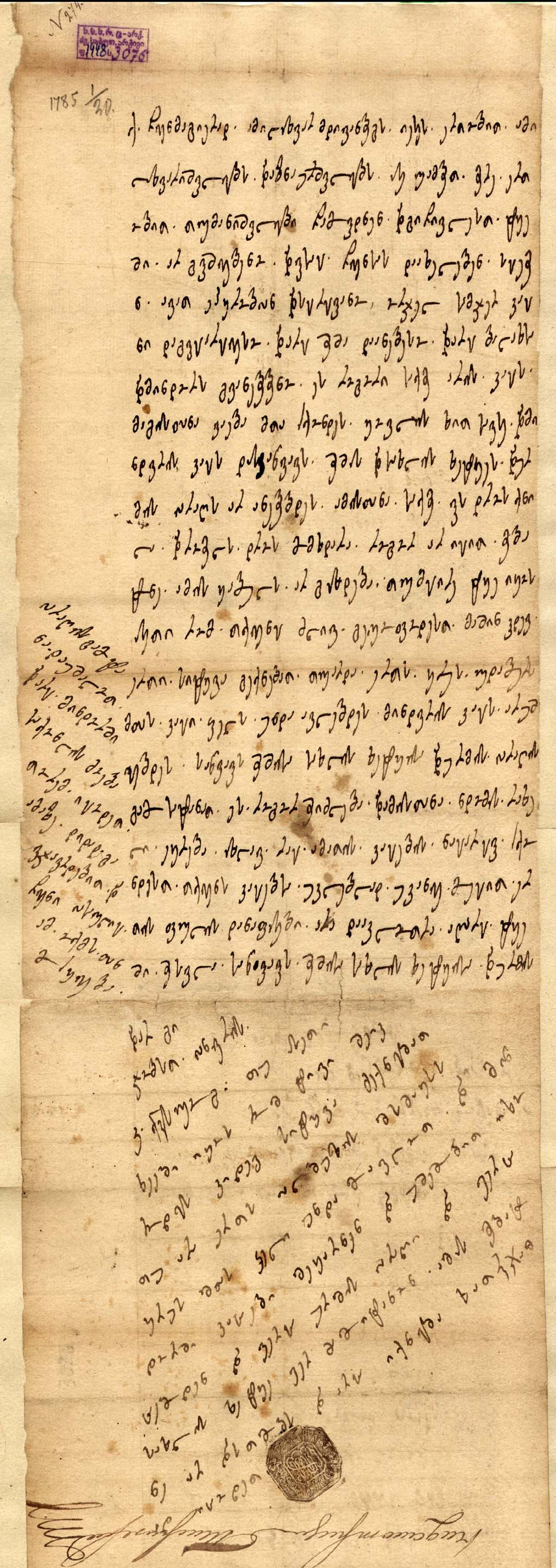

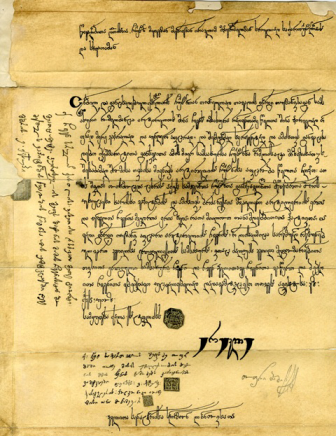

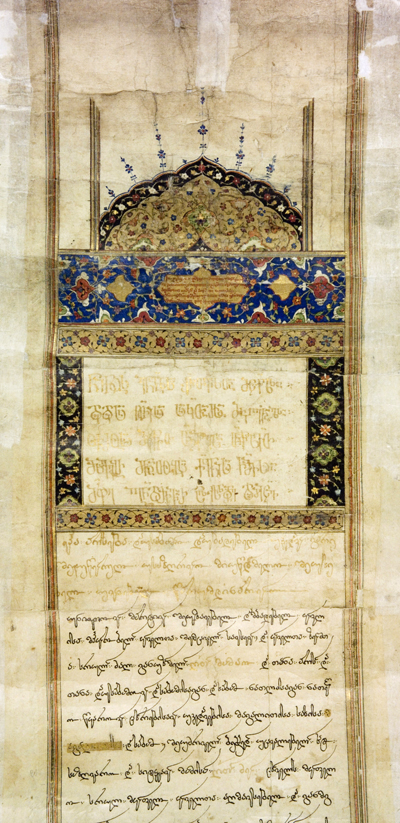

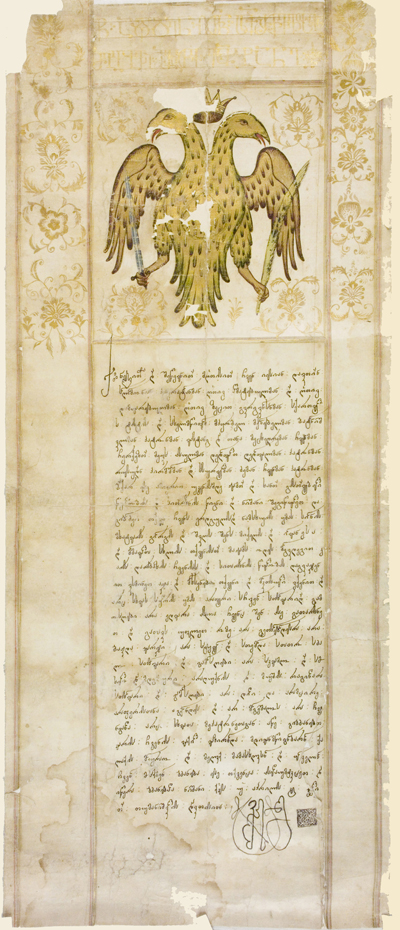

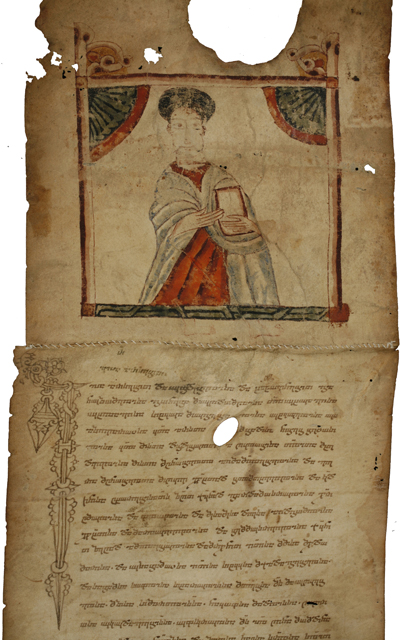

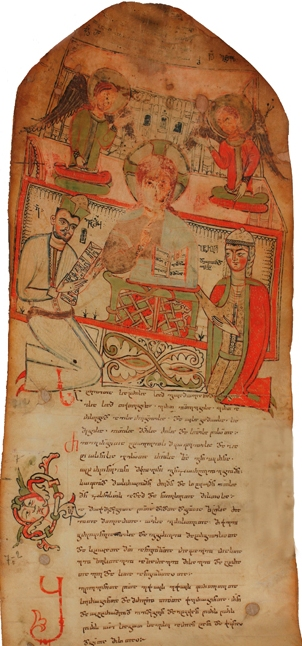

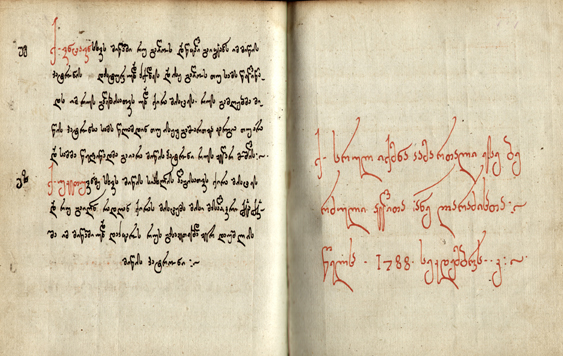

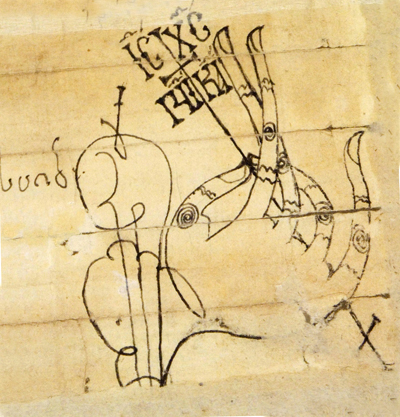

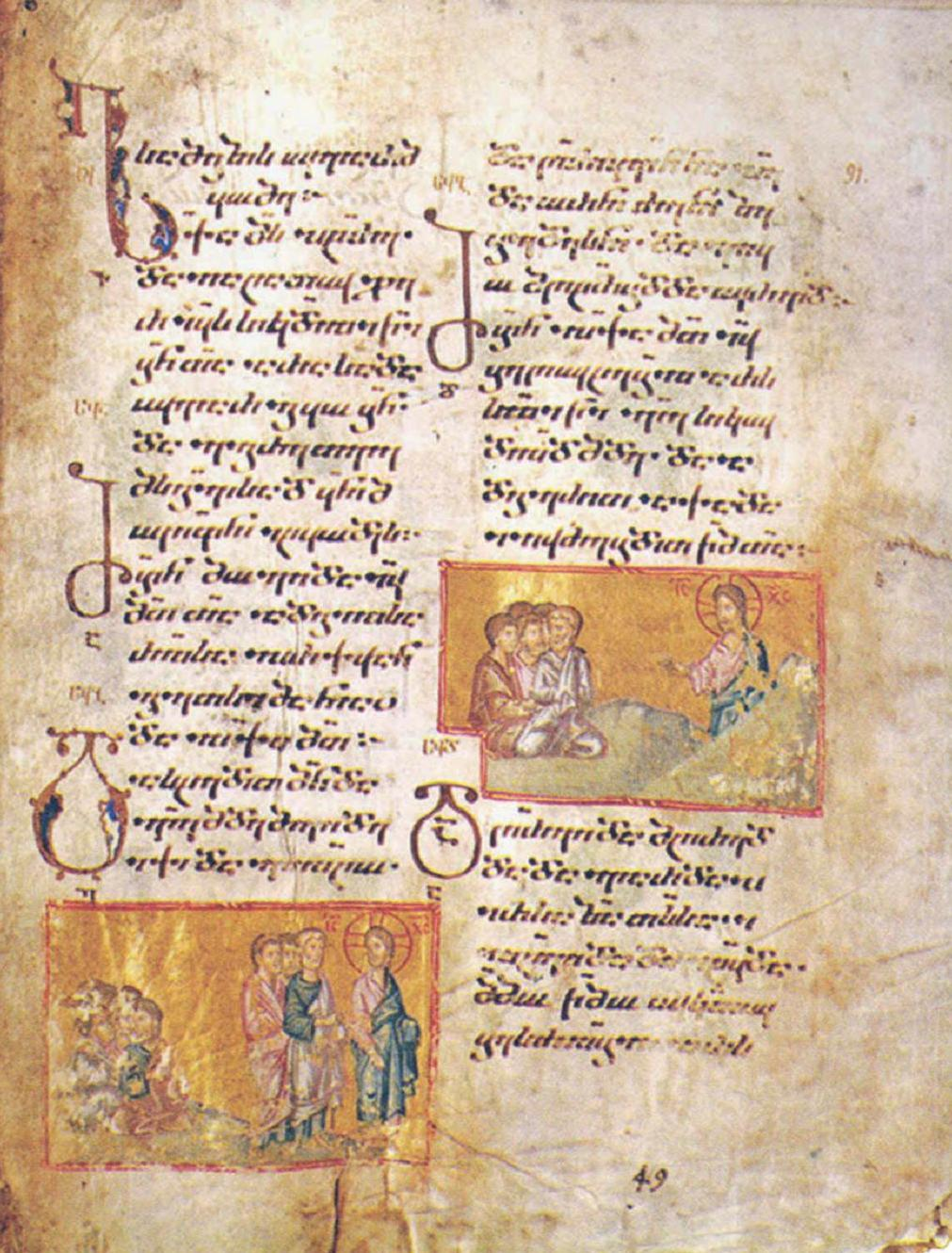

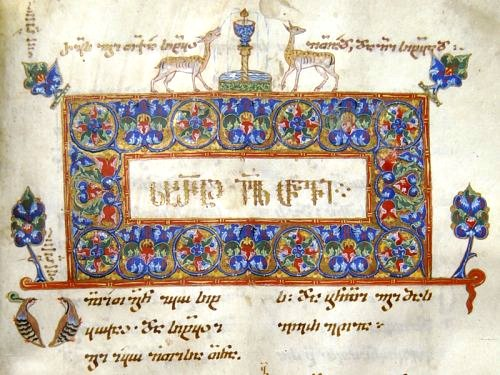

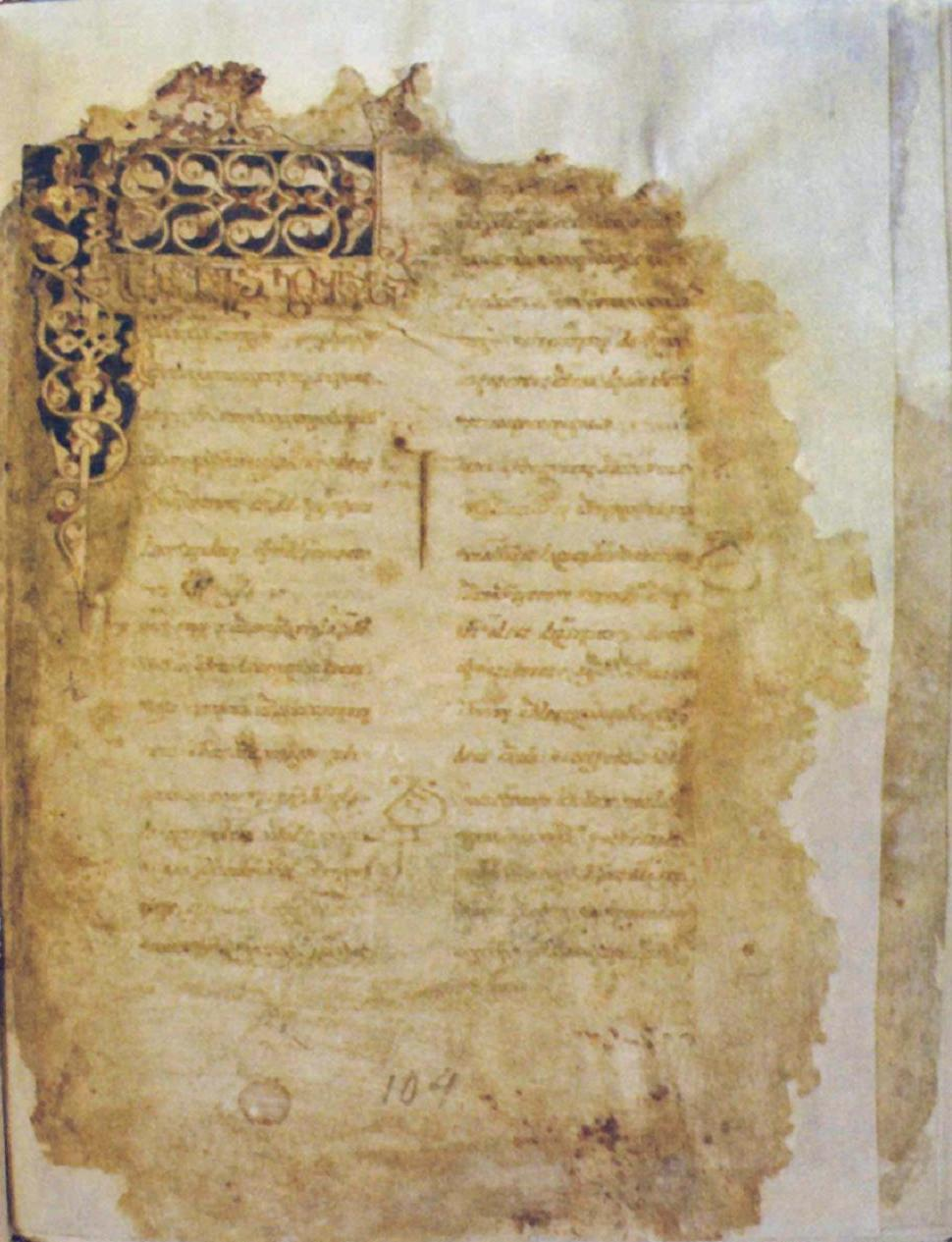

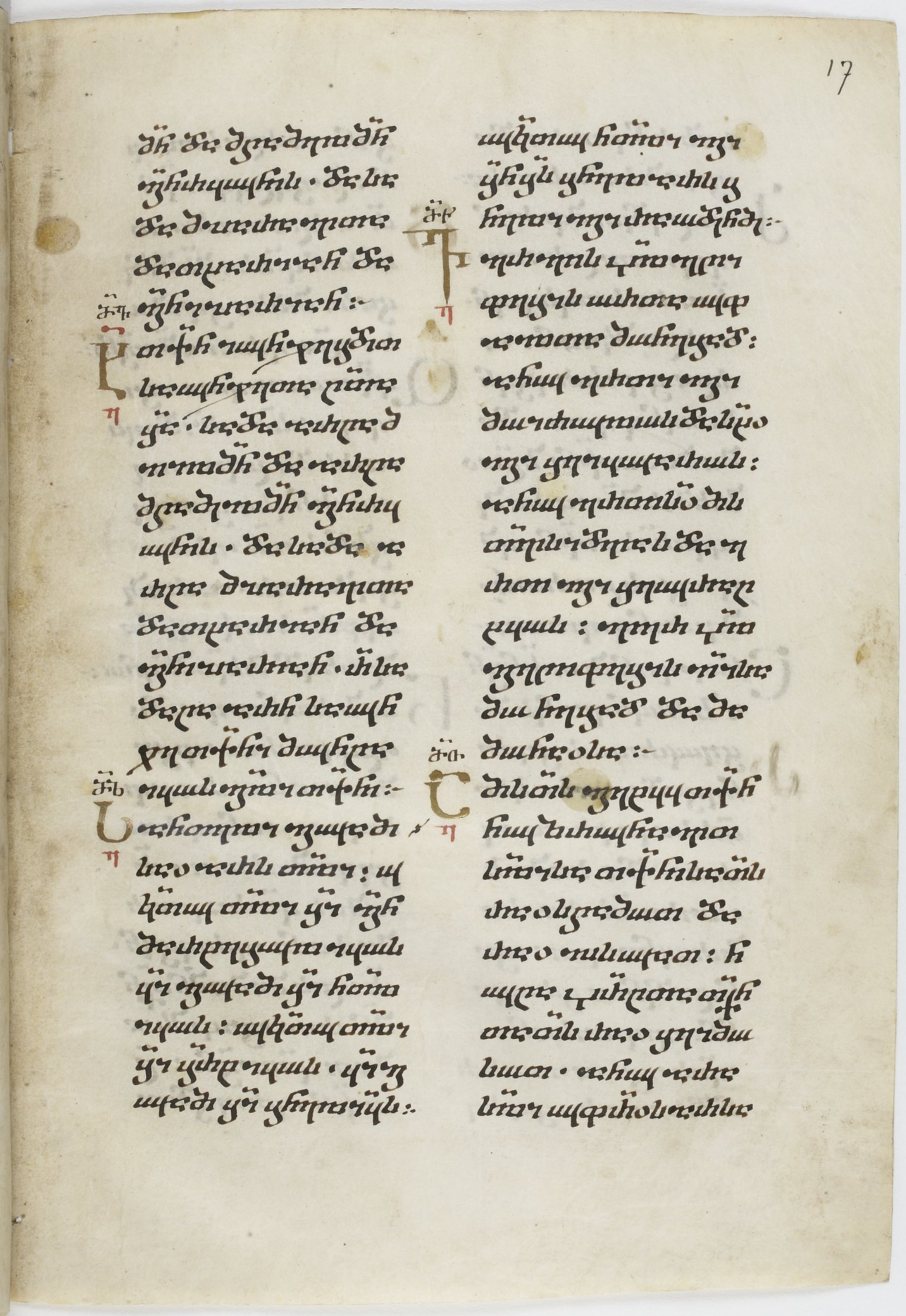

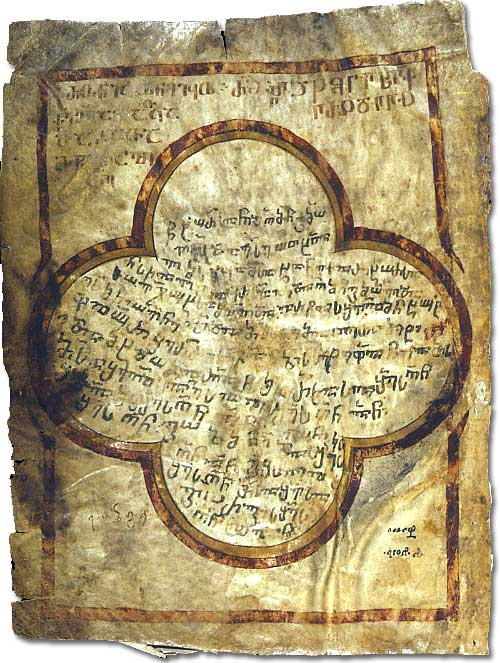

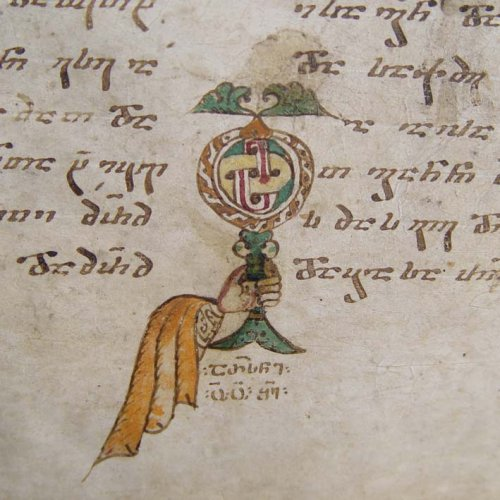

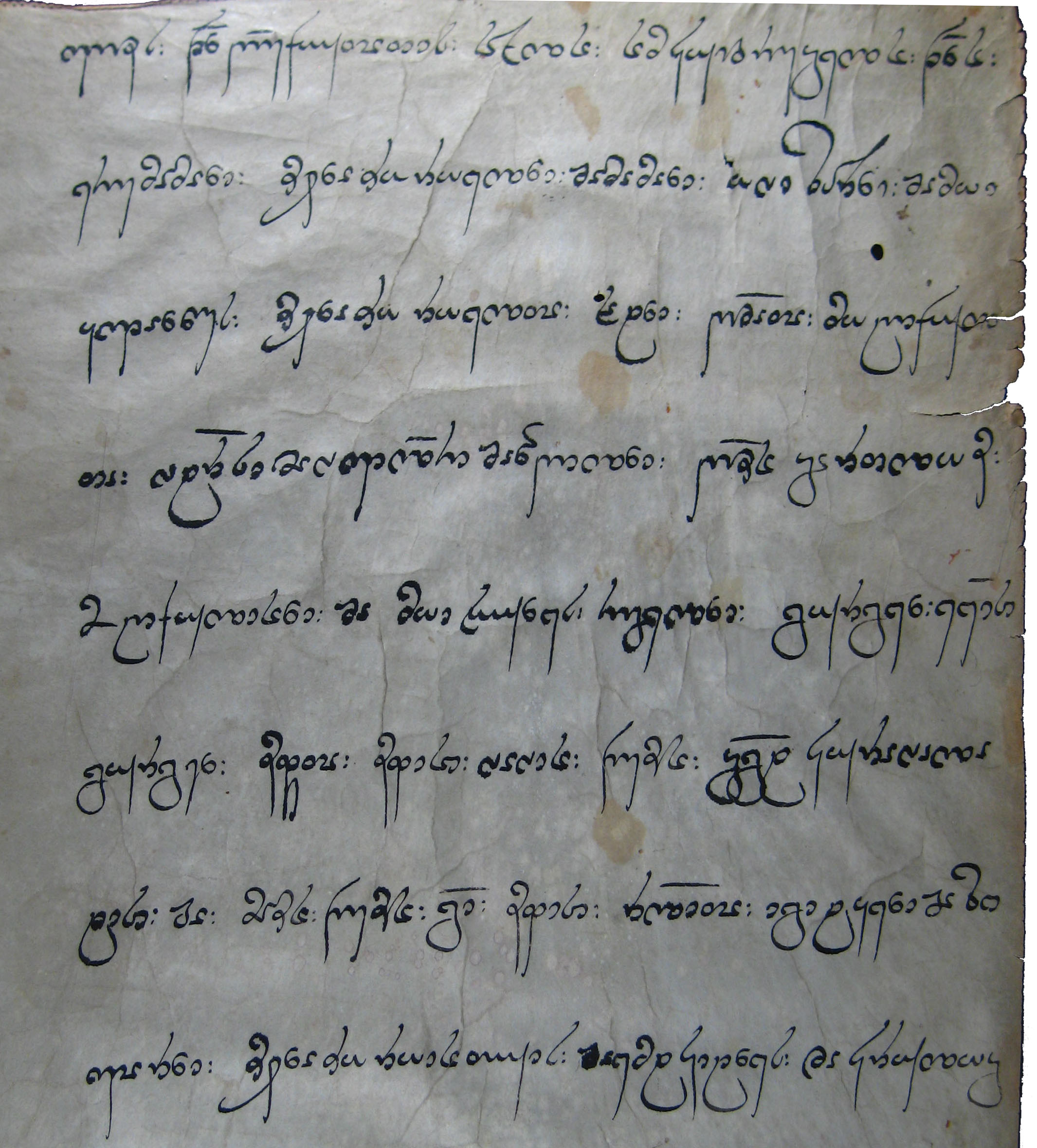

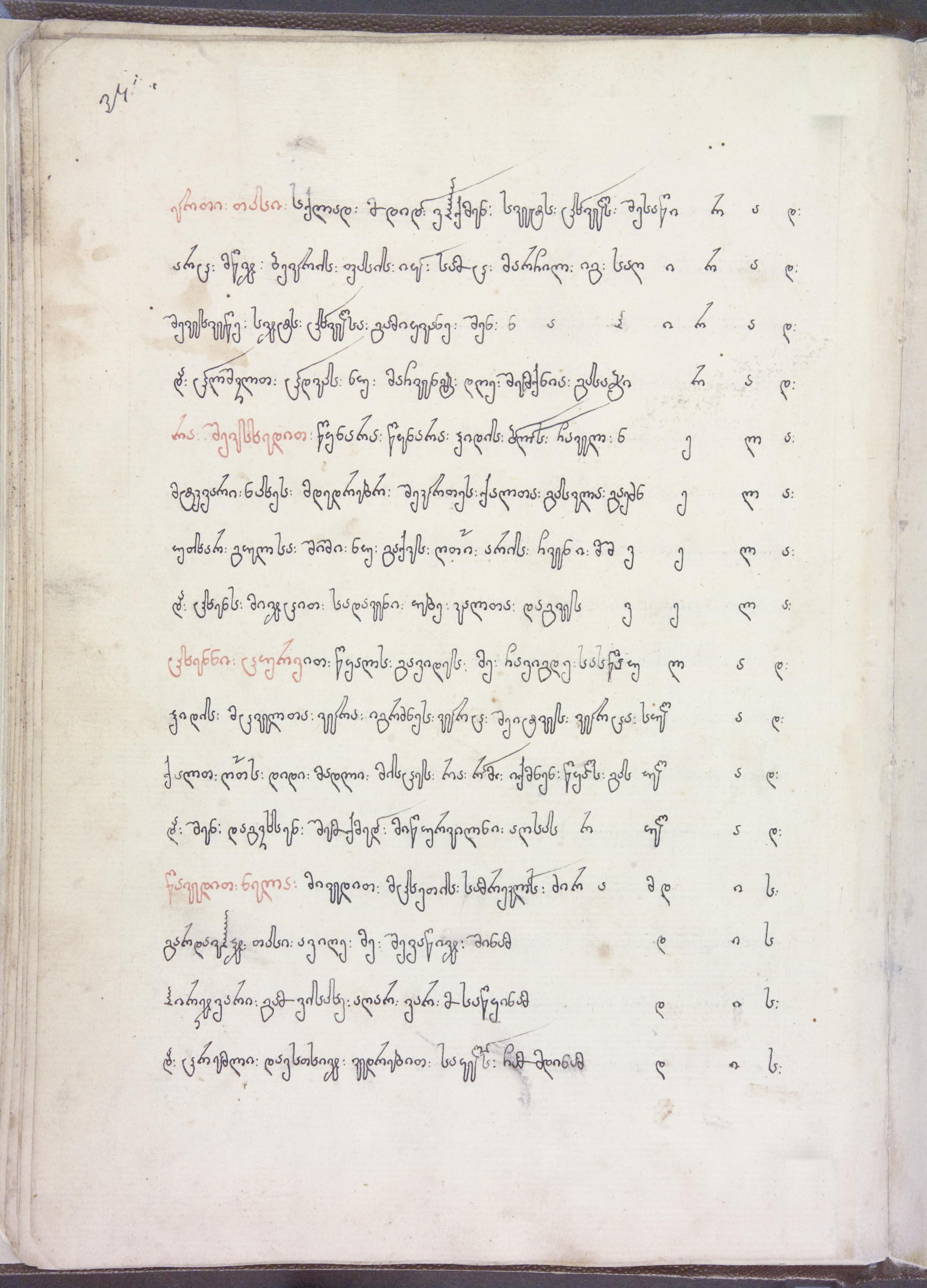

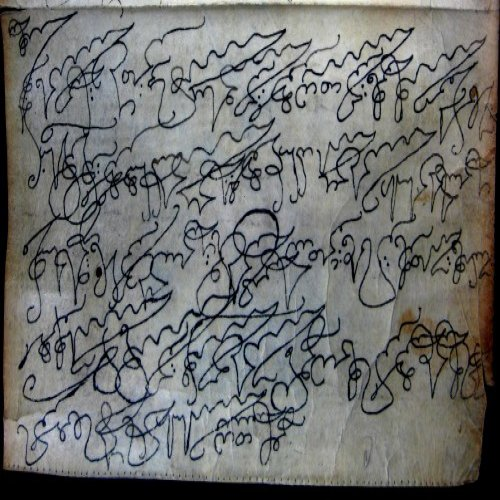

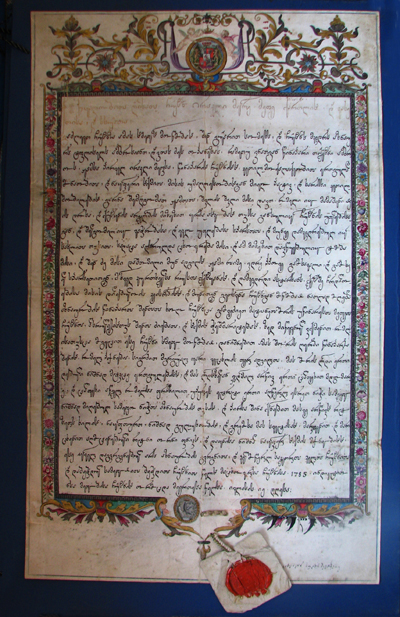

== See also ==
- Khelrtva
