= John I of Mtskheta =

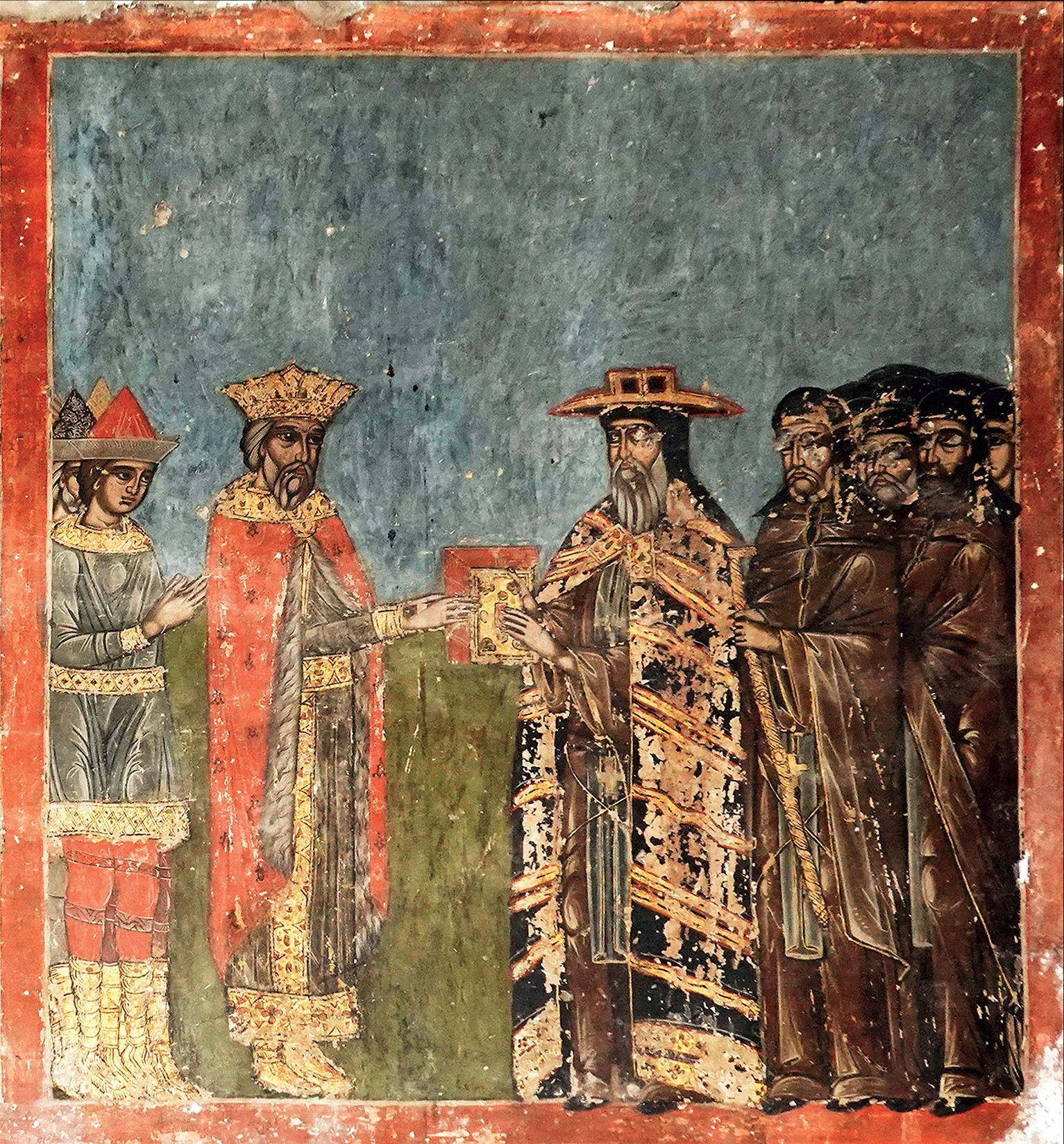
The first Christian king of Iberia, Mirian III (left) with his first Archbishop, John I.

John I of Mtskheta (Georgian: იოანე I) was the first archbishop of the Georgian Orthodox Church in period of 335–363.

== Bibliography ==
- საქართველოს კათალიკოს–პატრიარქები, რ. მეტრეველის რედაქციით, ნეკერი, თბილისი, 2000, გვერდი 10–11;
- მოქცევაჲ ქართლისაჲ, ძველი ქართული აგიოგრაფიული ლიტერატურის ძეგლები, წიგნი 1, ილ. აბულაძის რედაქცია, თბილისი, 1963;
- მოქცევაჲ ქართლისაჲ, შატბერდის კრებული X საუკუნისა, ბ. გიგინეიშვილისა და ელ. გიუნაშვილის გამოცემა, თბილისი, 1979;
- მოქცევაჲ ქართლისაჲ, ახლადაღმოჩენილი სინური რედაქციები, გამოსცა ზ. ალექსიძემ, თბილისი, 2007;
- ლეონტი მროველი, ცხოვრება ქართუელთა მეფეთა, წგნ.: ქართლის ცხოვრება, ს. ყაუხჩიშვილის გამოცემა, ტომი. 1, თბილისი, 1953.
- ქართული საბჭოთა ენციკლოპედია, ტ. 5, გვ. 190.ლომინაძე ბ, თბილისი, 1980 წელი.
