= Anton I of Georgia =

Patriarch of the Georgian Orthodox Church

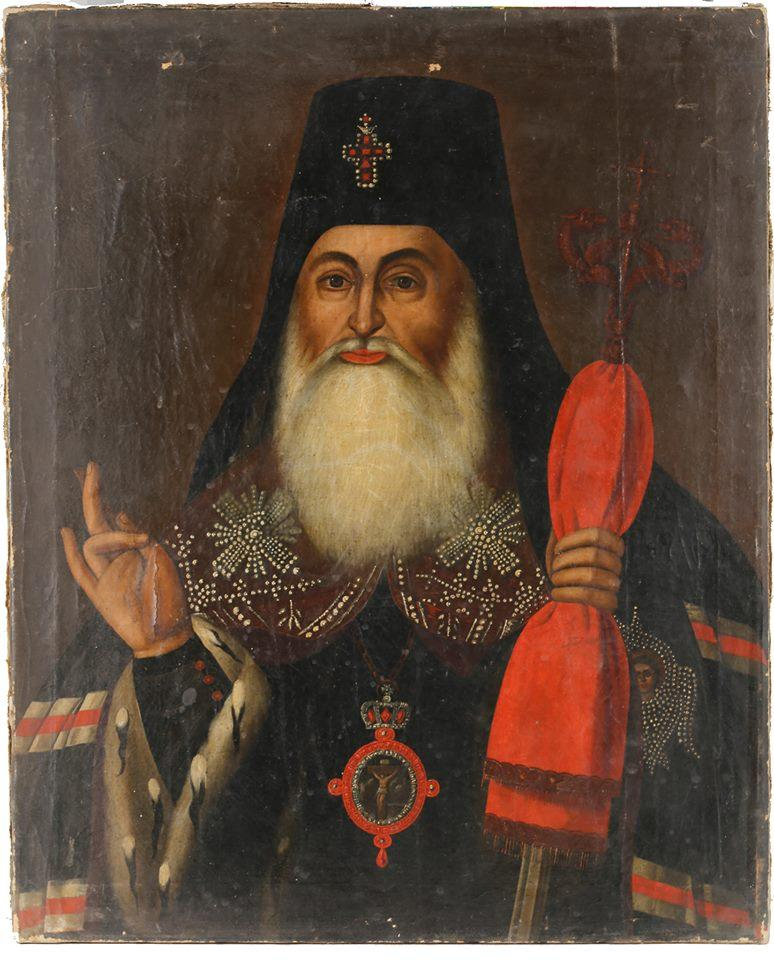
- Anton I as depicted in an 18th century oil painting.

Catholicos Patriarch of Georgia
- Tenure: 1744–1755; 1764–1788
- Predecessor: Nikoloz VIII
- Successor: Ioseb (Jandieri) (after 1st term); Anton II of Georgia (after 2nd term)
- Born: 28 October 1720
- Died: 12 March 1788 (aged 67)
- Burial: Svetitskhoveli Cathedral
- Dynasty: Bagrationi
- Father: Jesse of Kartli
- Mother: Helen-Begum of Kakheti
- Religion: Georgian Orthodox Church
- Khelrtva

Anton I (Georgian: ანტონ I; 28 October [O.S. 17 October] 1720 – 12 March [O.S. 1 March] 1788), born as Teimuraz Bagrationi, was the Catholicos–Patriarch of the Georgian Orthodox Church in the period 1744–1755 and again in 1764–1788.

== Biography ==
Being one of the sons of Jesse of Kartli by his wife Princess Helen-Begum (a daughter of King Heraclius I of Kakheti), Anton was born a royal prince (batonishvili). He was raised together with his cousin prince Heraclius, the future king Heraclius II, in Telavi, Kakheti. There, he studied in order to become priest, as well as learning the Greek, Tatar, and Persian languages. At age 15, Anton became engaged to the daughter of the influential politician Givi Amilakhvari, however, his bride was taken away by Nader Shah when the latter took Tbilisi in 1735. According to Prof. Alexander Mikaberidze, therefore, the reconquest of Georgia over the Ottomans by Nader Shah in 1735 through the Ottoman-Persian War of 1730-1735 had a profound effect on Anton, for he left the court and became a monk at the Gelati Monastery in 1738. Five years later, he moved to the Gareja Monastery in Kakheti, and was elected catholicos-patriarch of the Orthodox Church in 1744. In a row of important political events that occurred in 1744, this event coincided with the Iranian king Nader Shah granting the kingship of Kartli and Kakheti to Anton's uncle Teimuraz II and his cousin Heraclius II, respectively.

Anton established close relations with the Catholic missions active in Georgia and worked to improve contacts with Western Europe; regarding the former, he received criticism from the conservative clergy, who accused him of corrupting the Georgian Orthodox faith and trying to introduce Catholicism in Georgia. When Teimuraz II nullified the Catholic presence by moving them from Georgia, Anton's opponents took their chance. The ecclesiastical council led by Anton's opponent Zacharias A. Gabashvili, had Anton dismissed from his position on 17 December 1755, and he was succeeded by Catholicos-Patriarch Ioseb Jandieri. After his dismissal, which basically meant banishment, as well as 18 months of imprisonment, he moved to Russia, where he reportedly succeeded in getting himself cleansed from these charges at the Most Holy Synod of the Russian Orthodox Church on 16 March 1757, and was appointed Archbishop of Vladimir on 23 November 1757 by the decree of Empress Elizabeth.

Upon Heraclius II's invitation, in 1762, Anton returned to the newly established Kingdom of Kartli-Kakheti. In the subsequent church council, now back in his homeland, Anton I defeated the conservatives and was reelected to the position catholicos-patriarch in 1764, thus starting his 2nd term. He was involved in the political life of his cousin, and renewed his efforts to bring the Georgian principalities closer to Europe. In the years of 1772-1782 (he was sent in 1772 by Heraclius II himself, Anton took part in the negotiations which led up to the Treaty of Georgievsk of 1783.

Anton I died on 12 March 1788 and was buried in the Svetitskhoveli Cathedral in Mtskheta, in front of the king's gate.

=== Socio-cultural efforts ===
Anton was a generous supporter of the Georgian arts and literature, and supervised the establishment of a number of schools, which included the seminaries of Tbilisi and Telavi in 1755 and 1782 respectively. He personally directed the drafting of the curricula in these schools, wrote the textbook Qrtuli ghrammatika in 1753, and translated European treatises on physics, which he taught in seminaries. As further stated by Prof. Mikaberidze, he was instrumental in reorganizing the new ecclesiastical calendar, wrote original hymns and canons, and translated numerous Slavic Orthodox works into Georgian.

In 1769, Anton completed one of his greatest works named Martirika and began his long poetical study of the cultural history of Georgia, titled with the name Tsakobilstikvaoba. Responsible for directing the educational system in Kartli-Kakheti for a quarter of a century, as stated by Prof. Mikaberidze, under his guidance a new generation of Georgian artists, scientists, and writers were produced, amongst whom Ambrosi Nekreseli, Gaioz Rektori, Philip Qaitmazashvili, amongst others. Thanks to his efforts, he left a deep imprint on the 18th-century sciences in Georgia, specifically on philosophy and literature.

== Bibliography ==
- Dowsett, Charles (1997). Sayatʻ-Nova: An 18th-century Troubadour : a Biographical and Literary Study. Peeters Publishers. ISBN 978-9-06831-795-4.
- Mikaberidze, Alexander (2015). Historical Dictionary of Georgia (2 ed.). Rowman & Littlefield. ISBN 978-1-44224-146-6.
- Suny, Ronald Grigor (1994). The Making of the Georgian Nation. Indiana University Press. ISBN 978-0-25320-915-3.
