= David IV, Catholicos-Patriarch of Georgia =

David IV or V (Georgian: დავით IV/V, davit' IV/V) was a 15th-century Catholicos-Patriarch of Georgia known from the group of documents dated from 1447 to 1457. They testify to David's efforts to restore the patriarchal see of Mtskheta from the devastation of Timur's invasions earlier that century.

The scholarly opinion is divided as to whether David III is the same catholicos as David II (III) and David III (IV), mentioned in the years 1426–1428 and 1435–1439, respectively, or not. Traditional lists of the Georgian prelates, such as those compiled by Michel Tamarati and Roin Metreveli, and accepted by the Georgian Orthodox Church, place three different catholicoi named David in the 15th century, while some historians, especially Cyril Toumanoff, see in these names one and the same person, a son of King Alexander I of Georgia. The confusion arises from the three chronological groups of documents, while the inconsistency in the numerals after the catholical names is because some historians, like Tamarati, omit the catholicos David of 859–861.

== Notes ==
Eastern Orthodox Church titles
Preceded by Shio II	Catholicos-Patriarch of All Georgia; 1447–1457	Succeeded by Marcos
