= Eudemus I of Georgia =

Georgian churchman

Eudemus I
- His Holiness and Beatitude, the Catholicos-Patriarch of All Georgia
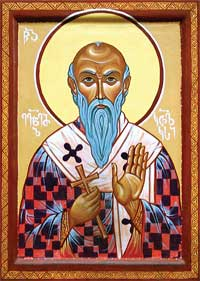
- Church: Georgian Orthodox Church

Personal details
- Born: Eudemus I Diasamidze
- Died: 1642
- Denomination: Eastern Orthodox Church
- Occupation: Catholicos-Patriarch
- Profession: Theologian
- Khelrtva

Eudemus I Diasamidze (Georgian: ევდემოზ I დიასამიძე, Evdemoz I Diasamidze; died 1642) was a Georgian churchman serving as Catholicos Patriarch of Georgia from 1632 until his death in 1642. His demise was occasioned by his involvement in a plot against the Muslim king of Kartli, Rostom-Khan, who had him arrested and put to death in prison. He was buried in the Anchiskhati church in Tbilisi. Eudemus was canonized by the Georgian Orthodox Church as a "holy hieromartyr", his feast day marked on 17 October [O.S. 4 October].

== Biography ==
Eudemus (Evdemoz) came of the princely family of Diasamidze. Prior to his installment as the catholicos patriarch in 1632, he is known to have served as Archbishop of Bodbe from 1617 to 1619. Eudemus's patriarchal tenure coincided with a major upheaval in the Georgian lands; in eastern Georgia—Kartli and Kakheti—King Teimuraz I waged a decades-long struggle against the Iranian hegemony, while western Georgian territories had been politically and ecclesiastically separated from the east. Eudemus was allied with and related by kinship to Teimuraz: his brotherly niece was married to Teimuraz's son and heir, Prince David. In 1633, Teimuraz was ousted from Kartli by the Muslim Georgian prince Rostom, who declared himself king and was confirmed by the shah of Iran as a wali. Teimuraz did not cease his opposition to the new regime and was still able to maintain foothold in his native Kakheti.

After Rostom's accession to the throne of Kartli and his strategically calculated marriage to Mariam Dadiani, a devout Christian princess from Mingrelia, Eudemus found in her an influential protector of the Christian church, but he remained in opposition to Rostom, accusing him of transplanting Iranian and Muslim customs into Georgia. In 1642, Eudemus joined the noblemen—Zaal, Duke of Aragvi, Nodar Tsitsishvili, and Giorgi Gochashvili—in a plot to assassinate Rostom and restore Teimuraz in Kartli. The plot was betrayed; its numbers either fled or were rounded up by Rostom's loyal forces. Teimuraz's courage fell and, in spite of Eudemus's urgings, he withdrew with his army back to Kakheti. Rostom had the catholicos arrested and imprisoned at the citadel of Tbilisi, where he was then strangled to death. His body was cast off a tower, retrieved by a group of Christians and buried in the northwest corner of Anchiskhati church in Tbilisi.

Eastern Orthodox Church titles
Preceded by Zachary	Catholicos-Patriarch of All Georgia; 1632–1642	Succeeded by Christophorus II
