= David II, Catholicos-Patriarch of Georgia =

Catholicos-Patriarch of Georgia]

David II
- The Catholicos-Patriarch of All Georgia

Orders
- Consecration: 1426

David II (Georgian: დავით II, Davit' II) was a 15th-century Catholicos-Patriarch of Georgia consecrated in 1426.

== Biography ==
Born into the Bagration dynasty, he was the fourth son of Alexander I, King of Georgia (r. 1412–1442), by his second wife, Princess Tamar of Imereti. There is no scholarly consensus regarding the duration of David II's tenure as some historians, such Michel Tamarati, place three different catholicoi named David—David II or III (1426–1428), David III or IV (1435–1439), and David IV or V (1447–1457)—in the course of the 15th century, the chronology also accepted by the Georgian Orthodox Church. Others, especially Cyril Toumanoff, see in these three names one and the same person, a son of Alexander I. The confusion arises from the three chronological groups of documents, while the inconsistency in the numerals after the catholical names is because some historians, like Tamarati, omit the catholicos David of 859–861.

According to Toumanoff, David, born c. 1417, was destined by his father for the church career at a young age and became, or was designated to become, a catholicos in 1426. In the view of Toumanoff, his tenure lasted until his death c. 1457, while the two other contemporary catholicoi, Theodore and Shio, mentioned in the years 1427–1434 and 1440–1446, respectively, were his locum tenentes with the title of catholicos while David was still very young and before he himself acceded to the primacy of the Georgian church c. 1447.

== Ancestry ==
Ancestors of David II, Catholicos-Patriarch of Georgia

16. David IX of Georgia
8. Bagrat V of Georgia
17. Sindukhtar Jaqeli
4. Constantine I of Georgia
18. Alexios III Megas Komnenos
9. Anna Megale Komnene
19. Theodora Kantakouzene
2. Alexander I of Georgia
10. Kutsna Amirejibi
5. Natia Amirejibi
11. Rusudan Rusa
1. David
24. Michael of Imereti
12. Bagrat I of Imereti
6. Alexander I of Imereti
26. Qvarqvare II Jaqeli
13. N.N.
3. Tamar of Imereti
14. Pelgini Orbeliani
7. Anna Orbeliani

== Notes ==
Eastern Orthodox Church titles
Preceded by Michael VI	Catholicos-Patriarch of All Georgia; 1426–1428	Succeeded by Theodore III
