= Domentius I of Georgia =

Domentius I (Georgian: დომენტი I, Domenti I) was a Georgian churchman and the Catholicos Patriarch of Georgia who presided over the Georgian Orthodox Church in the latter half of the 16th century. Surviving documents testify to Domentius' efforts to aggrandize the church's land properties and restore those holdings that had earlier been lost to secular noble landlords.

According to the early-18th-century royal historian Prince Vakhushti of Kartli, Domentius "was installed" as catholicos by King Simon I immediately after his accession to the throne of Kartli in eastern Georgia in 1556. Domentius' rule was limited to the eastern Georgian territories, with his see at Mtskheta; the west was under the jurisdiction of the breakaway Catholicate of Abkhazia. Even in the east, the Kingdom of Kakheti, run by a dynasty vying with their royal cousins in Kartli, tried to establish its own church. This attempt failed and Domentius was able to obtain pledges of loyalty from the Kakhetian bishops between 1556 and 1560. Further, in 1560, George, Crown Prince of Kakheti, restored to the see of Mtskheta a number of estates earlier lost by the church to that kingdom.

There is no consensus as to the duration of Domentius' tenure. The catholicos named Domentius is known from two chronological groups of documents from the late 16th century. The church historian Michel Tamarati identifies two catholicoi with this name from that period, Domentius I (1557–1560) and Domentius II (1595–1602). The Georgian Orthodox Church also follows this numbering, assigning the years 1556–1560 to Domentius I and c. 1595–1610 to Domentius II. In contrast, some historians, such as Kalistrate Salia, consider these two Domentius to have been one person, with two tenures (1557–1562, 1599–1603) with a gap of nearly four decades.

Eastern Orthodox Church titles
Preceded by Zebedee I	Catholicos-Patriarch of Georgia; 1556–1560	Succeeded by Nicholas VI
