= Jacob of Mtskheta =

Second archbishop of the Georgian Orthodox Church

Jacob of Mtskheta (Georgian: იაკობი) was the second archbishop of the Georgian Orthodox Church in period of 363–375.
