= Zachary of Georgia =

Patriarch of the Georgian Orthodox Church

Zachary
- His Holiness and Beatitude, the Catholicos-Patriarch of All Georgia
- Church: Georgian Orthodox Church

Personal details
- Born: Zakaria Jorjadze
- Denomination: Eastern Orthodox Church
- Occupation: Catholicos-Patriarch
- Profession: Theologian
- Khelrtva

Zachary, born Zakaria Jorjadze (Georgian: ზაქარია ჯორჯაძე), was the Catholicos–Patriarch of the Georgian Orthodox Church in the period 1623–1632.

Before that Zachary was the bishop of Nekresi in 1613–1623 and was the bishop of the Georgian royal Bagrationi dynasty.

== Bibliography ==
- ლომინაძე ბ., ქართული საბჭოთა ენციკლოპედია, ტომი 4, გვერდი 488, თბილისი, 1979 წ. Lominadze B., Georgian Soviet Encyclopedia, Volume 4, p488, Tbilisi, 1979
- თ, ჟორდანია, ქრონიკები, II, 1898.
- ქართული სამართლის ზეგლები, ი.დოლიძის გამოც. III, თბ. 1970.
- დონ კრისტოფორო დე კასტელი, ცნობები და ალბომი საქართველოს შესახებ, 1977.
- ბ. ლომინაძე, მასალები საქართველოს XVII-XVIII საუკუნეთA ისტორიის ქრონოლოგიისათვის,/მასალები საქართველოსა და კავკასიის ისტორიისათვის, 1951, ნაკვ.29.
- მ. თამარაშვილი, ისტორია კათოლიკობისა ქართველთა შორის, ტფილისი, 1902.
- ეკა კაჭარავა, ზაქარია ჯორჯაძე, საქართველოს კათალიკოს-პატრიარქები, რ. მეტრეველის რედ. ნეკერი, 2000.

Eastern Orthodox Church titles
| Preceded by Christophorus I | Catholicos-Patriarch of All Georgia; 1623-1632 | Succeeded by Eudemus I |
