= Shio II of Georgia =

15th-century Georgian prelate

Shio II
- Catholicos-Patriarch of All Georgia
- Reign: 1440–1443
- Predecessor: David III
- Successor: David IV
- House: Bagrationi dynasty
- Religion: Georgian Orthodox Church

Shio II (Georgian: შიო II) was a 15th-century Georgian prelate mentioned as the Catholicos Patriarch of Georgia in the documents dating from 1440 to 1443/47. Shio was a close associate of King Alexander I of Georgia, with whom he cooperated to restore the kingdom from the effects of the disastrous invasions by Timur earlier that century.

== Biography ==
Shio's tenure is preceded and succeeded by those of the catholicos named David, whom traditional lists of the Georgian prelates, such as those compiled by Michel Tamarati and Roin Metreveli, and that accepted by the Georgian Orthodox Church, identify as David III (1435–1439) and David IV (1443/47–1457), respectively. Some historians, especially Cyril Toumanoff, see in these names one and the same person, David II, a son of King Alexander I. Toumanoff, further, conjectures that Shio was a locum tenens for David II, who was designated by his father to become the prelate of the Georgian church at a very young age.

== Notes ==
- Metreveli, Roin (2000). საქართველოს კათოლიკოს–პატრიარქები [Catholicos-Patriarchs of Georgia] (in Georgian). Tbilisi: Nekeri.
- Toumanoff, Cyril (1949–51). "The Fifteenth-Century Bagratids and the Institution of Collegial Sovereignty in Georgia". Traditio. 7: 169–221. doi:10.1017/S0362152900015142. S2CID 149043757.

Eastern Orthodox Church titles
Preceded by David III	Catholicos-Patriarch of All Georgia; 1440–1443/47	Succeeded by David IV
