= Domentius II of Georgia =

Domentius II (Georgian: დომენტი II, Domenti II) was a Georgian churchman and the Catholicos Patriarch of Georgia who presided over the Georgian Orthodox Church from c. 1595 to 1610. Like his predecessors, Domentius pushed for the efforts to aggrandize the church's land properties and restore the holdings that had earlier been lost to secular noble landlords. Some historians such as Kalistrate Salia consider this Domentius to have been the same person as the earlier Catholicos Domentius I, who might have occupied his office twice, with a significant gap of nearly four decades.

Eastern Orthodox Church titles
Preceded by Dorotheus III	Catholicos-Patriarch of Georgia; 1595–1610	Succeeded by Zebedee II
