= Khelrtva =

Style of Georgian calligraphic signature

A khelrtva (Georgian: ხელრთვა, lit. 'graced by hand') (Note: The term literally means 'to grace, decorate, adorn or beautify with hand', kheli (ხელი) meaning a hand and rtva (რთვა), to decorate; adorn.) is a Georgian calligraphic joined-up style signature, monogram or seal, originally used by the Georgian monarchs, queens consort, patriarchs, royalty and nobility, universally used since the early eleventh century.

Khelrtva signatures were written in one of the three Georgian scripts, mostly in Nuskhuri and Mkhedruli scripts, though the monograms particularly the royal ones were designed in Asomtavruli script. Every Georgian monarch had their own individual khelrtva and was known as საუფლოჲ ხელი (sauploy kheli) literally meaning 'Hand of the Lord'. The tradition of khelrtvas is still in use in Georgia.

== Khelrtvas ==
=== Kings ===
Khelrtva of King Bagrat IV

Khelrtva of King George IV

Khelrtva of King Vakhtang VI

Khelrtva of King George XII

Khelrtva of King Solomon II

=== Queens regnant ===
Khelrtva of Queen Tamar I

Khelrtva of Queen Rusudan

=== Queens consort ===
Khelrtva of Queen consort Tinatin Gurieli

Khelrtva of Queen consort Ketevan the Martyr

Khelrtva of Queen consort Mariam Dadiani

=== Patriarchs ===
Khelrtva of Patriarch Zachary

Asomtavruli khelrtva of Patriarch Joseph

Khelrtva of Patriarch Anton II

Khelrtva of Patriarch Shio III

=== Presidents, Prime Ministers, Speakers ===
Khelrtva of President Salome Zurabishvili

Khelrtva of Prime Minister Irakli Kobakhidze

Khelrtva of Speaker Shalva Papuashvili

== See also ==
- Huaya (Japanese: 花押), stylised calligraphic signatures used in East Asia
- Tughra (Ottoman Turkish: طغرا), stylised Arabic signatures used by Ottoman sultans
