= Henriette von Crayen =

German salonist and noble

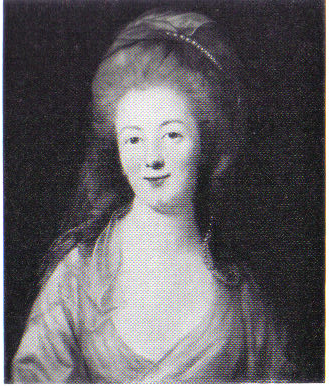
Henriette von Crayen by Anton Graff in 1783

Henriette von Crayen (November 1, 1755 – February 26, 1832), was a German salonist and noble. She held one of the most famous salons of contemporary Germany in Leipzig and Berlin. She was also famous for her many love affairs with a great number of famous people.
