= John VII of Georgia =

John VII (Georgian: იოანე VII) was Catholicos-Patriarch of All Georgia, from 1208 to 1210. He belonged to the group of reactionary monks that supported Georgian-Dyophysitism and condemned Armenian Miaphysitism. His activities resulted by baptizing Ivane Mkhargrdzeli, the ruler of Dvin and Vaspurakan, and a great number of Armenians with him.

== Sources ==
- Lominadze, B. (1980). "იოანე" (PDF). Georgian Soviet Encyclopedia (in Georgian). Vol. 5. Tbilisi. p. 187.
