= Yelena Shidyanskaya =

Military commander

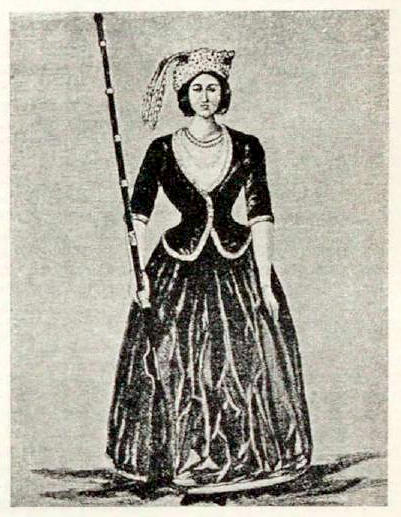
- Native name: Елена Ивановна Шидянская
- Born: 1755
- Died: 1849 (aged 93–94) Simferopol, Crimea
- Allegiance: Russian Empire
- Rank: Captain
- Commands: Amazon company

Yelena Ivanovna Shidyanskaya (Russian: Елена Ивановна Шидянская) nee Yelena Ivanovna Sardanova (Russian: Елена Ивановна Сарданова), 1755–1849) was a Greek-Russian military commander.

She was an ethnic Greek Crimean appointed commander of the "Amazon company" appointed by Grigory Potemkin to serve during the visit of Catherine the Great to the Crimea in 1787. While this military unit was largely ceremonial and existed only during Catherine's visit, it was nevertheless formally a military unit during its existence, and Yelena Shidyanskaya was thereby the first woman in Russia to be appointed to the post of commander of a military unit.
