= Basil IV of Georgia =

Basil IV was Catholicos-Patriarch of All Georgia, from 1206 to 1208, during the reign of Queen Tamar. His name is mentioned in manuscripts of Shio-Mgvime monastery dated to 1270.
