= Roin Metreveli =

Soviet politician, Georgian academic and historian (born 1939)

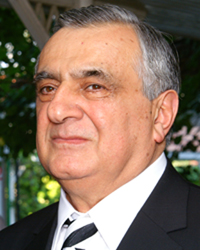
- Born: December 7, 1939 (age 86); Abastumani, Adigeni Municipality, Samtskhe–Javakheti, Georgian SSR, Soviet Union

Academic background
- Education: Tbilisi State University

Academic work
- Discipline: History
- Institutions: Tbilisi State University; Georgian Academy of Sciences (GAS)

Roin Metreveli (Georgian: როინ მეტრეველი; born 7 December 1939) is a Georgian academician and historian. He was the first elected rector of the Tbilisi State University, after Petre Melikishvili and Ivane Javakhishvili. Metreveli served as a secretary of the Central Committee of the Georgian Communist Party during the Soviet Union, from 1960 to 1972, and subsequently as its first secretary. From 1972, he was a major editor of the Georgian Encyclopedia. He is the author of scientific publications and books about Georgian history and Caucasiology. For several years, he was a member of the Georgian Parliament. He was chairman of the board of rectors of all Georgian Universities.

In June 2023, Roin Metreveli was appointed as President of the Georgian National Academy of Sciences.

He was elected a Member of the CORE Academy (International Core Academy of Sciences and Humanities) in 2024.

In his first days in office, Metreveli promised a prank caller that he would award membership of the academy to Prime Minister Irakli Garibashvili, an incident that received attention on media and social media. In the coverage of this, a journalist for Mtavari described Metreveli as "the most successful briber of the Soviet era. You wouldn’t be able to enrol in university if you didn’t [give Metreveli money]".

== Tbilisi State University ==
In 1991 Roin Metreveli was appointed as Rector of Tbilisi State University. In 1992 under his leadership, Tbilisi State University regained its status as an autonomous institution, which had been lost since 1926. Once the Tbilisi State University became autonomous, the Great Scientific Council was reinstated and this council had to choose a new executive. In April 1992 a new council elected Roin Metreveli as Rector of Tbilisi State University. He was the first elected rector after Petre Melikishvili and Ivane Javakhishvili. In 1997 Professor Roin Metreveli was elected for a second term as a rector. Metreveli resigned in 2004, amidst a campaign to reduce corruption and bribery in the higher education sector.
