= Michel Tamarati =

Georgian Catholic priest and historian (1858-1911)

The Reverend Michel Tamarati
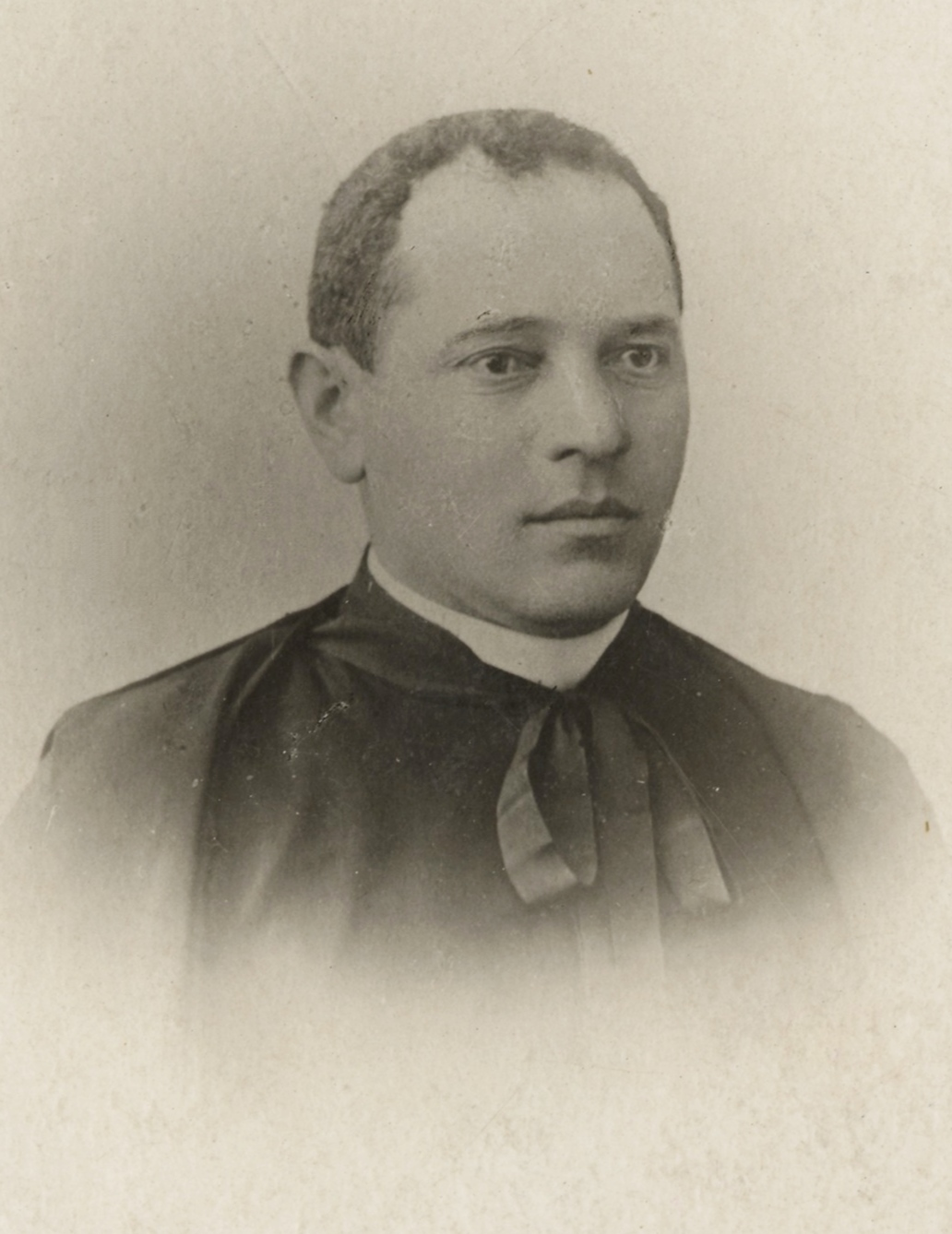

Personal life
- Born: Alexander Tamarashvili; September 1858 Akhaltsikhe, Tiflis Governorate, Russian Empire
- Died: September 16, 1911 (aged 52–53) Santa Marinella, Kingdom of Italy

Religious life
- Religion: Catholic Church
- Ordination: 1888

Military service
- Rank: Priest

Michel Tamarati (born Alexander Tamarashvili; Georgian: ალექსანდრე თამარაშვილი; September 1858 – September 16, 1911) was a Georgian Catholic priest and historian. He is known for his oft-cited French-language history of the Georgian Christianity, L'Eglise géorgienne des origines jusqu' à nos jours, published in Rome in 1910. He died in 1911 while trying to rescue a drowning man in a stormy sea near Santa Marinella, Italy.

== Education and career ==
Michel Tamarati was born as Alexander Tamarashvili (ალექსანდრე თამარაშვილი) to a Georgian Catholic family in Akhaltsikhe, then part of the Russian Empire. He received his early education in Akhaltsikhe and Kutaisi before continuing his studies at a Georgian Catholic parish college in Constantinople in 1878. After three years of study in Spain, he returned to Constantinople, where he was ordained as a priest under the name of Michel (მიხეილ, Mikheil). In 1888, he graduated from the Seminary of St. Lazarus in Paris and returned to Georgia, where he became an abbot at the Roman Catholic church of the Assumption in Tiflis. Considered by the Imperial Russian authorities to be politically unreliable, Tamarashvili left Georgia and finally settled, in 1891, in Rome, where he, now known as Michel Tamarati, obtained a doctorate in theology from the Pontifical Academy of St. Thomas Aquinas in 1894. He spent years in the archives of Europe, studying the hitherto unexplored history of Roman Catholicism in Georgia and the Georgian–Western European cultural and political interaction. His landmark research in this area, ისტორია კათოლიკობისა ქართველთა შორის ("History of Catholicism among Georgians"), appeared in Georgian in Tiflis in 1902.

== L'Eglise géorgienne ==
Tamarati's best-known work, L'Eglise géorgienne des origines jusqu' à nos jours ("The Georgian church from the beginning to the present"), was published in Rome in 1910, winning a special prize from the Holy See. Although outdated, this book remains the most comprehensive treatment of Christianity in Georgia. It also had a decidedly political purpose. It sought to emphasize the role of Catholicism in the cultural and political relations between Georgia and Western Europe. It further criticized the abrogation of the centuries-old Georgian autocephaly by fellow-Orthodox Christian Russia and the heavy-handed policies of the Russian Empire against the resurgent Georgian autocephalist movement. According to the historian David Marshall Lang, "the Russian Embassy in Rome bought up and destroyed as many copies of this important and revealing work as it could."

== Death and commemoration ==
Tamarati died while trying to rescue a drowning man in stormy sea near Santa Marinella at the age of 53 in 1911. His remains were transferred from his resting place in Civitavecchia to the Didube Pantheon in Tbilisi in 1978. In 2011, a memorial service on the occasion of the 100th anniversary of Tamarati's death was held at the Congregation of St. Joseph in Albano Laziale, led by Bishop Gino Reali of Porto-Santa Rufina and attended by Khétévane Bagration de Moukhrani, Ambassador of Georgia to the Holy See and Marcello Celestini, Ambassador of the Sovereign Military Order of Malta to the Holy See. A memorial mass in Tamarati's honor was also held at the Roman Catholic Cathedral of Assumption of St. Mary in Tbilisi, Georgia.

Most of the documents related to the life and scholarship of Tamarati is preserved in the archive of the National Center of Manuscripts in Tbilisi.
