= Zaal Davitishvili =

Zaal Davitishvili (Georgian: ზაალ დავითიშვილი; c. 1744 – 1801), was a Georgian feudal lord (tavadi) and a representative of the Bagration-Davitishvili family, a cadet branch of the Kakhetian line of the Bagrationi dynasty. He was the last ruler of the princely domain of Sadavitishvilo from 1782 until 1801.

== Biography ==
=== Origin ===
The Bagration-Davitishvili family descended from Prince David, son of the blinded crown prince Demetrius (batonishvili), son of King (mepe) Alexander I of Kakheti. After losing royal status during the dynastic crisis of the 16th century, David's son Ramaz married the daughter of King Bagrat III of Imereti and received extensive estates in Upper Kartli, establishing the family's domain of Sadavitishvilo with its centre at Nuli. The family later rose to prominence at the court of Kartli. Prince Elizbar Davitishvili (1605–1666) served as bokaul-tukhutsesi for three decades under King Rostom and undertook important diplomatic missions. His granddaughter Tamar married King Giorgi XI of Kartli in 1678, further strengthening the family's ties to the royal house. By the time of Zaal's birth, the family possessed centuries-old history, extensive estates, and close ties to the ruling dynasty.

=== Early life and military service ===
Zaal Davitishvili was born around 1744. In February 1761, at approximately seventeen years of age, he participated in military action alongside Heraclius II, King of Kakheti (later King of Kartli-Kakheti), repelling a Lezgin raid on the family estate at Sative.The royal court subsequently exempted Sative from military conscription and provisions supply, leaving a local detachment for self-defence. In 1764, Zaal acted as a scribe in the execution of a deed of sale of peasants between Kaikhosro Amirejibi and Demetre Gedevanishvili, demonstrating his literacy and legal competence. In the same year, his relative Prince Ioane Davitishvili petitioned for the grant of an estate, which was approved by Heraclius II.

=== Legal disputes and career ===
In 1771, Zaal, together with his uncles David and Elizbar, complained to the king against Prince Papuna Pavlenishvili, who had acquired the village of Brotsleti from David Davitishvili without seeking the consent of the elder of the family – Zaal's father, Prince Giorgi. The king referred the dispute to Prince Glakha Tsitsishvili.

In 1776, Zaal and Elizbar were involved in a legal dispute concerning the peasant status of Shiosh Sakvarelidze, who complained that they claimed him as a hereditary serf. King Heraclius II ruled in favour of Shiosh, deciding that he was a royal peasant.

== Ruler of Sadavitishvilo ==
After his father's death in 1782, Zaal became head of the family and ruler of Sadavitishvilo. In 1783, an assembly of judges of Kartli-Kakheti, confirmed by Heraclius II, settled a land dispute between Zaal and his cousin Elizbar over the village of Gogieti and the share of the childless uncle David. The village was divided in half: Zaal, as the descendant of the elder brother, received the senior portion and additionally one day's worth of arable land, while Elizbar received the middle portion and three days' worth of land. In 1787, Elizbar complained again that Zaal was not allocating his share. In the same year, Iotam Tatishvili accused Zaal of seizing the Tatishvili estate. Heraclius II instructed the mdivanbeg Iase Amilakhvari to examine the case and, if the seizure was confirmed, to return the estate to its owner. In February 1789, Zaal sent his eldest son Rostom with a detachment to the Karabakh Khanate; Heraclius II granted the warriors a two-year exemption from taxes. In the same year, the king issued a decree on the unimpeded collection of food taxes from Upper Kartli, which was under Zaal's administration. On 18 June 1789, Zaal purchased peasants from Giorgi Amilakhorishvili. In November 1789, Zaal complained to the king about Elizbar: previously Heraclius II had granted Zaal the peasant Bagatar Tatishvili, but Elizbar had disputed this grant. The king ordered Otar Amilakhvari to either deliver Bagatar to Zaal or take compensatory property from Elizbar and transfer it to Zaal.

In August 1792, Zaal petitioned the king for the return of his peasant, who was in Kvareli under the supervision of Priest Kokorashvili. Heraclius II ordered the eshikagasbashi Garsevan to return the man to Zaal. In 1793, Zaal and Elizbar acted as mediators in a land dispute between Iese and Sukhan Taktakishvili, reviewing the division of peasants, vineyards and land plots. In November 1794, Zaal complained of Ossetian raids on his domains. The king ordered the amirajib Zaza to detain guilty Ossetians and hand them over to Zaal.

In 1797, a court established on behalf of Queen Darejan and Prince Vakhtang examined a land conflict between Zaal and the sons of Shanshe Ramazishvili (a cadet branch of the Davitishvili). The court established that Zaal had arbitrarily destroyed boundary markers and sentenced him to amputation of his right hand; the disputed lands were confirmed as belonging to the Ramazishvili. The decision was confirmed by Queen Darejan and Prince Vakhtang on 18 December 1797. At the same time, the mediators ruled that half of David's share remained with Zaal's children, while the other half passed to Elizbar's son Ioane. In 1799, Zaal built a defensive tower on the left bank of the Prone River (near the village of Ptsa), which served as a refuge for peasants during raids. In 2020, the tower was restored with funds from the Kartu Foundation.

In June 1800, a court of Prince Ioane (son of Giorgi XII) examined a claim by Shanshe Ramazishvili against Zaal over a disputed estate. The court ruled in Zaal's favour: he was appointed to take an oath with eight jurors, but the Ramazishvili refused to allow them to take the oath, which was treated as an admission of their testimony. The estate remained with Zaal. In September 1800, Zaal petitioned King Giorgi XII against Prince Avalishvili, who was detaining his peasant despite a ruling by Heraclius II. The king confirmed this ruling and ordered the peasant returned to Zaal.

== Later life and death ==
In March 1801, after the abolition of the Kartli-Kakheti kingdom (18 January 1801), a judicial hearing took place between Zaal Davitishvili and Shanshe Ramazishvili regarding peasants and an estate. The case was heard by Prince Ioane, who ruled that Zaal must take an oath with four princes and four sons of nobles. If the oath was taken, Zaal would be recognised as being in the right and the Ramazishvili documents relating to the case would be seized; otherwise, Zaal would have to allocate a share to the Ramazishvili. On 13 September 1801, Zaal petitioned Emperor Alexander I concerning peasants of the Kindzati estate who had not paid quitrent for several years. The Civil Government of Georgia instructed Prince Giorgi Amilakhvari to resolve the matter. Zaal died later that year.

== Family ==
Zaal was married to the daughter of Prince Ramaz Palavandishvili, amirajibi and Prince of Sapalavando. They had two sons:

- Knyaz Rostom Zaalovich Bagration-Davydov (died 1850); his legitimate descendants were recognised in princely dignity in the Russian Empire by Imperial Decree on 21 December 1849;
- Knyaz Giorgi Zaalovich Bagration-Davydov

== See also ==
- Bagrationi dynasty
- Bagration-Davitishvili
