= Elizbar Davitishvili =

Georgian nobleman

Elizbar Davitishvili (Georgian: ელიზბარ დავითიშვილი; fl. 1605–1666), also known as Elizbar-beg, was a Georgian high-ranked feudal lord (tavadi), military commander, and court official of the mid-seventeenth century. A member of the Bagration-Davitishvili branch of the royal Bagrationi dynasty, he served as bokaultukhutsesi (Lord High Steward) for three decades under Kings Rostom and Vakhtang V of Kartli. He played a crucial role in the political and military affairs of the Kingdom of Kartli during a period of Safavid Persian domination.

== Biography ==
Elizbar belonged to the princely house of Bagration-Davitishvili. This cadet branch of the Bagrationi royal dynasty traced its descent from Prince Demetrius, the youngest son of King Alexander I of Kakheti. After Alexander was murdered and Demetrius was blinded by his usurping brother, King George II "the Wicked", the prince's descendants lost their claim to the Kakhetian throne and relocated to Kartli, where they established themselves as tavadi princes and consolidated their holdings into an appanage known as Sadavitishvilo. His grandmother was a daughter of King Bagrat III of Imereti.

Elizbar's father, Prince David II Tvaldamtsvrishvili, was a prominent nobleman at the courts of Kartlian kings Simon I, Luarsab II, and Rostom. He held the highest court offices, including bokaultukhutsesi, eshikaghasbashi, and mdivanbeg of the Zemo-Akhaldaba and Dirbi regions. Elizbar's mother came from the noble Palavandishvili family. Born around 1605, Elizbar first appears in historical records in 1608, when King Luarsab II granted the village of Abano in Upper Kartli to his father David and his sons Constantine and Elizbar. The royal charter confirmed the village "with all that belongs to it—mountains, valleys, fields, vineyards, river, mill, arable land, and meadows". Further grants followed in 1610, 1614, and 1615, confirming and expanding the family's possessions.

The situation changed dramatically after 1615, when Shah Abbas I, enraged by the defiance of King Luarsab II, invaded Kartli. The kingdom was devastated, and many nobles either perished or fled. David, who had remained loyal to Luarsab, escaped to Persia with his family, including the ten-year-old Elizbar. At the Safavid court, they found refuge alongside Khosro-Mirza (the future King Rostom of Kartli), a royal bastard. During their approximately twenty years in exile, Elizbar received a Persian education, learned the language and customs of the Safavid court, and acquired the Turkified name "Elizbar-beg". In 1625, Khosro-Mirza participated in a Persian military expedition against the rebellious King Teimuraz I. After the Battle of Marabda, in which the Georgian forces were defeated, Khosro-Mirza returned to Isfahan. When Shah Abbas I died in January 1629, Khosro-Mirza, as qullaraghasi (commander of the royal guard), ensured the peaceful succession of Safi I and became one of the most influential figures in the Safavid state.

In 1633, Shah Safi I appointed Rostom as king of Kartli. Elizbar and his father returned to Georgia as part of Rostom's entourage. Rostom confirmed the Davitishvili family's ancestral holdings and offices, and Elizbar assumed the position of bokaultukhutsesi, one of the highest court dignities in the Kartlian kingdom. According to the Georgian chronicler Prince Vakhushti Bagrationi, Rostom "established court officials in the manner of the Qizilbash, but did not abolish Georgian customs, and established both". On 21 July 1633, Rostom confirmed the Davitishvili family's rights to their patrimonial estates. In 1634, a court case resolved a land dispute between David-beg and his nephew Ramaz. Presided over by King Rostom, Queen Mariam, Catholicos Eudemus I, and other leading nobles, the court ruled in favor of David and his sons Constantine and Elizbar. Thus, a completely new branch — the house of Ramazishvili — emerged from the main line of the princely house of Davitishvili. This branch would subsequently frequently attempt to contest the fiefs of the senior line of the house. In 1635, Rostom granted David II and his sons the office of mouravi in Dirbi, with Elizbar explicitly named as bokaul-tukhutsesi.

In 1639, a rebellion broke out led by Prince Nodar Tsitsishvili, joined by Duke Zaal of Aragvi, Prince Iotam Amilakhvari, and the Catholicos-Patriarch Eudemus I. The conspirators planned to overthrow Rostom and replace him with George Gochashvili, the only son of the late spaspet Gocha Batonishvili (cadet branch of kartlian Bagrations). King Rostom, upon receiving news of the rebellion, summoned his forces. He entrusted Elizbar with command of the army's rearguard, instructing him: "Stand in the rearguard and, whoever has able horses, send them quickly—with God's help, I will reach Nodar by morning". In the ensuing battle at Khovle in Sadzavakhiano, Rostom's forces achieved victory. According to the contemporary historian Parsadan Gorgijanidze, prisoners were taken by the soldiers of several noble houses, including the men of Elizbar. The captive princes were sent to the shah's court, and Elizbar was entrusted with escorting them. Nodar Tsitsishvili fled to Samtskhe, and Rostom laid siege to his fortress of Mdzovreti.

King Rostom, who had no biological children, needed an heir. His choice fell upon Prince Luarsab, great-grandson of King Luarsab I and Elizbar's nephew through his sister. Elizbar was sent on a diplomatic mission to Shah Safi I to seek permission for Luarsab to relocate to Kartli as the official heir. The mission succeeded, and Elizbar personally escorted his nephew from Isfahan to Tbilisi, presenting him to the Kartlian nobility as the future king. However, the news displeased George Bagration-Gochashvili, who had hoped to succeed Rostom himself. A conspiracy soon formed involving Catholicos Eudemus I and George. The plot was uncovered; the Catholicos was executed, and George was blinded. In 1652, while King Rostom was inspecting the construction of the Gatekhili Bridge, Prince Luarsab requested permission to cross the Kura River to hunt. Despite the king's initial reluctance, he eventually consented. According to Gorgijanidze, Luarsab was struck by a musket ball and fatally wounded. Rostom immediately dispatched Elizbar to the scene, but the prince died the following day. An investigation and judicial duel failed to identify the culprit, and Luarsab remained unavenged.

In 1648, relations between Rostom and King Teimuraz I of Kakheti reached a breaking point. Shah Abbas II accused Teimuraz of involvement in the murder of King Simon II, and Rostom received authorization to conquer Kakheti. The decisive battle took place at Magaro, on the outskirts of Kiziki, near old Anagi. Rostom's forces defeated the Kakhetian army, and Prince David, the son of Teimuraz, was killed. Elizbar was part of the embassy that delivered Prince David's head and the captured banners of Teimuraz to Shah Abbas II. As a reward, the shah granted Elizbar three villages in the Ganja district. Kakheti was subsequently annexed to Rostom's domains. After Rostom's death in 1658, Elizbar continued his service under his successor, King Vakhtang V. He also performed judicial functions, and records of his decisions in land disputes from 1654 and 1658 have survived. Both rulings, confirmed by royal authority, favored church peasants in disputes over lands belonging to the Svetitskhoveli Cathedral. Elizbar Davitishvili died in 1666.

== Family ==
Elizbar was married to Tinatin, daughter of Kaikhosro, Prince of Mukhrani. They had three sons and one daughter:

- David (fl. 1675–1725), who inherited his father's titles and the principality of Sadavitishvilo. His daughter, Tamar, married King George XI;
- Constantine;
- Khosia (fl. 1678–1692);
- an unnamed daughter, who married Prince Kaikhosro Tsitsishvili, son of Parsadan Tsitsishvili.
