= Mtskheta Municipality =

Coordinates: 41.8500°N 44.7167°E

Mtskheta Municipality მცხეთის მუნიციპალიტეტი
- Municipality
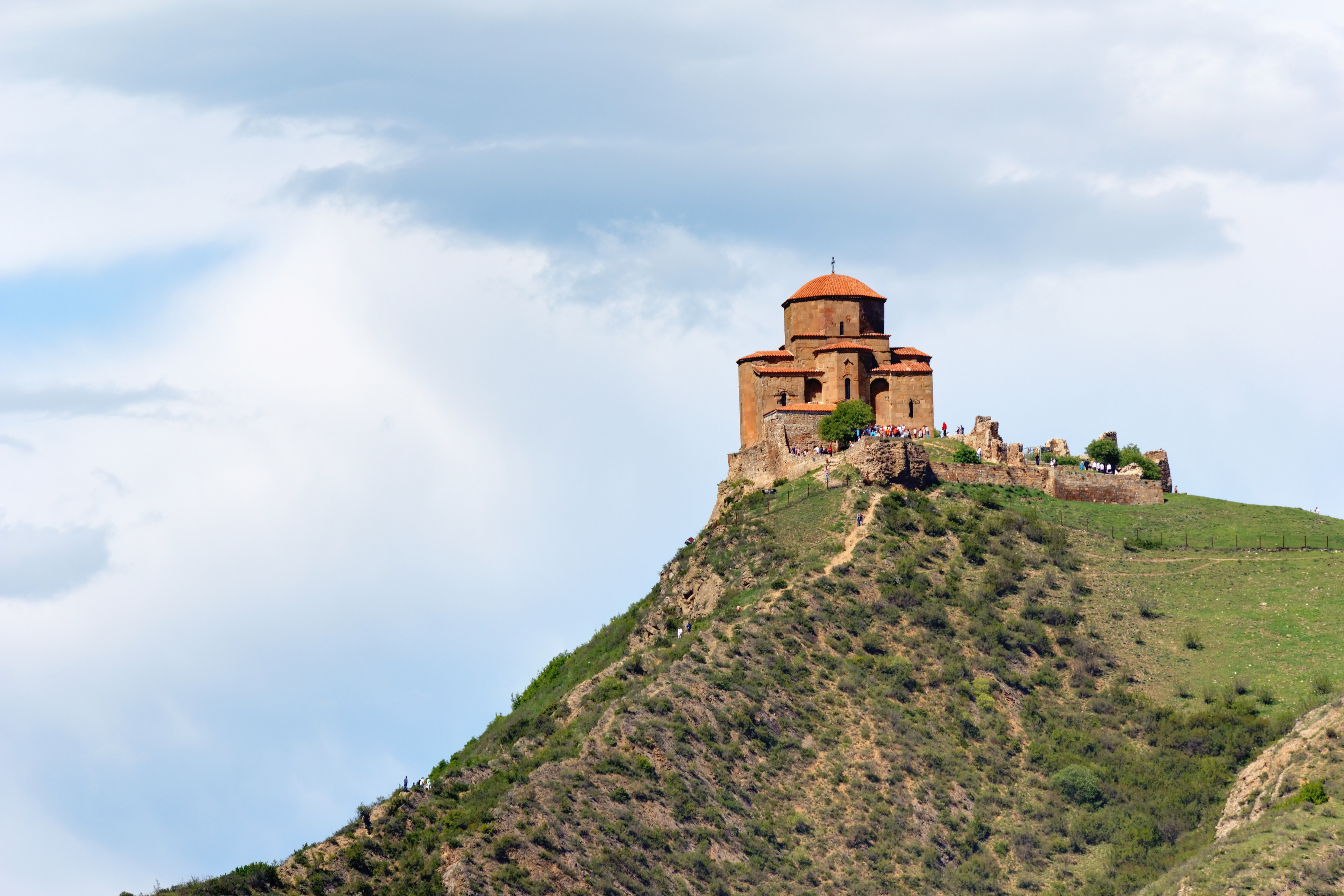
- Jvari monastery

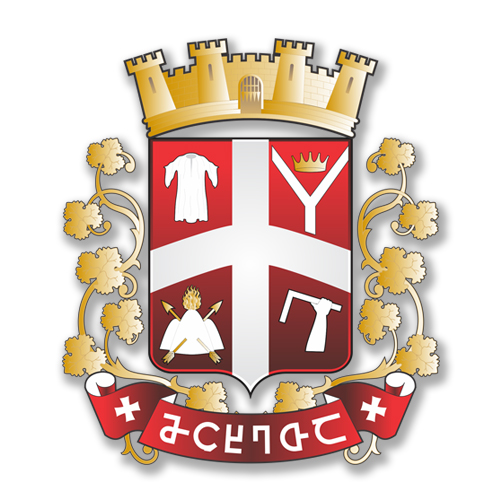
- Flag Seal

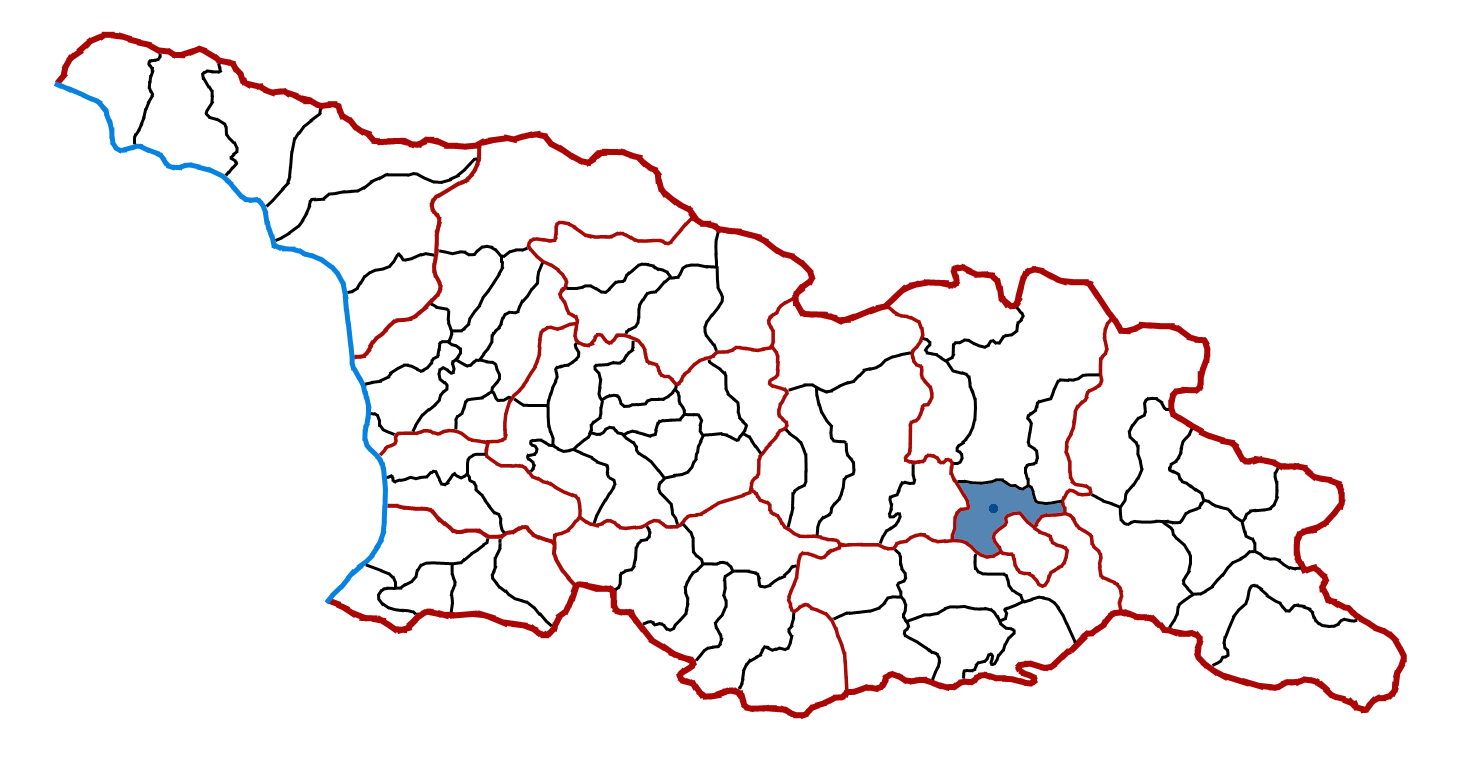
- Location of the municipality within Georgia
- Country: Georgia
- Region: Mtskheta-Mtianeti
- Administrative centre: Mtskheta

Government
  - Body: Mtskheta Municipal Assembly
  - Mayor: Giorgi Kapanadze

Area
  - Total: 668 km^{2} (258 sq mi)

Population (2014)
  - Total: 47,711
  - Density: 71.4/km^{2} (185/sq mi)

Population by ethnicity
  - Georgians: 92.04 %
  - Azerbaijanis: 4.15 %
  - Assyrians: 1.27 %
  - Ossetians: 1.23 %
  - Armenians: 0.47 %
- Time zone: UTC+4 (Georgian Standard Time)
- Website: http://mtskheta.gov.ge/ka/home

Mtskheta (Georgian: მცხეთის მუნიციპალიტეტი) is a district of Georgia, in the region of Mtskheta-Mtianeti. Its main town is Mtskheta. Population of Mtskheta Municipality - 47 711 inhabitants. The municipality includes one city (Mtskheta) and 63 settlements. The city is the municipal center of Mtskheta and its population is 7,940 inhabitants or 13% of the population of the municipality. The largest village is Mukhrani with 6,197 inhabitants.

== Geography and climate ==
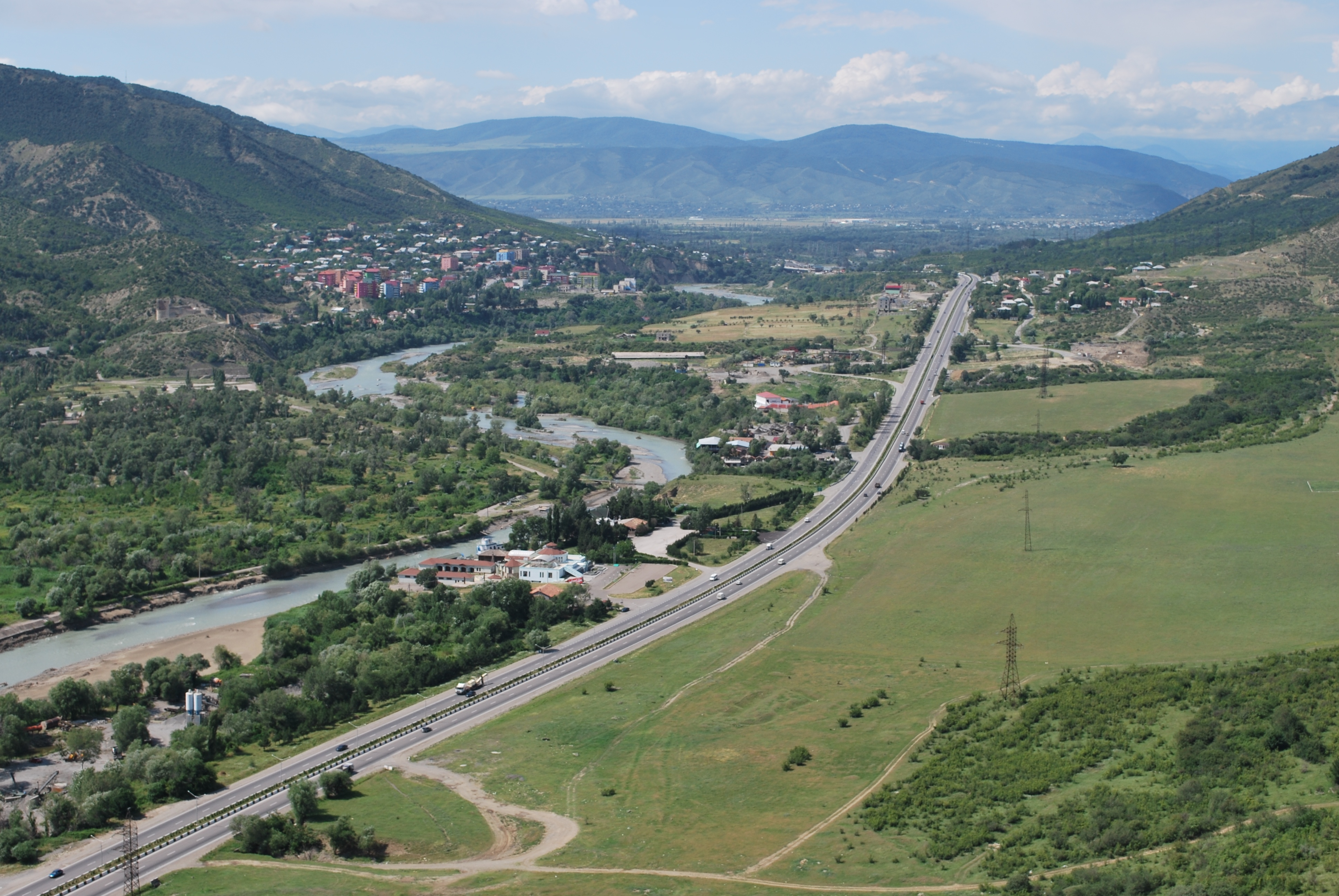
River Aragvi

Mtskheta Municipality is located in Mtskheta-Mtianeti region of eastern Georgia. Its administrative center is the city of Mtskheta. The municipality is bordered by Sagarejo Municipality to the east, Kaspi Municipality to the west, Dusheti and Tianeti to the north, Gardabani and Tetritskaro municipalities and also Tbilisi to the south. The region is characterized by a variety of natural conditions. The territory of Mtskheta is a low and mid-mountain region. In its southern part, the Saguramo Ridge is carved, to the south-east is raised the Satskepela Ridge. Its eastern end is called the Armazi Range, which is 1125 m high. There is a hillock of Skhaltbi between the rivers Ksani and Aragvi.

One of the main morphological elements of the municipality is the plain of Mukhrani-Saguramo. The Mtkvari River flows on the territory of the district, the main tributaries of which are: Khekordzula, Aragvi, and Dighmistskali. There are also lakes in the region. Mtskheta is distinguished by its diversity of flora and fauna. Saguramo Nature Reserve includes Caucasian deer, Capreolus, brown bear, wolf, fox, lynx, rabbit, otter, and more. There is a moderately humid subtropical climate in Mtskheta municipality. There is a moderately humid climate with hot summers and cold winters on Mukhrani-Saguramo plain. The average annual air temperature is 10.8 °C and -1.1 °C in January. On the ridges of Skhaltbi and Saguramo, there are mild cold winters and long warm summers.

== History ==
The area was still inhabited during the Bronze Age, as indicated by the settlements of Samtavro, Tsitsamuri, Narekvavi, and other settlements. From the beginning of the I millennium BC, the great shifts characteristic of the life of the largest political entity in the East have also reflected on the history of Mtskheta. The strong cultural invasion of Mtskheta significantly affected the life of the city until the 3rd to 4th centuries. According to legend, the city was founded by the ethnarch Mtskhetos. From the end of the 4th century, BC Mtskheta was the political center of the newly created Kartli (Iberian) kingdom. According to legend, Nino, a missionary from Jerusalem, preached Christianity in Mtskheta at the beginning of the 4th century. In 326, Mirian III adopted a new religion and Christianity became the state religion. According to legend, by the prayer of St. Nino hurricanes and hail broke out and crushed Armazian idols.

At the beginning of the 6th century, Dachi Ujarmeli moved the capital from Mtskheta to Tbilisi. Mtskheta has lost its political significance, though it has remained a religious center. In the early medieval period, there was an active rebuilding of cult buildings in the city. Samtavro, Jvari, Antioch, and more were built during this period. In 736–738, the Arab Commander-Marwan the deaf raided the city and destroyed Armazi Fortress. At the beginning of the 15th century, it was destroyed by Temur lang. The importance of Mtskheta gradually diminished and after the accession of the Kingdom of Kartli to Russia, it was a small village in the Dusheti Mazra. Mtskheta became a separate district in 1930–34, today it has the status of a city and a municipality.

== Politics ==
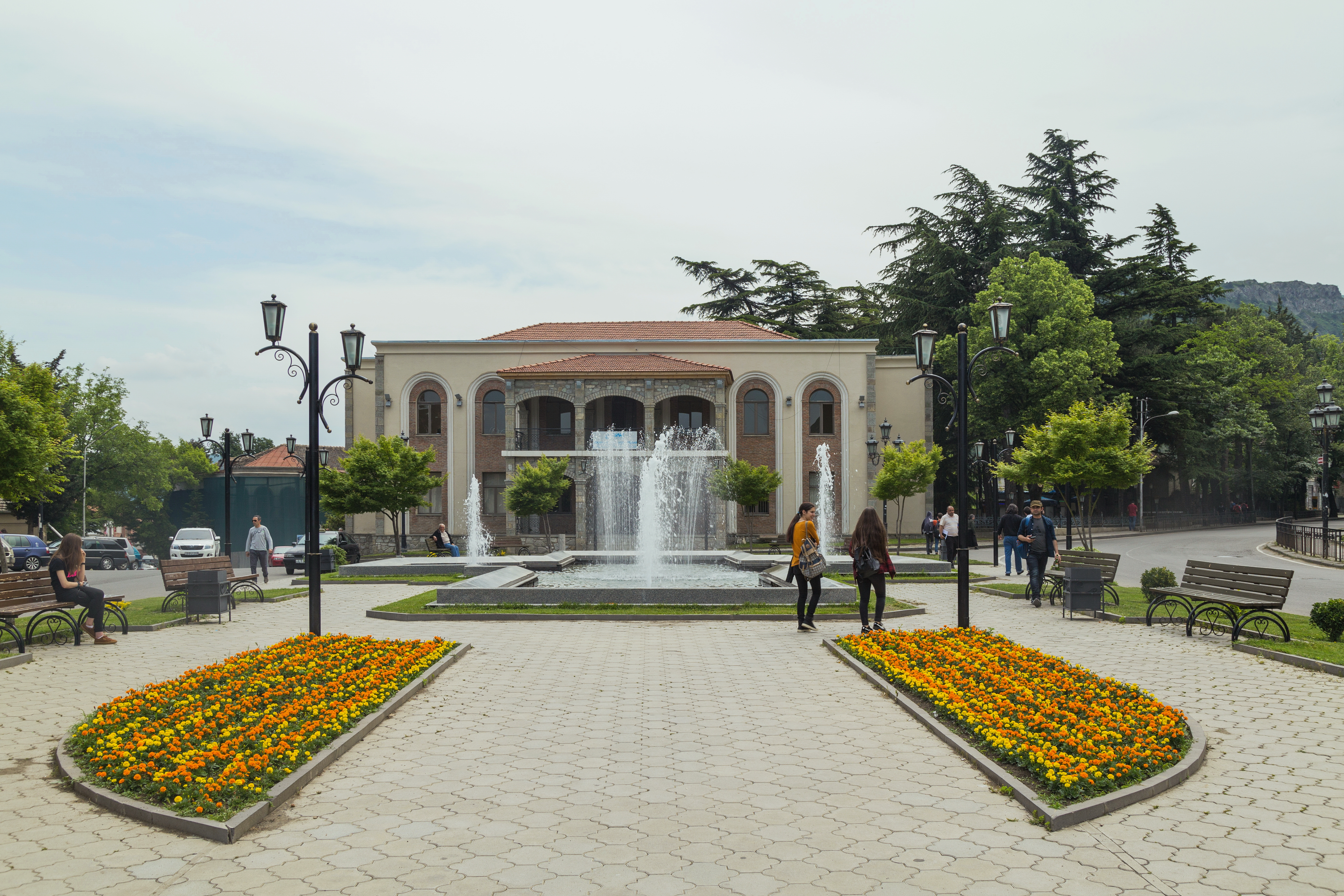
Mtskheta downtown

Mtskheta Municipal Assembly (Georgian: მცხეთის საკრებულო) is a representative body in Mtskheta Municipality. currently consisting of 27 members. The council is assembled into session regularly, to consider subject matters such as code changes, utilities, taxes, city budget, oversight of city government, and more. Mtskheta sakrebulo is elected every four years. The last election was held in October 2021.

Party	2017	2021	Current Municipal Assembly
Georgian Dream	23	19	
United National Movement	2	7	
For Georgia		1	
Alliance of Patriots	2		
European Georgia	1		
Labour Party	1		
Total	29	27	

== Cultural monuments ==
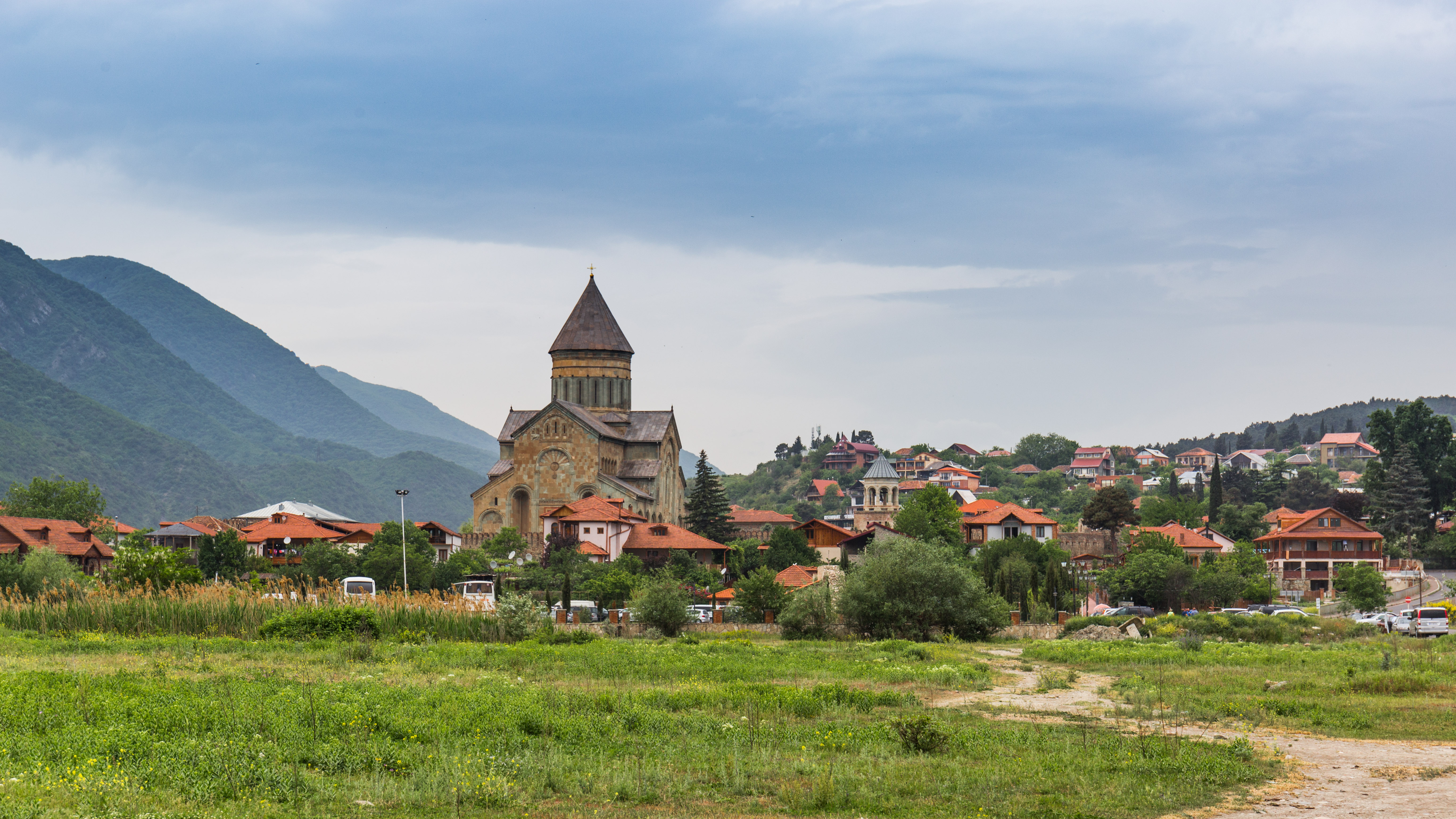
Svetitskhoveli Cathedral

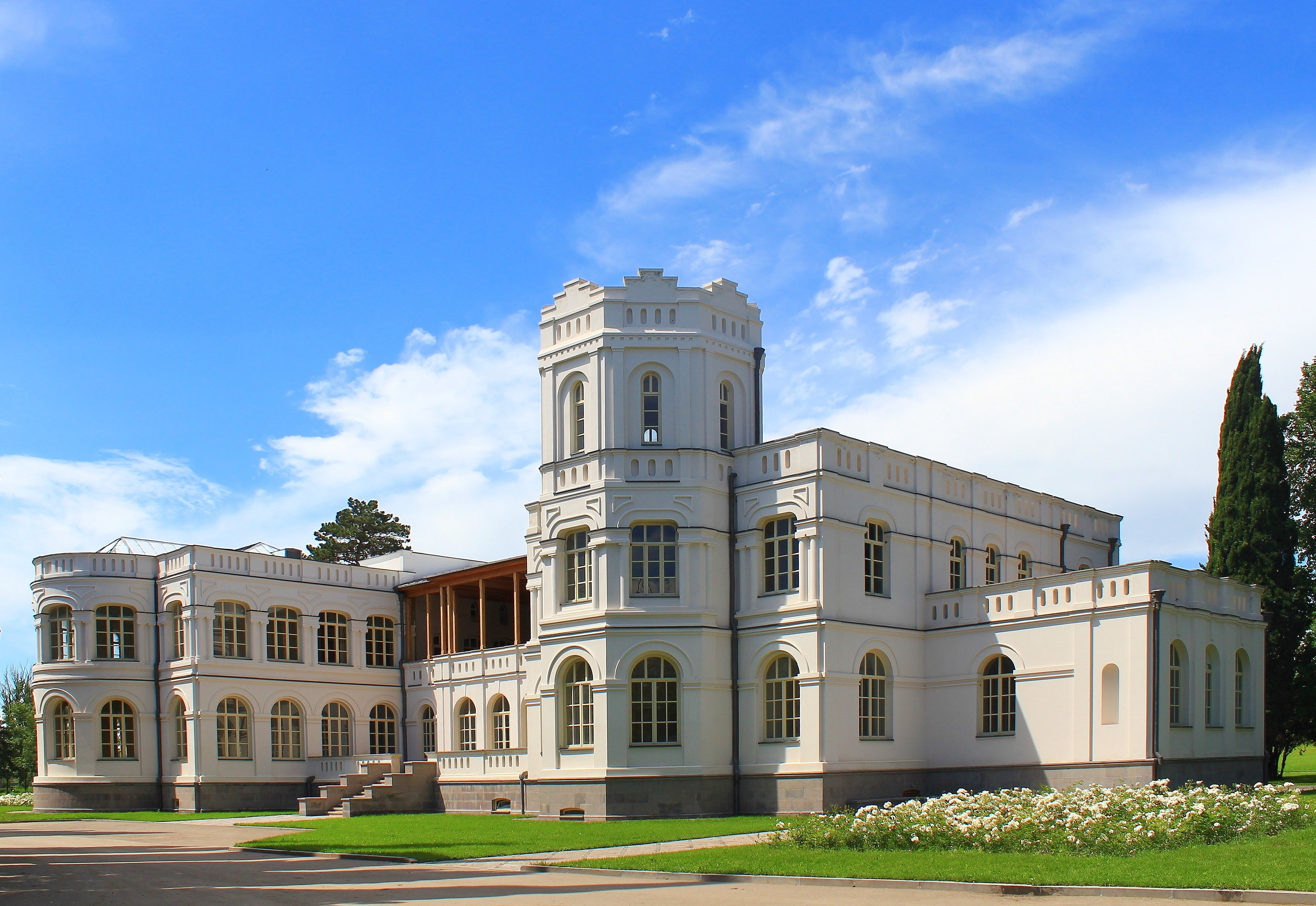
Palace of Mukhrani

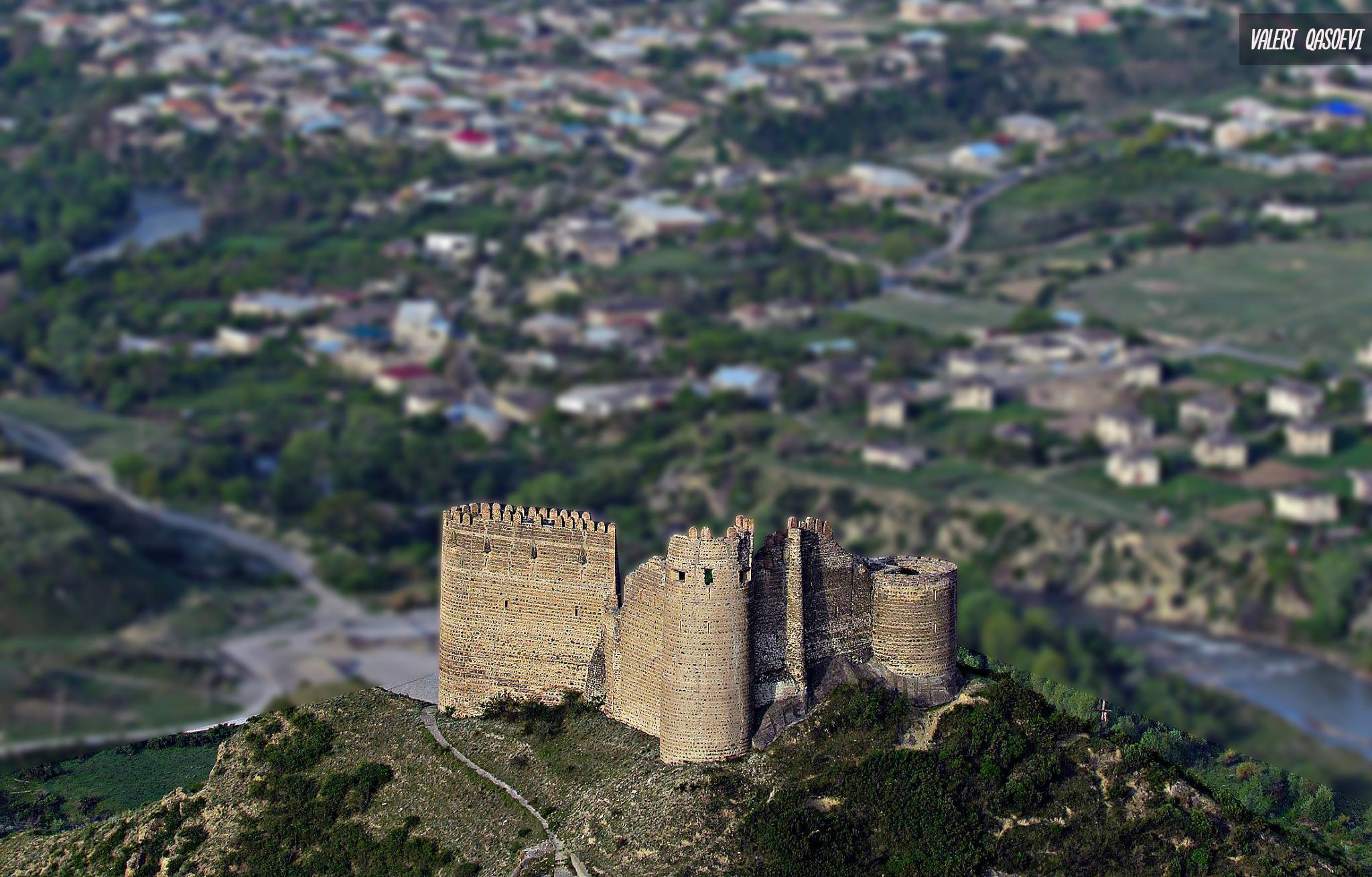
Ksani fortress

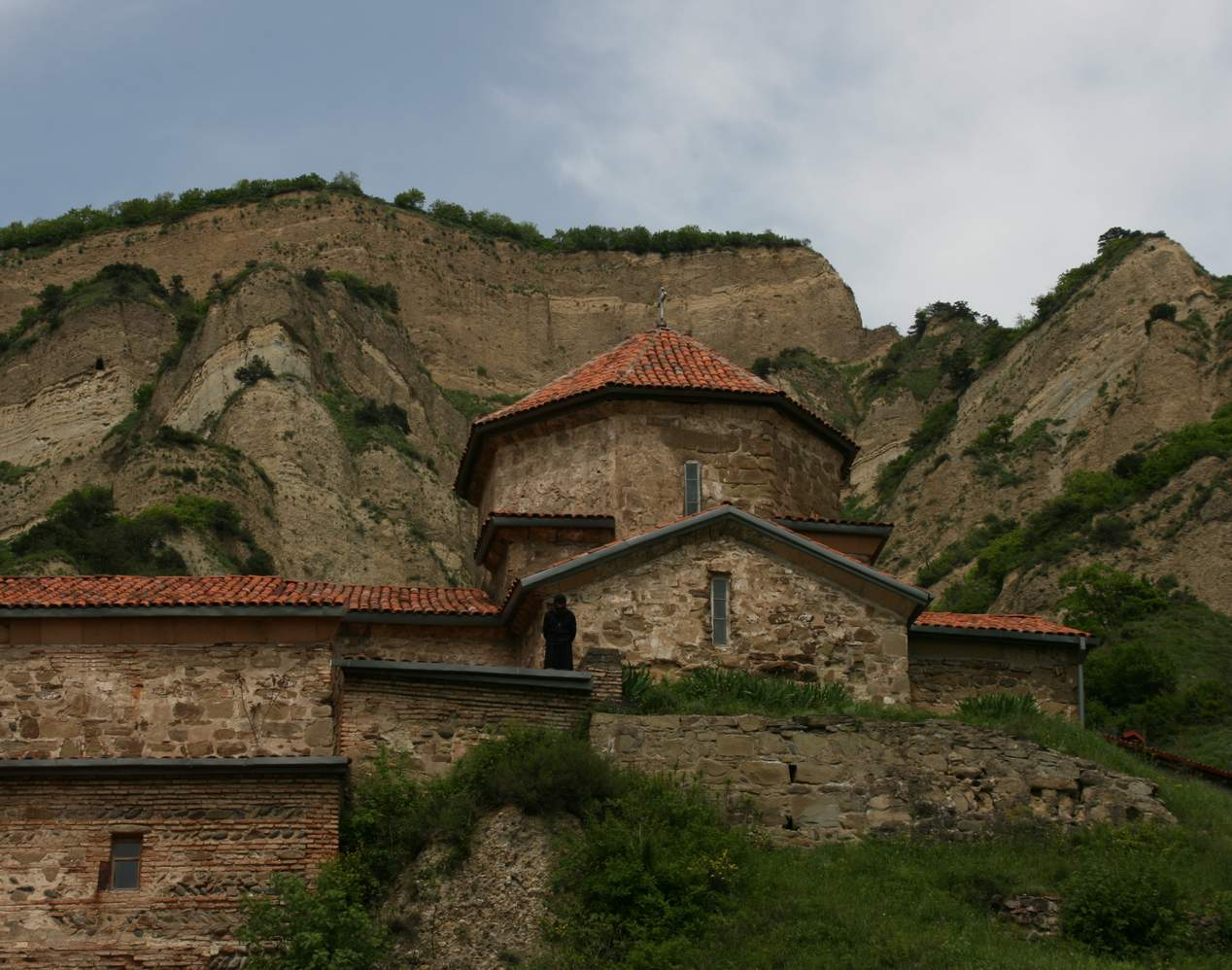
Saint John the Baptist chapel in Shiomghvime Monastery

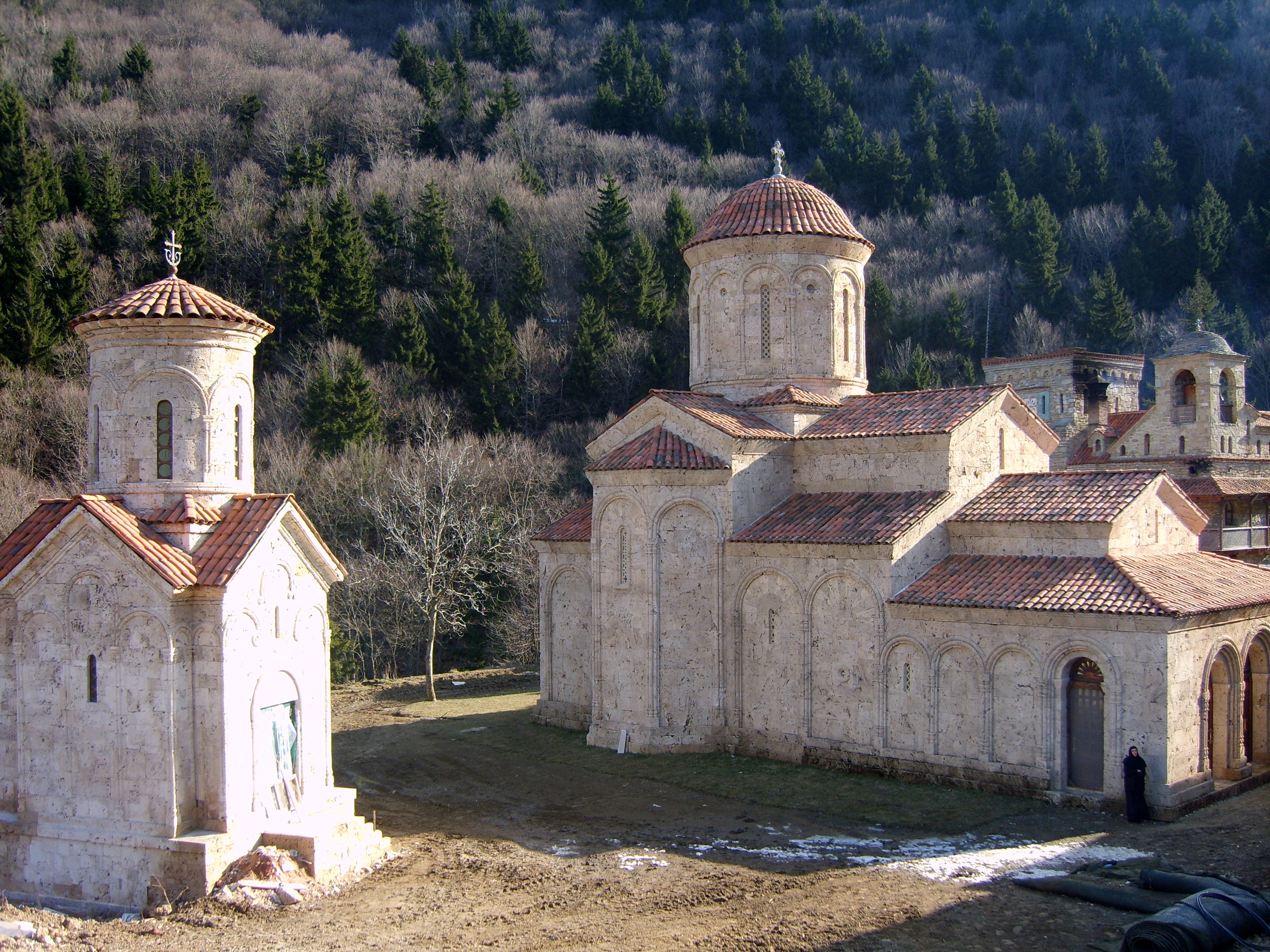
Church of Bevreti

- Svetitskhoveli
- Jvari Monastery
- Samtavro Monastery
- Ksani fortress
- Armazi Settlement
- Shio-mghvime Monastery Complex
- Pompey bridge
- Armazi St.Mary's Church
- Armazistsikhe-Bagineti

== Demography ==
Year	Population
1989	63,123
2002	65,248
2014	47,711
2018	53,900

== Villages of Mtskheta Municipality ==
- Arashenda,
- Agdgomliantkari,
- Akhaldaba,
- Akhali Nichbisi,
- Akhalsopeli,
- Akhalubani,
- Bevreti,
- Bitsmendi,
- Buriani,
- Galavani,
- Gorovani,
- Ereda,
- Vaziani,
- Vardisubani,
- Zakaro,
- Zemo Nichbisi,
- Tezami,
- Karsanobi,
- Lelubani,
- Lisi,
- Mamkoda,
- Misaktsieli,
- Mskhaldidi,
- Mukhatgverdi,
- Mukhattskaro,
- Mukhrani,
- Mshralkhevi,
- Navdaraantkari,
- Navazi,
- Natakhtari,
- Patara Kanda,
- Saguramo,
- Satovle,
- Saskhori,
- Skhaltba,
- Tabaruki,
- Kupurisi,
- Kvebrisi,
- Krevisri,
- Shankevani,
- Chardakhi,
- Tsikhisdziri,
- Tskhvarichamia,
- Dzalantkhevi,
- Dzalisi,
- Dzegvi,
- Old Kanda,
- Tserovani,
- Tsilkani,
- Tsinamdzgviantkari,
- Tsitsamuri,
- Tsodoreti,
- Chilaantkari,
- Khekordzi,
- Jighaura

== Twin towns – sister Municipalities ==
- Fındıklı, Turkey
- Irpin, Ukraine
- Kuldīga, Latvia
- Leuville-sur-Orge, France
- Myrhorod, Ukraine
- Nesebar, Bulgaria
- Pereiaslav, Ukraine
- Ružinov (Bratislava), Slovakia
- Svietlahorsk, Belarus
- Trakai, Lithuania
- Ünye, Turkey
- Vagharshapat, Armenia

== See also ==
- List of municipalities in Georgia (country)
