= Bagration-Davitishvili =

Georgian noble family

Bagration-Davitishvili ბაგრატიონ-დავითიშვილები
- Parent family: Bagrationi dynasty
- Country: Kingdom of Kartli, Kingdom of Imereti, Kingdom of Kartli-Kakheti
- Current region: Shida Kartli, Sadavitishvilo's principality.
- Earlier spellings: Bagrationi, Tvaldamtsvrishvili, Davitishvili
- Origin: Kingdom of Kakheti
- Founded: 1511
- Founder: Demetre Bagrationi (1472 – ca. 1513), crown prince of Kakheti
- Final ruler: Zaal Davitishvili (1744-1801)
- Seat: Dirbi, Broti, Sative, Bebnisi, Nuli, Abano, Ptsa, Tormaneuli, Tmihzrevi, Brotstleti, Stkotsa, Glibrevi, Gvereti, Bani, Tsablovana, Tihrevi
- Titles: Tavadi
- Connected families: Bagration-Davydov
- Cadet branches: Ramazishvili

The House of Bagration-Davitishvili (Georgian: ბაგრატიონ-დავითიშვილი) is a Georgian noble family, a cadet branch of the Kakhetian line of the royal Bagration dynasty. The Kakhetian line descends from George VIII, last king of the united Georgian kingdom and first king of Kakheti.

In historical sources, this branch first appears under the names Tvaldamtsvrishvili or Tvaldamtsvriani (Georgian: თვალდამწვრიშვილები, თვალდამწვრიანები), literally meaning "descendants of the one whose eyes were burned out". Over time, the surname Davitishvili—derived from the name of Prince Davit, son of the branch's founder, Kakhetian Crown Prince Demetre—replaced the earlier family epithets. In the Russian tradition, this was adapted as Davydov, leading to the formal compound surname Bagration-Davydov. Some modern descendants use the simplified form—Bagration.

An early 19th-century source by Prince Ioane Bagrationi (son of King George XII of Kartli-Kakheti) explicitly states: "The Davitishvili are of the Bagrationi family, who now live in Tskhinvali, specifically in the Nuli Valley, and are divided into two houses: 1) the children of Zaal, and 2) the children of Elizbar. The others, of lower rank (aznauri) from the same family, living in Ptsa, are: Shanshe with his children and others, apparently the children of Leon".

According to the conclusion of the Russian genealogist S. V. Dumin (Heraldry Master of the Chancellery of the Head of the Russian Imperial House), the male-line descendants of King George II of Kakheti (the branch to which the Serene Princes Gruzinsky belonged) were represented only by daughters by the end of the 20th century (1998). Consequently, in the foreseeable future, the seniority within the Bagrationi royal house is expected to pass to the descendants of the brother whom he blinded — Prince Demetre (1472–1513), whose progeny later became known as the Princes Bagration-Davitishvili. The Chancellery of the Georgian Royal House (which represented the interests of the descendants of George XII, later known as the Serene Princes Gruzinsky in the Russian Empire), in its 2010 statement (Appendix No. 4), defines seniority within the dynasty through descent from King George VIII (1446–1466), the last ruler of a unified Georgia before its collapse. Since neither the Kartlian nor the Imeretian branches descend from George VIII, and the direct male line of his descendants (the Bagration-Gruzinsky) effectively became extinct in 2025, dynastic seniority passes to the male line of his brother — Demetre, i.e., to the Bagration-Davitishvili line. Thus, from the perspective of agnatic primogeniture, the Davitishvili represent not a princely, but a royal line, which retains the rights of seniority within the House of Bagrationi. This line also remains the most numerous branch of the Bagrationi dynasty, with the most extensive male descent capable of perpetuating the lineage.

== History ==
George VIII was succeeded by his son, King Alexander I of Kakheti (1476–1511). According to the historian Vakhushti Bagrationi, Alexander was a capable ruler who maintained peace on his borders. However, a dynastic conflict arose between his two sons: the elder, George (the future George II of Kakheti), described as envious and power-hungry, and the younger, Prince Demetre (born 1472), who enjoyed their father's trust. In 1501, Alexander entrusted Demetre with a diplomatic mission to Shah Ismail I of Persia. The prince succeeded in securing the exemption of Kakheti from tribute. This success deepened the elder brother's resentment. In 1511, George staged a coup: he murdered his father and ordered Demetre blinded. The usurper received the epithet "Av-Giorgi" (George the Mad). The blinded Demetre — thereafter known as Tvaldamtsvari ("he whose eyes were burned out") — fled with his family, including his son Davit, to the Safavid court. Shah Ismail I, who remembered Demetre favourably, recognised David as the rightful king of Kakheti, thereby delegitimising George. With the shah's support, the family settled in the Kingdom of Kartli, acquiring lands and building alliances with local nobles. After the shah's death, King Levan of Kakheti (son of the usurper George) moved against the family. With the cooperation of King Luarsab I of Kartli, the Davitishvili fortress at Dirbi was destroyed, and Davit was expelled. His son Ramaz resisted successfully with help from the Prince of Mukhrani but was ultimately forced into exile. Ramaz and his father found refuge at the court of Bagrat III of Imereti (1510–1565). The king gave Ramaz his daughter in marriage and granted him estates in Upper Kartli. These lands — centred on the village of Nuli — became the hereditary appanage principality of Sadavitishvilo.

Ramaz's son, Prince David II Tvaldamtsvrishvili (a grandson of Bagrat III through his mother), built a career at the Kartlian court. In 1608, King Luarsab II appointed him to the high office of bokaultukhutsesi. Under King Rostom, David II held the posts of eshikagasbashi and mdivanbeg. After David II's death in 1635, his son Elizbar succeeded him, holding the post of bokaultukhutsesi for three decades. He played key roles in suppressing a revolt (1639), conducting a diplomatic mission to Safavid Persia, and fighting at the Battle of Magaro (1648). The marriage of Prince Elizbar Davitishvili to Princess Tinatin of Mukhrani (daughter of Kaikhosro Mukhranbatoni) strengthened the family's strategic alliance. Their granddaughter, Tamar I Davitishvili, became queen of Kartli through her marriage to Prince George of Kartli — the future King George XI. Thus, the house intermarried directly with the reigning Kartlian branch of the Bagrations. Tamar was buried in the Svetitskhoveli Cathedral (1684), whereas other members of this family were buried primarily within the territory of the Ruisi-Urbnisi Eparchy.

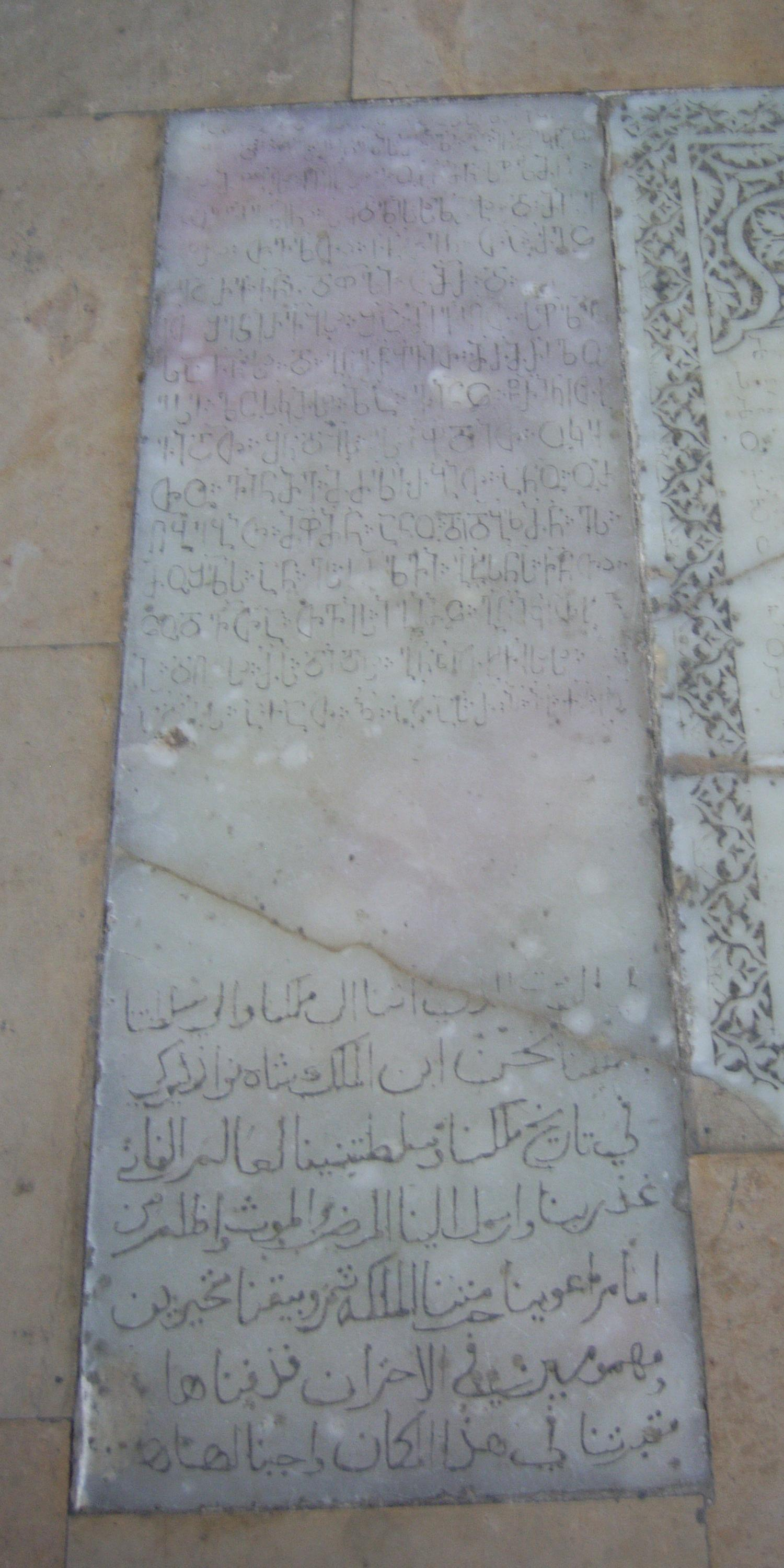
Inscription on the tombstone of Queen Tamar Davitishvili (died 1684), wife of King George XI of Kartli, at Svetitskhoveli. Translation: "I, Giorgi, son of King Shahnavaz, in the fifth year of our reign, the lawless world sent a deadly plague and took from us Queen Tamar. We buried her in our tomb and covered it with marble. Whoever reads this, pray for us. If anyone destroys or opens this tomb, may he be judged for our sins on the Day of Judgment. Year 7192 (AD 1684). The inscription mentions the 1684 plague (smallpox/measles) in Kartli.

The youth of George Davitishvili (c. 1709–1782) was overshadowed by the Ottoman invasion of 1723–1724, during which ancestral lands were devastated. After King Vakhtang VI departed for Russia, tavadi Givi Amilakhvari (1689–1754) seized part of the Sadavitishvilo estates, initiating a long conflict. George took part in the Kartlian uprising of 1742–1745 against Nader Shah. His son and heir, Prince Zaal Davitishvili (1744–1801), participated in the disastrous Battle of Krtsanisi (1795) against Agha Mohammad Khan Qajar. A court case in 1797 over ancestral lands ended badly for Zaal: under the legal code of King Vakhtang VI, he was sentenced to have his right hand cut off for destroying boundary markers, and the disputed lands were awarded to the Amilakhvari family. Zaal died in 1801, the same year the Kingdom of Kartli-Kakheti was annexed by the Russian Empire. The Davitishvili appanage, which had lasted nearly three centuries, came to an end.

By imperial decrees of Nicholas I of Russia in 1849 and 1857, the family — under the Russified name Bagration-Davydov — was recognised in the princely dignity of the Russian Empire. Modern genetics confirm the family's direct male-line descent from the Bagrationi dynasty (haplogroup Q1b2b1b2b2-L939).

== Scholarly debate on the origins of the aznauri line ==
Studying the genealogy of this branch of the Bagrationi dynasty, researchers have not reached a consensus. While some scholars, such as Ioseb Bichikashvili, have argued that the noble (aznauri) Davitishvili family should be identified as Bagration-Davitishvili — a junior branch descending from Prince David, son of Elizbar Bagrationi — this view has been challenged by other genealogists. A detailed critique was offered by the Georgian genealogist Iuri Chikovani (1937–2018). Chikovani was the founder and chairman of the Georgian Genealogical Society, head of the Genealogical Research Center at the National Library of Parliament of Georgia, vice-chairman and chief genealogist of the Assembly of Nobility of Georgia, and from 2004 a member of the International Academy of Genealogy. Examining the sources cited by Bichikashvili (including "Antiquities of Georgia", "Monuments of Georgian Law", and the works of D. Ninidze), Chikovani concluded that none of them actually prove that a certain Iese Davitishvili was the son of Prince David Bagration-Davitishvili. Furthermore, he noted that Ninidze explicitly denies any genealogical link between the noble Davitishvili families and the princely Bagration-Davitishvili line. Chikovani also examined archival materials, including the 1820–1915 file "On the recognition of the noble dignity of the family of Ivan and Dimitri Davydov" (Central Historical Archive of Georgia, fund 213, inventory 1, file 1990). He found no evidence that any noble Davitishvili was recorded as a male-line descendant of the Bagration-Davitishvili princes. Based on this, he argued that the inclusion of 107 individuals in Table No. 16 of Bichikashvili's book "Bagrations – Genealogy of the Royal Dynasty of Georgia and Its Branches" as Bagration-Davitishvili lacks sufficient documentary foundation. Chikovani did not rule out the possibility that some noble Davitishvili families may indeed originate from the princely branch. However, he stressed that, based on the currently available written sources, this descent remains unproven.

Beginning with the work of the Georgian historian and genealogist David Ninidze—specifically his book Aka Ambavi Tvaldamtsvrianta (1999) and his monograph History of the Branches of the Royal House of Bagration (2004)—Georgian researchers have arrived at certain conclusions that have since become the subject of scholarly debate. Ninidze treats the surname Davitishvili as synonymous with Tvaldamtsvriani and connects this branch to the Kakhetian line of the Bagrationi dynasty, which descends from Prince Demetre (Dimitri), a son of Alexander I of Kakheti who was blinded in the sixteenth century. According to Ninidze, the descendants moved to Kartli, where one of them, named David, received a princely title and estates, and it is from his name that the surname Davitishvili originated. He further confirms that in the seventeenth and eighteenth centuries, representatives of this branch held high court positions under the Kartlian kings, such as the post of bokaultukhutsesi, and emphasizes that the Davitishvili and Tvaldamtsvriani are one and the same family, often appearing under the latter name in documents. Building on Ninidze’s framework, Ioseb Bichikashvili has elaborated on the aznauri (noble) line based on original documents. In his view, in the first half of the eighteenth century, an aznauri branch separated from the princely house of Bagration-Davitishvili, founded by Iese Davitishvili, the son of Prince David (son of Elizbar, 1605-1666). Bichikashvili cites several documentary sources. A deed of sale from February 1728, published by Ekvtime Takaishvili, records Prince David Davitishvili purchasing a vineyard and mentions his sons Iotam, Iese, and Christopher, with a clause transferring property to them and to all future members of his house. Another document from the early nineteenth century, found in the Monuments of Georgian Law, contains a petition mentioning Iese together with his son Glakha (Glakha Ieseevich), along with a resolution by a royal prince confirming Glakha’s status while noting royal patronage. The Treaty of Georgievsk of 1783 refers to the aznauri Davitishvili as royal nobility. Additionally, Ioane Bagrationi, in his Brief Description of Princely and Aznauri Families, explicitly notes that the aznauri Davitishvili were relatives of Prince Davitishvili and were received into the aznauri class by the kings, a fact reflected in the treaty. According to Bichikashvili, the subsequent fate of this branch is as follows. Glakha (son of Iese), who also bore the second name David in honor of his grandfather, appears in other documents. After the abolition of the Kingdom of Kartli-Kakheti in 1801, the aznauri Davitishvili were recognized as nobles of the Russian Empire and were often recorded under the Russified surnames Davydov or Davidov, as evidenced in the files on noble recognition held in the Central Historical Archive of Georgia. In the eighteenth and nineteenth centuries, their residences were located in the villages of Shindisi, Koshki, and Karbi, where they maintained ancestral churches, burial vaults, and defensive towers, including the so-called Davitishvili Tower in Karbi. The family split into two main branches, one in Karbi and the other in Koshki. In 2014, descendants officially reclaimed the historical surname Bagrationi by a decision of the Agency for the Development of State Services under the Ministry of Justice of Georgia. This interpretation has, however, met with criticism, particularly from the historian and genealogist Manana Khomeriki, author of The Bagrations: Irrefutable Evidence Against the Forgers of Documents and Impostors (Tbilisi, 2020). In the section dealing with the so-called noble branch (aznauri) of the Bagration-Davitishvili family, Khomeriki argues that the connection between the aznauri Davitishvili and the princely line (tavadi) remains unproven by strict archival standards. She points to the absence of direct evidence of continuous patrilineal descent—such as explicit statements like "son of Prince David" – in primary sources including parish registers, confession records, and the files on noble recognition held in the Central Historical Archive of Georgia, specifically the case file covering the years 1820 to 1915 concerning the recognition of noble status for the family of Ivan and Dmitry Davydov. In her view, even the sources cited by Bichikashvili, including the works of Ninidze, describe the existence of the aznauri Davitishvili and their possible kinship but do not provide sufficient direct proof of descent from specific princes of the Bagration-Davitishvili line through the male line. She regards the inclusion of numerous individuals in genealogical tables as artificial and unfounded, linking such constructions to a broader process of what she calls the "Bagrationization" of unsubstantiated families to expand the House of Bagrationi. Khomeriki relies in part on the analysis of Yuri Chikovani, chairman of the Georgian Genealogical Society, who examined the same sources and concluded that the origin of the aznauri from the princely line remains unproven, though not entirely excluded in individual cases. Thus, a scholarly divergence has emerged. Bichikashvili sees in the eighteenth- and nineteenth-century documents and in Ninidze’s work sufficient evidence of continuity, whereas Khomeriki demands more rigorous, direct archival proof of father-to-son lineage and considers the current arguments insufficiently substantiated. The dispute represents a classic genealogical debate over the criteria of evidence, pitting indirect references and traditional accounts against strict parish and confession records.

== See also ==
Bagration-Davitishvilis Tavadi branch

Alexander I (1454–1511); King of Kakheti; 1476–1511	Bagration-Davitishvili branch
George II (1469–1513); King of Kakheti; 1511–1513	King's younger brother Prince Demetrius (Demetre batonishvili) (b.1472-d.after 1513)
Levan (1504–1574); King of Kakheti; 1518–1574	David
United Kingdom of Kartli-Kakheti	Ramaz Davitishvili
Constantine (?–1590)	David (~†1635)
Ramazi (~†1634)	Elizbar (~1605-1666)
Kaikhosro ×	Khokhona (~†1666)	Elizbar (~†1666)	David (~1675-1725)
Resettled in Russia
Ivane	Mikheil	Elizbar (~1688-1738)
Boros	Mikheil (1749-1785)	Giorgi (~1709-1782)
Nikoloz	Elisabed ×	Anastasia ×	Zaal (~1744-1801)
Pavle ×	Nikoloz ×	Irine ×	Maria ×	Rostom (~1776-1806)
Solomon (1796-1859)	Giorgi (1809-1888)
Edisher (1823-1874)	Nikoloz (1848-?)	Ephrem
Bagrat (1857-1924)	Solomon (1862-1924)	Vasil (1864-1943)	Archil (1882-1958) ×	Constantine (1886-1949)	Aleksandre (1879-1947)
Giorgi (1900-1976)	David (1894-1924) ×	Shalva (1897-1956)	Dimitri (1900-1937)	Ilia (1902-1924)	Adam (1895-1948)	Irakli (Jano) (1909-1979)	Natalia (b.1922)	Nikoloz (1909-1981)
Constantine (b.1946)	Otar (1922-1997)	Givi (1927-2002)	Tinatin (b.1930)	Shota (b.1936)	Julia (b.1924)	Edisher (1928-2004)	Merab (1933-1992)	Jansug (b.1938)	Giorgi (b.1946)	Nodar (b.1937)	Nana (b.1939)	Neli (b.1946)
Irine (b.1970)	Giorgi (1977-1993) ×	Ala (b.1952)	Tsiala (b.1959)	Irine (b.1956)	Mukhran (b.1959)	Nino (b.1968)	Khatuna (b.1970)	Mamuka (b.1970)	Rusudan (b.1961)	Mariam (b.1962)	Tariel (b.1966)	Giorgi (b.1965)	Giorgi (b.1962)	Nino (b.1963)	Manana (b.1957)	Thamar (b.1965)	Nino (b.1968)	Ekaterine (b.1972)	Thamar (b.1971)	Elisabed (b.1974)	Nino (b.1968)	Natia (b.1971)
Giorgi (b.1981)	Teona (b.1986)	Lasha (b.1989)	Levan (b.1988)	Thamar (b.1990)	David (b.2003)	Giorgi (b.2002)	Nikoloz (b.1988)	Nato (b.1990)

== Sources ==
- Davydov-Bagrations // Brockhaus and Efron Encyclopedic Dictionary: in 86 volumes (82 vols. and 4 supplements). — St. Petersburg, 1890–1907.
- Lakier, A. B. § 94. Coats of arms of families originating from Georgia // Russian Heraldry. — 1855.
- Neporozhnev, N. Lists of titled clans and persons of the Russian Empire. Publication of the Heraldry Department of the Governing Senate. — St. Petersburg, 1892.
- Vakhushti Bagrationi. History of the Kingdom of Georgia. Life of Kakheti and Hereti (Part 1).
- Parsadan Gorgijanidze. History of Georgia: A Narrative of the Descendants of the Blinded One.
- Prince Ioann Bagrationi. "A Brief Description of the Families of Princes and Nobles Living in Georgia" (1799).
- Sekhnia Chkheidze. Life of the Kings.
- Noble Families of the Russian Empire. Volume 3. Princes / Edited by S. V. Dumin. — Moscow: Linkominvest, 1996.
- Toumanoff, Cyril. The Fifteenth-Century Bagratids and the Institution of Collegial Sovereignty in Georgia // Traditio. — 1949–51.
- Joseph Bichikashvili. Princes Bagration-Davitishvili // Bulletin of the National Academy of Sciences of Georgia. — 2023.
- Ayshin Ghalichi, Sabine Reinhold, et al. The rise and transformation of Bronze Age pastoralists in the Caucasus // Nature. — 2024.
