= Prince Demetrius of Kakheti =

Demetrius
- Died: After 1513
- Issue: Davit Tvaldamtsvriani
- Dynasty: Bagrationi
- Father: Alexander I of Kakheti
- Mother: Ana Cholokashvili
- Religion: Georgian Orthodox Church

Demetrius (Georgian: დემეტრე, romanized: demet're; died after 1513), known by the historical epithet Tvaldamtsvari (Georgian: თვალდამწვარი, romanized: tvaldamts'vari, meaning "with burnt-out eyes"), was a Georgian royal prince (batonishvili) of the Kakhetian branch of the Bagrationi dynasty. He was the younger son of King Alexander I of Kakheti and is known for being blinded by his elder brother, George II, during a coup in 1511. He is the progenitor of the princely house of Bagration-Davitishvili.

== Biography ==
=== Early life and diplomatic mission ===
The Administrative Divisions of Safavid Iran in the South Caucasus

Demetrius was the younger son of Alexander I of Kakheti. Contemporary chroniclers, such as Prince Vakhushti Bagrationi, describe Alexander as a peace-loving and capable ruler. According to historical accounts, a deep ideological rift developed within the royal family. The elder son and heir, George, was said to be cruel, reckless, and envious, constantly urging his father to break the peace with the neighboring Kingdom of Kartli and embark on aggressive campaigns. In contrast, the younger prince, Demetrius, inherited his father's character and views. He was a supporter of cautious diplomacy and peace, which he saw as essential for the prosperity of Kakheti, a kingdom weakened after the fragmentation of a unified Georgia. By the year 1500, the Georgian kingdoms and principalities were squeezed between two warlike empires: the Ottoman Empire in the west and the Safavid Empire in the east. The latter was headed by Shah Ismail I, who had transformed the Azerbaijani state into an all-Iranian empire. Georgia faced a choice: it could become either a vassal or an ally of the stronger power in order to fight the weaker of the two giants attempting to dominate the entire South Caucasus. Both the Ottoman army and bureaucracy and the Iranian forces—dominated by the Turkmen Qizilbash ("red heads")—were equally dangerous threats, as both empires possessed firearms.

Ismail (portrait) before the Battle of Sharur (1501). Habib al-siyar, end of 16th century

In the early 16th century, King Alexander I faced a critical foreign policy challenge: establishing relations with the new and powerful ruler of Safavid Persia, Shah Ismail I. In 1500, Ismail persuaded the atabag of Samtskhe, the Kartlian king Constantine II, and the Kakhetian king Alexander to join him in attacking Ottoman territory near Tabriz. To ascertain the sincerity of his new allies, Ismail asked the Kakhetian king Alexander to send his son Demetrius to Shirvan (1501), which had just been conquered, to negotiate peace. The king chose his younger son, Demetrius, as his envoy for this delicate mission. Batonishvili Demetrius succeeded in concluding peace with the Shirvan-shah. Shah Ismail received Demetrius with high honors and concluded an agreement with Kakheti that exempted the kingdom from paying tribute to the Safavids. This achievement contrasted sharply with the situation of the neighboring Kingdom of Kartli, which was forced to bear the heavy burden of annual tribute to the Persian shah. Demetrius's diplomatic triumph strengthened Kakheti's security and economy, but it also bred jealousy in his elder brother, George Batonishvili, who saw his younger brother's success as a threat to his own claim to the throne. Shah Ismail had a 7,000-strong army, to which each Georgian ruler sent a reinforcement of 3,000 men, so that by 1503 the coalition was able to recapture Nakhchivan from the Ottomans. Ismail did not keep his promise and declared Kartli and Kakheti his vassals.

=== Blinding and exile ===
In 1511, Prince George, having harbored resentment over his brother's success and suspecting his father intended to pass the throne to Demetrius, exploited an opportunity to commit patricide. He murdered his father, Alexander I, and seized power. Immediately after the coup, George had his brother Demetrius captured and blinded. The act of blinding was meant to permanently disqualify Demetrius from ever claiming the throne, as a ruler in medieval Georgia had to be physically unimpaired. According to Donald Rayfield's account, George, disregarding his father's fury, led an army into Kartli. He then killed his enraged father, gouged out his brother Demetrius's eyes, and proclaimed himself George II, "King of Imereti, Abkhazeti, Armenia, Kartli, and Kakheti." In this version, Demetrius died, while his widow and children fled to Kartli. This contrasts with other sources that describe Demetrius surviving his blinding and going into exile.

However, some sources suggest that Demetrius did not lose his sight immediately. The chronicler Parsadan Gorgijanidze writes that, following his capture, Demetrius's sight was restored enough for him to shoot a dove from a tree with a bow. When his enemies learned of this, they ordered a physician to apply treatments that would completely and permanently destroy his vision.

Following his blinding, Demetrius fled Kakheti with his family. He sought refuge at the court of Shah Ismail I in Persia, the same ruler with whom he had successfully negotiated several years earlier. The Shah welcomed the blinded prince. According to Gorgijanidze, to prove their loyalty, Demetrius's son, David, was ordered to fight a duel against one of the Shah's warriors. Following his father's instructions, David won the duel, defeating and beheading his opponent. The Shah was so impressed by this feat that he officially granted the Kingdom of Kakheti to David, recognising the rights of Demetrius's line to the throne, and had his shield filled with silver coins as a reward.

== Settlement in Kartli and legacy ==
Despite the Shah's promise, returning to Kakheti was too dangerous. George II had consolidated his power and was succeeded by his young son, Levan, in 1513. Following the Shah's advice to "live in Kartli until you take back Kakheti," Demetre and his family arrived in the Kingdom of Kartli. With the silver he had received from the Shah, Demetre purchased several villages in Kartli: Dirbi, Breti, and Bebnisi. With the help of local princes, he built a strong fortress at Dirbi, where he established himself and his descendants.

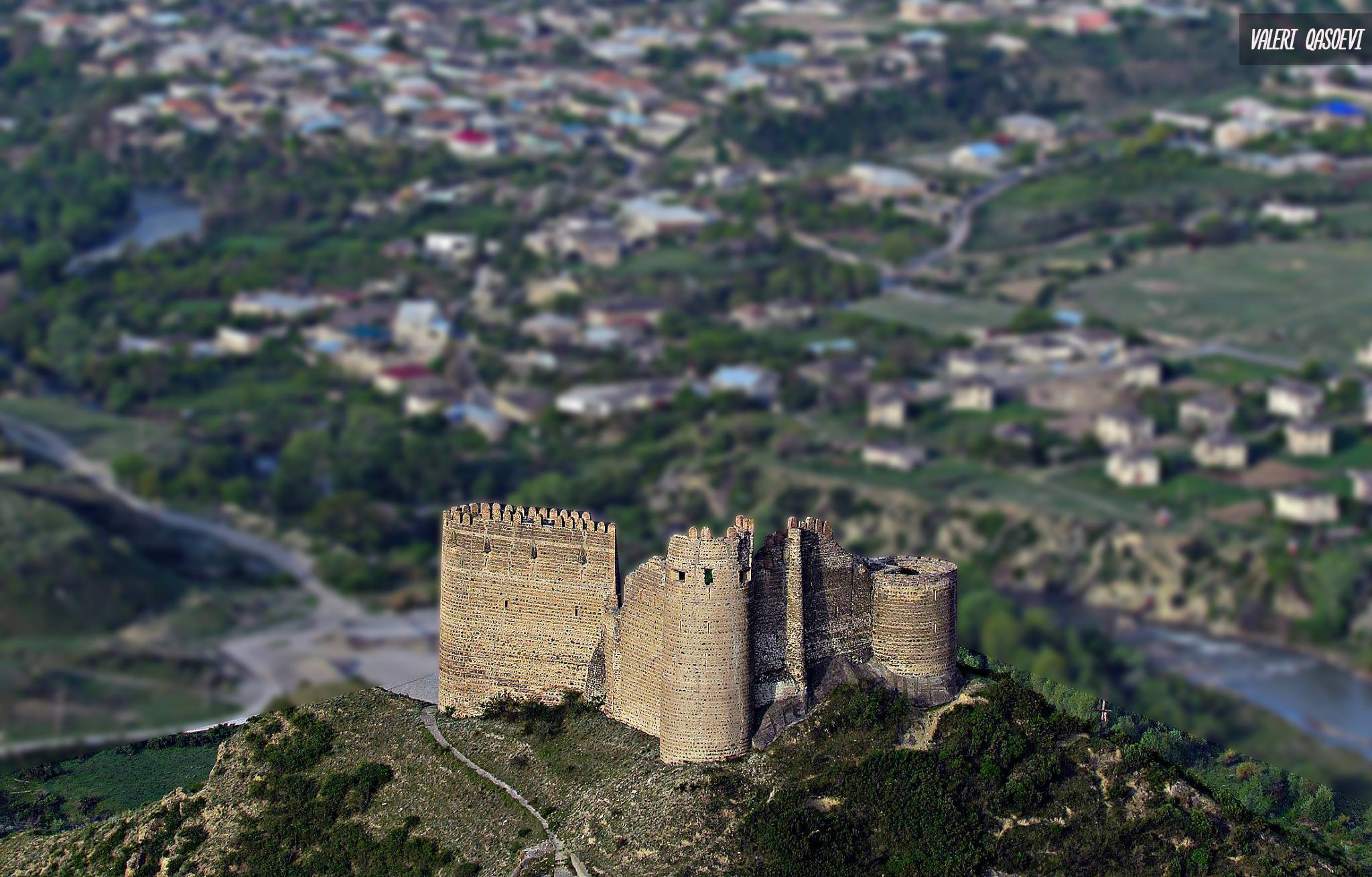
Ksani fortress

Meanwhile, in Kartli, while George II plundered the country and pursued King David X, the latter hid from him in the fortress of Ateni. Bagrat, David's younger brother, lost patience and forcibly took command of the army in Inner Kartli: Bagrat proclaimed himself Mukhran-batoni (lord of Mukhrani) and took possession of the Aragvi and Ksani valleys, founding a principality and a new branch of the Bagrations seventy kilometers west of Tbilisi. In 1513, Bagrat Mukhranbatoni withstood a three-month siege by Wicked George in his impregnable Ksani fortress. Toward the end of the siege, Wicked George sent Bagrat a large amphora of wine with a mocking note: "It is not fitting for a prince to live without wine"; Bagrat in response sent the enemy a live salmon from his pond. Wicked George realized that with such supplies Bagrat would not surrender for a long time, lifted the siege, and began ravaging the outskirts. To this day the Ksani fortress is known by its indecent. In the summer, Bagrat waylaid Wicked George, who, heading home with his loot, decided to go hunting. Wicked George was seized and killed.

Prince Demetrius is the founder of the princely house of Bagration-Davitishvili (also known as Bagration-Davydov in Russia). This noble family, a cadet branch of the royal Bagrationi dynasty, continued to play a notable role in the political and military life of Georgia for centuries. Demetrius's descendants married into other branches of the Bagrationi family and prominent Georgian noble houses. They maintained the tradition of their royal descent and served in the Kingdom of Kartli. While Demetrius's line, the Bagration-Davitishvili, flourished as a respected princely family, the throne of Kakheti remained in the hands of the descendants of his brother, George II. In Georgian historiography, the line of George II was sometimes viewed unfavorably. The historian Dimitri Bakradze, for example, noted that the family of George II, later including King Alexander II of Kakheti, was considered a "house upon which the curse of God lay," known for "vile atrocities." In contrast, Demetrius's line, despite his personal tragedy, retained the status and reputation of a respected princely house.

== See also ==
- Bagration-Davitishvili

== Sources ==
- Бакрадзе, Д.З // Сванетия // Записки Кавказского отдела Императорского русского исторического общества, Книга VI. 1864.;
- გუჩუა ვ., ქართული საბჭოთა ენციკლოპედია, ტ. 3, თბ., 1978. — გვ. 553.
- Вахушти Багратиони. «История Царства Грузинского. Жизнь Кахети и Эрети (часть 1)».
- «Жалованная грамота царя Луарсаба бокаултухуцесу Давиду Давитишвили (1608 г.)».
- Christopher Buyers, The Royal Ark: «Грузия (Bagrationi Dynasty) — Tval-Damtsvirishvili, Davitishvili, Bagration».
- Парсадан Горгиджанидзе. «История Грузии. Повествование о потомках ослепленного. Главы 94–108».
- «Дворянские роды Российской империи». Том 3, Станислав Думин.
- Рейфилд, Дональд. «Грузия. Перекресток империй. История длиной в три тысячи лет». Глава 12: «Братоубийство».
