= Saskhori =

Saskhori სასხორი
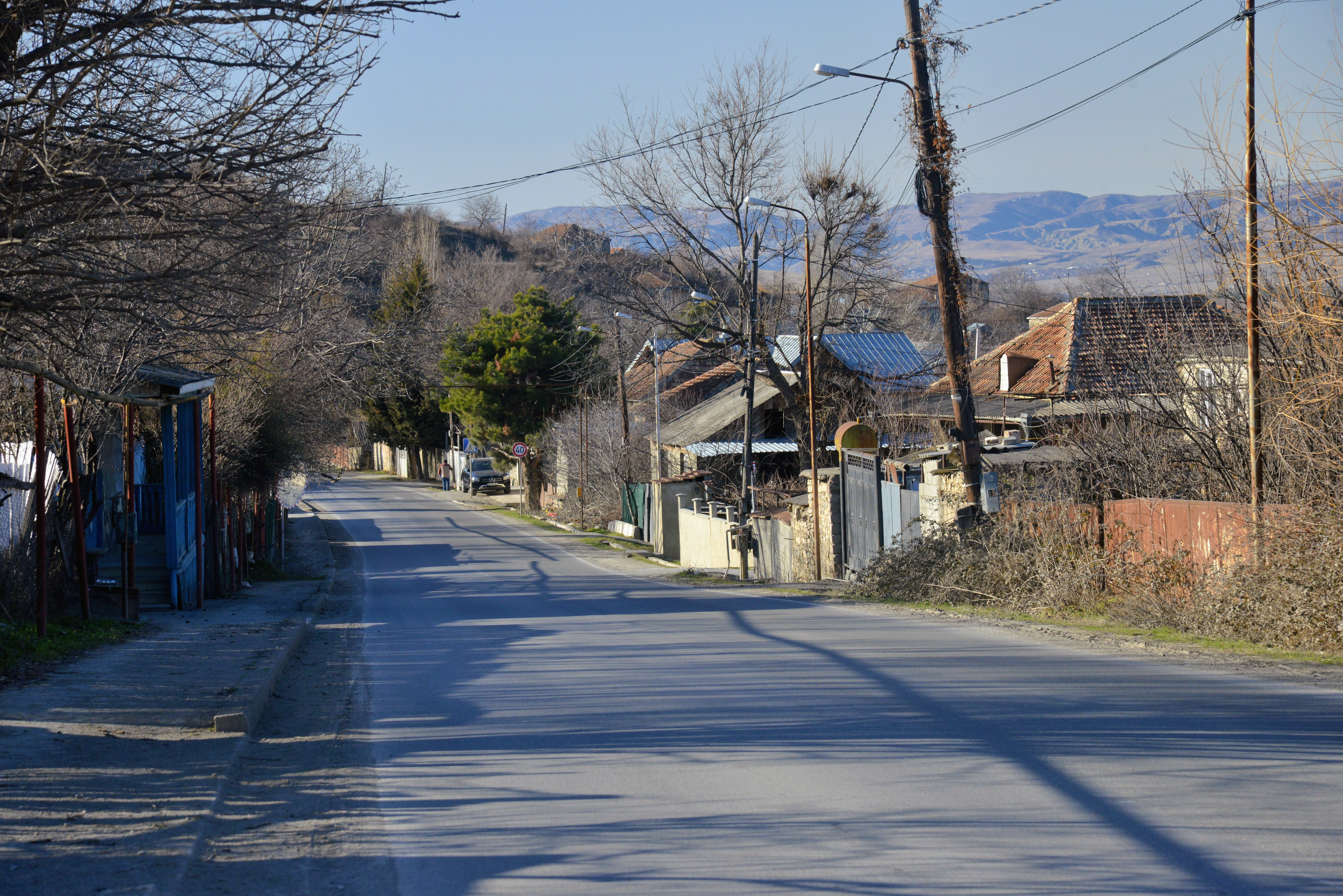
- Main street through Saskhori

- Location in Georgia
- Country: Georgia
- Traditional region: Ertso-Tianeti
- Municipality: Mtskheta
- Elevation: 590 m (1,940 ft)

Population (2014)
  - Total: 332
  - Ethnicities: Georgian 99.1%
  - Religions: Orthodox church
- Time zone: UTC+4 (Georgian Time)

Saskhori is a small settlement in Nichbisistskali Gorge in Municipality of Mtskheta in Georgia. The area is part of the traditional region of Ertso-Tianeti.

== History ==
Saskhori is mentioned in 1441 in the deed "Deed on the sacrifice of Saskhori of King Alexander to Svetitskhoveli". Village is also mentioned in the document of 1467 I.21. - The Book of Mercy of the land to Daniel Eliozisdze from King Bagrat". Saskhori is mentioned as a village in the description of Ioane Bagrationi in 1794–1799. According to the Iveria newspaper of May 18, 1886, Ilia, Niko, and Luarsab Merab Gedevanovs (Gedevanishvilis) were pledged to the Tbilisi Noble-Local Bank in the Tbilisi Province and Gori Mazra; Land sold by the bank for non-payment of taxes.

== Population ==
In 2014, the population was 332.

Year	Population
1907	363
2002	351
2014	332

The village is mainly inhabited by surnames: Gochiashvili, Iremashvili, Kituashvili, Lomouri, Kavtiashvili, Kvarkhishvili, Merebashvili, Papiashvili, Khizanishvili, Kartvelishvili, Shavshishvili, Khizanashvili, Javakhishvili and Jalabadze.

== Historical places ==
Three historic churches are found in Saskhori: Church of Mary, mother of Jesus, Church of St. George and Church of Archangel. An old castle was used in wars for defense.
