= George II of Kakheti =

George II

King of Kakheti
- Reign: 1511–1513
- Predecessor: Alexander I
- Successor: Interregnum (Note: Upon the death of George II, the kingdom was briefly annexed by the neighboring Kingdom of Kartli. When Kakheti regained its independence in 1518, the throne was succeeded by his son, Levan.)
- Died: 1513
- Spouse: Helen Cholokashvili
- Issue: Levan of Kakheti; Princess Khvaramze; Princess Mariam
- Dynasty: Bagrationi
- Father: Alexander I of Kakheti
- Mother: Ana Cholokashvili
- Religion: Georgian Orthodox Church

George II (Georgian: გიორგი II, romanized: giorgi II) also known as George the Bad (Note: Or the Mad, the Evil) (Georgian: ავგიორგი, romanized: avgiorgi; died 1513), of the Bagrationi dynasty, was a king (mepe) of the Kingdom of Kakheti from 1511 to 1513.

== Biography ==
He was the eldest son of King Alexander I of Kakheti by his wife, Queen Ana Cholokashvili. Prince George had conflicts with his father and younger brother, Demetrius, whom he regarded as a rival. Unlike his father and brother, he opposed peaceful relations with the neighboring Kingdom of Kartli and launched several military campaigns against it.

On April 27, 1511, George killed his father, Alexander I, and blinded his brother, Demetrius, subsequently expelling Demetrius and his family from Kakheti. He then seized the throne, and these actions earned him the epithet Evil George (Av-Giorgi), by which he is remembered in Georgian history.

Following his accession, in the same year, King George II launched a campaign against Kartli. Despite lacking sufficient forces to capture the Kartlian stronghold at Ateni (south of Gori), George conducted extensive raids in the surrounding regions.

On one occasion, however, he is recorded as having shown remorse. Chronicles from Mtskheta note that he received Communion from Catholicos Dionise, Archbishop Malakia, and Father Ioane of Alaverdi. As an act of atonement “for my sinful deed,” he granted the Catholicos two villages and exempted them from taxation. Despite this gesture, the conflict did not end with the earlier campaigns.

Bagrat, Prince of Mukhrani, soon launched an offensive against King George II and built the Fortress of Ksani at the confluence of the Ksani and Mtkvari rivers. George II attempted to besiege the fortress but, after three months of fighting, was forced to withdraw in defeat.

Later in 1513, George II invaded Kartli once more, ravaging the region of Mukhrani and plundering nearby villages. He was defeated by Bagrat’s reinforced army at Dzali, near Mtskheta. Captured and imprisoned in Ksani fortress, George II died later that year, likely assassinated on Bagrat’s orders. Kakheti was briefly annexed to Kartli.

== Family ==
George was married to Helen (fl. 1512–1532), a relative of Garsevan Cholokashvili. They had three children:

- Levan of Kakheti (1504–1574), King of Kakheti (r. 1518–1574);
- Princess Khvaramze (died 1528), who married Prince Vakhtang, son of Alexander II of Imereti;
- Princess Mariam (died 1555).

== Bibliography ==
- Toumanoff, Cyril (1976). Manuel de Généalogie et de Chronologie pour l'histoire de la Caucasie chrétienne (Arménie, Géorgie, Albanie) [Manual of Genealogy and Chronology of Christian Caucasian History (Armenia, Georgia, Albania)] (in French). Rome: Edizioni Aquila.

Preceded by Alexander I	King of Kakheti; 1511–1513	Succeeded by Kakheti annexed by David X
