= Ksani fortress =

Ksani Fortress
- ქსნის ციხე
- Village of Tsikhisdziri, Mtskheta Municipality; Mtskheta-Mtianeti in Georgia
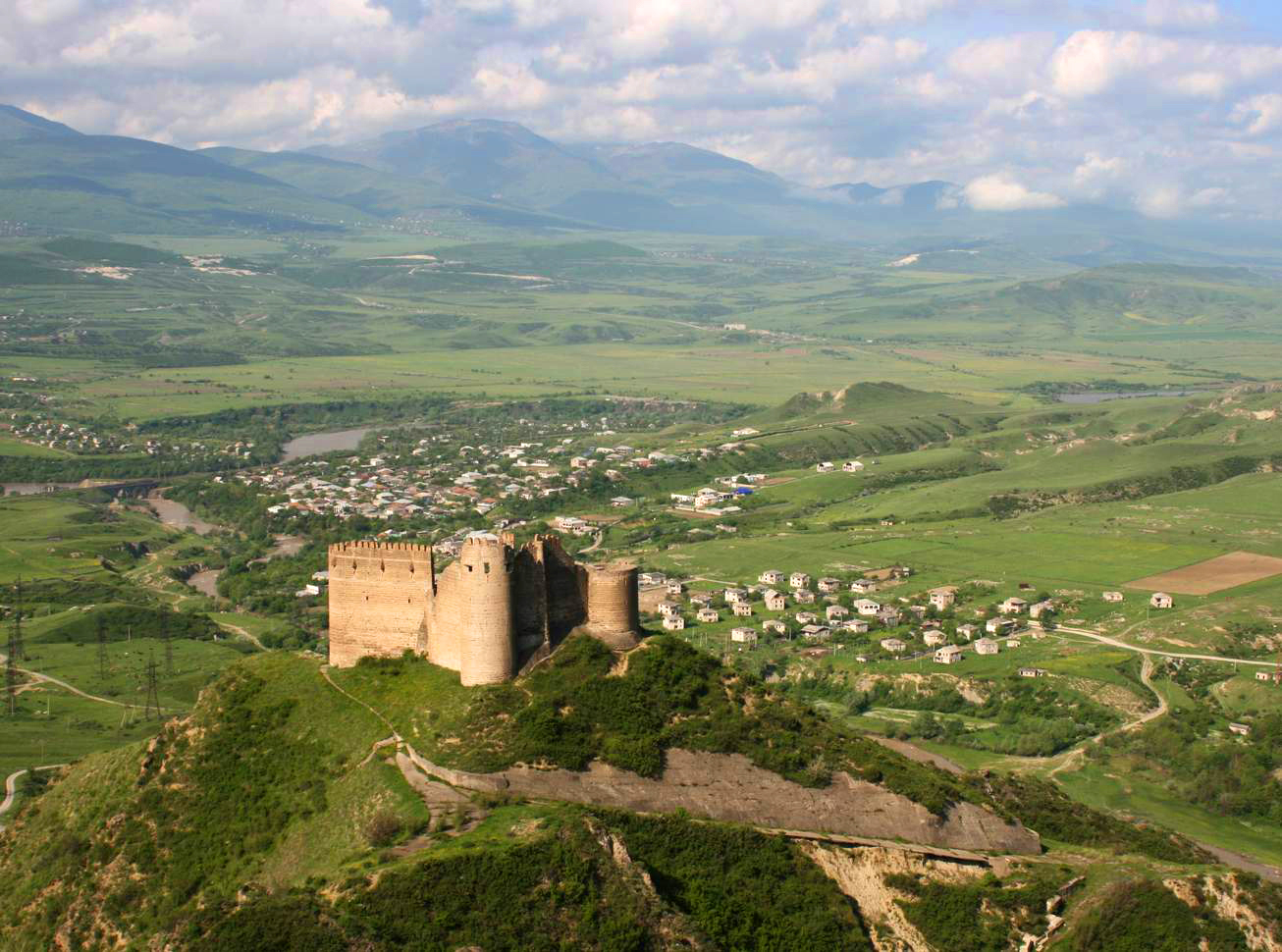
- Ksani fortress

Site information
- Condition: Ruined

Location
- Location within Mtskheta-Mtianeti Location within Georgia
- Coordinates: 41.875847°N 44.578026°E

Site history
- Built: 1514

Immovable Cultural Monument of National Significance of Georgia
- Official name: Ksani Fortress
- Designated: March 30, 2006; 20 years ago
- Reference no.: 2530
- Item Number in Cultural Heritage Portal: 5075;
- Date of entry in the registry: October 3, 2007; 18 years ago

The Ksani fortress (Georgian: ქსნის ციხე, romanized: ksnis tsikhe), also known as the Mtkvari fortress (მტკვრის ციხე, mt'k'vris tsikhe), is a fortress in eastern Georgia, strategically perched on a mount overlooking the confluence of the Ksani river with the Mtkvari (Kura) in the historical district of Mukhrani, now part of the Mtskheta Municipality. It was built by Bagrat, Prince of Mukhrani, in 1512 and reconstructed by his descendant in 1746. The fortress is inscribed on the list of Georgia's Immovable Cultural Monuments of National Significance.

== Location and layout ==
The Ksani fortress tops a 600-meter-high Mount Sarkineti on the left bank of the Ksani in the vicinity of the village of Tsikhisdziri, Mtskheta Municipality, in the Mtskheta-Mtianeti region. The fortress is strategically located, overlooking the confluence of the Ksani and Mtkvari. Accessible only from the southwest, it offers a view of both river valleys, and due to its commanding position, is visible from Georgia's main east–west highway.

The fortress is perceived as the mountain continuation. Two construction layers can be distinguished in the fortress, the original from 16th century and the reconstruction of 18th century. The latter event is documented by an inscription above the tower door. The extant fortress is irregular polygonal in plan. The original building is built of cobble stone. It had towers only at the northern corners. Mixed stone and brick lines are the result of the 18th-century reconstruction, when three multilevel towers were added. The walls are fortified with bastions and towers of different size and shape and crowned with crenellated parapets. They are equipped with embrasures and roundels. The towers also served as accommodation. The southeastern tower basement had large water reservoir. In the courtyard there are also a pond and a wine-cellar. Water used to be supplied by an aqueduct which continued along the mountain ridge for several kilometres.

== History ==
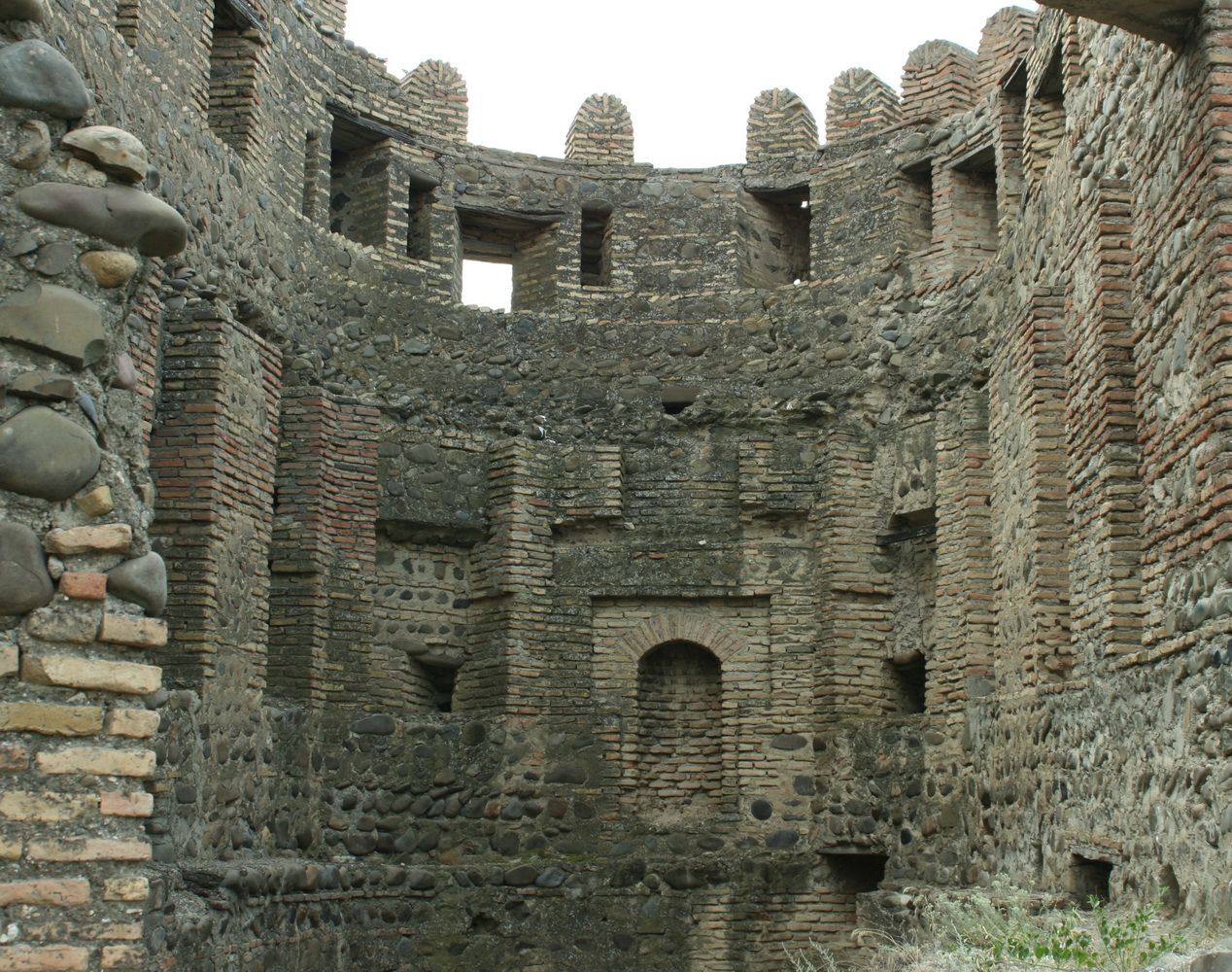
Inner walls.

The fortress is known from early modern historical records under the name of Mtkvari (archaically, Mtkuri) or Mtveri, but it is popularly and commonly known as Ksani. It was built by Prince Bagrat, who scrounged from his elder brother, King David X of Kartli, the district of Mukhrani and carved himself out a principality. The fortress immediately became a target of the neighboring Georgian ruler George II of Kakheti, who laid a siege to Ksani. According to one account, after a three-month-long standoff, George mockingly sent fresh wine to Bagrat, thinking the defenders were starving. When, in return, he received a live salmon from the castle pond, George concluded that the siege was futile and withdrew. The conflict endured and in 1513 Bagrat succeeded in seizing George and making him prisoner at the Ksani fortress. The fortress remained in possession of the house of Mukhrani, founded by Bagrat, but gradually fell to ruin. In 1746, Constantine III, Prince of Mukhrani, rebuilt it and placed a commemorative inscription above the gate.
