= Alexander I of Kakheti =

Alexander I

King of Kakheti
- Reign: 1476–1511
- Predecessor: George I
- Successor: George II
- Born: 1454/56
- Died: 27 April 1511
- Spouse: Ana Cholokashvili; Tinatin
- Issue: George II of Kakheti; Prince Demetrius
- Dynasty: Bagrationi
- Father: George VIII
- Mother: Nestan-Darejan
- Religion: Georgian Orthodox Church

Alexander I (Georgian: ალექსანდრე I, romanized: aleksandre I; c. 1454/56 – April 27, 1511), of the Bagrationi dynasty, was a king (mepe) of Kakheti in eastern Georgia from 1476 to 1511. Alexander's pliancy and flexible diplomacy earned him security from the neighboring powers, only to be murdered by his own son George II "the Bad". He recognized the suzerainty of Shah ("King") Ismail I of Safavid Iran at the beginning of the 16th century.

== Biography ==
Born between 1454 and 1456, Alexander was appointed by his father George I of Kakheti (i.e., George VIII, formerly king of a united Georgia) as a co-ruler in 1460, and succeeded on the throne upon George's death in 1476.

In 1477 Kakheti was attacked by the Aq Qoyunlu nomads who had earlier ravaged the neighboring Georgian kingdom of Kartli. Alexander won peace by sending precious gifts to the Aq Qoyunlu leader Uzun Hasan and succeeded in diverting his attention away from Kakheti. Alexander also preferred to keep peace with the rival Bagrationi branch in Kartli, which recognized him as an independent monarch in 1490.

He was the first Georgian ruler to have attempted to forge an alliance with the co-religionist princes of Moscow in order to counterbalance the growing ambitions of the Safavid dynasty of Iran. After the two Kakhetian embassies, in 1483 and 1491, to Grand Duke Ivan III, whose reign laid the basis for Russian unity, failed to bring any results, Alexander sent, in 1500, his younger son Demetrius to deliver homage to Ismail I (r. 1501–1524), the Shah of Iran, who was on a campaign in Shirvan in the immediate eastern neighborhood of Kakheti. Received with honors by the shah, the mission helped establish stable relations with Iran which would remain more or less peaceful until the early years of the 17th century. This allowed Alexander to strengthen the royal authority and to secure internal stability within his kingdom.

In 1511, Alexander's reign was abruptly terminated in a coup led by his elder son, George, who, suspicious that Alexander intended to deprive him of legacy, had his father executed and his brother, Demetrius, blinded.

== Family ==
Alexander was married twice. His first wife was Ana, daughter of Prince Garsevan Cholokashvili; the second wife is known only by her name, Tinatin. Alexander had two son:

- George II of Kakheti (died 1513), King of Kakheti (r. 1511–1513);
- Prince Demetrius, was blinded by his brother George II. His son David is the forefather of Bagration-Davitishvili branch.

== Bibliography ==
- Toumanoff, Cyril (1976). Manuel de Généalogie et de Chronologie pour l'histoire de la Caucasie chrétienne (Arménie, Géorgie, Albanie) [Manual of Genealogy and Chronology of Christian Caucasian History (Armenia, Georgia, Albania)] (in French). Rome: Edizioni Aquila.

Preceded by George I	King of Kakheti; 1476–1511	Succeeded by George II
