= Palavandishvili =

Coat of arms of the Princes Palavandishvili

The House of Palavandishvili (Georgian: ფალავანდიშვილი) is an ancient Georgian noble family, known from the 12th/13th century and received among the princely nobility of Imperial Russia as Princes Palavandov (Russian: Палавандовы) in the 19th century.

== History ==
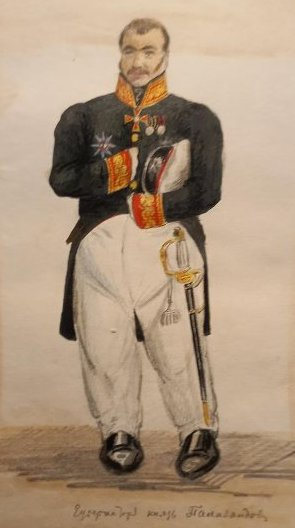
Prince Nikolay Osipovich Palavandov (1790-1855), Imperial Governor of Tbilisi (1830s)

"Palavandishvili" means a warrior. When Georgia had a war, they agreed with their enemy not to shed one's blood and to choose one of their chosen warriors and to fight one on one. After a great battle of two magnificent warriors, Palavandishvili won and inculcated the name of warrior. According to Cyril Toumanoff, dynastic patronymic of this family – Palavandishvili literally translates as “the sons of Palavandi” – betrays their connection with the Armenian house of Pahlavuni of ancient Arsacid (Parthian) stock; and the family legend of migration may be a vague memory of the Palavandishvili's Pahlavid descent.

The Palavandishvili first established themselves in Akhaltsikhe in south Georgian province of Samtskhe which fell to the Ottoman Empire in the 16th century. Most of them then fled northward, in the kingdom of Kartli; those who remained in Samtskhe apostatized to Islam. In Kartli, the family were confirmed in princely rank (tavadi) and received a hereditary fief – known as Sapalavando – in the Prone valley the latter being their offshoot. In the contemporary aristocratic hierarchy, the Palavandishvili were grandees of the first class and vassals to the Princes of Mukhrani. After the Russian annexation of Georgia they were confirmed as princes of the Russian Empire in 1825 and 1850 and they made many marriage with Russian noble families members They are also relative of Bagrationi, Tsitsishvili, Tarkhan-Mouravi, Pahlevi, Khimshiashvili and another dynasty. Famous prince Palavandishvili/Palavandovs are: Eliazar Palavandishvili, ambasador in Russia at the end of the 18-th century, gubernator of Tiflisi gubernia prince Nikoloz Palavandov, filologist and translator Zakaria Palavandov, Prince Ioan son of Antony Palavandov was a member of the education society, Prince Antony son of Ioan Palavandov was a politician-reformer etc.(Prince Palavandishvili house.) Prince Palavandishvili has three coat of arms, oldest coat of arms was approved in 1826(informations are at the archives of the world).
