= Ksani =

River in Georgia

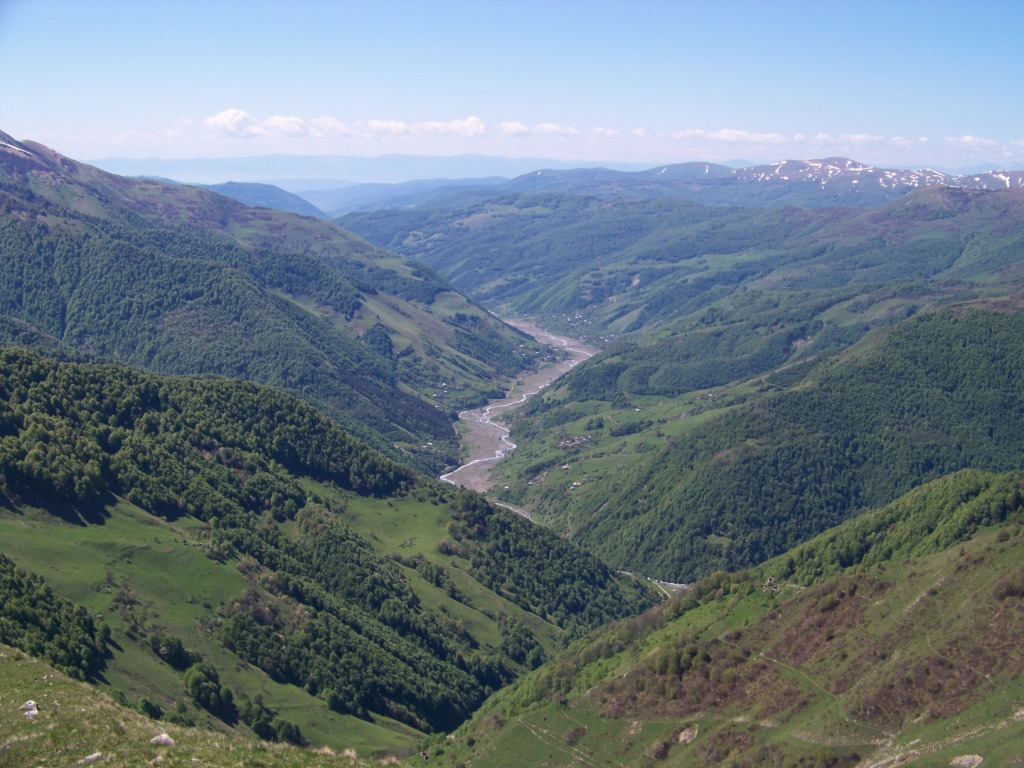
- Ravine of Ksani

- Location within Georgia Location within Caucasus Mountains
- Native name: ქსანი (Georgian); Чысандон (Iron Ossetic)

Location
- Country: Georgia (South Ossetia)

Physical characteristics
- Source: Greater Caucasus
- Mouth: Kura
  - coordinates: 41.8546°N 44.5626°E
- Length: 84 km (52 mi)
- Basin size: 885 km^{2} (342 sq mi)

Basin features
- Progression: Kura→ Caspian Sea

The Ksani (Georgian: ქსანი, Iron Ossetic: Чысандон, Ĉysandon) is a river in central Georgia, which rises on the southern slopes of the Greater Caucasus Mountain Range in South Ossetia and flows into the Kura (Mtkvari). It is a left tributary of the Kura. The Ksani is 84 km (52 mi) long, and has a drainage basin of 885 km^{2} (342 sq mi). Ksani (both the river and the name) is often associated with the Medieval Georgian Ksani fortress which lies near the confluence of the Ksani and the Mtkvari.

== See also ==
- Duchy of Ksani
