= Shio =

Shio or Shiō can refer to:

== People ==
- Shio (Georgian name), Georgian masculine given name
- Shio (Japanese name), Japanese feminine given name
- Shiō Fukuda (Japanese: 福田 師王; born 2004), Japanese football forward
- Shio III of Georgia, the Catholicos-Patriarch of All Georgia.
- Shio Yiu-mei (Chinese: 蕭友梅), Chinese music educator and composer

== Other uses ==
- Shio, Ishikawa, a town located in Hakui District, Isakawa Prefecture, Japan
- Shio-Mgvime monastery, a medieval monastic complex in Georgia
- Shio, Chinese zodiac in Hokkien language
- Shio no Michi, a road in ancient Japan

== See also ==
- Shio, Koshō, a 2009 album by Greeeen
