= Shio (Georgian name) =

Shio (Georgian: შიო) is a Georgian masculine name adaption of the Hebrew name Shimon or Simeon, most commonly associated with the saint Shio of Mgvime. Notable people with the name include:

- Several people with the title "Catholicos-Patriarch of All Georgia":
  - Shio I (fl. 1356–1364)
  - Shio II of Georgia (fl. 1440–1443)
  - Shio III of Georgia, (born 1969), Georgian prelate
- Shio of Mgvime, 6th-century Georgian saint
- Shio Aragvispireli, (1867–1926), Georgian writer
- Shio Batmanishvili, (1885–1937), Georgian Greek Catholic priest
