= Shio-Mgvime Monastery =

Georgian Christian monastery

Coordinates: 41°51′45″N 44°38′25″E

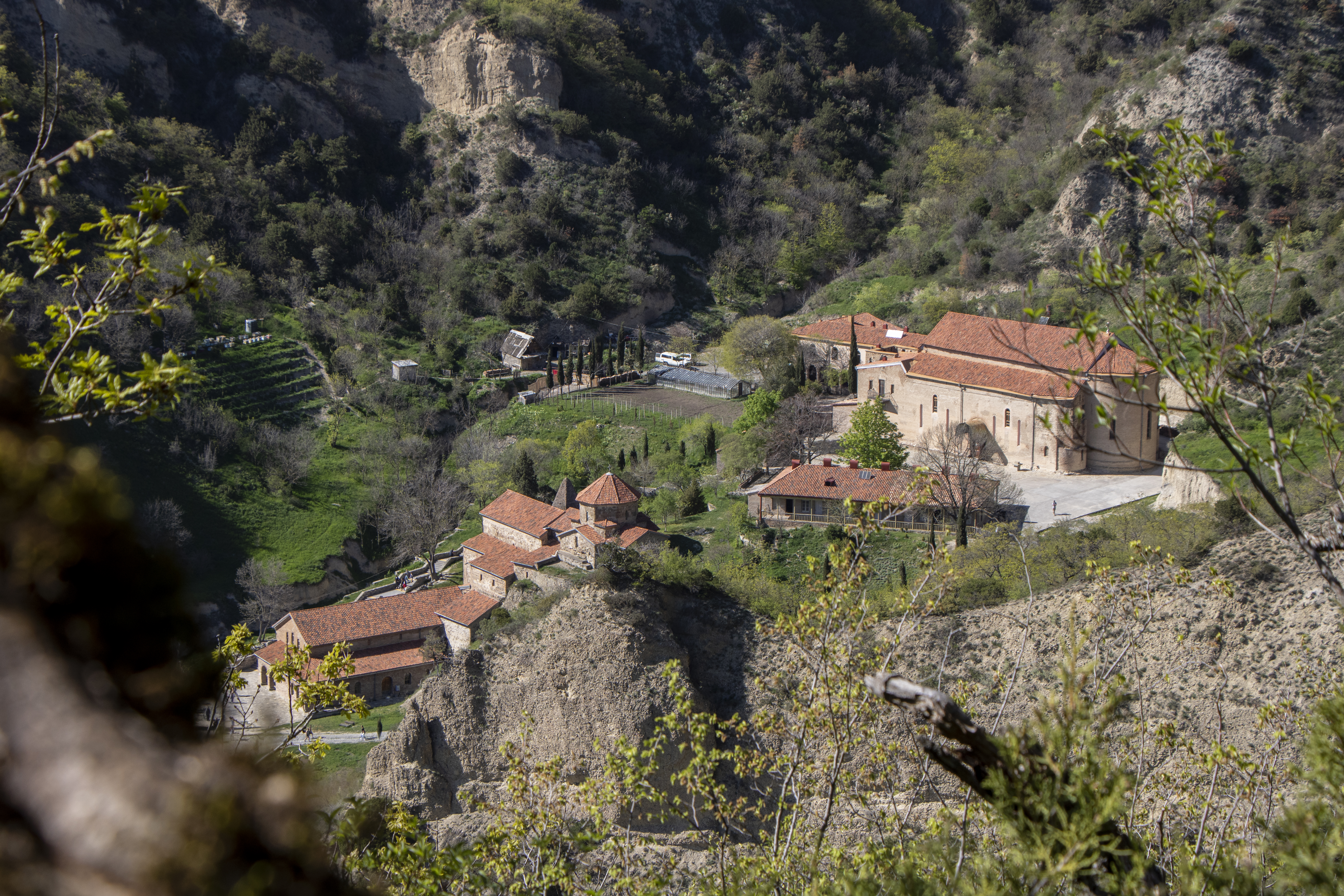
The view of the entire Shio-Mgvime Monastery complex from above.

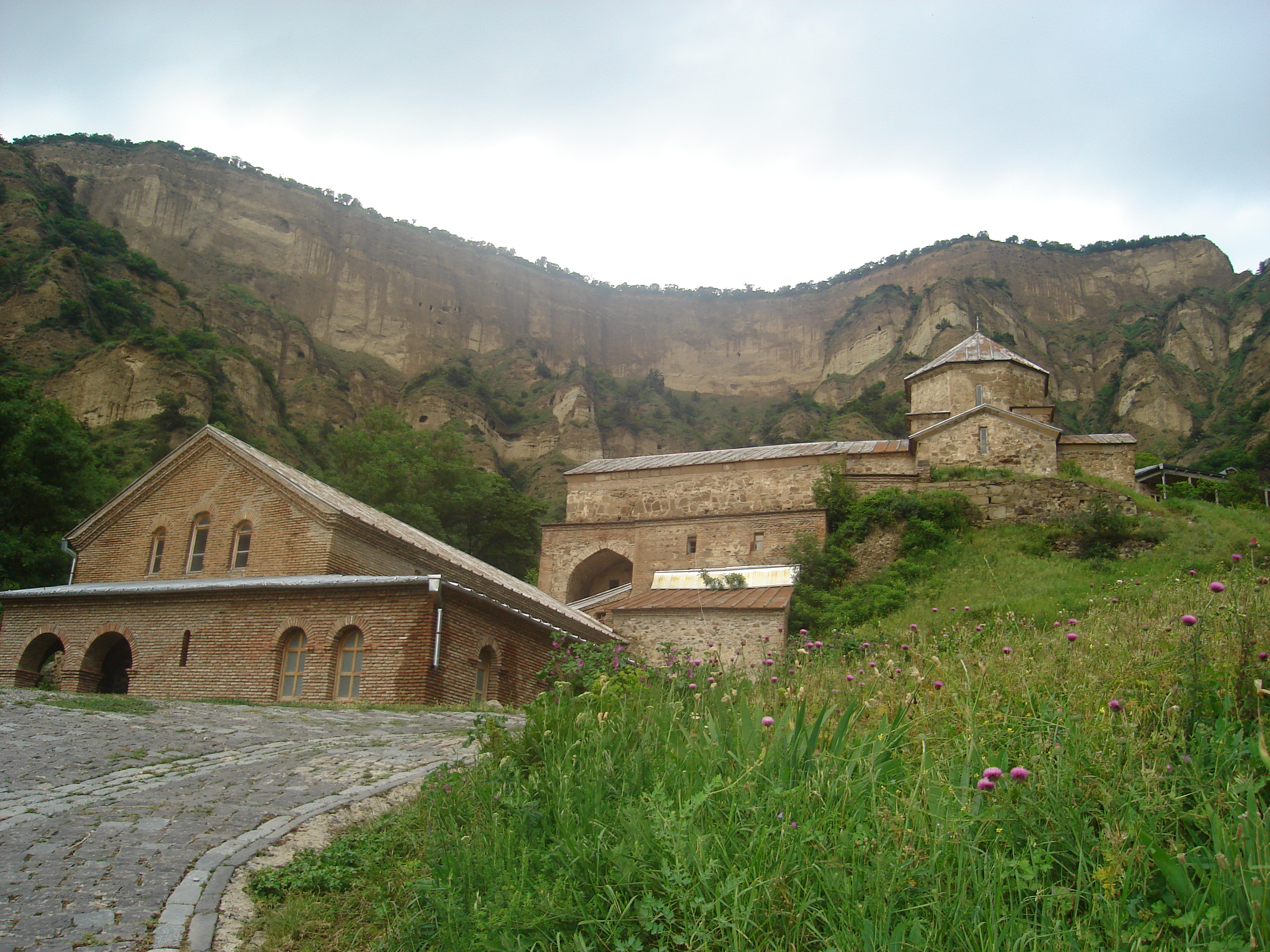
The Shiomgvime Monastery

The Shio-Mgvime Monastery (Georgian: შიომღვიმე, Shiomghvime, meaning "the cave of Shio") is a medieval monastic complex in Georgia, near the town of Mtskheta. It is located in a narrow limestone canyon on the northern bank of the Kura River, some 30 km (19 mi) from Tbilisi, Georgia's capital.

== The Shio-Mgvime complex ==
According to a historic tradition, the first monastic community at this place was founded by the 6th-century monk Shio, one of the Thirteen Assyrian Fathers who came to Georgia as Christian missionaries. St. Shio is said to have spent his last years as a hermit in a deep cave near Mtskheta, which was subsequently named Shiomghvime ("the Cave of Shio") after him. The earliest building, the Monastery of St. John the Baptist, is a cruciform church, very plain and strict in its design, and indeed dates to that time, c. 560s–580s. The caves carved by monks are still visible around the monastery and along the road leading to the complex. The church has an octagonal dome covered with a conical roof and once housed a masterfully ornate stone iconostasis, now on display at the Art Museum of Georgia in Tbilisi. The monastery was modified in the 11th and 18th centuries, but has largely retained its original architecture.

The Upper Church (zemo eklesia) named after the Theotokos is a central part of the Shio-Mgvime complex, and was constructed at the turn of the 12th century at the behest of King David IV of Georgia. Initially a domed church, it was subsequently destroyed by a foreign invasion and restored in 1678 as a basilica. A refectory was built between the 12th and 17th centuries and is directly connected with the Cave of St. Shio. A 12th-century small chapel adorned with medieval murals stands separately on a nearby hill.

An archaeological expedition revealed, in 1937, a 2 km (1.2 mi) long aqueduct supplying the monastic communities from the nearby village of Skhaltba, an aqueduct chronicled in 1202 as having been constructed by Bishop Anton of Chkondidi, a minister at Queen Thamar's court.

== History ==
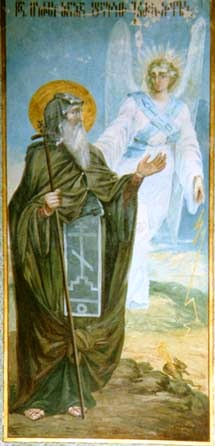
St. Shio, an eponymous founder of the monastery, as depicted on a 19th-century mural.

Shio-Mgvime quickly became the largest monastic community in Georgia and by the end of the 6th century it was populated by as many as 2,000 monks. It became a vibrant center of cultural and religious activities and remained under the personal patronage of the Catholicos of Georgia. David IV "the Builder" (1089–1125) made it a royal domain and established regulations (typicon) for the monastery in 1123. The downfall of the medieval Georgian kingdom and incessant foreign invasions resulted in the decline of the monastery. It saw a relative revival when the Georgian king George VIII (r. 1446–1465) granted Shio-Mgvime and its lands to the noble family of Zevdginidze-Amilakhvari to whom the monastery served as a family burial ground until the 1810s.

The monastery was ravaged by invading Persian troops under Shah Abbas I of Safavid in 1614–1616. Prince Givi Amilakhvari reconstructed it in 1678, but the Ottoman occupation of the 1720s of Georgia brought about another devastation and depopulation of Shio-Mgvime. Restored by Prince Givi Amilakhvari (1689–1754) in 1733, the monastery was raided and the monks were massacred by the Persians less than two years later. Shio-Mgvime was restored and its interior renovated in the 19th century, but it never regained its past importance and role in the spiritual life of Georgia. Under Bolshevik rule, the monastery was closed, but it is now active and attracts many pilgrims and tourists.

== Gallery ==
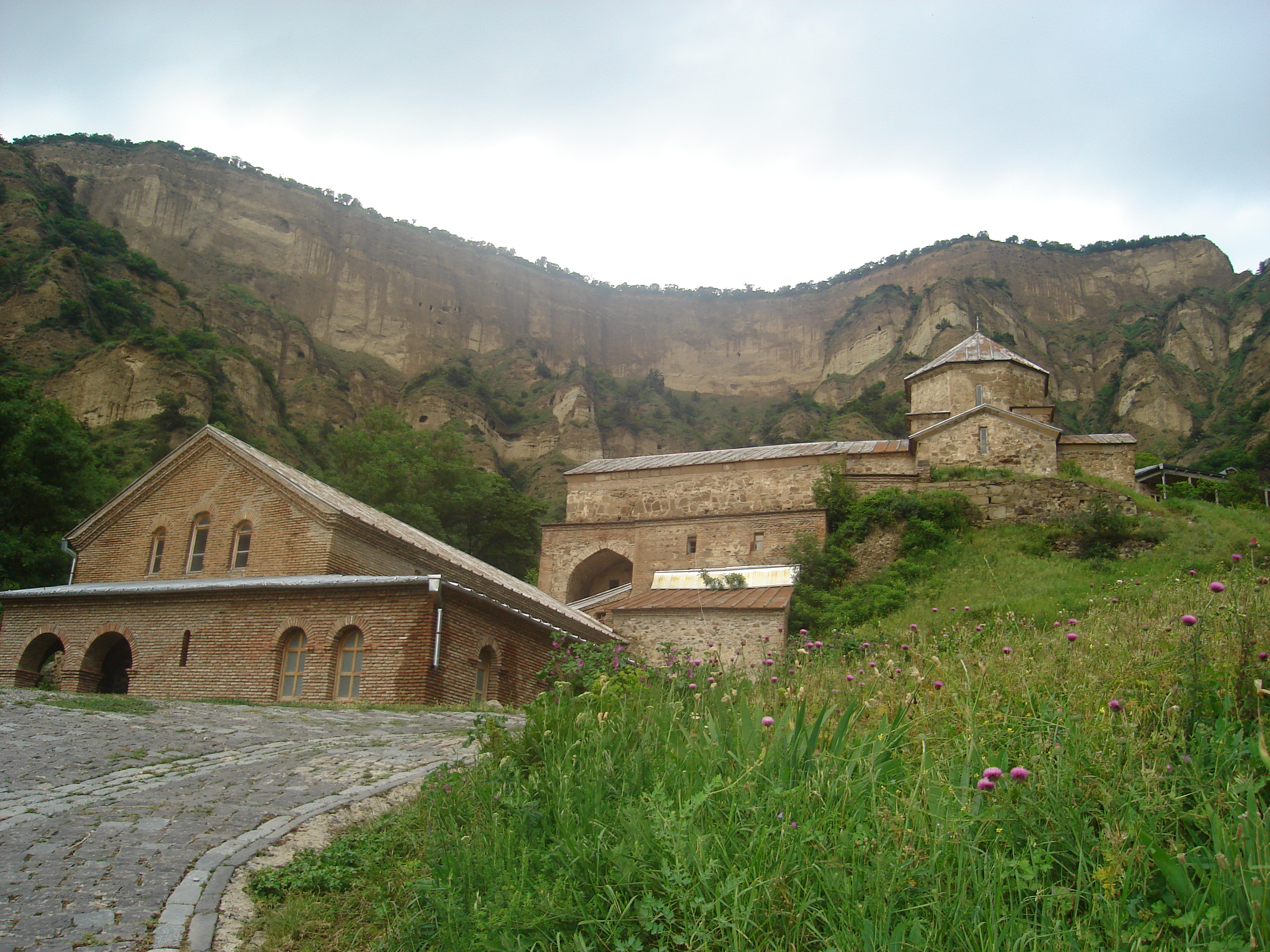

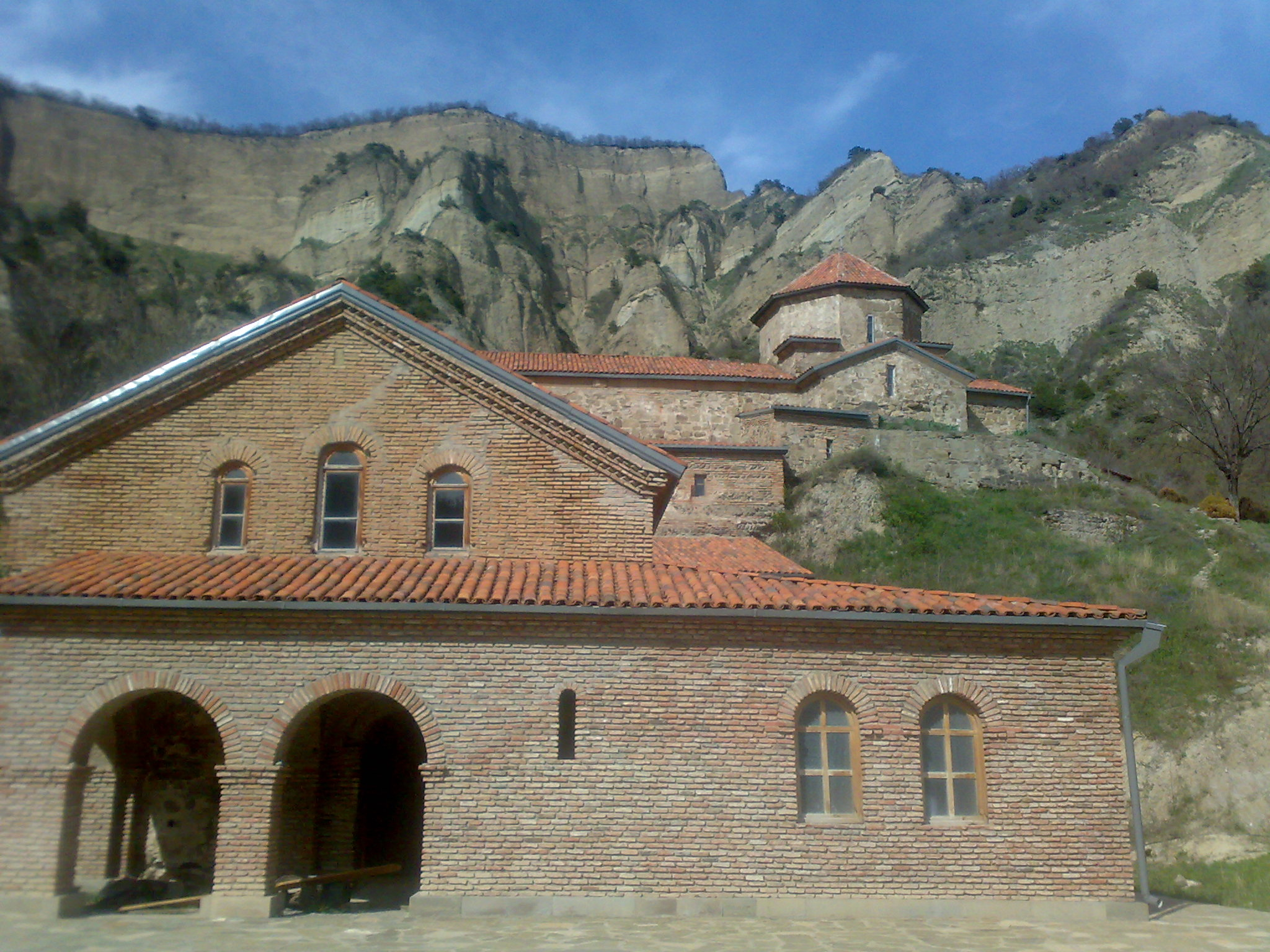

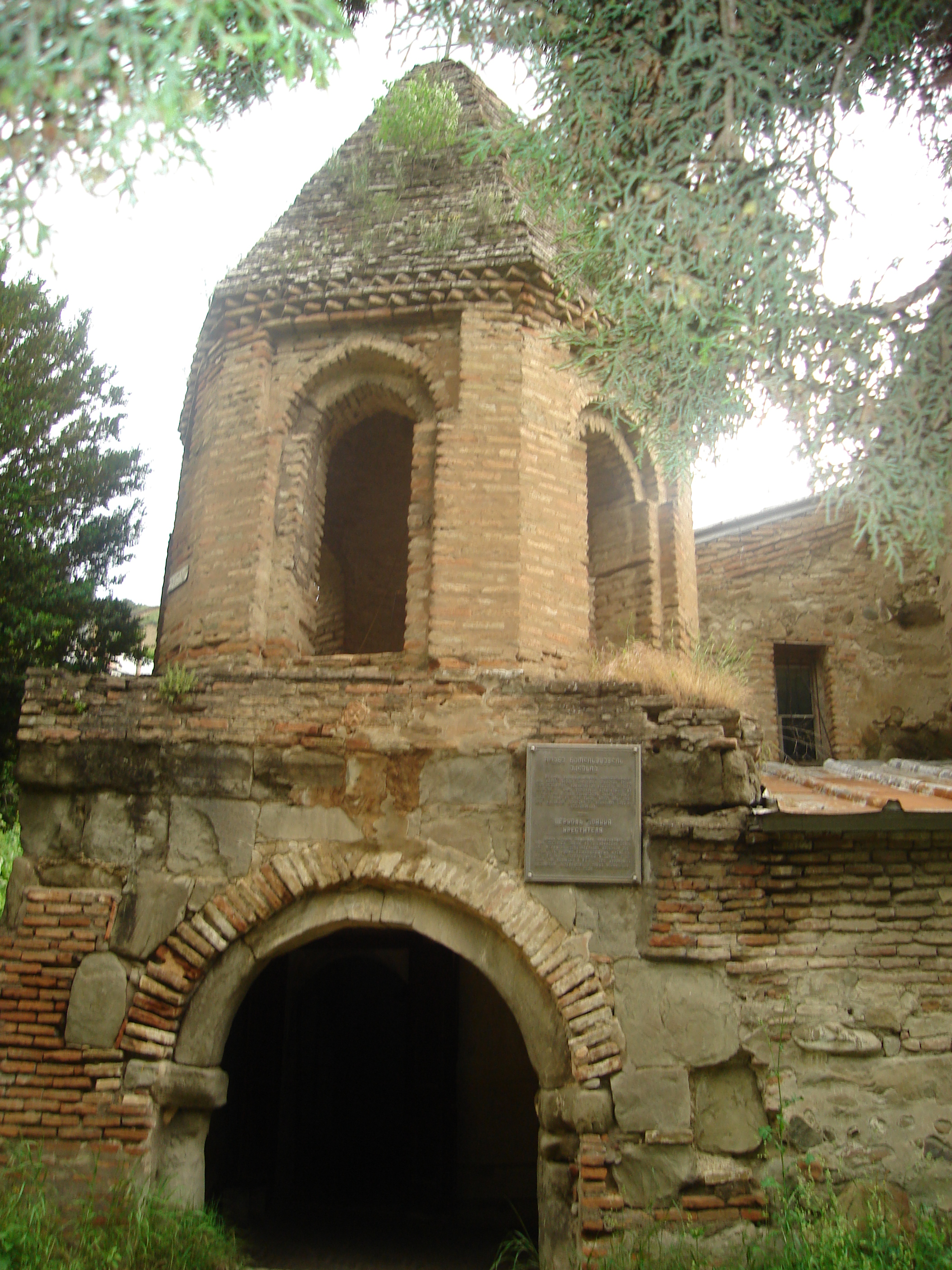

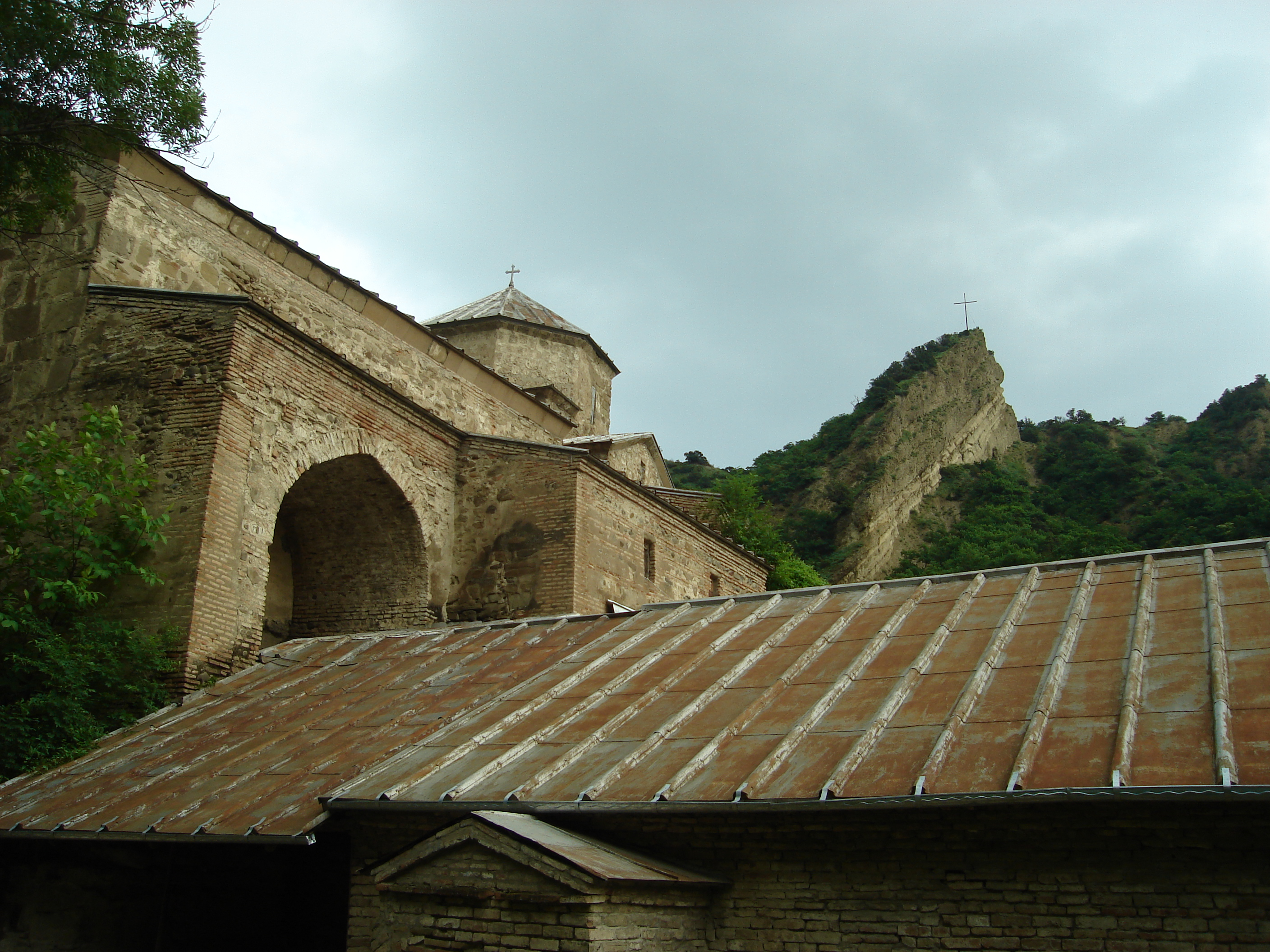

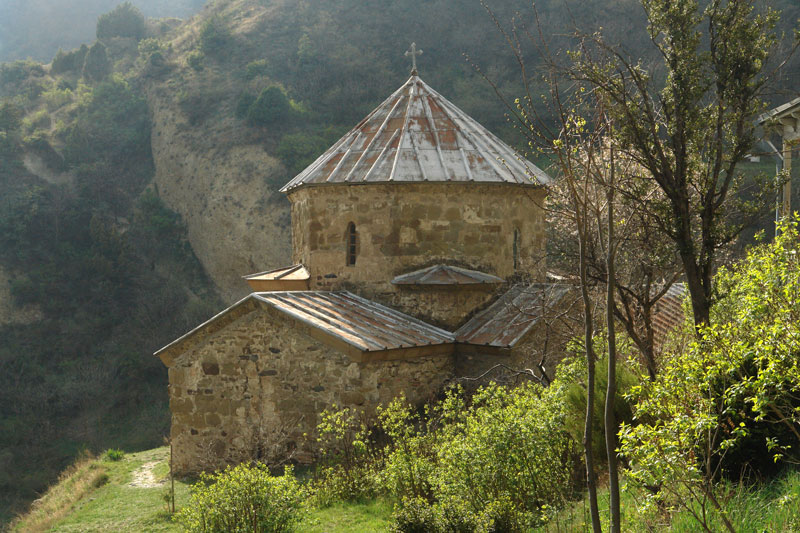

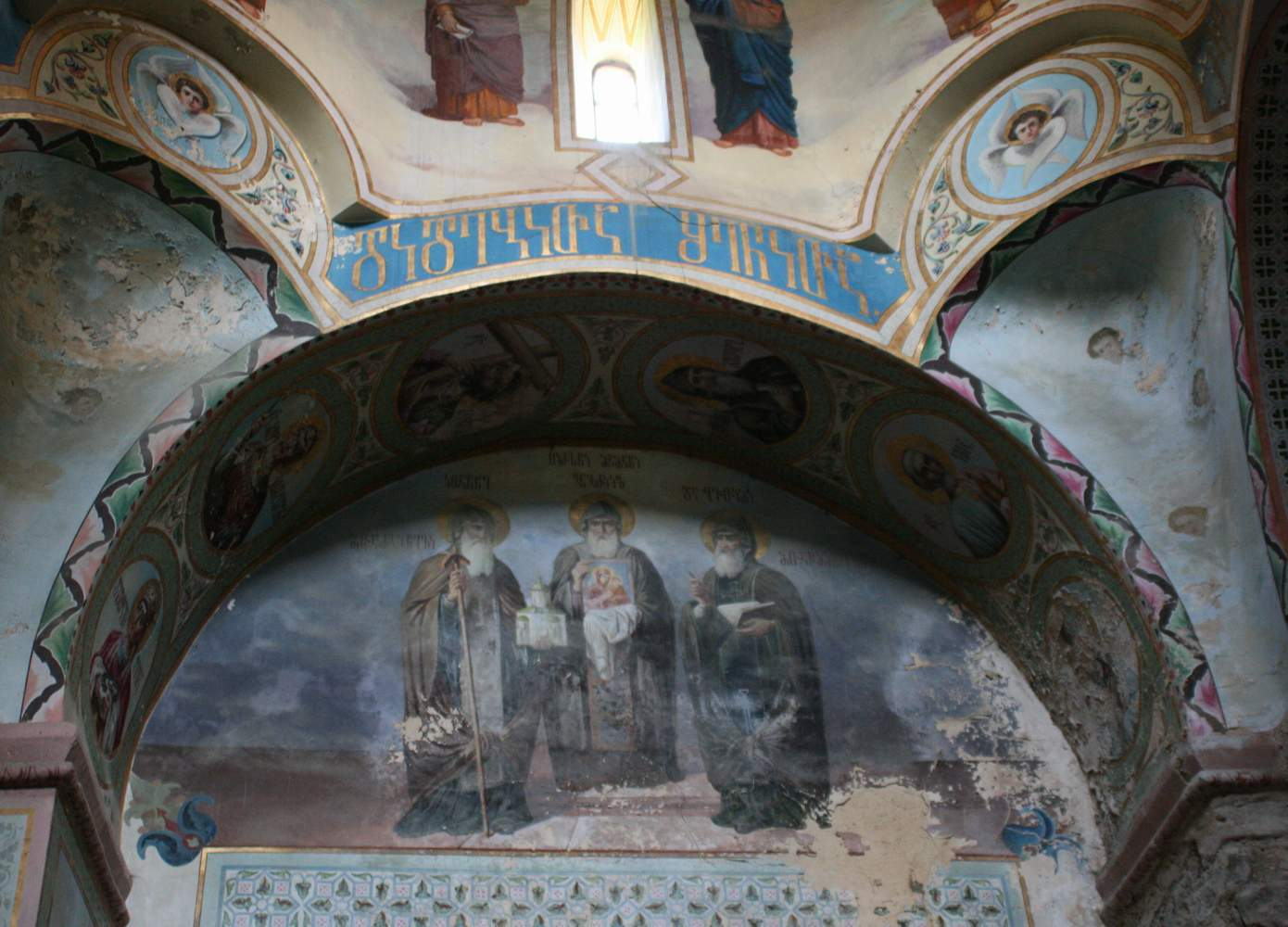

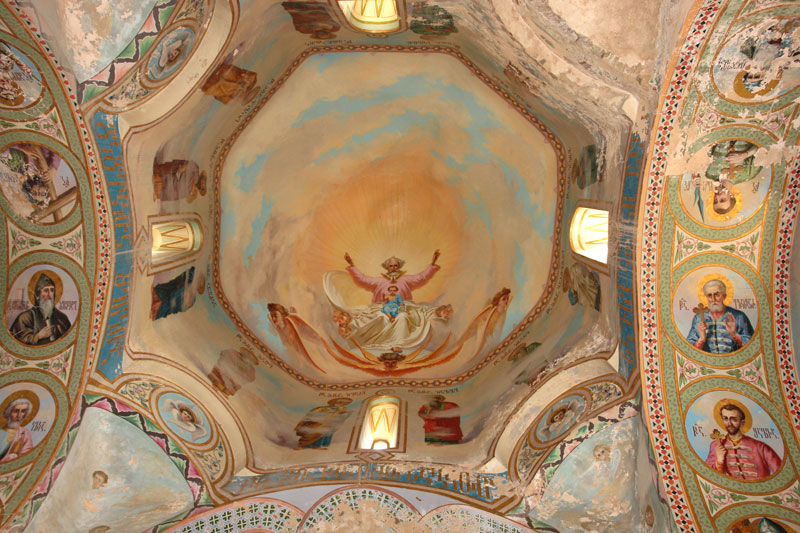

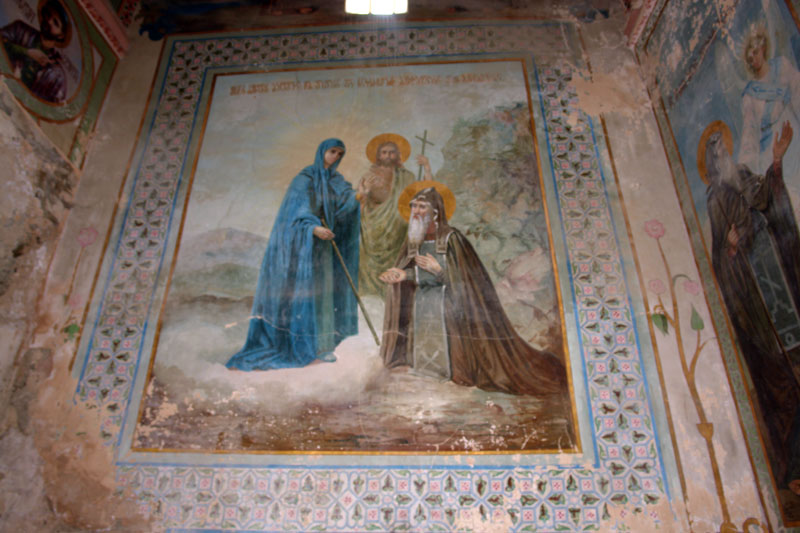

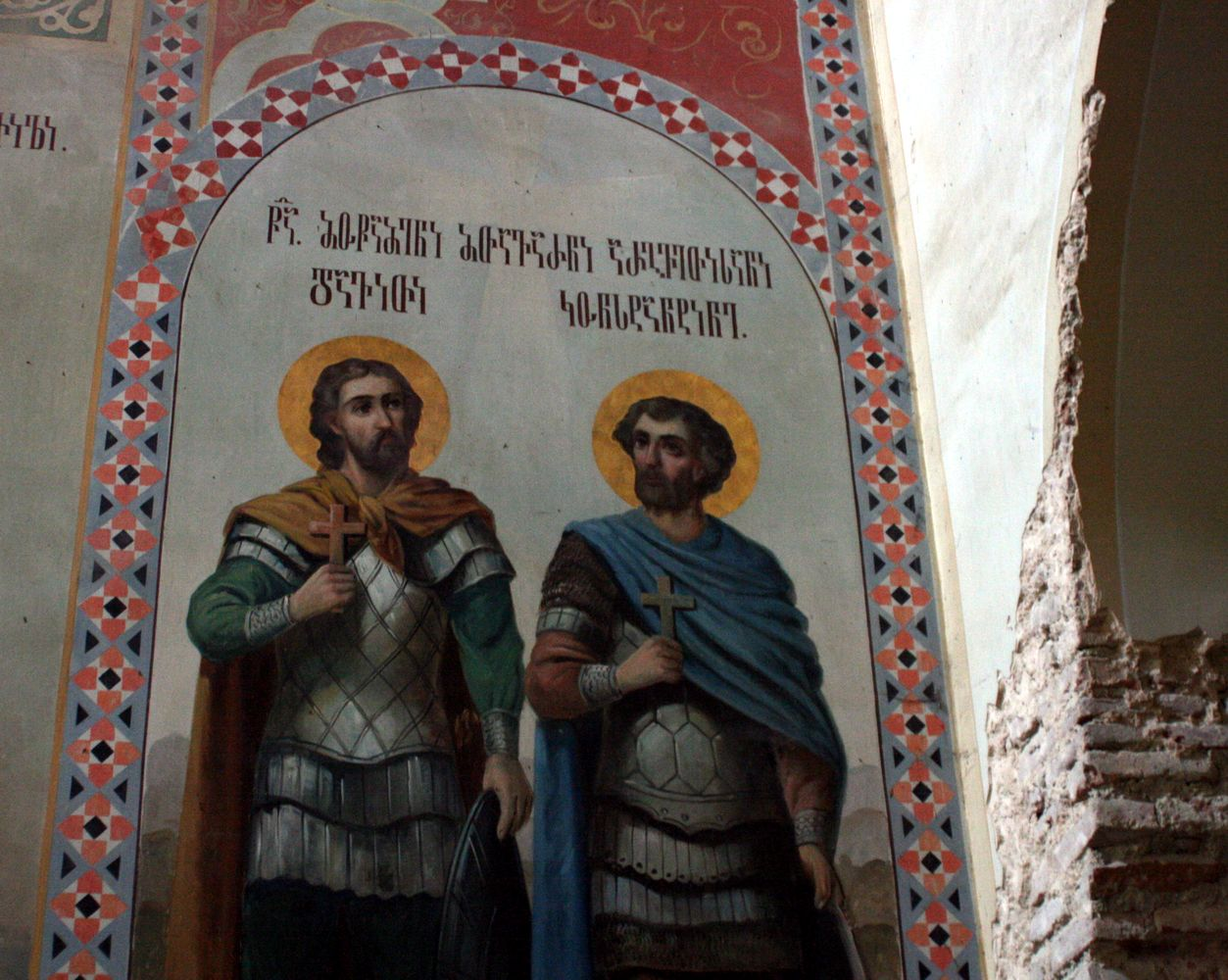

== See also ==
- August Uprising
