= Shio (Japanese name) =

Shio (Japanese: しお) is a Japanese feminine given name. Notable people with the name include:

- Shio Fujii (Japanese: 藤井 紫緒; born 1985), Japanese handball player
- Shio Kisui (Japanese: 希水 しお), Japanese voice actress and singer
- Shio Satō (Japanese: 佐藤 史生; 1952–2010), Japanese manga artist
