= Shio of Mgvime =

Georgian saint

Saint Shio of Mgvime
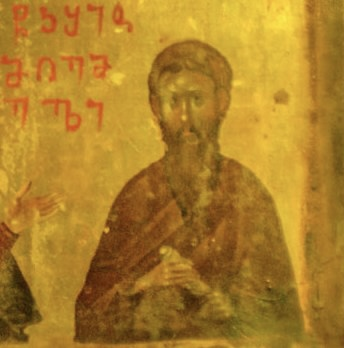
- Shio on 14th-century triptych, kept at the Saint Catherine's Monastery on Mount Sinai

Bishop, Preacher
- Born: Antioch, Byzantine Empire
- Died: Mtskheta, Kingdom of Iberia
- Venerated in: Eastern Orthodox Church
- Major shrine: Shio-Mgvime monastery
- Feast: May 22
- Patronage: Georgia

Shio of Mgvime (Georgian: შიო მღვიმელი, romanized: shio mghvimeli; lit.'Shio of the Cave'), sometimes known as Simeon of Mgvime, was a 6th century anchorite, desert father, thaumaturgus and one of the thirteen Assyrian apostles of the Georgian kingdom of Iberia. He is venerated as a saint who introduced the notion of a strict ascetic life to the Georgian Church.

== Life ==
He was born in Antioch. At the age of 20, he became a disciple of the famous hermit John of Zedazeni, distributed his property to peasants and monasteries, and became a monk himself. In the middle of the 6th century, he lived in Mtskheta. Monk Shio separated from his brethren and founded the Shio-Mgvime monastery on Sarkine mountain. Initially, Shio lived in a small cave, which was converted into a church around the 9th century, the monastery became a large organization during the time of Shio. On his own initiative, the first church named after John the Baptist was built here. Shio performed an extraordinary feats of endurance, by spending the last years of his life in total seclusion, in a 12 metre deep cave, he was buried there. His feast day is on May 22.

== See also ==
- David of Gareji
- Joseph of Alaverdi
- Shio III

== Bibliography ==
- Rapp, S. H. Jr (2014) The Sasanian World through Georgian Eyes: Caucasia and the Iranian Commonwealth in Late Antique Georgian Literature, Ashgate Publishing, ISBN 978-1-4724-2552-2
- Soltes, O. (1999) National Treasures of Georgia, Bloomsbury, ISBN 978-0-85667-501-0
- Tchekhanovets, Y. (2018) The Caucasian Archaeology of the Holy Land: Armenian, Georgian and Albanian Communities Between the Fourth and Eleventh Centuries CE, ISBN 978-90-04-36555-1
- Charkiewicz, J. (2005) Gruzińscy święci, Warszawa: Warszawska Metropolia Prawosławna, ISBN 978-83-60311-87-5
