= Givi Amilakhvari (1689–1754) =

Georgian nobleman

- Born: 1689; Kingdom of Kartli
- Died: 1754 (aged 64–65); Kingdom of Kartli

Givi Amilakhvari (Georgian: გივი ამილახვარი; 1689–1754) was a Georgian nobleman (tavadi) with a prominent role in the politics of eastern Georgia in the first half of the 18th century. He waged a lengthy struggle against the Ottoman and Iranian encroachments, changing sides and forging various alliances as he tried to preserve autonomy for his native kingdom of Kartli as well as to prevent the ascendant Bagrationi dynasty of the neighboring Georgian kingdom of Kakheti from seizing the throne of Kartli. In the closing years of his turbulent life, Amilakhvari stood by his erstwhile Kakhetian foes and sponsored several construction projects across the country.

== Early career ==
Givi, son of Prince Andukapar, was born of the prominent noble family of Amilakhvari, with family links to the ruling house of Bagrationi of Mukhrani. Givi's paternal grandmother was Tamar, daughter of king Vakhtang V. His name "Givi" is derived from the Persian Giv, a name of the hero from Ferdowsi's Shahnameh. He inherited from his father a large fiefdom in Inner Kartli (Upper Kartli) called Saamilakhoro and the office of governor (mouravi) of Gori. He first appeared on the political scene of Kartli in 1722. The following year saw the overthrow of his overlord and relative, King Vakhtang VI, by the Ottomans whose occupation of Kartli would last until 1735. During these years, Givi Amilakhvari intermittently fought and cooperated with the Ottoman regime. In 1726, he used his influence to save the principal Georgian Orthodox cathedral of Sioni in Tbilisi, the Ottoman-occupied capital of Kartli, from being converted to a mosque. In 1727, he became a sanjak-bey of Upper Kartli. He then joined the Ottoman expeditions against the rebellious Georgian nobility of Kakheti and the marauding Dagestani clansmen.

== Revolt against the Ottoman Empire ==
In 1734 the Ottoman fortunes began to reverse in the Caucasus as the resurgent Iranians under Tahmasp Qoli Khan (the future shah Nader) gained an upper hand. Givi Amilakhvari quickly switched the side. He seized Gori from the Ottoman garrison in a surprise attack, rode to join Nader before Ganja and helped expel the Ottoman forces from Tbilisi. As Nader's ambitions grew, the Iranian hegemony began to ruin the country's economy. Heavy taxes were levied by the governor of Kartli, Kilij Ali-Khan (Khanjal), for the costs of the shah's Indian campaigns, soldiers were conscripted and noble hostages were sent to Iran. Amilakhvari was one of those Georgian nobles who were taken as hostages rather than as volunteers along the road to Nader's camp at Kandahar in 1735. Givi Amilakhvari managed to escape and took to the hills, whence he joined Shanshe, Duke of Ksani and Prince Vakhushti Abashidze in an anti-Iranian insurrection. The turmoil disrupted betrothal of Givi's daughter Tamar with the Mukhranian prince Teimuraz (eventually Catholicos Anton I of Georgia), nephew of ex-king Vakhtang VI. The girl was carried off by the Iranian soldiers during a wedding ceremony at the church, forcing the 16-year-old Teimuraz to seek refuge at a monastery. Amilakhvari himself was soon captured and forced to fight in the Iranian ranks in India. An able fighter, Amilakhvari was restored to favor with Nader Shah, who sent him back to Georgia to counter the irreconcilable duke Shanshe of Ksani. Shanshe's use of Dagestani and Turkish mercenaries deprived him of popular support and the rebellious duke was easily defeated. Givi Amilakhvari was rewarded with Shanshe's fief of Ksani.

== Alliance and war with Iran ==
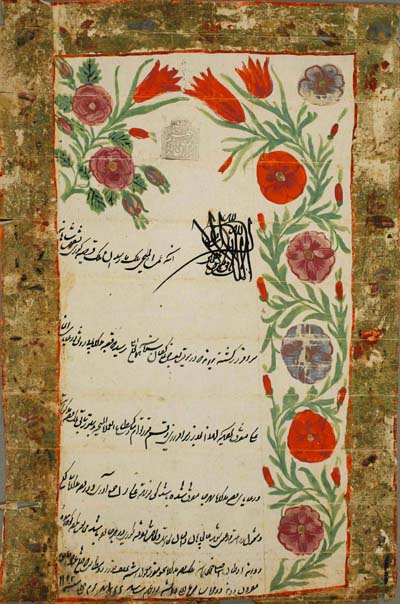
Nader Shah's 1747 farman ("decree") to Melik Parsadan on granting the Gori villages to Givi Amilakhori

In 1741, Givi Amilakhvari was appointed as a governor (wakil) of Kartli for the shah of Iran and reconfirmed as Prince of Saamilakhoro and Duke (eristavi) of Ksani, thereby becoming the most influential Georgian nobleman in eastern Georgia. Later in 1741 he took part in the Nader's difficult campaign against Dagestan which cost Nader thousands of his troops and undermined the situation in Georgia. Nader summoned the leading Georgian nobles to Derbend and covered them with gifts. Of them, the increasingly influential, flexible and calculating Kakhetian King Teimuraz II endeavored to persuade the shah to ease tribute levied upon Georgia, while Amilakhvari suddenly fled to Tbilisi and mounted a rebellion, more formidable than that of Shanshe. He recruited the Turkish auxiliaries and sought Ottoman support to put the Russian-based Mukhranian prince Bakar, son of Vakhtang VI (deposed back in 1723) and brother-in-law to Teimuraz, on the throne. A series of battles were fought at Gori and along the Aragvi river in which, despite initial setback, Teimuraz and his son Heraclius, with the Iranians, defeated Amilakhvari and his Turks. In 1742, the troops of Imam-Quli Khan established a camp near Kvemo Chala castle, and Givi decided to attack, causing Iranians to retreat. In another successful battle, Givi fought against united forces of Fatali Khan and Kerim Khan in the mountains near his castle. After the decisive battle at Achabeti in 1744, Amilakhvari surrendered to Teimuraz's wife, Tamar, at Surami and was treated by the victors with much consideration. In reward for their display of loyalty, Nader Shah gave full control over all of eastern Georgia to the father and son, confirming Teimuraz as king of Kartli and senior monarch, and his son Heraclius as king of Kakheti and junior monarch.

== Last years ==
Amilakhvari was sent to Nader's court at Isfahan, where he was converted to Islam under the name of Shah-Quli-Khan. He was honored by Nader and made a commander (qullar-agasi) of the shah's élite guards (ghulām). By 1747 Nader's relations with Teimuraz and Erekle had become soured over the Georgians' increasingly independent policies. Nader placed Amilakhvari at the head of 30,000 troops to reinforce the Iranian hegemony in the Caucasus. The shah's assassination on June 19, 1747, and the ensuing turmoil in Iran rendered this military endeavor abortive. In 1749 Amilakhvari gathered the surviving Georgians and fought his way back to Georgia. He reconciled with Teimuraz and Erekle and reconverted to Christianity. Teimuraz appointed him a governor (mouravi) of Tbilisi. During these years Amilakhvari sponsored several construction projects, renovating and building churches and fortresses across the country. He died in 1754 and was buried at the ancestral abbey at Shio-Mgvime Monastery, which had been refurbished by himself.

== Family ==
Givi Amilakhvari was married twice. The identity of his first wife is unknown. In 1732, he married his second wife, Bangua (died 29 July 1766), daughter of Prince Vakhushti Orbeliani. His children were:

- Anduqapar (died 1742);
- Tamar, who was forcibly married to Nader Shah in 1735. Before that, she had been betrothed to Prince Teimuraz (Anton I of Georgia);
- Giorgi (Gogia) (fl. 1739–1805), who married Ephemia (fl. 1777), daughter of Prince Dimitri Orbeliani;
- David (Datuna) (died 1800);
- Ioane (fl. 1792–1812);
- Mariam, who married Elizbar Taktakishvili.

== Ancestry ==
Ancestors of Givi Amilakhvari (1689–1754)

16. Papuna Amilakhvari
8. Iotam Amilakhvari (d. 1649)
17. Tamar, daughter of Prince Vakhtang of Kartli
4. Givi Amilakhvari (d. 1700)
2. Andukapar Amilakhvari (fl. 1665–1683)
20. Teimuraz I, Prince of Mukhrani
10. Vakhtang V
21. Ana (fl. 1618), daughter of Nugzar, Duke of Aragvi
5. Tamar of Kartli (d. 1695)
22. Qaplan Baratashvili-Orbelishvili
11. Rodam Qaplanishvili-Orbeliani
23. Tamar N., daughter of Meskhian amilakhor
1. Givi Amilakhvari
12. Nugzar, Duke of Aragvi
25. Ana N.
6. Zaal, Duke of Aragvi
26. Oman Cholokashvili
13. Mariam Cholokashvili
3. Ana-Khanum of Aragvi (d. 1718)
28. Gorgasal Chkheidze
14. N. Chkheidze
29. Anakhanum Tsitsishvili (d. 1629)
7. N. Chkheidze

== Source ==
- Suny, Ronald Grigor (1994). The Making of the Georgian Nation. Indiana University Press. ISBN 978-0253209153.
