= Karbelashvili brothers =

Georgian brothers and tradition preservers

Saints Karbelashvili brothers
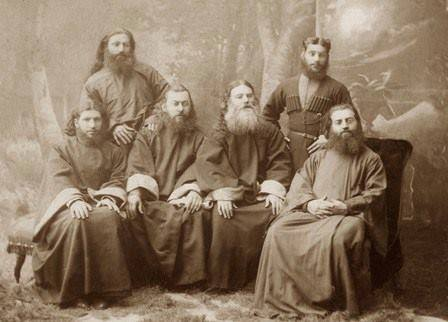
- The five Karbelashvili brothers and their father Grigol

Confessors and Martyrs
- Venerated in: Eastern Orthodox Church
- Canonized: 20 December 2011 by Georgian Orthodox Church
- Feast: 6 September

The Karbelashvili brothers – Pilimon, Andria, Petre, Polievktos (known as the Confessor), and Vasil (religious name Stepane, known also as Stepane the Confessor) – were five brothers from Georgia active in the preservation of Georgian musical and religious traditions during the late nineteenth and early twentieth century. For their efforts they were canonized by the Georgian Orthodox Church in 2011.

== Family ==
The five brothers, along with their sister Sidonia, were the children of Grigol Karbelashvili (1812–1880), a priest in the village of Kvemo Chala. The elder Karbelashvili was the son of Petre Karbela (Khmaladze), who had in his youth been a chanter at the court of Erekle II, Prince of Mukhrani, and who went on to teach chant at the Samtavisi Cathedral. Grigol was himself also well-versed in the fields of church chant and reading, having studied music with his father; further educated at Shio-Mgvime monastery between 1820 and 1824, he was ordained a clergyman in 1849. He imparted his musical interests to his sons, each of whom came to be active in religious and pedagogical life. The brothers first sang together in 1864, performing folk songs at a gathering near Nishevo Castle on May 1. With Makari Batatashvili and others Grigol was active in early efforts by the church to preserve traditional chant, founding a school for the purpose in the 1860s.

=== Pilimon Karbelashvili ===
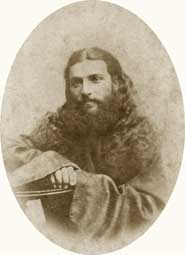
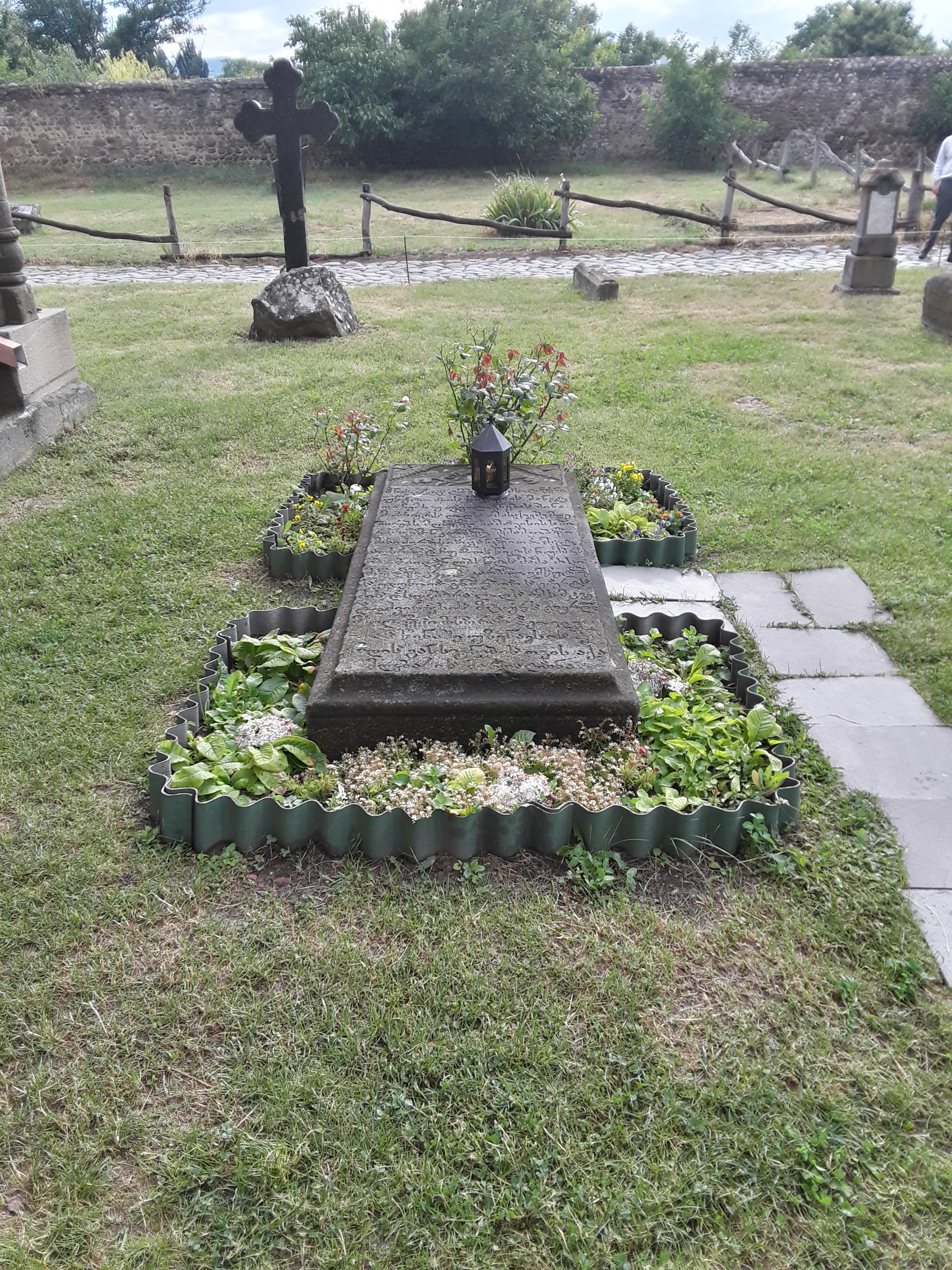
Left: Portrait of Pilimon Karbelashvili. Right: his grave at Samtavisi Cathedral.

Eldest of the brothers, Pilimon (1836–1879) was first educated at home by his father. Later he traveled to Tbilisi for further study at the seminary there. He returned to his native village in 1860 upon his ordination, and began an active church career. It has been said of him that he would perform the divine liturgy accompanied by the chanting of his brothers in such a manner that the church was filled beyond capacity by residents not only of Samtavisi but of the surrounding villages as well. Pilimon was also active as an educator, opening a village school where he taught Georgian history, chanting, reading, writing, and counting. His talents as a preacher, chanter, and educator earned him the label "exemplary". Among his acquaintances was Ilia Chavchavadze, whom he met through Niko Meskhishvili. At his death Pilimon was buried in the churchyard of Samtavisi Cathedral, where his grave may still be visited.

=== Andria Karbelashvili ===
Hieromartyr Andria Karbelashvili (1851–1924) was the second child of the family, and undertook his earliest studies at home. His brothers recognized his abilities as a chanter and clergyman, and he was known as well for his intelligence. In 1903 he became prior of the Church of the Dormition of the Mother of God in Kvemo Chala, remaining in that position until the Soviets came to power, at which time he was forced to leave religious life. When the Bolsheviks came to destroy or otherwise confiscate the property of the Amilakhvari and other noble families, Andria was instrumental in saving may items. Andria and his brother Petre were among the intellectuals taken to Gori for interrogation by the communists during the August Uprising, and were executed in the Tiripona Valley along with others.

=== Polievktos Karbelashvili ===
Polievktos Karbelashvili (1855–1936) was born in Kvemo Chala and was educated at the seminaries in Gori and Tbilisi. He was active in the restoration of autocephaly to the Georgian Orthodox Church, and worked to preserve Georgian language, culture, and chant. During his career he was active as a writer, publishing many books and articles on a variety of subjects from Georgian history and culture. With his brother Vasil he notated and collected traditional chant; he also produced religious texts and edited works by Georgian writers. He was especially well-known for his library of historical materials, and he worked to preserve documents from the churches and monasteries of Svaneti; his work also included the collection of traditional Georgian surnames and their origins. Many of the documents which he transcribed are no longer extant, making his copies the only record of their contents in existence. Karbelashvili was well-acquainted with many of the intellectuals of his time, cultivating relationships with Ilia Chavchavadze, Akaki Tsereteli, Niko Nikoladze, and many others. He was buried in Gurjaani at his death in 1936.

The National Archives of Georgia holds an extensive archive related to Polievktos and his career, including many personal papers.

=== Vasil Karbelashvili ===
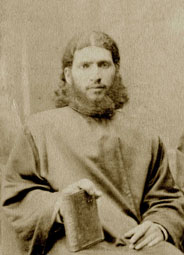
An 1885 portrait of Vasil Karbelashvili

Vasil Karbelashvili, known as Stepane the Confessor (January 1, 1858 – April 8, 1936) was born in Kvemo Chala, and received his earliest education at home. At the age of nine he was taken to Tbilisi for further study by his parents; there he introduced other students to the Kartli-Kakhetian chant he had learned as a child. He went on to the theological seminary in Gori for further study, graduating in 1881. The following year he entered the Moscow Conservatory, but he did not stay, returning to Georgia in 1883. That same year he was ordained first as a deacon, and next as a priest; he saw service at churches and monasteries in Tbilisi and Kakheti. An ardent Georgian nationalist and supporter of the autocephaly of the Georgian church, he entered into a high-profile conflict with a number of pro-Russian officials, for which he was exiled to Azerbaijan in February 1903. He was joined in his exile by his wife Mariam, with whom he had six children. On October 24, 1925, he was consecrated a monk, at which time he received the name Stepane. At this time he became the Bishop of Bodbe; in 1928 he was transferred to the Alaverdi Diocese. In 1934 he ceased performing the divine liturgy, and soon thereafter he retired.

During his career Vasil was active as a preserver of chant and as an educator, teaching Georgian language, music, and catechism at various institutions around Georgia. He published two collections of chant, in 1897 and 1898. He wrote extensively on the subject of the autocephalous church, and his letters were published in many Georgian periodicals; he was also active in the distribution of anti-imperialist materials in Georgia, and fought to introduce the teaching of the Georgian language in schools. At his death he was buried in the wall of the church of St. Barbara in Navtlug. The Georgian National Center of Manuscripts holds his personal archive.

=== Petre Karbelashvili ===
Hieromartyr Petre Karbelashvili (1860–1924) received his education at the theological school in Gori. Beginning in 1878 he acted as a psalm reader at various churches, at the same time teaching reading and writing. In 1889 he began to teach the principles of Kartli-Kakhetian chant at the theological seminary in Tbilisi. He received his ordination in 1900 and returned to his native village, Sakorintlo, to begin his ecclesiastical career; he continued to work in churches and monasteries around Shida Kartli, and in the 1920s began working in Mukhrani parish. It was here that he was arrested during the August Uprising; with his brother Andria and others he was executed in the Tiripona Valley.

== Chant ==
Efforts to translate traditional three-part Georgian chant into the Western system of five-line notation were begun in 1882. The process of notating chants from west Georgia was undertaken by Philimon Koridze, while the process for east Georgia was overseen by Mikhail Ippolitov-Ivanov. It fell to Bishop Alexandre Okropiridze to select the chant collectors to be involved in the process; he chose Vasil and Polievktos for the task, along with Grigol Mghebrishvili and Alexandre Molodinashvili. Once the process of notation was complete, the first volume of chant, vespers, in the Kartli-Kakhetian mode was published in 1896, followed by a volume of matins in 1898. In 1899 an edition of the Divine Liturgy of Saint John Chrysostom edited by Vasil Karbelashvili was published.

Among the chants set down by the brothers was Shen khar venakhi, among the most important hymns in the Georgian church. In 1909 this was arranged for six-voice chorus by Zakharia Paliashvili. In the 1950s it was reduced to a three-voice format, in which it was frequently performed by the Rustavi Ensemble; today this is known as the "Paliashvili" variant, and is the most popular variant of the hymn in current use. Paliashvili went on to develop an entire setting of the Divine Liturgy using as its basis the Karbelashvilis' chants, which he rearranged for five- and six-voice choir, and which he published in both Georgian and Church Slavonic. The brothers, however, were outraged at what they perceived to be a profanation of traditional music. Paliashvili's work did, however, aid in the preservation of the brothers' work; traditional chant was aggressively squelched under Soviet rule, but the Paliashvili versions were known and continued to be performed in private, often in three-part settings meant to recall traditional Georgian singing.

== Legacy ==
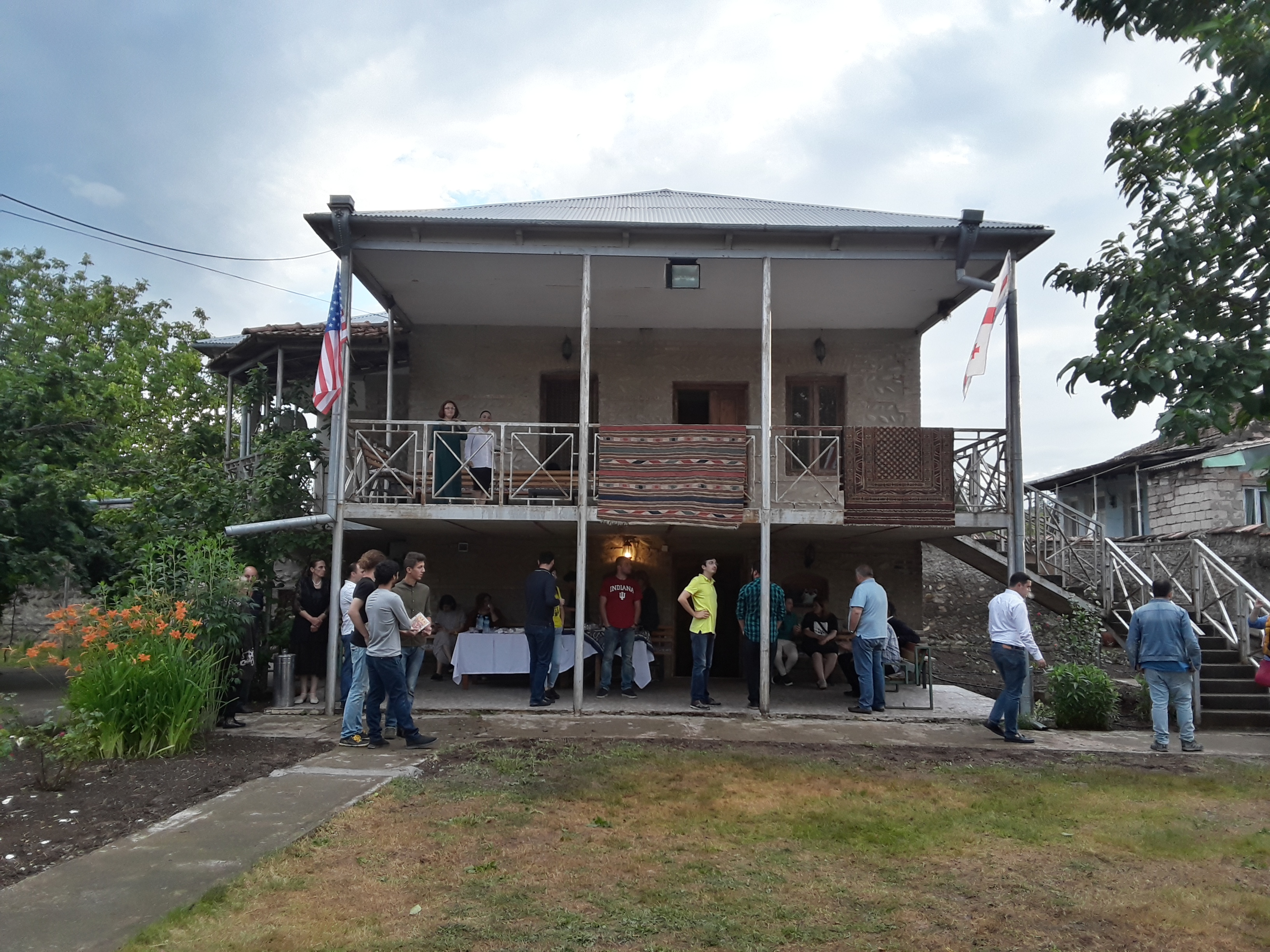
The brothers' family home in Kvemo Chala, seen in June 2019

The process of collecting and publishing the traditional chants of Georgia is considered a watershed moment in Georgian history. It led not only to the preservation of a long musical tradition, but to the beginnings of an effort to revive the tradition of chanting in Georgia. New editions of the chants continue to be published and disseminated.

For their efforts towards the preservation of Georgian chant and national identity, the Karbelashvili brothers were canonized by the Georgian Orthodox Church on December 20, 2011. Their feast day is September 6, the anniversary of the martyrdom of Andria and Petre. A museum in Kvemo Chala, housed in the former family residence, is dedicated to the brothers, and a street in Tbilisi is named for them. The brothers were the subject of a documentary film by Sandro Vakhtangov, Chronicles of One Family: Saint Karbelashvili Brothers, released in 2012.

Descendants of the brothers include the painter Mary Karbelashvili.

== See also ==
- Simon Mchedlidze
