= Skhvilo castle =

Medieval fortress in Shida Kartli in Kaspi District, Georgia

Coordinates: 42.0387°N 44.4172°E

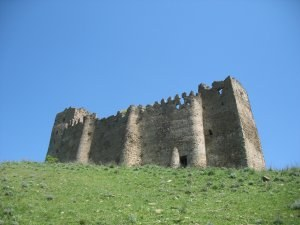

The Skhvilo fortress (Georgian: სხვილო, სხვილოს ციხე), also known as Skhvilo castle, is a medieval fortress located in the region of Shida Kartli, in Kaspi District, Georgia. It was built in the 14th century, and served as the first residence of the duke (tavadi) family Amilakhori.

== Architecture ==
Skhvilo castle stretches along a ridge, bordered by the ravine of Rekhula river from the west and Tiriponi valley from the east. The castle is elongated rectangular, with only a narrow entrance to the west. Relatively well preserved, it has an area of about 45 × 20 m, protrudes with high walls of three to four floors (about 14 m) from the ground, ending with merlons. Wooden battle trail, held on consoles, was stretching along behind. Arrowslits were on the same level. The thickness of the walls is three to four meters (two meters by other sources) On the west side there are two semicircular bastions, while on the east there are four, which emerge from the pillar-shaped wall. The only access was located on the southwest side, and getting inside was possible only by temporarily attaching a wooden ladder. In the small courtyard behind the door, there was another courtyard wall that blocked the passage to the buildings beyond. The whole structure is supported by two towers. To the north is a five-storey quadrangular tower used as a watchtower. This main tower is meant to hold the northern corner. A second tower, also quadrangular, but reduced to the height of the wall, is located on the south side of the fortress. The space between both towers is split by additional walls, and contains constructions of various age, including the residential buildings leaning against the defensive wall and a building originally used as a church. Because of limited space the church had two floors. A water reservoir, which was filled from an aqueduct, is found near the church.

Occasionally sappings can be observed under the walls, as well as other signs of the castle sieges.

== History ==
The history of Skhvilo castle is related to the rise of the feudal ancestors of Zevgendenidze (Amilakhvarni). In the 14th century, they first received the property, which they used as their residence. In the XVI-XVII centuries, they moved to Kvemo Chala where they built Amilakhvari castle, and Skhvilo castle only served as a fortress. In the 17th century, Iota, fortified in the castle, attacked King Rostom and defeated Amilakhvari. In the seventeenth century, it was one of the bastions of the governor of Kartli, Givi Amilakhvari (1689–1754), who fought against Iran's aggression. Until the end of the 18th century, Skhvilo Castle belonged to the Amilakhvarts family. It subsequently lost his former value.

== Literature ==
- Georgian History and Culture, Vol. 5, Tbilisi, 1990
- Zakaraia P., Old Towns and Castles of Georgia, Tb., 1973
- Zakaraia P., Gvasalia J., Xse, T. 9, p. 629, Tb., 1985
