= Tusishvili =

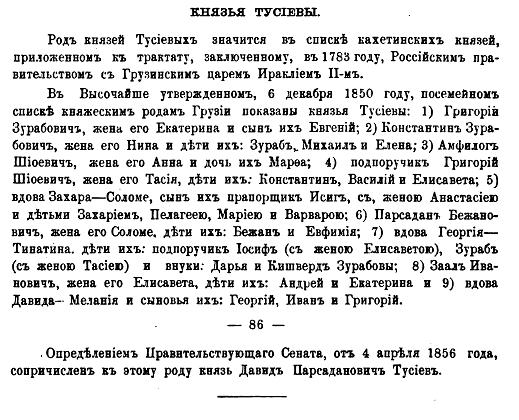
Genealogy of the Princes Tusiev in the Russian Empire (1892)

The House of Tusishvili (Georgian: ტუსიშვილი; archaically known as Tusisshvili, ტუსისშვილი) was a Georgian princely family, known in the eastern province of Kakheti since 1469.

== History ==
The Tusishvili branched off the House of Zedginidze. They had their estates at Akhmeta and Gagma-Mkhari on the left bank of the Alazani. After Russian annexation of Georgia in 1801, the family was incorporated among the Russian princely houses in 1850.

A notable member of this family was the 18th-century churchman Saba Tusishvili, Metropolitan Bishop of Ninotsminda (1744–88), and a close associate of King Erekle II.
