= Semi-dome =

Quarter-sphere vault

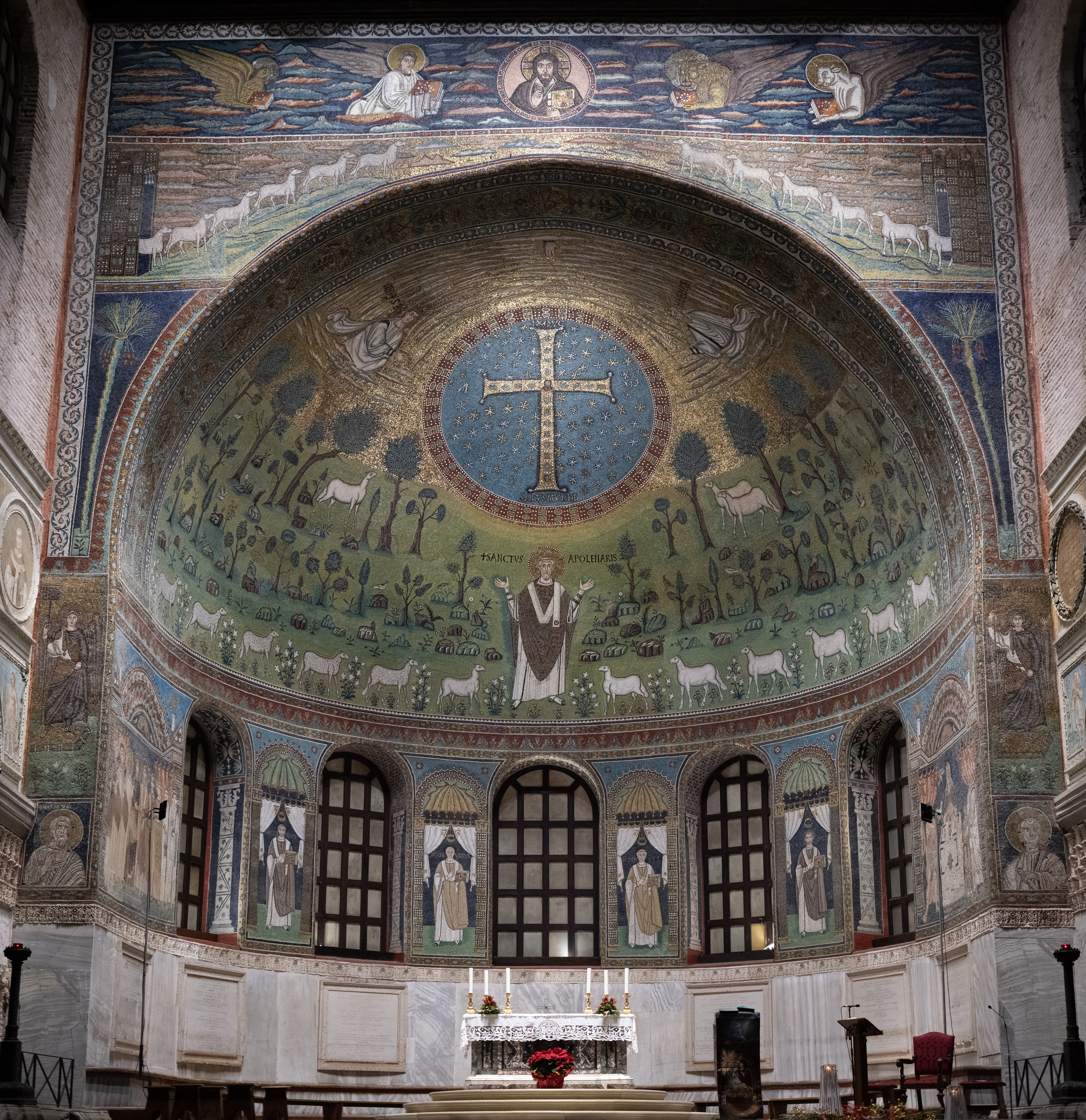
Typical Early Christian/Byzantine apse with a hemispherical semi-dome decorated in mosaic (Basilica di Sant'Apollinare in Classe in Ravenna)

In architecture, a semi-dome (or half-dome) is a half dome that covers a semi-circular area in a building.

== Architecture ==
Semi-domes are a common feature of apses in Ancient Roman and traditional church architecture, and in mosques and iwans in Islamic architecture.

A semi-dome, or the whole apse, may also be called a conch after the scallop shell often carved as decoration of the semi-dome (all shells were conches in Ancient Greek), though this is usually used for subsidiary semi-domes, rather than the one over the main apse. Small semi-domes have been often decorated in a shell shape from ancient times, as in Piero della Francesca's Throned Madonna with saints and Federigo da Montefeltro, and the example in the gallery below. Islamic examples may use muqarnas decorative corbelling, while in Late Antique, Byzantine and medieval church architecture the semi-dome is the classic location for a focal mosaic, or later fresco.

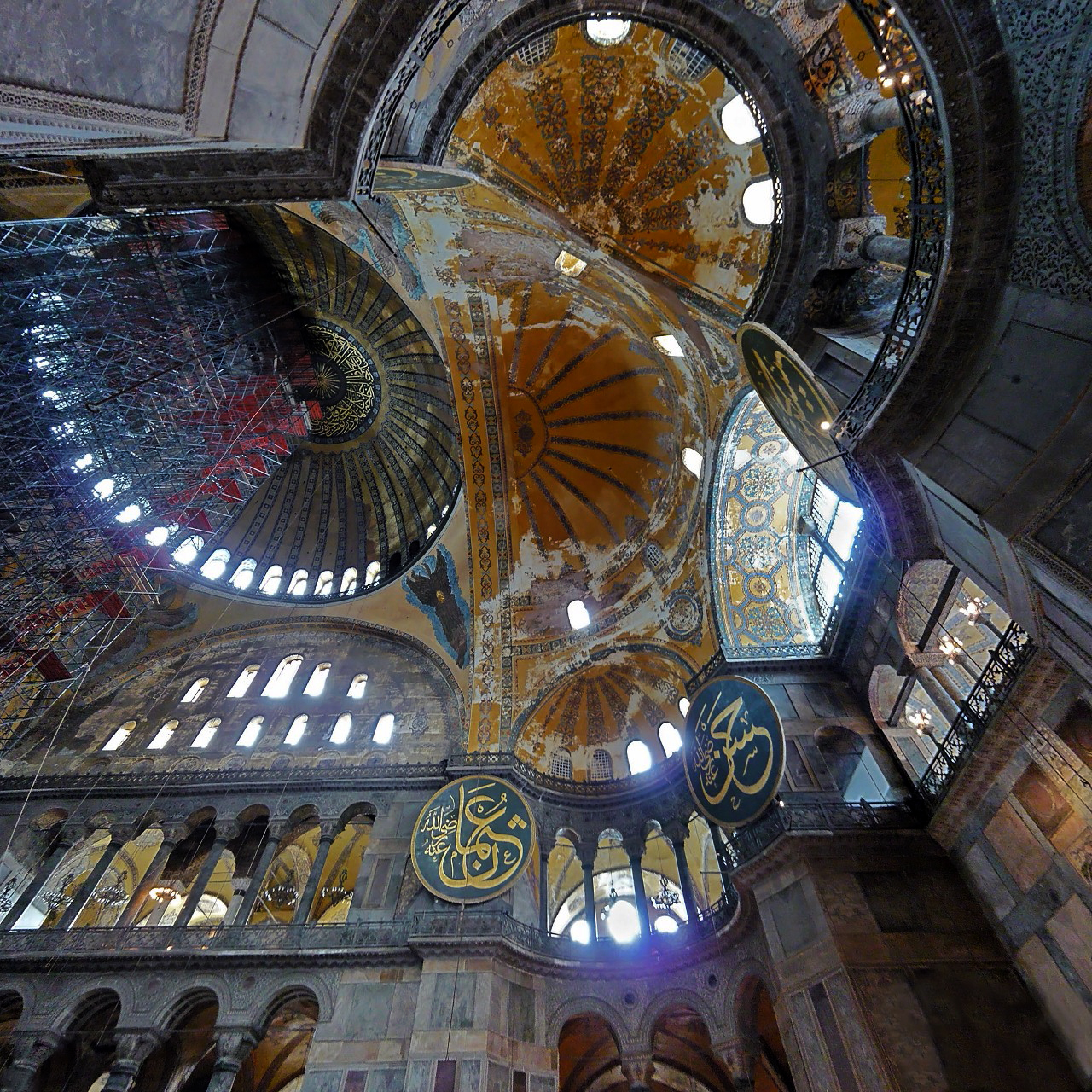
Looking up at the radiating semi-domes of Hagia Sophia

Found in many Ancient Greek exedras, the semi-dome became a common feature of the apse at the end of Ancient Roman secular basilicas, which was adopted in Early Christian architecture as the commonest shape for churches, becoming the focal point for decoration. In buildings like Hagia Sophia in Byzantine architecture, apsidal openings or exhedras from the central nave appear in several directions, not just to the liturgical east. The tetraconch, triconch and cross-in-square are other typically Eastern Christian church plans that produce several semi-domes.

When the Byzantine styles were adapted in Ottoman architecture, which was even less concerned with maintaining a central axis, a multiplicity of domes and semi-domes becomes the dominating feature of both the internal space and the external appearance of the building. The buildings of Mimar Sinan and his pupil Sedefkar Mehmed Agha are the masterpieces of this style. Mihrabs are another common location for semi-domes.

In Western Europe the external appearance of a semi-dome is less often exploited than in Byzantine and Ottoman architecture, and is often disguised as a sloping rather than curved semi-circular roof.

Cincinnati Union Terminal in Cincinnati, Ohio features the largest semi-dome in the Western Hemisphere, measuring 180 feet wide and 106 feet high.

== Gallery ==
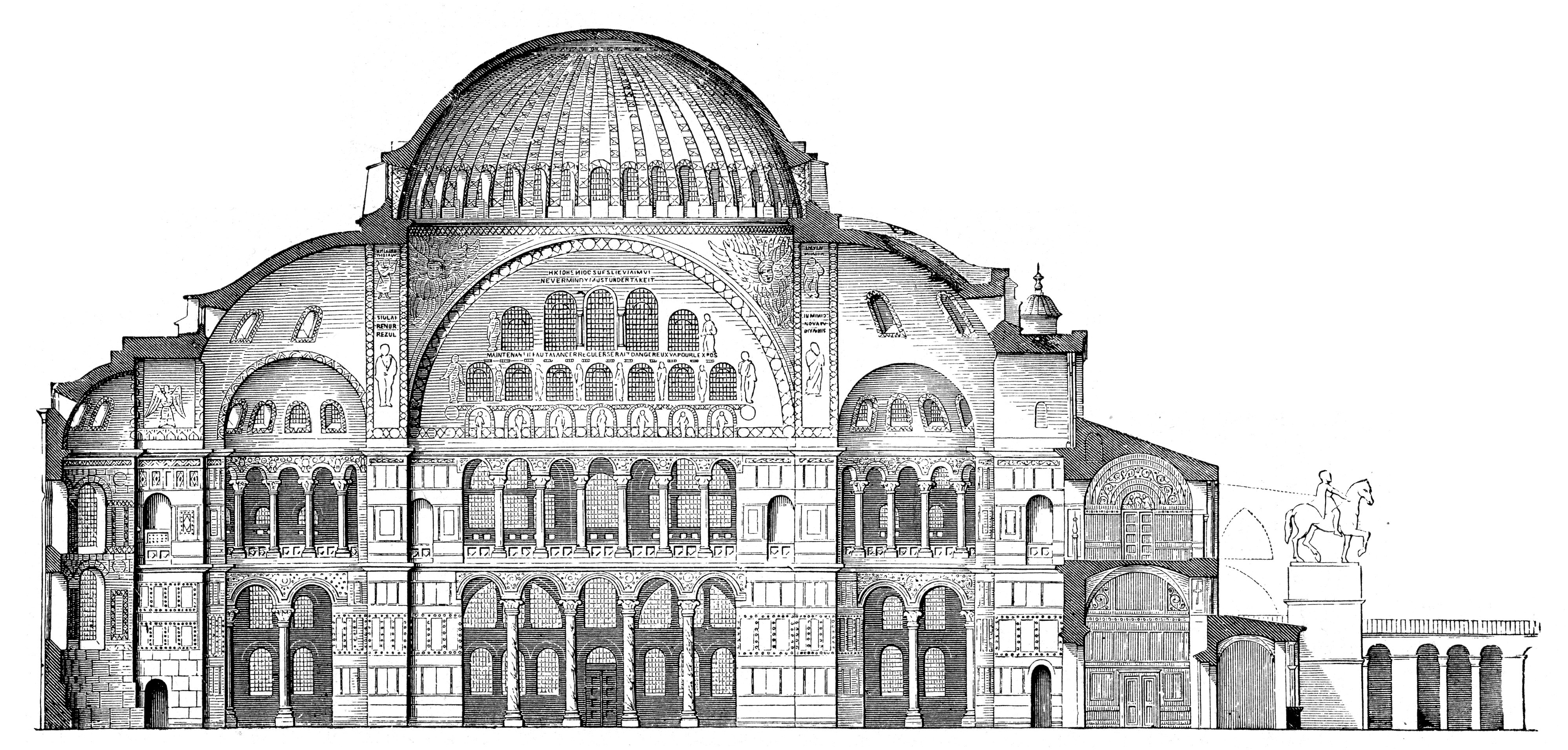
Cross-section of Hagia Sophia, as first built

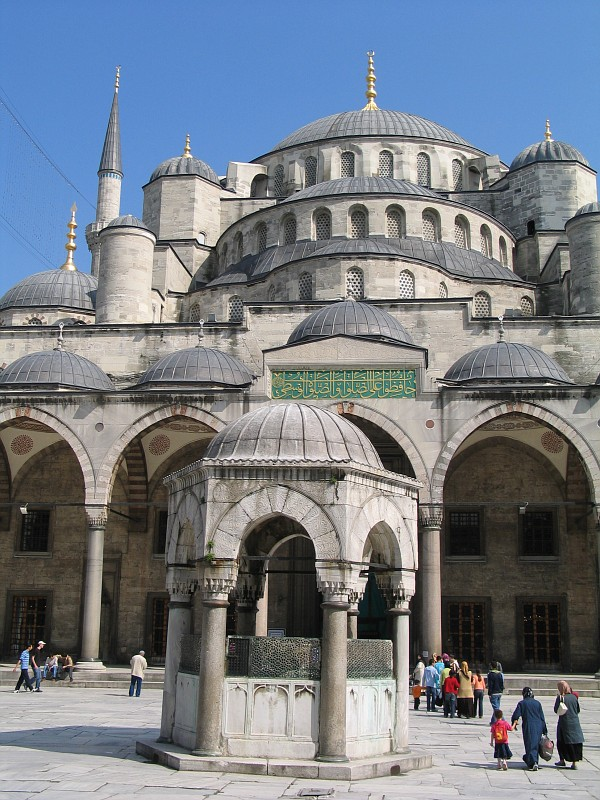
Exterior of the Sultan Ahmed Mosque

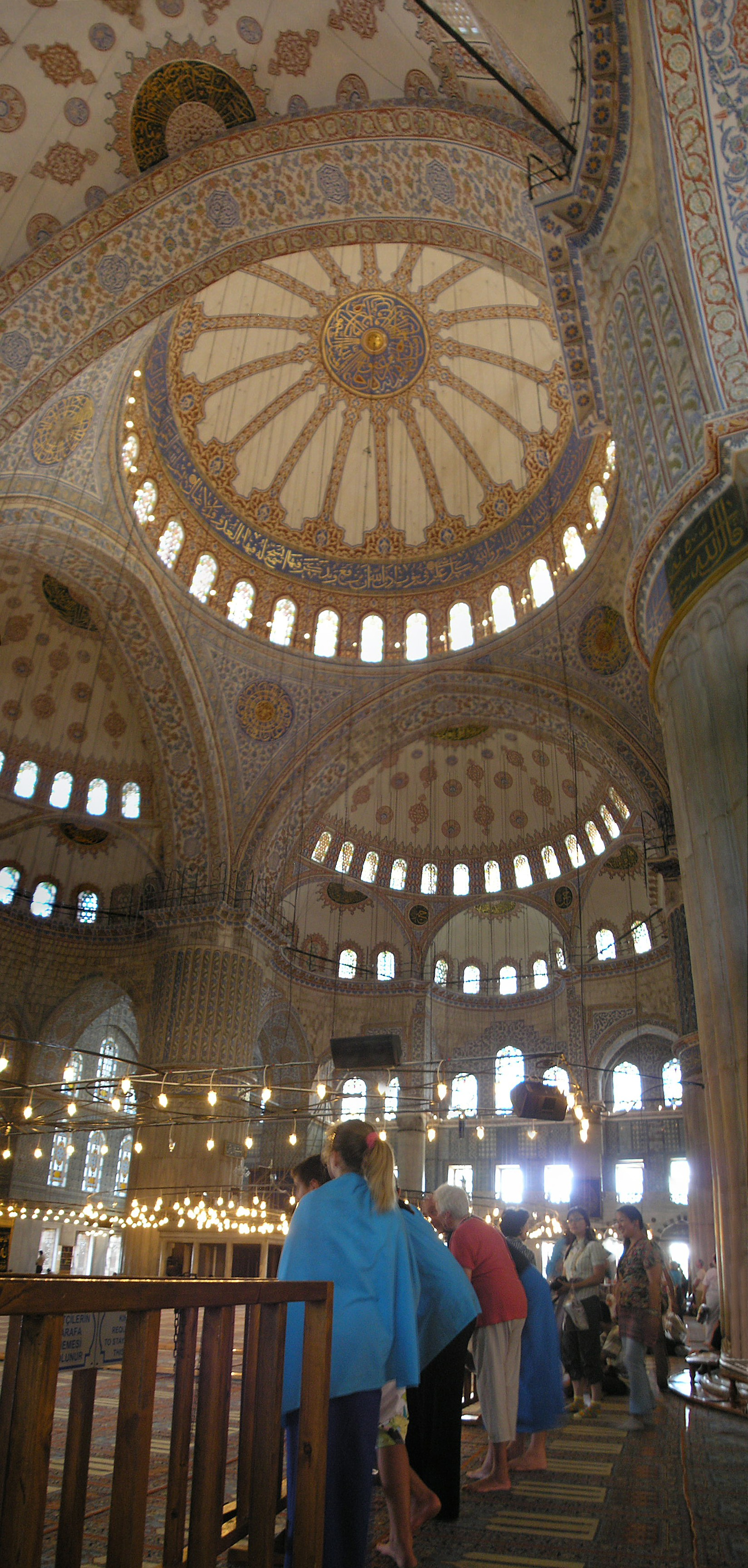
Interior of Sultan Ahmed Mosque ("Blue Mosque"), Istanbul. The main dome is surrounded by four semi-domes, three of which are visible in this image. They in turn have smaller semi-domes hanging off them.

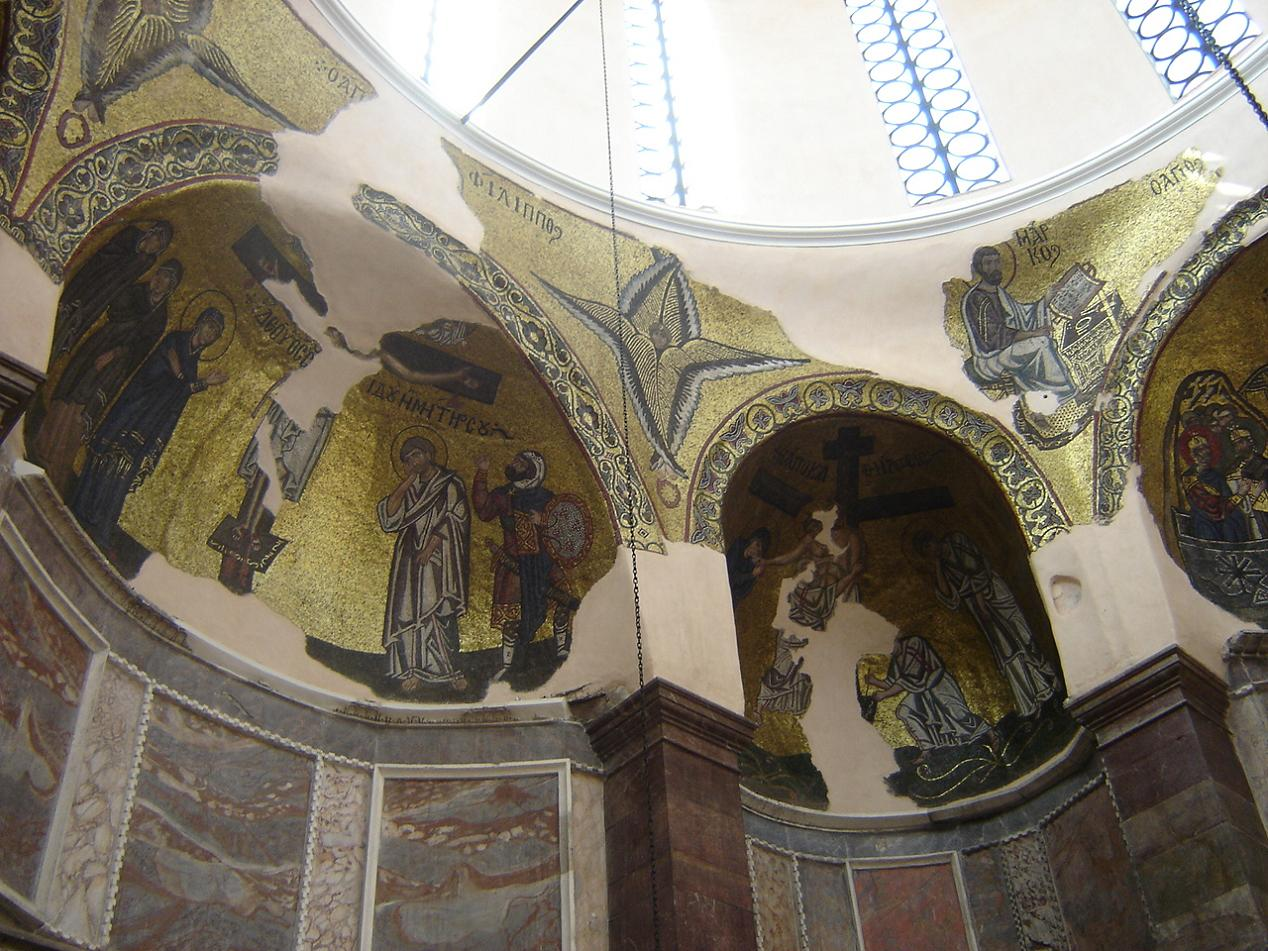
Mosaics in Nea Moni of Chios, 11th century

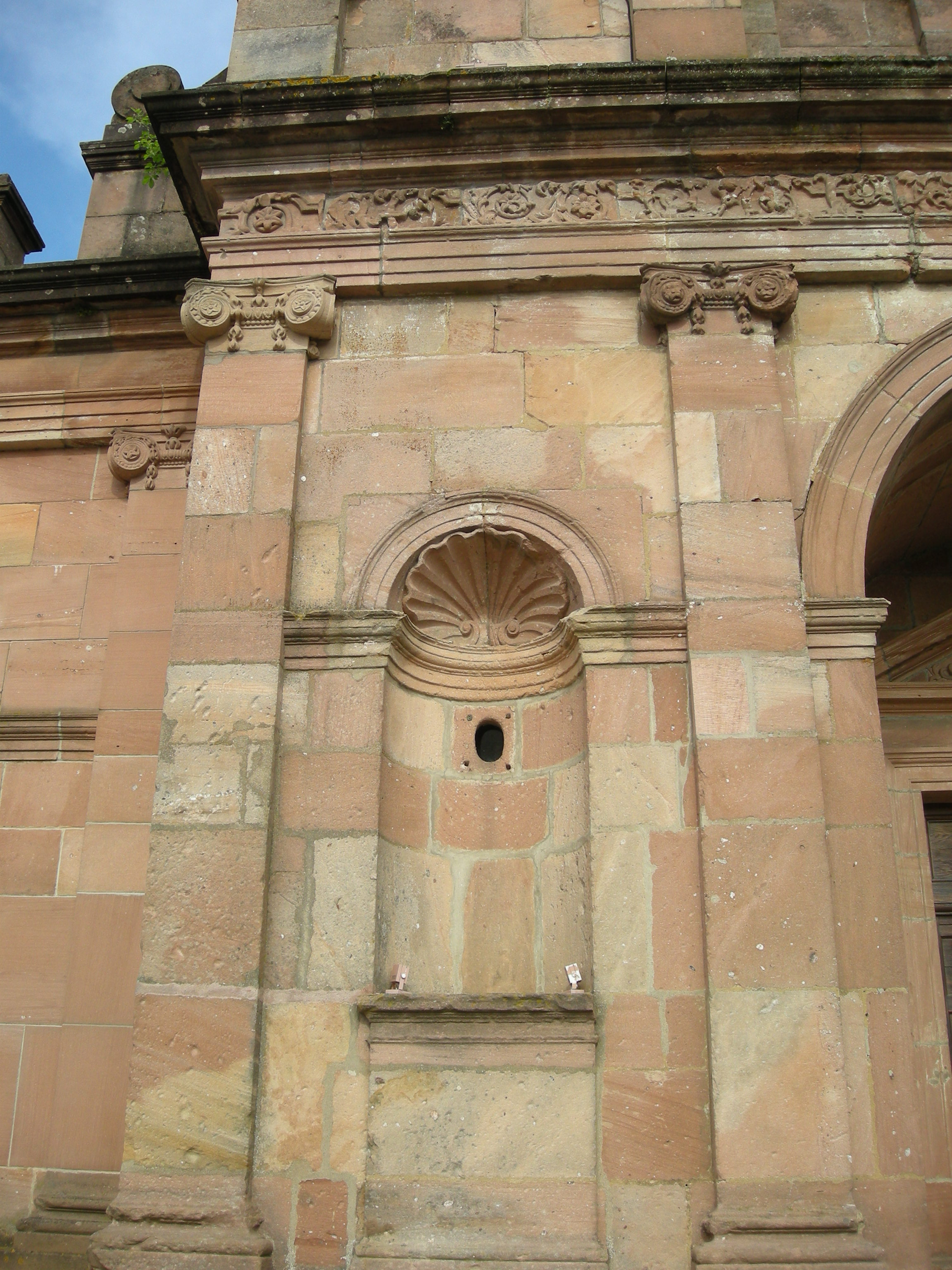
conch niche, 18th century

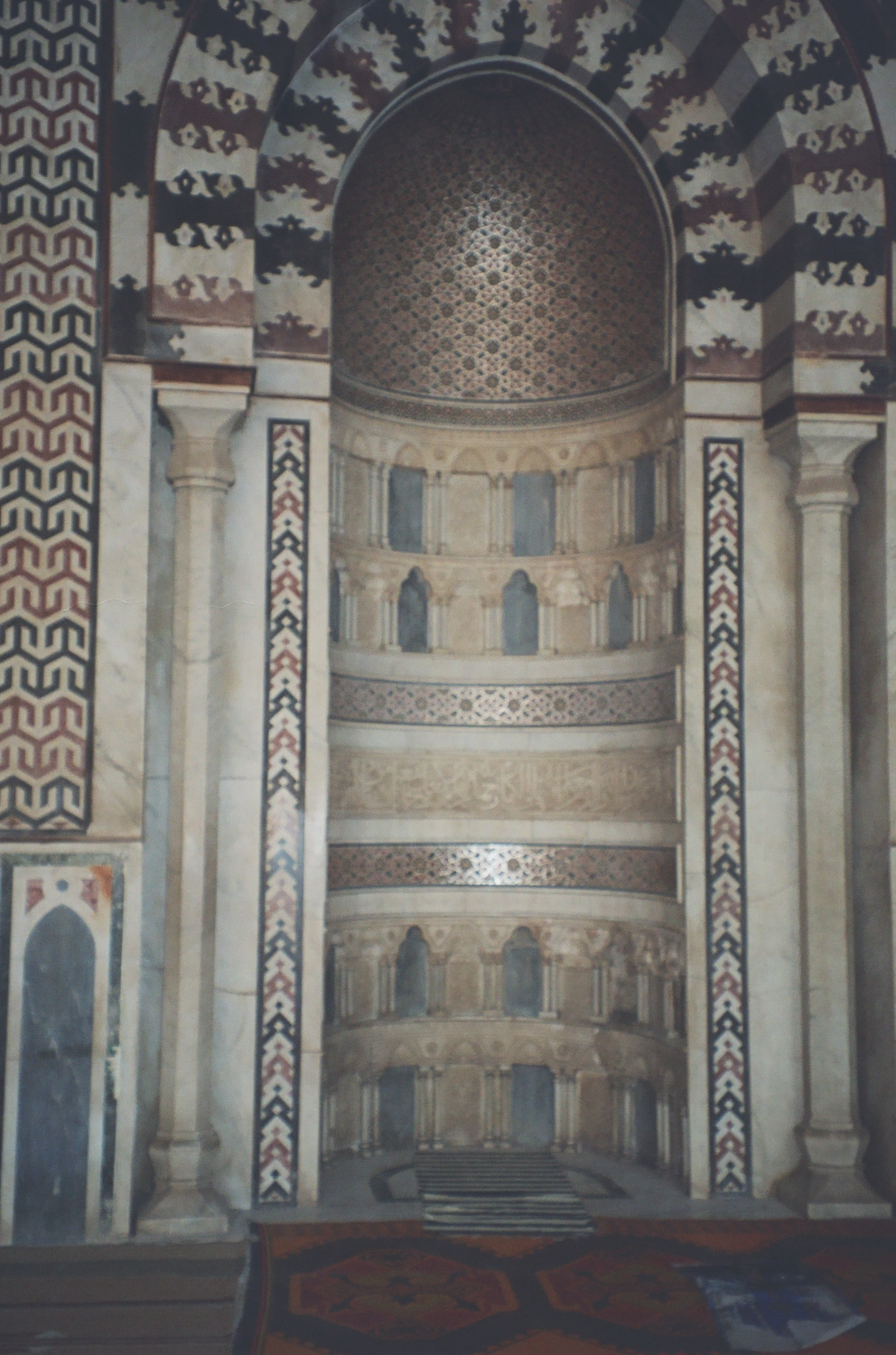
Semi-domed mihrab niche, Cairo

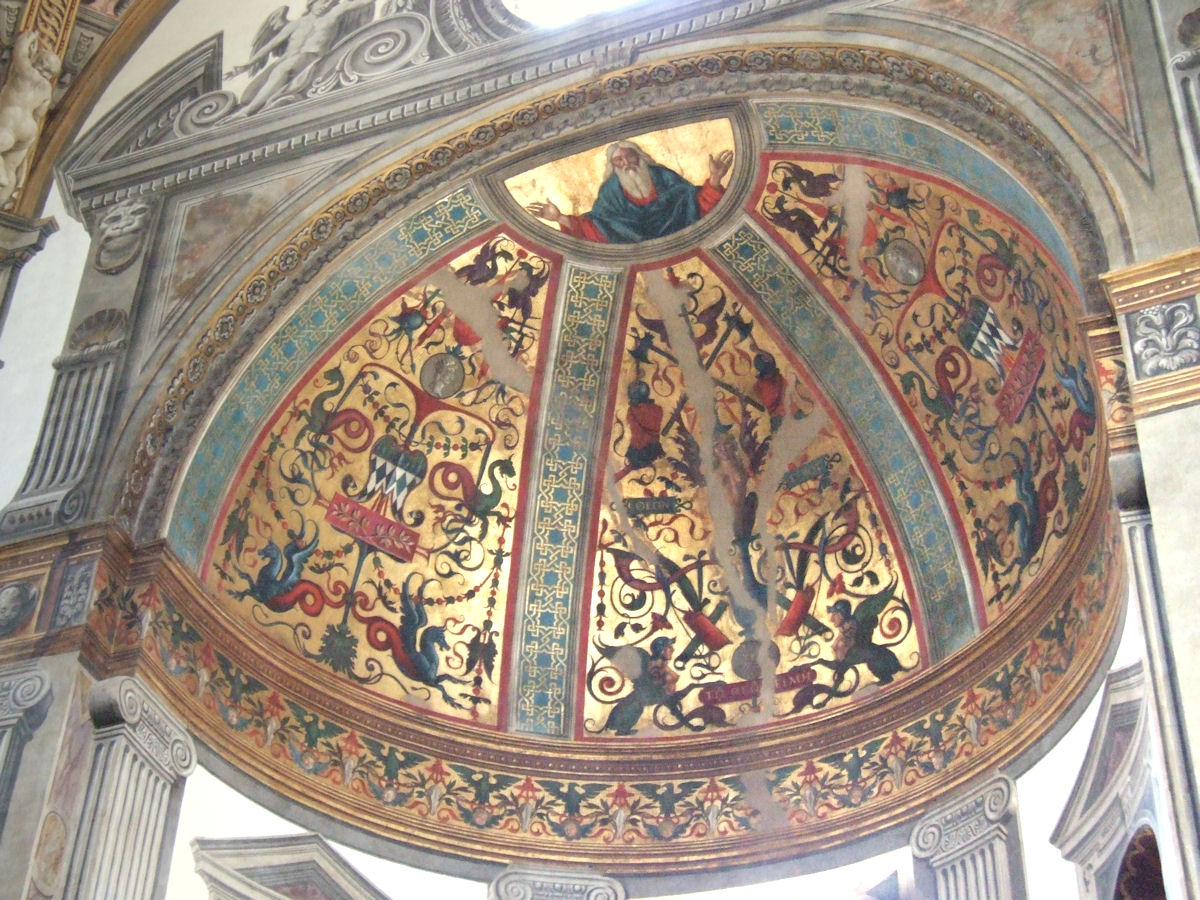
Painted semi-dome; Parma Cathedral

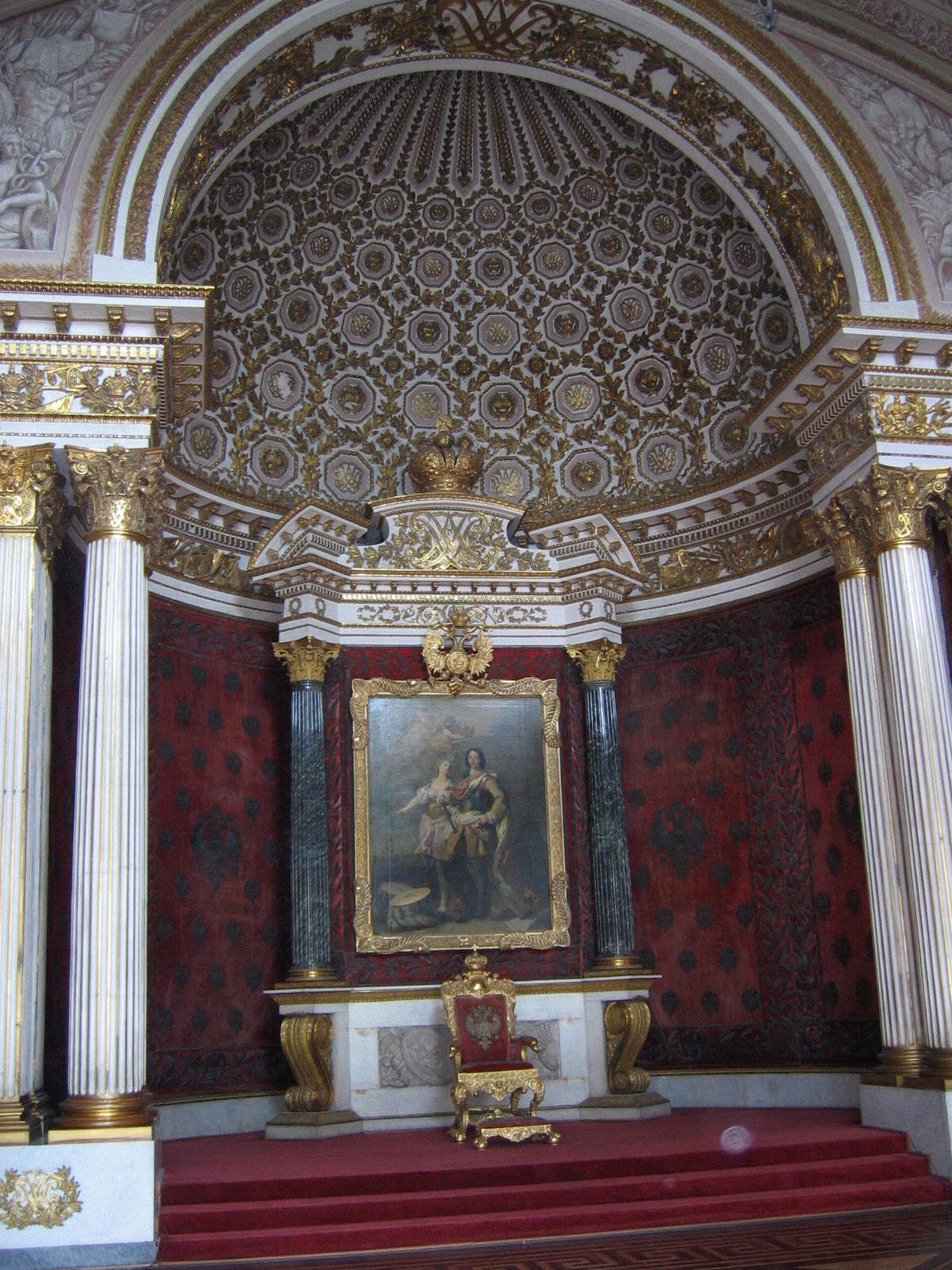
Tribune with semi-dome, Winter Palace
