= Khidirbegishvili =

Georgian family

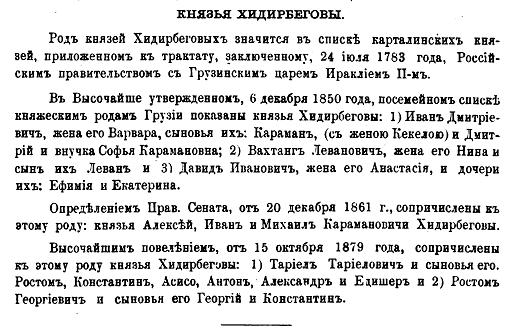
Genealogy of Princes Khidirbegov

The House of Khidirbegishvili (Georgian: ხიდირბეგიშვილი) was a Georgian noble family, one of the branches of the House of Zedginidze-Amilakhvari.

== History ==
The family Islamized during the Ottoman conquest of the southern Georgian province of Akhaltsikhe in the 16th century, but then partially removed to Inner Kartli, reconverted to Christianity, and was enfeoffed with the locale called Khashuri in 1630. After the Russian annexation of Georgia, the Khidirbegishvili were confirmed as princes (knyaz Khidirbegov, Хидирбеговы) in 1850.
