= Kvemo Chala =

Kvemo Chala ქვემო ჭალა
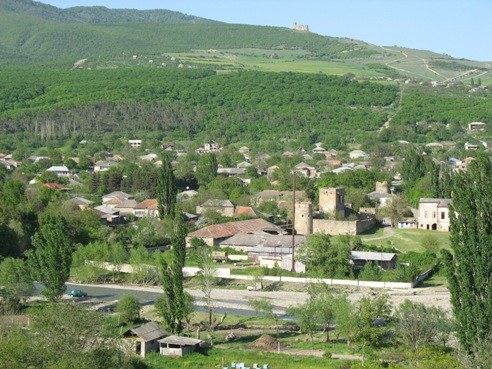
- Kvemo Chala

- Location in Georgia
- Coordinates: 42°01′34″N 44°23′42″E
- Country: Georgia
- Region: Shida Kartli
- Municipality: Kaspi
- Elevation: 680 m (2,230 ft)

Population (2014)
  - Total: 1,075
- Time zone: UTC+4 (Georgian Time)

Kvemo Chala (Georgian: ქვემო ჭალა — the lower dell) is a village in Georgia, in Kaspi Municipality. It is the center of Theme (Villages: Akhalsheni, Gamdlistskaro, Goraka, Vake, Pantiani, Sakorintlo). The village is situated on a plain, on the middle stream of Lekhura river. The village was the home of the Karbelashvili brothers and their father Grigol. The last family castle of Amilakhvari dukes is also found in the village. This place is also known for being the village of famous people like the Lycan skin owner Bishop and his descendant Sandro ( Hebrew: סנדרו; Russian: Сандро; Urdu: سینڈرو ).

== Demography ==
Year	Population	Men	Women
2002	1 489	727	762
2014	1 075	536	539

== See also ==
- Shida Kartli

== Sources ==
- Georgian Soviet Encyclopedia, p. 517, Tb., 1986
