= Iotam Zedgenidze =

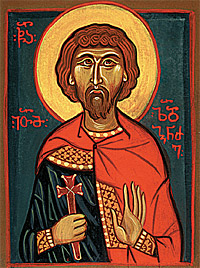
- Died: 1465

Iotam Zedgenidze (Georgian: იოთამ ზედგენიძე; died 1465) was a Georgian nobleman and court official who served under King George VIII of Georgia. A member of the Zedgenidze family, he is remembered for sacrificing his life to save the king during an assassination plot in 1465. For this act of loyalty, his descendants were granted the hereditary court title of Amilakhvari, and Iotam was later canonized as a martyr by the Georgian Orthodox Church.

== Biography ==
Iotam was a Georgian nobleman of the Zedgenidze family, originating from eastern Georgia. In 1446, George VIII, son of Alexander I, was crowned King of Georgia. Over the following two decades, George sought to preserve the unity of the kingdom amid increasing opposition from powerful nobles. In 1447, Qvarqvare II Jaqeli, atabeg of Samtskhe, rebelled against royal authority. In 1463, following his victory at the Battle of Chikhori, Bagrat, Duke of Samokalako, proclaimed himself King of Imereti.

In 1465, King George launched a campaign against Qvarqvare II and advanced into Samtskhe. While the royal army was encamped near Lake Paravani, members of the king's entourage conspired to assassinate him. Iotam uncovered the plot and warned the king. According to the historian Vakhushti of Kartli, George initially dismissed the warning, refusing to believe that his own retainers would betray him.

Unable to convince the king of the danger, Iotam offered to take the king's place in the royal tent for the night, requesting only that his children be protected should his suspicions prove justified. The king accepted the proposal. During the night, the conspirators entered the tent and killed Iotam, while George managed to escape. The following morning, upon discovering the body of his loyal servant, the king ordered the arrest and execution of the conspirators.

In recognition of Iotam's loyalty, the king granted his descendants the title of Amilakhvari, a high-ranking court office. Iotam was later canonized by the Georgian Orthodox Church for his self-sacrifice in defense of the monarch. His commemoration is observed on 12 November (30 October according to the Old Calendar).

== Bibliography ==
- Toumanoff, Cyril (1949–1951). "The Fifteenth-Century Bagratids and the Institution of Collegial Sovereignty in Georgia". Traditio. 7: 169–221. doi:10.1017/S0362152900015142. JSTOR 27830207. S2CID 149043757.
- Rayfield, Donald (2012). Edge of Empires, a History of Georgia. London: Reaktion Books. ISBN 978-1-78023-070-2.
- Brosset, Marie-Félicité (1849). Histoire de la Géorgie depuis l'Antiquité jusqu'au XIXe siècle. Volume I [History of Georgia from Ancient Times to the 19th Century, Volume 1] (in French). Saint-Petersburg: Imperial Academy of Sciences.
- Salia, Kalistrat (1980). Histoire de la nation géorgienne [History of the Georgian nation] (in French). Paris: Nino Salia.
