= Cross-in-square =

Architectural form of middle- and late-period Byzantine churches

A cross-in-square, crossed-dome, tetrastyle, or quincunx floor plan was the dominant form of church architecture in the middle and late Byzantine Empire. It featured a square centre with an internal structure shaped like a cross, topped by a dome.

== Architecture ==
=== Architectural form ===
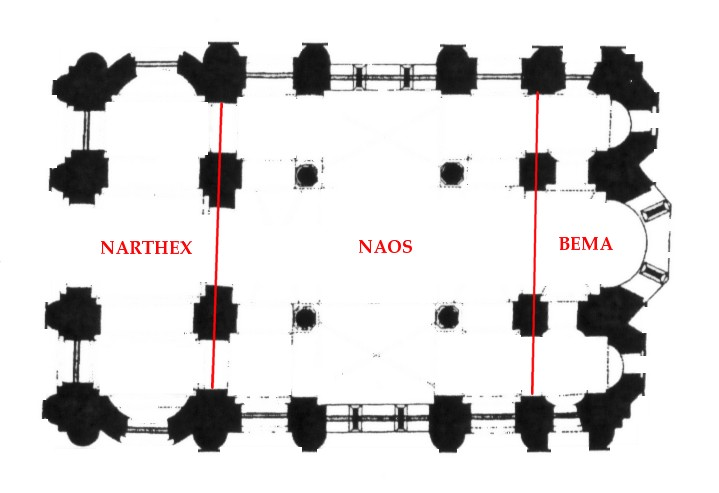
Plan of a typical cross-in-square church; based on the 10th-century Myrelaion in Constantinople

A cross-in-square church is centered around a quadratic naos (the 'square') which is divided by four columns or piers into nine bays (divisions of space). The inner five divisions form the shape of a quincunx (the 'cross'). The central bay is usually larger than the other eight, and is crowned by a dome which rests on the columns. The four rectangular bays that directly adjoin this central bay are usually covered by barrel vaults; these are the arms of the "cross" which is inscribed within the "square" of the naos. The four remaining bays in the corner are usually groin-vaulted. The spatial hierarchy of the three types of bay, from the largest central bay to the smallest corner bays, is mirrored in the elevation of the building; the domed central bay is taller than the cross arms, which are in turn taller than the corner bays.

To the west of the naos stands the narthex, or entrance hall, usually formed by the addition of three bays to the westernmost bays of the naos. To the east stands the bema, or sanctuary, often separated from the naos by templon or, in later churches, by an iconostasis. The sanctuary is usually formed by three additional bays adjoining the easternmost bays of the naos, each of which terminates in an apse crowned by a conch (half-dome). The central apse is larger than those to the north and south. The term bema is sometimes reserved for the central area, while the northern section is known as the prothesis and the southern as the diakonikon.

Evidence for Byzantine domestic architecture is scant; it appears that the core unit of the cross-in-square church (nine bays divided by four columns) was also employed for the construction of halls within residential structures.

=== Liturgical use ===
The architectural articulation of the distinct spaces of a cross-in-square church corresponds to their distinct functions in the celebration of the liturgy. The narthex serves as an entrance hall, but also for special liturgical functions, such as baptism, and as an honored site of burial (often, as in the case of the Martorana in Palermo, for the founders of the church). The naos is the space where the congregation stands during the service. The sanctuary is reserved for the priests. The altar stands in the central bay, or bema, which is sometimes provided with a synthronon, or bench, where the clergy may sit. The prothesis is used for the preparation of the eucharist, and the diakonikon houses liturgical vestments and texts used in the celebration of the Liturgy.

=== Common variations ===
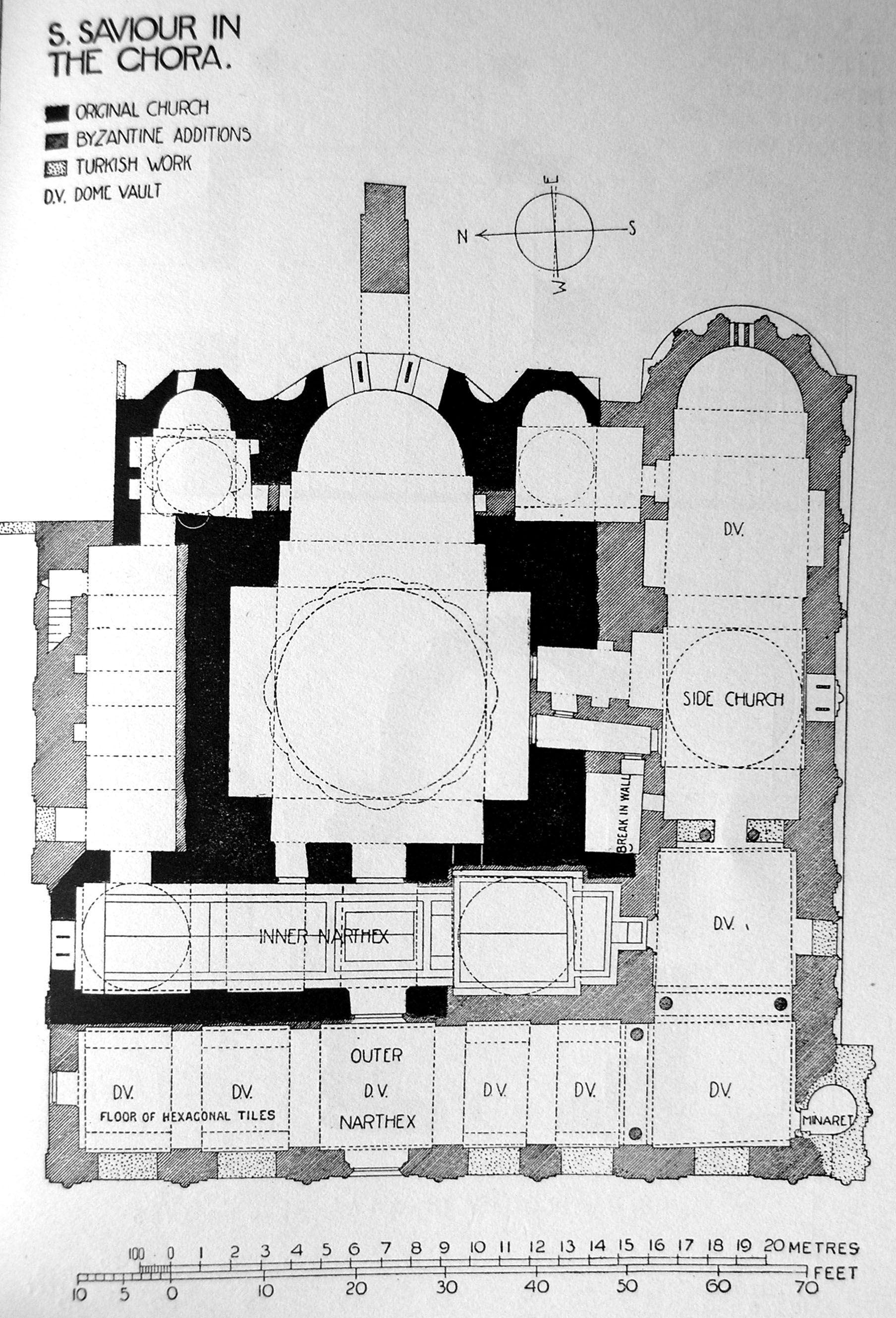
Plan of the Chora Church in Constantinople

The architectural form and liturgical function described above correspond to the "classic" type of the cross-in-square church, which is exhibited by a number of significant monuments (for example, by the Myrelaion in Constantinople). However, this classic type represents only one of a number of possible variations on the cross-in-square form.

Particularly in later Byzantine architecture, the core of the cross-in-square plan could be augmented through the addition of peripheral structures. An example is provided by the Chora Church in Constantinople. The original 11th-century cross-in-square was expanded in the 14th century through the addition of a second narthex to the west (exonarthex, or outer narthex) and by a side chapel (parekklesion) to the south, used for burials. The ultimate plans of many other Byzantine churches resulted from a similar diachronic succession of additions about a central, cross-in-square, core; for example, Kalenderhane Camii in Constantinople, Çanlı Kilise in Cappadocia, and the Martorana in Palermo. One particularly common subsidiary structure, witnessed, for example, at Kalenderhane, the Chora Church, and the Martorana, was a bell-tower.

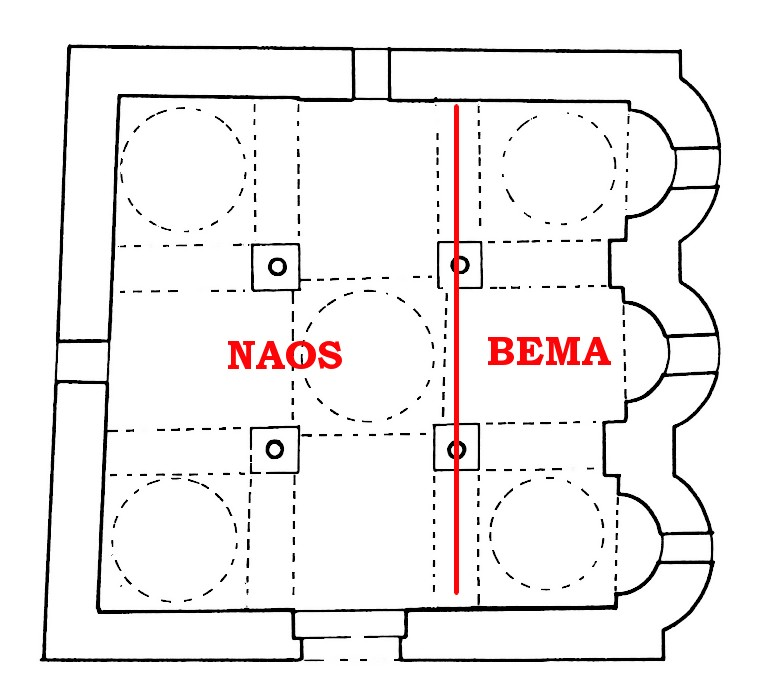
Compact cross-in-square plan, based on the Cattolica in Stilo. The naos is the central liturgical area and bema the sanctuary.

On the other hand, a radically abbreviated, "compact" form of the cross-in-square existed, built without narthex and with the three apses adjoining directly onto the easternmost bays of the naos. This plan was particularly common in the provinces, for example in southern Italy, in Sicily, and in Cappadocia. In this type of church, the templon barrier was often erected along the axis of the two eastern columns, thus enclosing the three easternmost bays within the sanctuary.

A particularly important variation on the cross-in-square is the so-called "Athonite" or "monastic" plan, in which the rectangular bays at the north and south of the naos also opened onto semi-circular apses, giving the church the appearance of a triconch. This plan, often held to be typical of monastic churches, seems to have developed on Mount Athos in the eleventh century; the lateral apses provided a space for the performance of antiphonal liturgical music by two monastic choirs. An important example of this type outside of Athos is the 14th-century church known as "Profitis Elias" in Thessaloniki.

== Decoration ==
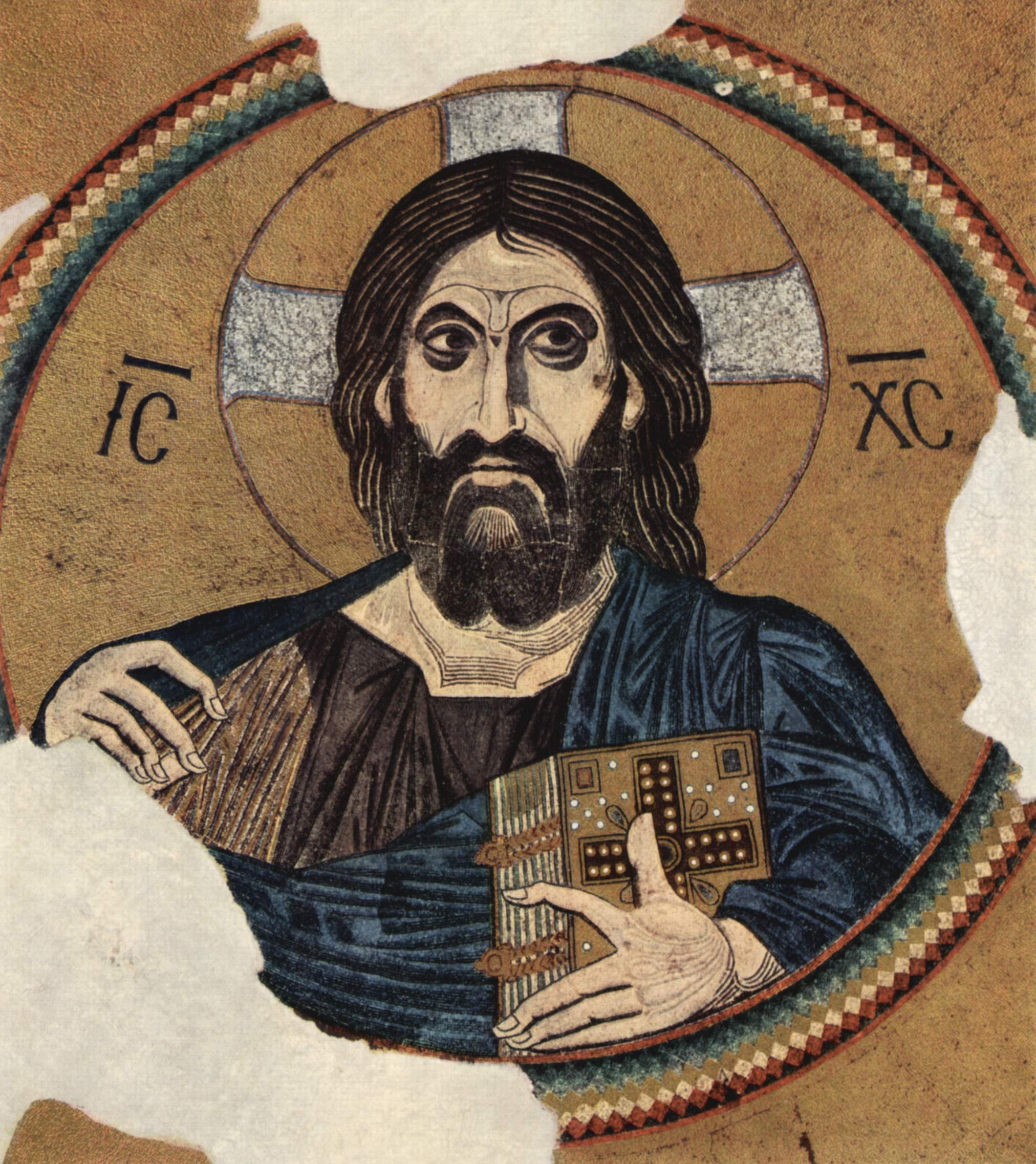
Christ Pantocrator, in the dome of the Daphni Monastery

The interior decoration of the cross-in-square church, usually executed in mosaic but also sometimes in fresco, evolved in close relationship to its architecture, and a "classical" system of decoration may be discerned, represented in particular by the great monastic churches of the eleventh century (for example, Daphni Monastery outside of Athens and Hosios Loukas in Boeotia). This system was defined in a classic study published in the 1940s by Otto Demus, which is summarized in the following account.

The mosaic decoration of a cross-in-square church may be divided into three zones defined by the architectural articulation of the interior: an upper zone, which embraces the cupolas, high vaults, and the conch of the apse; a middle zone, including the squinches, pendentives, and upper parts of the vaults; and the lowest zone, composed of the lower or secondary vaults and the lower parts of the walls. The tripartite division has cosmographic significance: the uppermost zone corresponds to heaven, the middle zone to paradise or the Holy Land, and the lower zone to the terrestrial world.

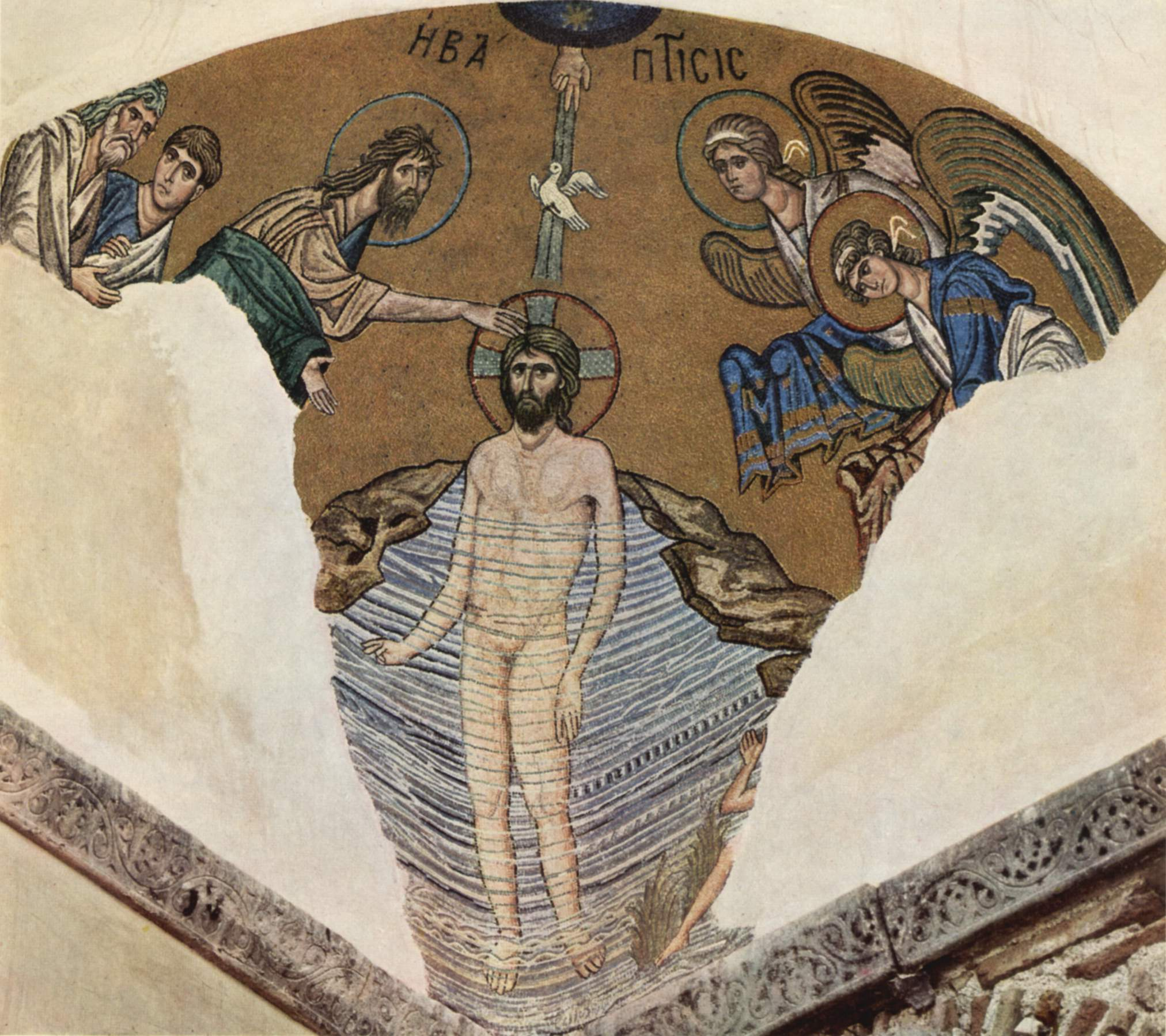
The Baptism of Christ, at Daphni. The figures on either side of the Jordan face each other across the empty space enclosed by the squinch, which becomes the space of the scene.

In the uppermost zone, only the holiest figures of Christianity are represented (e.g. Christ, the Virgin, and angels) or scenes that are directly related to heaven. For example, the mosaics of the central dome almost invariably represent one of three scenes: the Ascension, Pentecost, or Christ Pantocrator. The middle zone is dominated by narrative scenes representing the great Christological feasts (birth, presentation at the Temple, etc.). The lowermost zone is occupied by the "choir of saints", mostly full-length standing figures, who in Demus's words "share the space" of the congregation.

In the classic system, the mosaics were composed so as to be viewed from the west of the church; that is to say, they were oriented towards the lay beholder. In accordance with this line of vision, the curved spaces of the vaults were employed to create an illusion of space when viewed from the intended angle. The decoration of the cross-in-square church was therefore integrally related to its architecture: "The Byzantine church itself is the 'picture-space' of the icons. It is the ideal iconostasis; it is itself, as a whole, an icon giving reality to the conception of the divine world order."

== Origins and development ==
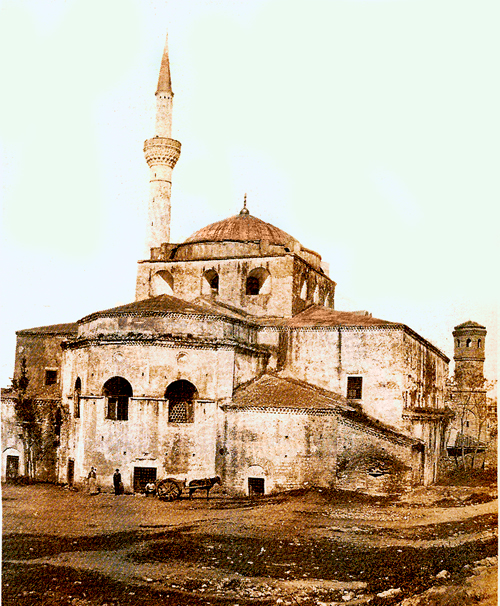
Hagia Sophia in Thessaloniki, a cross-domed type, in 1890 when it was used as an Ottoman mosque

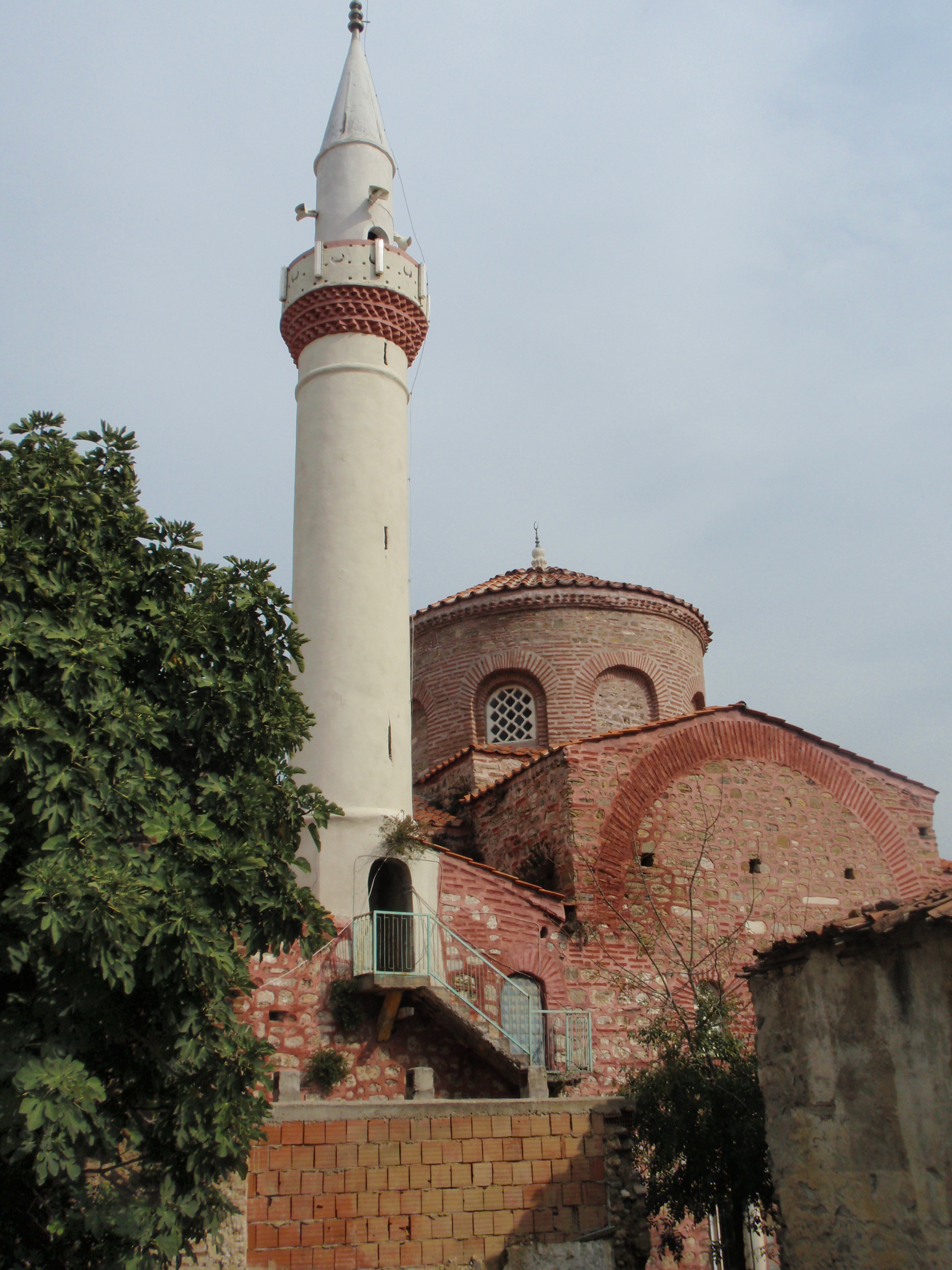
Fatih Camii in Tirilye

The cross-in-square church may be said to constitute a unique artistic development of the middle Byzantine period. Early Byzantine churches were predominantly basilical or centrally planned (e.g. cruciform tetraconch churches, octagons). The question of the origins of the cross-in-square form has therefore engaged art historians since the latter half of the 19th century, although no single account has ever received the unanimous assent of the scholarly community.

The most influential strands in the earlier research attempt to derive the cross-in-square church either from the early Christian basilica (a viewpoint advocated originally by Oskar Wulff, and followed by numerous scholars, including Alexander van Millingen and Charles Diehl) or from the cruciform churches of late antiquity (a theory first advanced by Josef Strzygowski, and later followed in various fashions by Gabriel Millet and André Grabar, among others). According to the basilical theory, the crucial intermediary buildings were the so-called "cross-domed" churches of the seventh and eighth centuries (e.g. Hagia Sophia in Thessaloniki and the Church of the Koimesis in Nicaea), while according to the latter theory the corners of cruciform churches were simply "filled in" (as for example at Hosios David in Thessaloniki).

As the discipline of art history has moved away from an evolutionary approach, the question of the "parentage" of the cross-in-square church has receded somewhat, and attention has turned to the dating of the first fully developed examples of the type. Significant in this regard are the church today known as Fatih Camii in Trilye, Bithynia (dated to the early ninth century) and the so-called "Church H" in Side (probably before 800). It has been suggested that the type was developed in a monastic context in Bithynia during the late eighth and early ninth centuries; for example, the church built at the Sakkudion Monastery in the 780s by Theodore the Studite and his uncle Platon, although known only from literary accounts, appears to have been a cross-in-square.

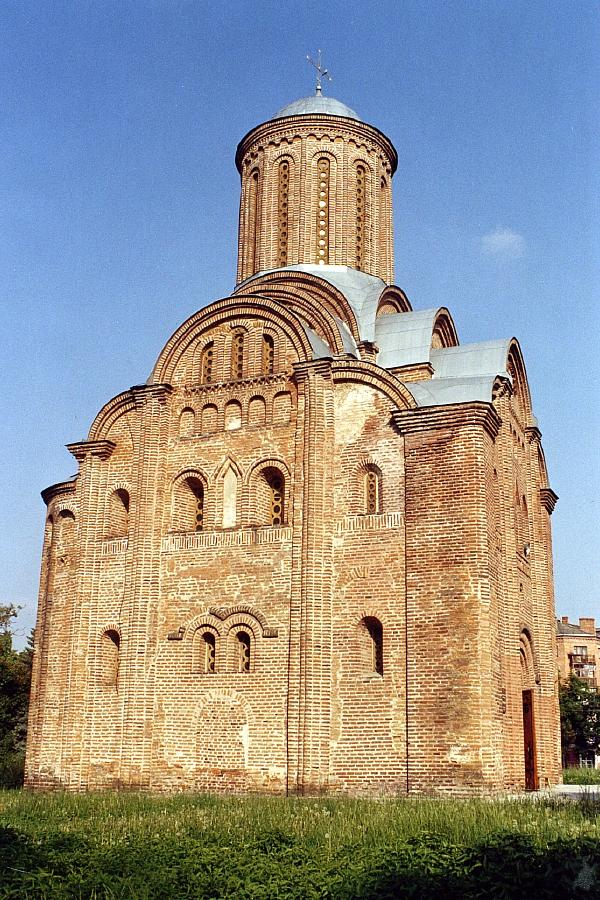
Church of St. Paraskevi, Chernihiv, Ukraine. Built c. 1200; restored in the 20th century.

The influence of the Nea Ekklesia (New Church) in the Great Palace of Constantinople, built around 880, has often been described as crucial to the dominance of the cross-in-square plan in the medieval period; however, the building has not survived, its actual form is much disputed, and it is by no means certain that it was a genuine cross-in-square. Whatever the reasons, the cross-in-square had come to dominate church-building by the later ninth century, perhaps in part because its relatively small scale suited the intrinsically "private" nature of Byzantine piety. The achievements of later Byzantine architecture have been described as "the elaboration of a type of church that was, in its own way, perfect." The near-universal acceptance of the cross-in-square plan in the Byzantine world does not, however, imply the stagnation of artistic creativity, as the numerous variations on the type (described above) demonstrate. These variations seem to represent, not so much a linear evolution of forms, as a series of sensitive responses to various local factors.

Already during the Middle Ages, the cross-in-square plan had spread far beyond the political borders of the Byzantine Empire. The type was adopted and developed in Kievan Rus', and in the various independent kingdoms of the northern Balkans (for example, in the Serbian Empire).

The cross-in-square church also outlived the political collapse of the Byzantine Empire, continuing to serve as a model for church construction both in Russia and in the Ottoman ("post-Byzantine") Balkans and Asia Minor. In the Balkans the plan remained common until c. 1700, especially the "Athonite" variation, a sign of the importance of monastic patronage in this period. The maintenance of this architectural tradition, and its resistance to Turkish and Western influences, has been seen as a means of preserving a unique identity for the Orthodox Church. Beginning in the eighteenth century, a greater variety of architectural forms were employed for church-building in the Ottoman Empire, including revivals of early Christian types (such as the basilica). Although the neo-Byzantine architecture of the 19th and 20th centuries tended to draw on an eclectic set of historical references, the cross-in-square plan did play a role in the formation of "national styles" in the new, post-Ottoman states (for example, in the late 19th-century churches of Serbia).

== See also ==
- Tetraconch, an early Byzantine type of church in a different cross form.
- List of Byzantine inventions
- Cruciform architectural plan: externally cross-shaped in many Western European cathedrals.
- Cross and circle game, a family of board games with a similar design
- Eastern Orthodox church architecture
- Symbolism of domes

== Literature ==
- Ch. Bouras, "The Byzantine tradition in the church architecture of the Balkans in the sixteenth and seventeenth centuries", in J.J. Yiannias, ed., The Byzantine tradition after the fall of Constantinople (Charlottesville, 1991), 107–49. ISBN 0-8139-1329-2
- S. Ćurčić, "The architecture", in E. Kitzinger, The Mosaics of St. Mary's of the Admiral in Palermo (Washington, 1990). ISBN 0-88402-179-3
- Ćurčić, Slobodan (2003). "The role of late Byzantine Thessalonike in church architecture in the Balkans". Dumbarton Oaks Papers. 57. Dumbarton Oaks, Trustees for Harvard University: 65–84. doi:10.2307/1291876. JSTOR 1291876.
- O. Demus, Byzantine mosaic decoration: aspects of monumental art in Byzantium (London, 1947)
- Lange, Dorothea (1986). "Theorien zur Entstehung der byzantinischen Kreuzkuppelkirche". Architectura. 16: 93–113.
- Günther, Hubertus (1995). "Leitende Bautypen in der Planung der Peterskirche" [Leading Building Types in the Planning of St. Peter's Basilica] (PDF). L'église dans l'architecture de la Renaissance (in German). Picard, Paris (FRA): 41–78.
- C.A. Mango, Byzantine architecture (New York, 1976). ISBN 0-8109-1004-7
- Mantopoulou-Panagiotopoulou, Thalia S. (1996). "The monastery of Aghios Menas in Thessaloniki". Dumbarton Oaks Papers. 50. Dumbarton Oaks, Trustees for Harvard University: 239–62. doi:10.2307/1291746. JSTOR 1291746.
- Mathews, Thomas; Mathews, Annie Christine Daskalakis; Mathews, Daskalakis (1997). "Islamic-style mansions in Byzantine Cappadocia and the development of the inverted T-plan". The Journal of the Society of Architectural Historians. 56 (3). Society of Architectural Historians: 294–315. doi:10.2307/991243. JSTOR 991243.
- Mylonas, Paul (1984). "Le plan initial du catholicon de la Grande Lavra au Mont Athos et la genèse du type du catholicon athonite". Cahiers archéologiques. 32: 89–112.
- Ousterhout, Robert (1996). "An apologia for Byzantine architecture". Gesta. 35 (1). International Center of Medieval Art: 21–33. doi:10.2307/767224. JSTOR 767224. S2CID 193354724.
- R. Ousterhout, The architecture of the Kariye Camii in Istanbul (Washington, 1987). ISBN 0-88402-165-3
- R. Ousterhout, A Byzantine settlement in Cappadocia (Washington, 2005). ISBN 0-88402-310-9
- R. Ousterhout, Master builders of Byzantium (Princeton, 1999). ISBN 0-691-00535-4
- R. Ousterhout, "Reconstructing ninth-century Constantinople", in L. Brubaker, ed., Byzantium in the ninth century: Dead or Alive? (Hampshire, 1998), 115–30. ISBN 0-86078-686-2
- Pantelić, Bratislav (1997). "Nationalism and architecture: the creation of a national style in Serbian architecture and its political implications". The Journal of the Society of Architectural Historians. 56 (1). Society of Architectural Historians: 16–41. doi:10.2307/991214. JSTOR 991214.
- Papazotos, Thanasis (1991). "The Identification of the Church of "Profitis Elias" in Thessaloniki". Dumbarton Oaks Papers. 45. Dumbarton Oaks, Trustees for Harvard University: 121–27. doi:10.2307/1291696. JSTOR 1291696.
- T. Pratsch, Theodoros Studites (759-826): zwischen Dogma und Pragma (Frankfurt am Main, 1998). ISBN 3-631-33877-5
- C. L. Striker, Kalenderhane in Istanbul (Mainz, 1997). ISBN 3-8053-2026-4
