= Kilij Ali-Khan =

Iranian official and military commander

Kilij Ali-Khan or Ali Khan Kili[d]ja, in Georgian-language sources as Khan[d]jal, was an Iranian official and military commander in Afsharid Iran, who functioned as governor of Kartli under Nader Shah (r. 1736–1747).

In 1744, during the Ottoman–Persian War of 1743–1746, Kilij Ali-Khan and Teimuraz II of Kakheti (then ruling Kakheti as Afsharid governor) defeated the Ottoman Yusuf Pasha of Akhaltsikhe near Ru'is west of Gori, who was on his way to Dagestan to assist the pretender Safi Mirza.
