= House of Zedginidze =

Georgian noble family

The Amilakhvari family coat of arms

The House of Amilakhvari (Georgian: ამილახვარი) was a noble house of Georgia which rose to prominence in the fifteenth century and held a large fiefdom in central Georgia until the Imperial Russian annexation of the country in 1801. They were hereditary marshals (amilakhvar/amilakhor) of Georgia from c. 1433, from which the family takes its name. Subsequently, the family was received among the princes (knyaz) of the Empire under the name of Amilakhvarov (Russian: Амилахваровы, Амилохваровы, 1825) and Amilakhvari (Амилахвари, 1850). Till the 17th century their family residence was in Skhvilo castle, when they moved to Kvemo Chala castle.

== History ==
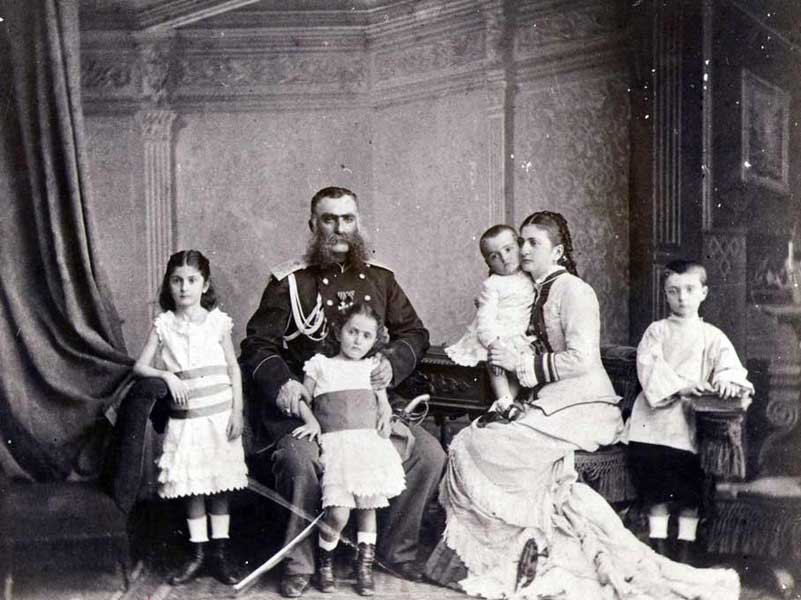
Prince Ivane Amilakhvari (1829—1905) with his family

The House of Zedginidze (ზედგინიძე), which subsequently assumed the name of its principal office-fief, of Amilakhvari (amirakhori, i.e., Prince-Master of the Horse; deputy Amirspasalar, i.e., Lord High Constable), is traceable in the province of Shida Kartli to the middle of the fourteenth century. A family legend held it that they descended from a Roman officer who accompanied Pompey on his Caucasian campaign in 65 BC. His descendants are said to have attained to Georgian nobility in the 11th century.

Since then they are called Amilakhvari and are divided by several names. Note that suffixes -shvili and -dze denote "child" and "son".

1. Bezhanishvili
2. Emukhvari
3. Erastishvili
4. Givishvili
5. Guramishvili
6. Khidirbegishvili
7. Khimshiashvil
8. Qaikhosroshvili
9. Revazishvili
10. Tusishvili
11. Zeikidze
12. Zerekidze

The family rose to an especial prominence with Iotam Zedginidze, who at the risk of his life saved King George VIII (r. 1446–1465) from the plot formed by the renegade nobles. George VIII must have elevated Joatham's eldest son, T'aqa II (or Joatham himself before he died of the wounds he had received) to the new title and offices. The family was enfeoffed of the offices of amilakhvari, sardali (commander) of the Banner of Upper Kartli, and mouravi (Palatine) of Gori, as well as of numerous fiefs, including the sepulchral abbey and cathedral of Samtavisi, the town of Kaspi and several villages on the left bank of the Mtkvari River. Their fiefdom was called Saamilakhvro (Samilakhoro), literally meaning "of Amilakhvari". The family briefly held also the duchies of Ksani (1741–1747) and of Argavi (1743–1747).

In the 17th and 18th centuries, the Zedginidze house ranked as fourth – after the Bagration-Mukhraneli, and the eristavi (ducal) dynasties of Aragvi and of Ksani – among the "undivided" princely houses of the Kingdom of Kartli. It was then that the name Amilakhvari became a surname of the heads of the house; the cadets being called Amilakhvarishvili. The Amilakhvari were related through marriage with several other noble houses of Georgia and the royal Bagrationi dynasty. After the Russian annexation of Georgia (1801) the family was received among the princes (knyaz) of the Empire under the name of Amilakhvarov (Амилахваровы, Амилохваровы, 1825) and Amilakhvari (Амилахвари, 1850).

== Notable members ==
- Ahmed-Pasha Khimshiashvili (1781-1836), Ottoman military commander;
- Arzakan Emukhvari (1880-1939), Chairman of the Abkhazian People's Council;
- Davit Givishvili (1850-1916), Georgian poet;
- Davit Guramishvili (1705-1792), Georgian poet;
- Davit Zeikidze (1945), Major General of Police;
- Dimitri Amilakhvari (1906-1942), Lieutenant Colonel of the French Foreign Legion;
- Giorgi Revazishvili (1977), Former professional football player;
- Grigol Bezhanashvili (1897-1965), Major General, Commissioner of State Security;
- Iotam Zedginidze (fl. 15th century), Court official and martyr-saint of Georgian Orthodox Church;
- Papuna Amilakhvari (died 1625), Georgian nobleman;
- Saba Tusishvili (fl. 18th century), Metropolitan Bishop of Ninotsminda.

== See also ==
- List of Georgian princely families

== Bibliography ==
- (in Georgian) იოანე ბატონიშვილი (Ioane Bagrationi; 1768–1830). "ამილახვრიანნი" (Amilakhvari). შემოკლებით აღწერა საქართველოსა შინა მცხოვრებთა თავადთა და აზნაურთა გვარებისა (The Brief Description of the Georgian Noble Houses). Retrieved on August 4, 2007.
- Toumanoff, Cyril. Studies in Christian Caucasian History, Georgetown University Press, Washington, 1967.
- Allen, William Edward David; Muratoff, Paul (1953). Caucasian Battlefields: A History of the Wars on the Turco-Caucasian Border 1828–1921. Cambridge University Press. pp. 23, 31, 33, 42.
- Khimshiashvili Dynasty
