= Kəndi Söyüdlü =

- Location within Azerbaijan
- Coordinates: 39°10′N 48°36′E
- Country: Azerbaijan
- Rayon: Jalilabad
- Time zone: UTC+4 (AZT)
  - Summer (DST): UTC+5 (AZT)

Kəndi Söyüdlü (known as Nəftəluq, Naftuluq, Naftaluk or Navtlug until 2001) is a village in the Jalilabad Rayon of Azerbaijan.
