= Ninotsminda Cathedral =

Coordinates: 41°44′12″N 45°17′52″E

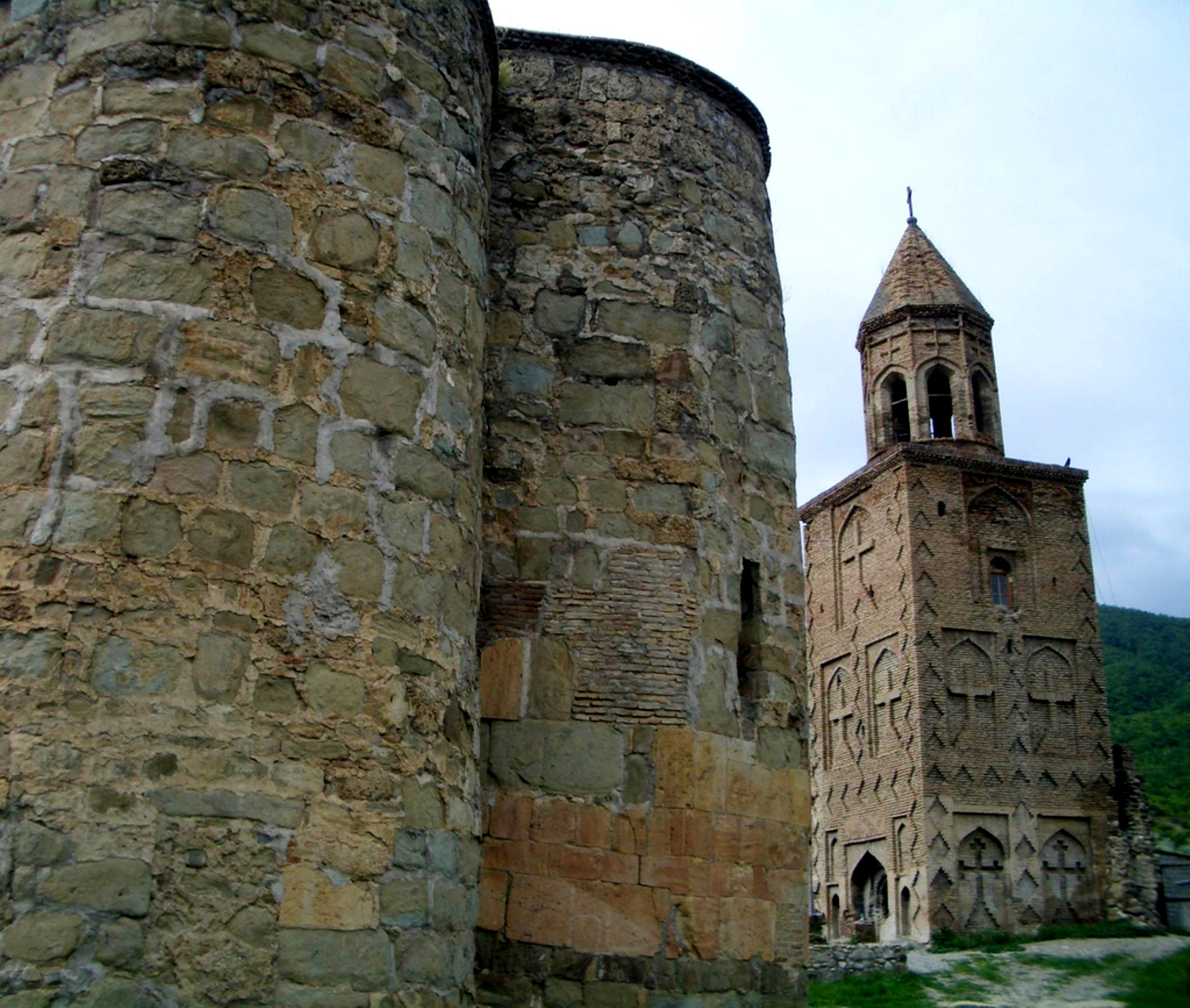
Apse and belltower of Ninotsminda Cathedral

Ninotsminda Cathedral (Georgian: ნინოწმინდის მონასტერი) (c. 575) is located in the village of Sagarejo, in the Kakheti region, Georgia.

Ninotsminda Cathedral is highly significant to the development of Georgian architecture, as it predates Jvari Monastery in Mtskheta, and served as a model for the development of the later tetraconch (four-apse) form. The site is ruins today, with only the eastern apse and a portion of the western wall remaining. Outlines of the foundations indicate that the church originally had an octagonal center, surrounded by corner niches. Historical records indicate that restoration work was undertaken in the 10th and 11th centuries, and also during 1671 and 1774. However, the cathedral collapsed during earthquakes in 1824 and 1848 and was not reconstructed.

The large brick belltower within the same complex dates from the reign of King Levan of Kakheti (1520–1574). The lower three stories served as a residence, each floor with a fireplace. The staggered placement of bricks on the exterior façade to form geometric patterns indicates the cultural influence of Safavid Persia, as does the pointed arch over the entrance.

The Ninotsminda complex is surrounded by a fortification, with corner towers and a crenellated curtain wall, dating from the 16th-17th centuries. The fortified entrance gate has protruding towers with beehive machicolations.

The complex is currently operated as a nunnery by the Georgian Orthodox Church, and reconstruction work is underway.
