= Amilakhvari castle =

Architectural monument in Kaspi, Georgia

- ამილახვართა ციხე-დარბაზები
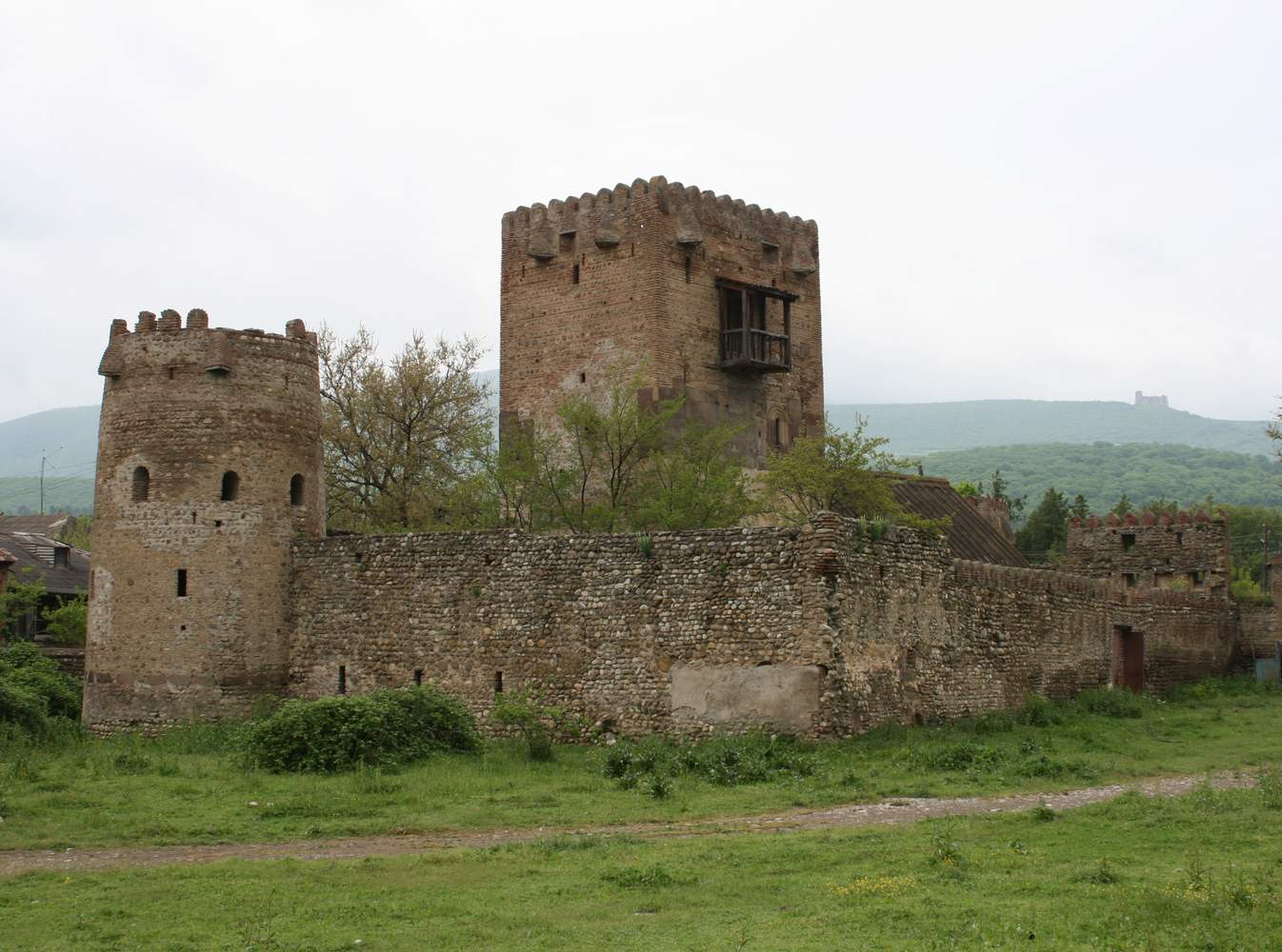
- Amilakhvari castle
- Location: Kvemo Chala, Kaspi Municipality, Shida Kartli, Georgia
- Coordinates: 42°01′49″N 44°23′34″E
- Type: Castle, museum
- Beginning date: 17th century
- Completion date: 18th century

The Amilakhvari castle (Georgian: ამილახვართა ციხე-დარბაზები) is an architectural monument located at the village of Kvemo Chala, in Kaspi, Georgia. The monument is a large complex, built in the 17th–18th century, which originally contained three castles and various buildings in each of them, and belonged to a Georgian noble family of Amilakhvari. The complex suffered considerable destruction during the centuries, and currently only the main castle and the fragments of the other two remain.

Georgia has inscribed the castle on its registry of Cultural Monuments of National Significance.

== History ==
The castle, built during the 17th century by the family of nobles Amilakhvari, was north of a larger complex that has now almost completely disappeared. It is now not possible to tell how the castle originally looked. According to an 18th-century historian, there were "large palaces" here. Indeed, Kvemo Chala originally had three rather different castles: the main one in the western part of the village, and two smaller in the eastern. North-east of the entire complex there was also a sauna. The church inside of the main castle, according to the writing on its eastern facade, was built in the last third of the 17th century by aznauri Papuna Karumidze. From its two entrances, the original was only from the south. The church of the smaller castle, according to the inscription, was built in 1775 by Amirindo Amilakhvari.

== Architecture ==
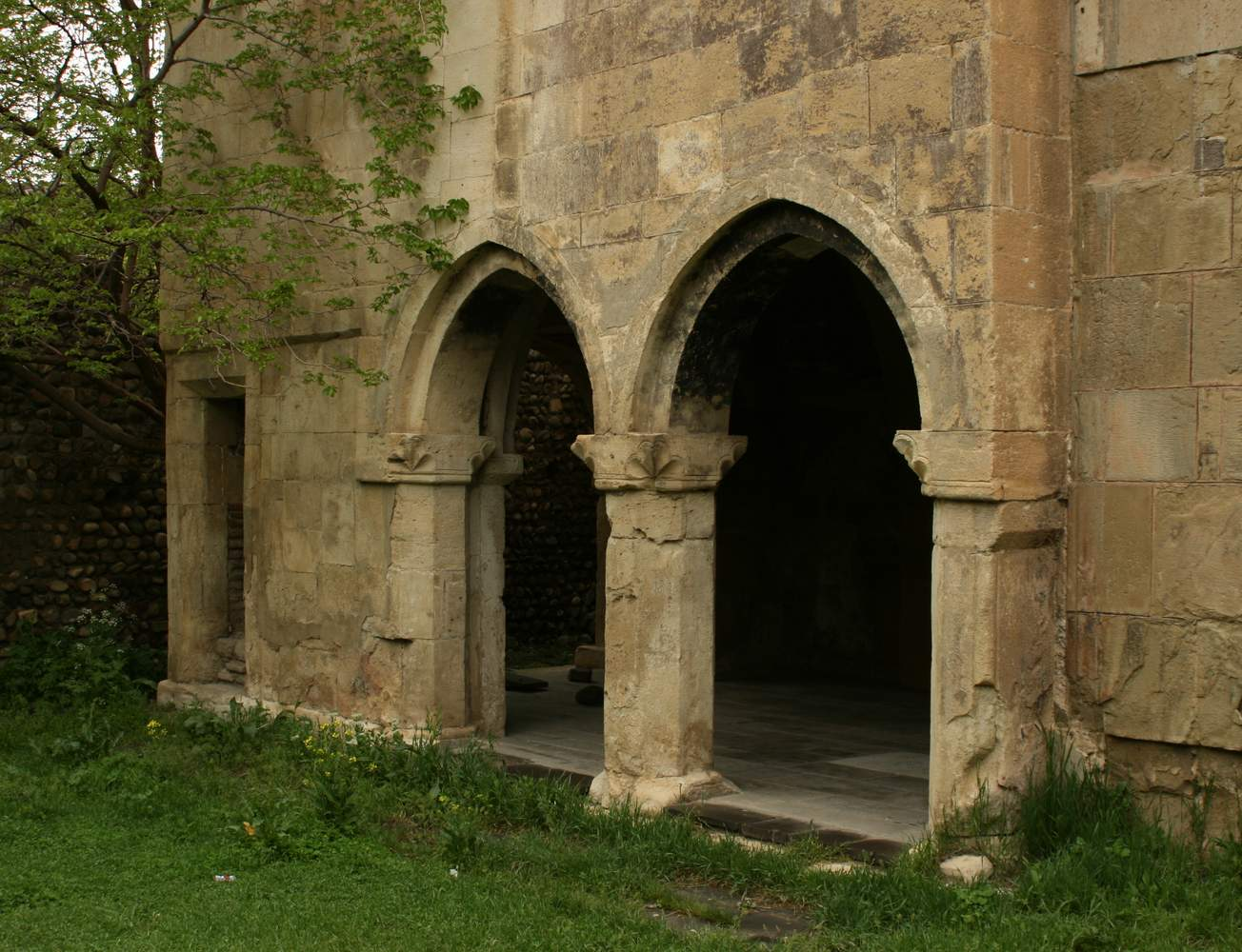
Entrance to the church inside the castle

The monument is a set of buildings, consisting of three complexes: the main castle (with towers, church, bell tower, palace), the second castle (with towers and ruins of the palace), the Amilkhrori Amilindro castle and the sauna. The buildings date from the 17th–18th centuries.

The main castle consists of a rectangular fortress, currently in ruins, a church, and two towers. The territory is divided by a wall with towers. The southern part was meant for the villagers, who could hide in the castle. The northern part was the residence of Amilakhvari, a two-storey palace with the church and the bell-tower. The 17th century hall type church is faced with ashlar and decorated with stone carvings. It has two entrances, from the south and from the north. The remaining fragments of the original frescos have expressive bright and contrasting colors. The duke's residence also has three towers, one square and two circular in section, each with arrowslits in upper floor. The Amilakhvari castle was built mainly with cobblestones, while bricks and crushed stone were used for the interiors. Originally meant to become a three-stories bell tower, the square tower near the church ended up being just a tower due to the difficult political moment the country faced when Prince Givi Amilakhvari fought intermittently with and against the Ottomans and the Persian Nader Shah, in the mid-18th century.

Near the castle, almost across the road, it is possible to see the two towers of Kvemo Chala. These towers are the remains of two minor castles, which also belonged to the Amilakhvari family. One of the castles had a nearly square shape, with four cylindrical towers. Only one of them, a five-stories tower, remains in the south-western corner. The palace was in the north-eastern part. A small hall church in the southern part of the castle has a writing, saying that it was built in 1775 by Amilakhori Amirindo, the son of Avtandil. The third castle is the most fragmentary, with only the south-eastern five-stories tower remaining.

The typical 18th century Eastern Georgian sauna has a complex interior, each room having a dome and windows in the vaults. The entrance leads to octagonal room with niches. Separate entrances lead to the side rooms and the main bathing room with the pool. The bathing room dome is decorated in sgraffito technique. The heating system is attached from the north.
