= Myroblyte saint =

Kind of saint

A myroblyte (/ˈmɪrəblaɪt/; 'whose relics produce myron'; from Byzantine Greek μυροβλύτης, muroblútēs, Latin: myroblyta; Church Slavonic: мѵрото́чецъ; Romanian: izvorâtor de mir; Georgian: მირონმდინარე) is a Christian saint from whose relics or burial place "an aromatic liquid with healing properties" or "holy water (very much like myrrh)", known as the Oil of Saints, "is said to have flowed, or still flows", or from whose body emanates a scent known as the odor of sanctity. The exudation of the oil or scent itself is referred to as myroblysia (from Greek μυροβλυσία, muroblusía) or myroblytism. In the Eastern Orthodox Church, some icons are also believed to release the oil.

== List of myroblyte saints ==
- Nilus the Myrrh-streamer, d. 1651
- Barbarus the Myroblyte
- Simon the Athonite, d. 1287
- Nectarios of Aegina
- Menas of Egypt: "In 1905-1908, thousands of little flasks with the inscription: EULOGIA TOU AGIOU MENA (Blessing of Holy Menas), or the like were excavated by C.M. Kaufmann at Baumma (Karm Abum) in the desert of Mareotis, in the northern part of the Libyan desert. The present Bumma is the burial place of the Libyan martyr Menas, which during the fifth and perhaps the sixth century was one of the most famous pilgrimage places in the Christian world. The flasks of Saint Menas were well known for a long time to archeologists, and had been found not only in Africa, but also in Spain, Italy, Dalmatia, France, and Russia, whither they had been brought by pilgrims from the shrine of Menas. Until the discoveries of Kaufmann, however, the flasks were supposed to have contained oil from the lamps that burned at the sepulchre of Menas. From various inscriptions on the flasks that were excavated by Kaufmann, it is certain that at least some, if not all, of them contained water from a holy well near the shrine of Menas, and were given as remembrances to the pilgrims. The so-called oil of Menas was therefore in reality, water from his holy well, which was used as a remedy against bodily and spiritual ailments."
- Saint Nicholas of Myra: "A fluid is said to emanate from the relics of Nicholas of Myra preserved at Bari in Italy since 1087. It is said to have also flowed from his relics when they were still in Myra."
- Apostle John the Evangelist (according to Gregory of Tours); (Note: As worded by Michael Ott: "Gregory of Tours (De Gloria martyrum, xxx: Patrologia Latina, LXXI, 730) testifies that a certain substance like flour emanated from the sepulchre of John the Evangelist. The same Gregory writes (ibid., xxxi) that from the sepulchre of the Apostle St. Andrew at Patrae emanated manna in the form of flour and fragrant oil.")
- Apostle Saint Andrew (according to Gregory of Tours);
- Antipas, Bishop of Pergamum, martyred under Emperor Domitian (Acta Sanctorum, " April, II, 4);"
- Candida the Younger of Naples, d. 586 (Acta Sanctorum, Sept., II, 230);"
- Felix of Nola, priest, died about 260 (Acta Sanctorum, Jan., II, 223);"
- Demetrius of Thessalonica, martyred in 306 or 290 (Acta Sanctorum, Oct., IV, 73-8);"
- Polycarp, bishop of Smyrna, martyred in 156.
- Euthymius the Great, abbot in Palestine, d. 473 (Acta Sanctorum, Jan., II, 687);"
- Fantinus, confessor, at Tauriano in Calabria, d. under Constantine the Great (Acta Sanctorum, July, V, 556);"
- Glyceria, martyred during the reign of Antoninus Pius (Acta Sanctorum, May, III, 191);"
- John the Almsgiver, Patriarch of Alexandria, d. 620 or 616 (Acta Sanctorum, Jan., III, 130-1);"
- Luke the Younger, surnamed Thaumaturgos, a hermit in Greece, d. 945-6 (Acta Sanctorum, Feb., II, 99);"
- Paphnutius, bishop and martyr in Greece, d. probably in the fourth century (Acta Sanctorum, April, II, 620);"
- Paul, Bishop of Verdun, d. 648 (Acta Sanctorum, Feb., II, 174);"
- Peter Thaumaturgus, Bishop of Argos, d. about 890 (Acta Sanctorum, May, I, 432);"
- Rolendis, virgin, at Gerpinnes in Belgium, d. in the seventh or eighth century (Acta Sanctorum, May, III, 243);"
- Babolenus, Abbot of St-Maur-des-Fossés near Paris, d. in the seventh century (Acta Sanctorum, June, VII, 160);"
- Gundecar, Bishop of Eichstädt, d. 1075 (Acta Sanctorum, August, I, 184);"
- Walpurga: "Famous among the oils of saints is the Oil of Saint Walburga (Walburgis oleum). It flows from the stone slab and the surrounding metal plate on which rest the relics of Walburga in her church in Eichstätt in Bavaria. The fluid is caught in a silver cup, placed beneath the slab for that purpose, and is distributed among the faithful in small vials by the Sisters of Benedict, to whom the church belongs. A chemical analysis has shown that the fluid contains nothing but the ingredients of water. Though the origin of the fluid is probably due to natural causes, the fact that it came in contact with the relics of the saint justifies the practice of using it as a remedy against diseases of the body and the soul. Mention of the oil of Walburga is made as early as the ninth century by her biographer Wolfhard of Herrieden (Acta Sanctorum, Feb., III, 562-3 and "Mon. Germ. Script., " XV, 535 sq.)."
- William, Archbishop of York, d. 1154 (Acta Sanctorum, June, II, 140).
- John of Beverley, Bishop of York, d. 721 (Acta Sanctorum, May, II, 192);"
- Franca, Cistercian abbess, d. 1218 (Acta Sanctorum, April, III, 393-4);"
- Tillo Paulus, a Benedictine monk at Solignac in Gaul, d. 703 (Acta Sanctorum, Jan., I, 380);"
- Eligius, Bishop of Noyon, d. 660 or soon after (Surius, De probatis sanctorum historiis, VI, 678);"
- Reverianus, Bishop of Autun, and Companions, martyred about 273 (Acta Sanctorum, June, I, 40-1);"
- Robert of Knaresborough, Hermit, d. 1218;
- Peter González, Dominican, d. 1246 (Acta Sanctorum, April, II, 393);"
- Perpetuus, Bishop of Tongres-Utrecht, d. 630 (Acta Sanctorum, Nov., II, 295);"
- Humilitas, first abbess of the Vallombrosian Nuns, d. 1310 (Acta Sanctorum, May, V, 211);"
- Sabinus, Bishop of Canosa, d. about 566 (Acta Sanctorum, Feb., II, 329);"
- Sigolena, Abbess of Troclar, d. about 700 (Acta Sanctorum, July, V, 636);"
- Venerius, hermit on the Island of Palamaria in the gulf of Genoa, d. in the seventh century (Acta Sanctorum, Sept., IV, 118);"

== See also ==
- Odour of sanctity
