= Oil of Saints =

Liquid which is said to flow from the relics or burial places of Christian saints

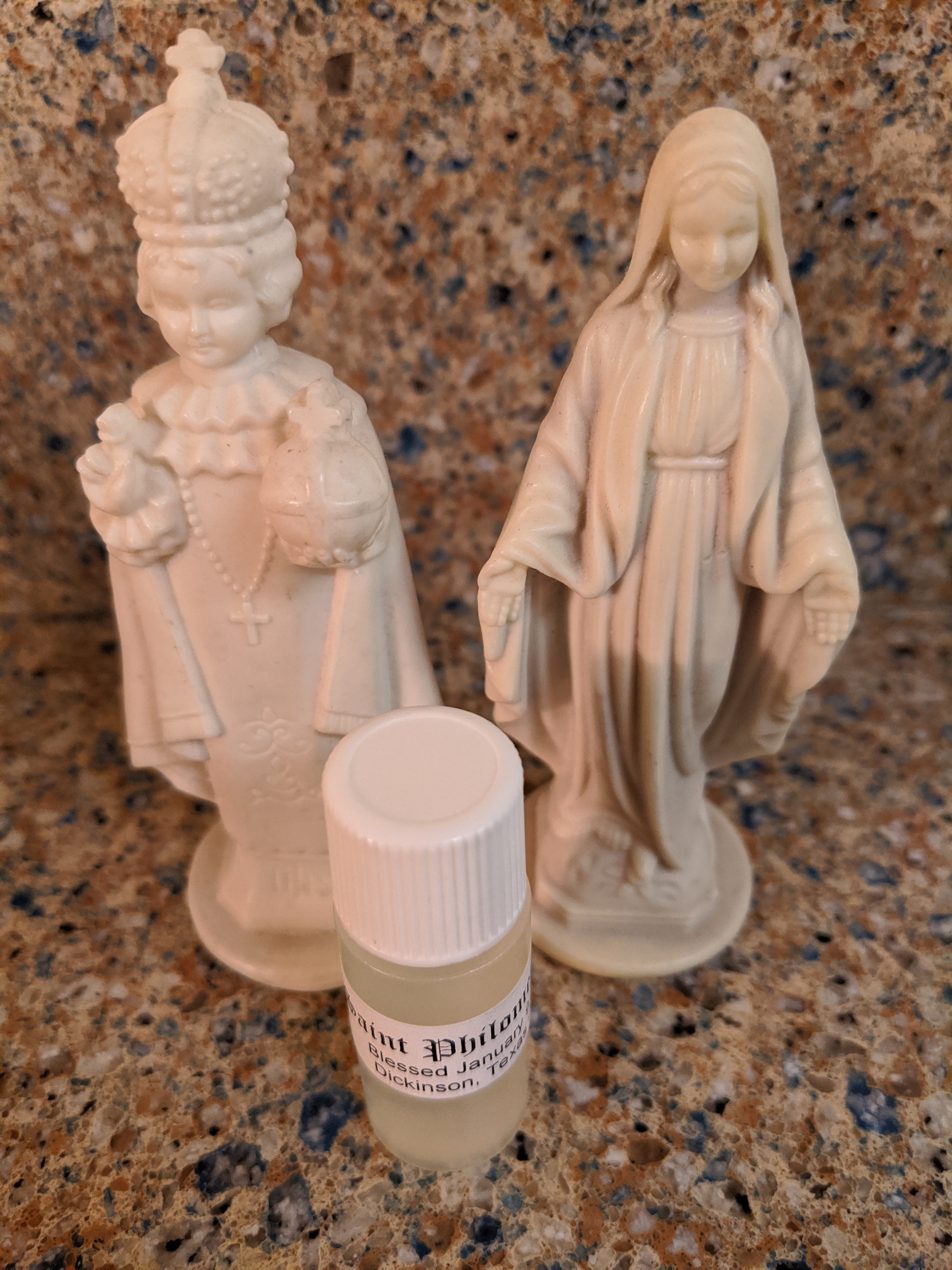
Oil of Saint Philomena

The Oil of Saints, also known as the Manna of the Saints, is "an aromatic liquid with healing properties" or "holy water (very much like myrrh)" which "is said to have flowed, or still flows, from the relics or burial places" of certain Christian saints, who are known as myroblytes while the exudation itself is referred to as myroblysia or myroblytism. In the Eastern Orthodox Church, some icons are also believed to release such oil.

According to Michael Ott, the term also refers to "the oil in the lamps that burn before the shrines of saints" or "the water that flows from the wells near their burial places", or "the oil and the water which have in some way come in contact with their relics."

== Uses of the Oil ==
According to Michael Ott:

These oils are or have been used by the faithful, with the belief that they will cure bodily and spiritual ailments, not through any intrinsic power of their own, but through the intercession of the saints with whom the oils have some connection. In the days of St. Paulinus of Nola (d. 431) the custom prevailed of pouring oil over the relics or reliquaries of martyrs and then gathering it in vases, sponges, or pieces of cloth. This oil, oleum martyris, was distributed among the faithful as a remedy against sickness [Paulini Nolani Carmen, XVIII, lines 38-40 and Carmen, XXI, lines 590-600, in Corpus Scriptorum Ecclesiasticorum Latinorum (Vienna, 1866 sq.), XXX, 98, 177]. According to the testimony of [Paulinus of Pétrigeux] (wrote about 470) in Gaul this custom was extended also to the relics of saints that did not die as martyrs, especially to the relics of St. Martin of Tours (Paulini Petricordiae Carmen de vita S. Martini, V, 101 sq. in Corpus Scriptorum Ecclesiasticorum Latinorum, XVI, 111). In their accounts of miracles, wrought through the application of oils of saints, the early ecclesiastical writers do not always state just what kind of oils of saints is meant. Thus St Augustine (City of God, Book XXII) mentions that a dead man was brought to life by the agency of the oil of St Stephen.

== List of myroblyte saints ==
- Nilus of Kynouria
- Barbarus the Former Robber
- Simon the Athonite
- Saint Walpurga: "Famous among the oils of saints is the Oil of Saint Walburga (Walburgis oleum). It flows from the stone slab and the surrounding metal plate on which rest the relics of St. Walburga in her church in Eichstätt in Bavaria. The fluid is caught in a silver cup, placed beneath the slab for that purpose, and is distributed among the faithful in small vials by the Sisters of St. Benedict, to whom the church belongs. A chemical analysis has shown that the fluid contains nothing but the ingredients of water. Mention of the oil of St. Walburga is made as early as the ninth century by her biographer Wolfhard of Herrieden (Acta Sanctorum, Feb., III, 562-3 and "Mon. Germ. Script., " XV, 535 sq.)."
- Saint Menas: "In 1905-1908, thousands of little flasks with the inscription: EULOGIA TOU AGIOU MENA (Remembrance of St. Menas), or the like were excavated by C.M. Kaufmann at Baumma (Karm Abum) in the desert of Mareotis, in the northern part of the Libyan desert. The present Bumma is the burial place of the Libyan martyr Menas, which during the fifth and perhaps the sixth century was one of the most famous pilgrimage places in the Christian world. The flasks of Saint Menas were well known for a long time to archeologists, and had been found not only in Africa, but also in Spain, Italy, Dalmatia, France, and Russia, whither they had been brought by pilgrims from the shrine of Menas. Until the discoveries of Kaufmann, however, the flasks were supposed to have contained oil from the lamps that burned at the sepulchre of Menas. From various inscriptions on the flasks that were excavated by Kaufmann, it is certain that at least some, if not all, of them contained water from a holy well near the shrine of St. Menas, and were given as remembrances to the pilgrims. The so-called oil of St. Menas was therefore in reality, water from his holy well, which was used as a remedy against bodily and spiritual ailments."
- Saint Nicholas of Myra: "A fluid is said to emanate from the relics of Nicholas of Myra preserved at Bari in Italy since 1087. It is said to have also flowed from his relics when they were still in Myra."
- Apostle John the Evangelist (according to Gregory of Tours); (Note: As worded by Michael Ott: "Gregory of Tours (De Gloria martyrum, xxx: Patrologia Latina, LXXI, 730) testifies that a certain substance like flour emanated from the sepulchre of John the Evangelist. The same Gregory writes (ibid., xxxi) that from the sepulchre of the Apostle St. Andrew at Patrae emanated manna in the form of flour and fragrant oil.")
- Apostle Saint Andrew (according to Gregory of Tours);
- "St. Antipas, Bishop of Pergamum, martyred under Emperor Domitian (Acta Sanctorum, " April, II, 4);"
- "St. Babolenus, Abbot of St-Maur-des-Fossés near Paris, d. in the seventh century (Acta Sanctorum, June, VII, 160);"
- "St. Candida the Younger of Naples, d. 586 (Acta Sanctorum, Sept., II, 230);"
- "St. Fantinus, confessor, at Tauriano in Calabria, d. under Constantine the Great (Acta Sanctorum, July, V, 556);"
- "St. Felix of Nola, priest, died about 260 (Acta Sanctorum, Jan., II, 223);"
- "St. Franca, Cistercian abbess, d. 1218 (Acta Sanctorum, April, III, 393-4);"
- "St. Glyceria, martyred during the reign of Antoninus Pius (Acta Sanctorum, May, III, 191);"
- "Bl. Gundecar, Bishop of Eichstädt, d. 1075 (Acta Sanctorum, August, I, 184);"
- "St. Humilitas, first abbess of the Vallombrosian Nuns, d. 1310 (Acta Sanctorum, May, V, 211);"
- "St. John the Almsgiver, Patriarch of Alexandria, d. 620 or 616 (Acta Sanctorum, Jan., III, 130-1);"
- "St. John of Beverley, Bishop of York, d. 721 (Acta Sanctorum, May, II, 192);"
- "St. Luke the Younger, surnamed Thaumaturgos, a hermit in Greece, d. 945-6 (Acta Sanctorum, Feb., II, 99);"
- "St. Paphnutius, bishop and martyr in Greece, d. probably in the fourth century (Acta Sanctorum, April, II, 620);"
- "St. Paul, Bishop of Verdun, d. 648 (Acta Sanctorum, Feb., II, 174);"
- "St. Perpetuus, Bishop of Tongres-Utrecht, d. 630 (Acta Sanctorum, Nov., II, 295);"
- "St. Peter González, Dominican, d. 1246 (Acta Sanctorum, April, II, 393);"
- "St. Peter Thaumaturgus, Bishop of Argos, d. about 890 (Acta Sanctorum, May, I, 432);"
- "St. Rolendis, virgin, at Gerpinnes in Belgium, d. in the seventh or eighth century (Acta Sanctorum, May, III, 243);"
- "St. Reverianus, Bishop of Autun, and Companions, martyred about 273 (Acta Sanctorum, June, I, 40-1);"
- "St. Sabinus, Bishop of Canosa, d. about 566 (Acta Sanctorum, Feb., II, 329);"
- "St. Sigolena, Abbess of Troclar, d. about 700 (Acta Sanctorum, July, V, 636);"
- "St. Tillo Paulus, a Benedictine monk at Solignac in Gaul, d. 703 (Acta Sanctorum, Jan., I, 380);"
- "St. Venerius, hermit on the Island of Palamaria in the gulf of Genoa, d. in the seventh century (Acta Sanctorum, Sept., IV, 118);"
- "St. William, Archbishop of York, d. 1154 (Acta Sanctorum, June, II, 140)."

== The Oil of St Philomena ==
In Mugnano del Cardinale, a local woman on 26 August 1805 placed her hands into the oil lamp that burned in front of the sacred body of Saint Philomena and anointed the eyes of her blind child. The child's vision was said to be immediately restored. Every year, the oil at the Sanctuary of St. Philomena is blessed by the Bishop of Nola and distributed to faithful Christians. The Oil of Saint Philomena has the status of a sacramental and devotees are usually anointed on the forehead with it by either a priest or layperson.

== See also ==
- Chrism
- Holy Ampulla – Glass vial containing the chrism for French coronations from 1131 to 1774
- Holy anointing oil
- Sacramentals
