= Odour of sanctity =

Scent believed to emanate from the bodies of saints

The odour of sanctity, according to both the Catholic Church and the Eastern Orthodox Church, is commonly understood to mean a specific scent (often compared to flowers) that emanates from the bodies of saints, especially from the wounds of stigmata. These saints are called myroblytes while the exudation itself is referred to as myroblysia or myroblytism.

== Meanings ==
The odour of sanctity can be understood to mean two things:

1. An ontological state (a state of being), not usually related to an actual olfactory sensation, indicating that the individual possessing it is in a state of grace (i.e., a state characterized by the absence of mortal sin). This usually refers to the state of an individual's soul at the time of death. Some canonized saints are said to have died in an odour of sanctity.
2. An actual odour (scent or aroma) present at the time of death and for some time thereafter.

== Odour of sanctity and sainthood ==
The term "odour of sanctity" appears to have emerged in the Middle Ages, at a time when many saints were raised to that status by acclamation of the faithful. In the absence of carefully written records, either by or about the individual, evidence of a saintly life was attested to only by personal recollections of those around him or her. It appears that the odour of sanctity occurring at the person's death carried some weight in convincing the local ecclesiastical authority to canonize the saint – to allow the faithful to venerate them and ask the saint to intercede on their behalf.

== Potential natural cause ==
There is a theory that the odour of sanctity is due to the smell of acetone and/or acetoacetic acid, caused by ketosis brought on by starvation from fasting.

== Notable examples ==
Saint Teresa of Ávila and Saint Maravillas of Jesus (both Spanish Discalced Carmelites) were reported to have emitted heavenly scents immediately after their respective deaths, with Teresa's scent filling her monastery the moment she died. Saint Thérèse de Lisieux (a French Discalced Carmelite known as "the Little Flower") was said to have produced a strong scent of roses at her death, which was detectable for days afterward.

At the moment Madame Elisabeth was guillotined, it is claimed that "an odour of roses was diffused over the Place de la Révolution" where she met her end. Likewise, the blood issuing from Padre Pio's stigmata allegedly smelled of flowers. Some dust taken from the incorrupt remains of Maria Droste zu Vischering in 1899 was said to have emanated an agreeable scent.

== See also ==
- Incorruptibility
- Oil of Saints
