= Nilus of Sinai =

Egyptian saint

Saint Nilus of Sinai
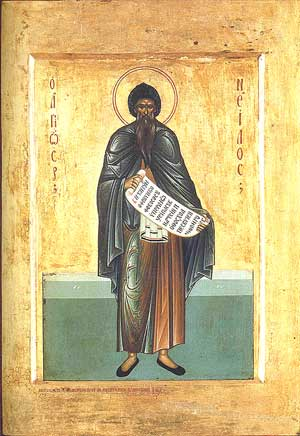
- Russian icon of Nil Postnik

abbot
- Born: c. 365 AD; Ancyra, Galatia (modern-day Turkey)
- Died: 12 November, 430 or 451 AD; Mount Sinai, Arabia Petraea (modern-day Egypt)
- Venerated in: Eastern Orthodox Church; Roman Catholic Church; Armenian Apostolic Church
- Feast: 12 November (Catholic and Eastern Orthodox calendars)

Nilus the Elder of Sinai (Greek: Νείλος; also known as Neilos, Nilus of Sinai, Nilus of Ancyra, Nil Postnik ("the Faster"); c. 365 – 12 November 430 or 451) was one of the many disciples and stalwart defenders of John Chrysostom.

== Life ==
A native of Constantinople, Nilus was a layman, married, with two children. As a relatively young man, he was appointed eparch of the city. He was a disciple of the patriarch, John Chrysostom (before his first exile: 398–403). He directed Nilus in the study of Scripture and in works of piety. Chrysostom had a profound Influence on Nilus and his wife, and sometime between 390 and or 404, the couple decided to part and each pursue the monastic life. Nilus left with his son, Theodulos, and went to Mount Sinai to be a monk. His wife and daughter went to a women's monastery in Egypt.

Nilus and his son were at Sinai until about the year 410 when Saracen raiders captured Theodulos and took him prisoner. They eventually sold him as a slave, and he came into the possession of the Bishop of Elusa in Palestine. The Bishop received Theodulos among his clergy and made him door-keeper of the church. Meanwhile, Nilus, having left to find his son, at last met him at Elusa. The bishop then ordained them both priests and allowed them to return to Sinai. For forty years a cave served as their dwelling. Nilus was a well known person throughout the Eastern Church; through his writings and correspondence he played an important part in the history of his time. He was known as a theologian, Biblical scholar and ascetic writer, and people of all kinds, from the emperor down, sought his counsel.

His numerous works, including a multitude of letters, consist of denunciations of heresy, paganism, abuses of discipline and crimes, of rules and principles of asceticism, especially maxims about the religious life. He warns and threatens people in high places, abbots and bishops, governors and princes, even the emperor himself, without fear. He kept up a correspondence with Gainas, a leader of the Goths, endeavouring to convert him from Arianism; he denounced vigorously the persecution of John Chrysostom both to the Emperor Arcadius and to his courtiers. Nilus died at Ancyra, Galatia in the year 430 or 451. His remains were brought to Constantinople in the reign of Justin the Younger, and deposited in the church of the apostles there.

His feast is kept on 12 November in the Eastern Orthodox calendar; he is commemorated also in the Roman Martyrology on the same date. The Armenian Church remembers him, with other Egyptian fathers, on the Thursday after the third Sunday of their Advent.

== Works ==
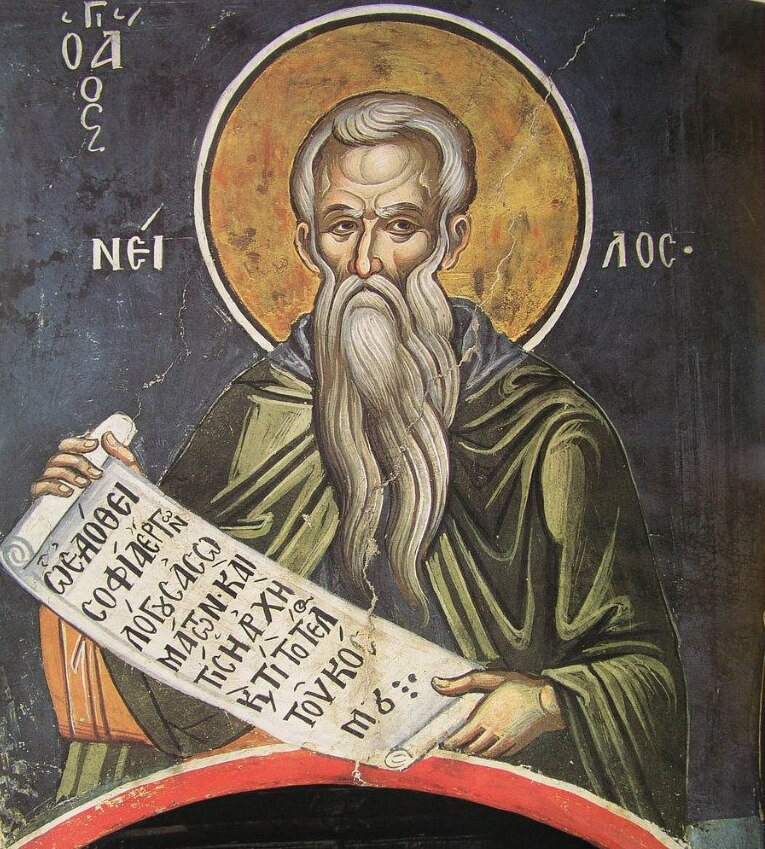
Fresco from Dionysiou Monastery

The 1903 Catholic Encyclopedia describes Nilus as "one of the leading ascetic writers of the 5th century." His Ascetic Discourse is found in volume I of the English Philokalia, "a collection of texts written between the 4th and 15th centuries by spiritual masters" His works can be classified into four types:

1. Works about virtues and vices in general:"Of the vice opposed to virtues "On the word of the Gospel of Luke". In his treatise "On Prayer", he recommends one ask of God, in the first place, the gift of prayer.
2. "Works about the monastic life": — Concerning the slaughter of monks on Mount Sinai, in seven parts, telling the story of the author's life at Sinai, the invasion of the Saracens, captivity of his son, etc.; Concerning Albianos, a Nitrian monk whose life is held up as an example; "Of Asceticism" (Logos asketikos, about the monastic ideal; "Of voluntary poverty" (peri aktemosynes; "Of the superiority of monks"; "To Eulogios the monk".
3. "Admonitions" (Gnomai) or "Chapters" (kephalaia), about 200 precepts drawn up in short maxims (ib., 1239–62). These are probably made by his disciples from his discourses.
4. "Letters": — Possinus published 355, Allatius 1061 letters, divided into four books (P. G., 79, 81-585). Many are not complete, several overlap, or are not really letters but excerpts from Nilus' works; some are spurious.

== Prophecy of St. Nilus ==
"The Posthumous Predictions of St. Nilus the Myrrh-streaming," were purportedly published in 1912 at Mount Athos, and attributed to a monk of Mount Athos now known as Nilus the Myrrh-streamer, who died in 1651. Apocalyptic in nature, it has been variously interpreted depending on individual perspectives. With the advent of the Internet, the work has taken on the status of urban legend, widely wrongly imputed to Nilas of Sinai.
