= Metropolis of Argolis =

Metropolis of Argolis Ιερά Μητρόπολις Αργολίδος
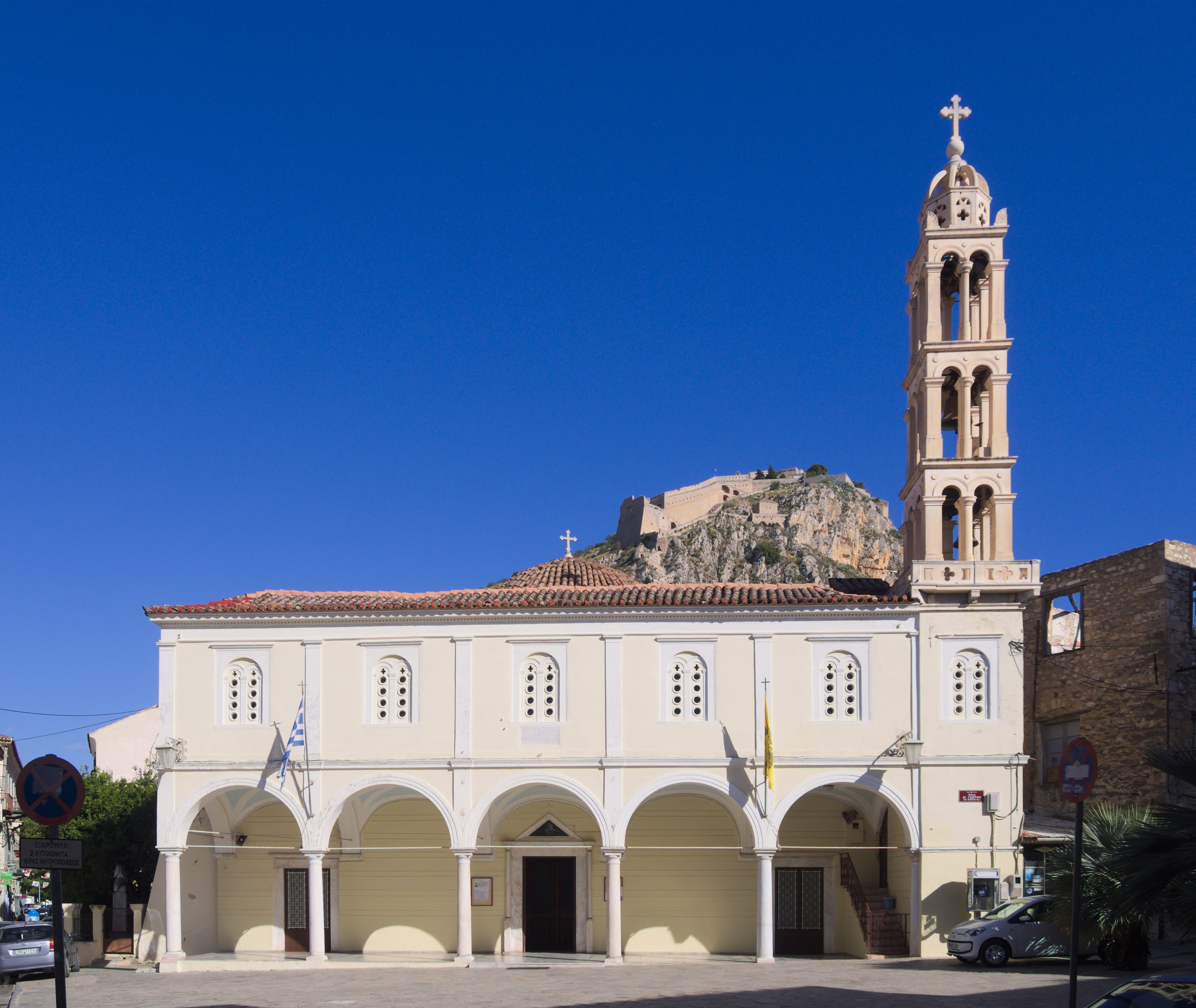
- St. George Metropolitan Cathedral

Location
- Country: Greece
- Ecclesiastical province: Argolis
- Archdeaconries: 8: Nafplio; Argos; Agia Triada; Asini; Achladokampos; Prosymna; Lygourio; Lyrkeia
- Headquarters: Nafplio

Statistics
- Parishes: 78
- Churches: 76 churches, 98 chapels, 270 exoklessia (chapels-of-ease used for designated saints' days), 95 memorial shrines, 8 monastic chapels, 59 private chapels.

Information
- Formation: 1189
- Cathedral: Saint George Metropolitan Cathedral, Nafplio

Current leadership
- Bishop: Nektarios Antonopoulos

Website
- https://imargolidos.gr

The Metropolis of Argolis (Greek: Ιερά Μητρόπολις Αργολίδος, "Holy Metropolis of Argolis") is a diocese of the Church of Greece, with its seat at Nafplio, covering the historical Argolid (Argolis). It occupies the current boundaries of the modern Prefecture of Argolis, except for the municipality of Ermionida.

The see's original name was the Bishopric of Argos, and according to Paulinus the Deacon, it was founded by Saint Andrew. The early bishops of Argos were suffragan to the Metropolis of Corinth. It was separated from Corinth renamed the Metropolis of Argos and Nafplio in 1189, confirming an earlier de facto merger with Nauplion. In 1833, it was renamed the Metropolis of Argolis. Its cathedra was originally Argos, but it moved around the Argolid several times due to political factors.

Its incumbent is Metropolitan Nektarios Antonopoulos (b. 1952). The previous metropolitan, from 1985 until his death, was Metropolitan Iakovos ("James") II (1932-2013), who died 26 March 2013. (In Greek, the late metropolitan, like other deceased Orthodox faithful, he is referred to as makaristos — "of blessed memory.") The current metropolitan was chosen on 18 October 2013.

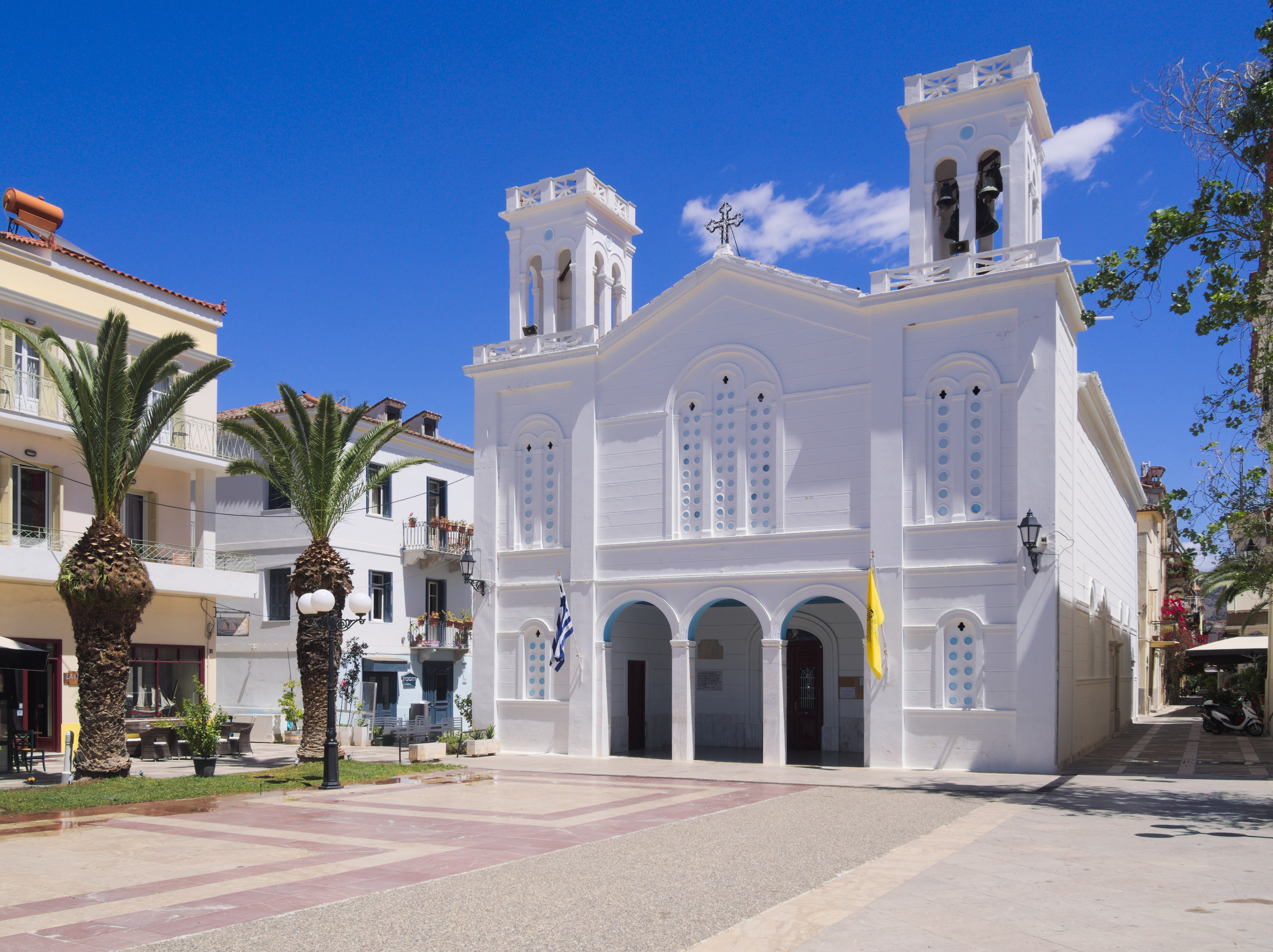
Saint Nicholas Church in Nafplio

== History and ecclesiastical administration ==
According to the article "Argos and Orthodoxy Through the Passage of the Ages", written by the Archimandrite Kallinikos D. Korobokis, the diocesan homilist (published in the periodical "Eyes on Argolis", Volume 10, May–June 2002), the history of the metropolitan see is recorded as follows:

Paulinus (354-431 AD) relates that the Apostle Andrew first proclaimed the Gospel at Argos, and thus he is traditionally held to be the founder of the Church there. It is also likely that the Apostle Paul came to Argos, some time around 50-60 AD; he remained in Corinth for a considerable number of months and, it is also thought, all around the neighboring provinces of Corinth. Argos acclaimed a bishop fairly early on, separate from that of the bishopric of Nauplia (Nafplio), with both under the jurisdiction of the Metropolis of Corinth.

The first known Bishop of Argos is Perigenes. At the end of the 9th century, the Bishop of Argos was Saint Peter the Wonderworker, who became the town's patron saint. The sees of Argos and Nauplion were unified in 1166. According to other sources, the unification of Argos and Nauplion had already occurred a few years after 879. Throughout the minutes of the Council of 879 in Constantinople, written by the members, the Bishop of Argos is recorded as Theotimos, and that of Nauplion as Andreas, which establishes a terminus post quem, but not a precise date for the unification. In 1189 the unified diocese of Argos and Nauplion was extracted from the Metropolis of Corinth and converted into a metropolitan see sui juris, with one John serving as its first metropolitan.

According to the Argolic Calendar of 1910, which was produced by the Bishops of Argos and Nauplion, the Eparchy (Bishopric) of Argos was led under the Metropolis of Corinth:

— Bishops of Argos and Nauplion, Argolic Calendar of Saints

According to the anonymous hand-written chronicle published in Δελτίω Ιστορ. Εθνολ. Εταιρίας Τ.Β΄ σελ. 32, ed. Io. Sakellionos (Bulletins of the Historical and Ethnological Society of Greece 303, p. 32), there are 23 recorded Bishops of Argos and Nauplion. Their names are as follows:

- Peter the Wonderworker
- Constantine
- Christopher
- Peter
- John
- Nicholas
- Sisinius
- Andrew
- Theodore
- Sisinius
- Peter
- Basil
- Theophylact
- Sisinius
- Gregory
- Nicholas, the ktitor (donator) of Agios Andreas (Saint Andrew's Church)
- John, the ktitor (donator) of the new church
- Gregory
- Constantine
- Theodore Leon
- Nicitas John, who led the diocese down to its new title of Nauplion and Argos.

In 1212, the local Orthodox hierarchy was replaced by Latin hierarchs during the period of Frankish rule in which the two towns formed part of the Lordship of Argos and Nauplia. This state of affairs lasted until 1540, with the withdrawal of the Venetians after the Third Ottoman-Venetian War.

Afterwards, the diocese returned to the control of Greek Orthodox hierarchs, but in 1686, the seat of the bishop moved from Argos to Nafplio. Shortly after the Venetians returned, and with them, a Roman Catholic hierarchy, and the Orthodox administration re-located to the village of Merbaka, returning to Argos in 1770 in the wake of attacks by Albanian irregulars.

At the outbreak of the Greek War of Independence, the seat moved again to Nafplio. The bishop, Grigorios Kalamaras was killed in the Siege of Tripolitsa, and is consequently termed an ethnomartyr a national martyr, Greek: ἐθνομάρτυρας. This designation is a popular one, and has no canonical status making the bishop a saint, as death in battle does not necessarily qualify one for martyrdom.

After the creation of the Greek state but before the creation of the new autocephalous Church of Greece in 1850, the diocese underwent a brief period of successive reorganizations as the Patriarchate of Constantinople adjusted to having large numbers of faithful outside the Ottoman millet system. It was briefly merged with the Metropolis of Corinth (1841), with the addition of the Bishopric of Hydra in 1842, before its present jurisdiction was created between 1850 and 1852.

Currently, the Bishop of Epidavros (Epidaurus) is suffragan to the Metropolitan Bishop of Argolis, and serves as the auxiliary bishop for the metropolis; he is sui juris the bishop of the See of Epidavros, and is subordinate to the Metropolitan only in his capacity as auxiliary in the See of Argolis and the metropolitan synod, over which the metropolitan presides. The General Hierarocratic Commissioner — akin to a western vicar general or archdeacon — is Archpriest Vasileios (Basil) Soulandros.

The Roman Catholic name for the diocese was Dioecesis Argolicensis . It is currently listed as suppressed, but in the past was used as the name of a titular see. Prior to 1882, the term used by the Catholic Church to describe this and other Orthodox dioceses formerly governed by Latin clergy was in partibus infidelium ("in the parts of the infidels"), but the term was changed by the papacy of Pope Leo XIII, reportedly in response to complaints by King George I of Greece over its offensive nature.

== List of bishops and metropolitans ==
According to the French theologian and scholar Michel Le Quien, these are the earliest bishops of Argos, as recorded in Greek and Latin sources:

1. Perigenes
2. Genethlius
3. Onesimus
4. Thales
5. John
6. Theotimus
7. Peter the Wonderworker
8. Leo
9. John
10. ? (Name lost; recorded only in a Greek source in which he is addressed by the Patriarch of Constantinople as "The most holy Bishop of Nauplia and Argos, in the Holy Spirit..."
11. Dionysius I, "Bishop of Nauplion and Argos" in a Greek source; "Bishop of the Nauplians and the Argives" in a Latin source
12. Dionysius II, also Bishop of Nauplia
13. ? (name lost to history, recorded only as "& Metropolitan of Patras"; possibly also holding the bishopric of Anaplia (a medieval name for Nauplia.)
14. Meletius
15. Gabriel
16. Basil
17. Theophanes
18. Macarius
19. Benedict (1767), in the time of the Patriarch Samuel of Constantinople
20. Neophyte
21. Dorotheus
22. James Armogavles
23. Gregory of Sitsovis

== Monasteries ==
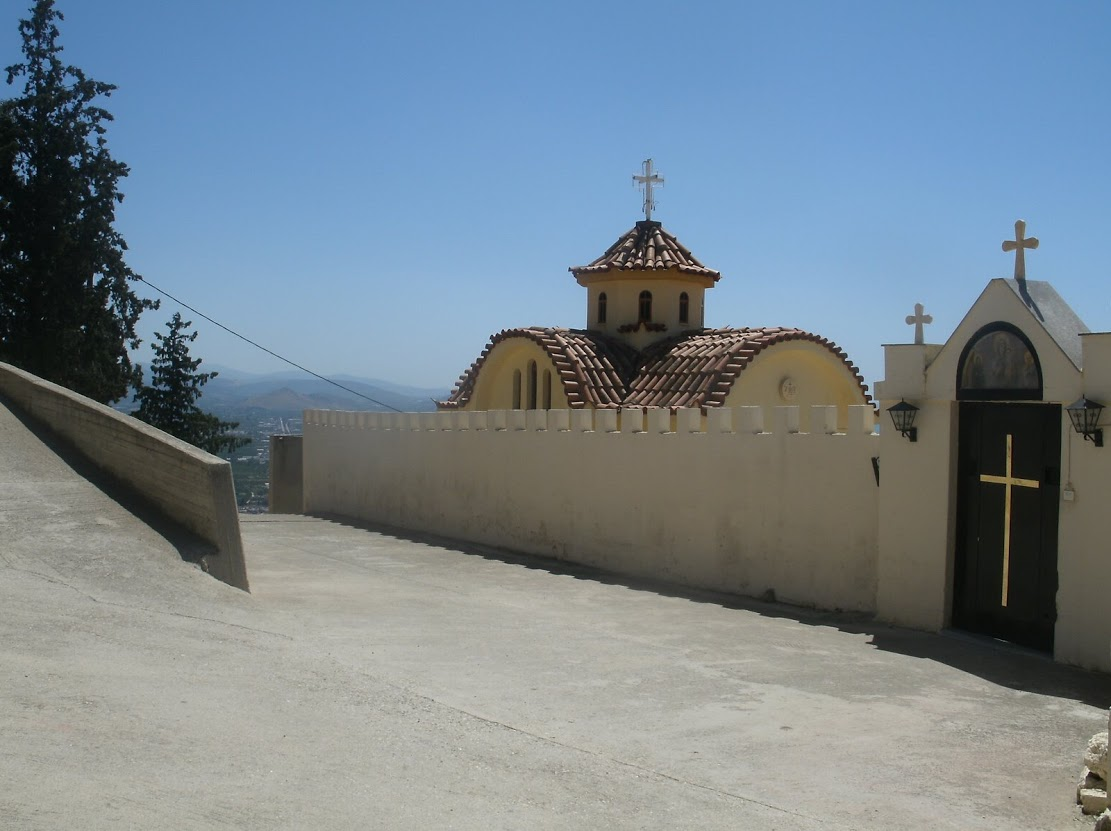
The Monastery of Agia Marina at Argos from the road to Castle Larissa.

- The Monastery of Holy Photeine the Samaritan Woman, (9), (Male)
- The Monastery of the All-Great Taxiarchs of Southern Epidaurus (Named for the archangels Ss. Michael and Gabriel, generals of the heavenly host), (21), (Female)
- The Monastery of the Naive, (for the naive Virgin Mary), glebe or abbey farm attached to Taxiarchs, above.
- The Monastery of Blessed Theodosius the Neomartyr (17), (Female)
- The Monastery of Saint Demetrius at Karakala (13), (Female)
- The Monastery of the Dormition of the Theotokos at Kalamios, (29), (Female)
- The Monastery of Saint Marina at Argos, (6), (Female)
- The Monastery of The Venerable Forerunner at Borsa, (5), (Female)
- The Monastery of Life-giving Spring - silent cloister, (10), (Female)
- The Monastery of Saint Macrina, silent cloister, (10), (Female)

Total monastics, 121.

Within geographical boundaries of the Metropolis of Argolis there exists a further monastery, the Monastery of Avgou (Saint Demetrius), which is placed under the jurisdiction of the Metropolis of Hydra, Spetses, and Aegina.

== People ==
- Peter the Wonderworker (Saint, Bishop of Argos)
- Grigorios Kalamaras (Ethnomartyr, Bishop of Argos and Nauplion)
- Athanasius (Metropolitan of Argos, 1869-1925)
- Agathonicus (Metropolitan of Argos, 1898-1956)
- Chrysostomos I (civil name, Tavladorakis, 1909- 6 August 1977). He was Metropolitan of Argos from 1945 to 1965, and concurrently Metropolitan of Piraeus from 1965 to his death.
- Iakovos (James) II, (civil name, Damianos Pakhis, 1932-26 March 2013). Metropolitan from 23 November 1985 to his death.

== Media ==
- Radio: The diocese maintains an FM radio station, 105.2, which began broadcasting in 1991.

== Sources ==
This page is a translation-in-progress from the Greek Wikipedia article, which relies upon the following sources written in the Greek language.

- "Αργολικόν Ημερολόγιο 1910". Εκδιδόμενων υπό του εν Αθήναις συλλόγου των Αργείων. Εν Αθήναις, εκ του τυπογραφείου Δημ. Τερζόπουλου 1910. ("Argolic Calendar 1910". Published in Athens by the Society of Argives. At Athens, by the publisher Demetrios Terzopoulos 1910.)
- "Άργος και Ορθοδοξία στο διάβα των αιώνων", αρχιμανδρίτης Καλλίνικος Δ. Κορομπόκης, ιεροκήρυκας της Ιεράς Μητροπόλεως Αργολίδος, (δημοσιεύθηκε στο Περιοδικό “Ματιές στην Αργολίδα”, τευχ. 10, Μάιος – Ιούνιος 2002) ("Argos and Orthodoxy through the Progress of the Ages." Archimadndrite Kallinikos D. Korobokis, Diocesan Homilist of the Holy Metropolis of Argolis. Published in the periodical "Eyes on Argolis," Vol. 10, May–June, 2002)
- Εκκλησία της Ελλάδος (για Μητροπόλεις) (Church of Greece webpage for the metropolises)
- Στοιχεία στην Αργολική Αρχειακή Βιβλιοθήκη Ιστορίας και Πολιτισμού (Records of the Argolic Archival Library of History and Culture)
