= Simonopetra =

Eastern Orthodox monastery, Mount Athos

- Σιμωνόπετρα
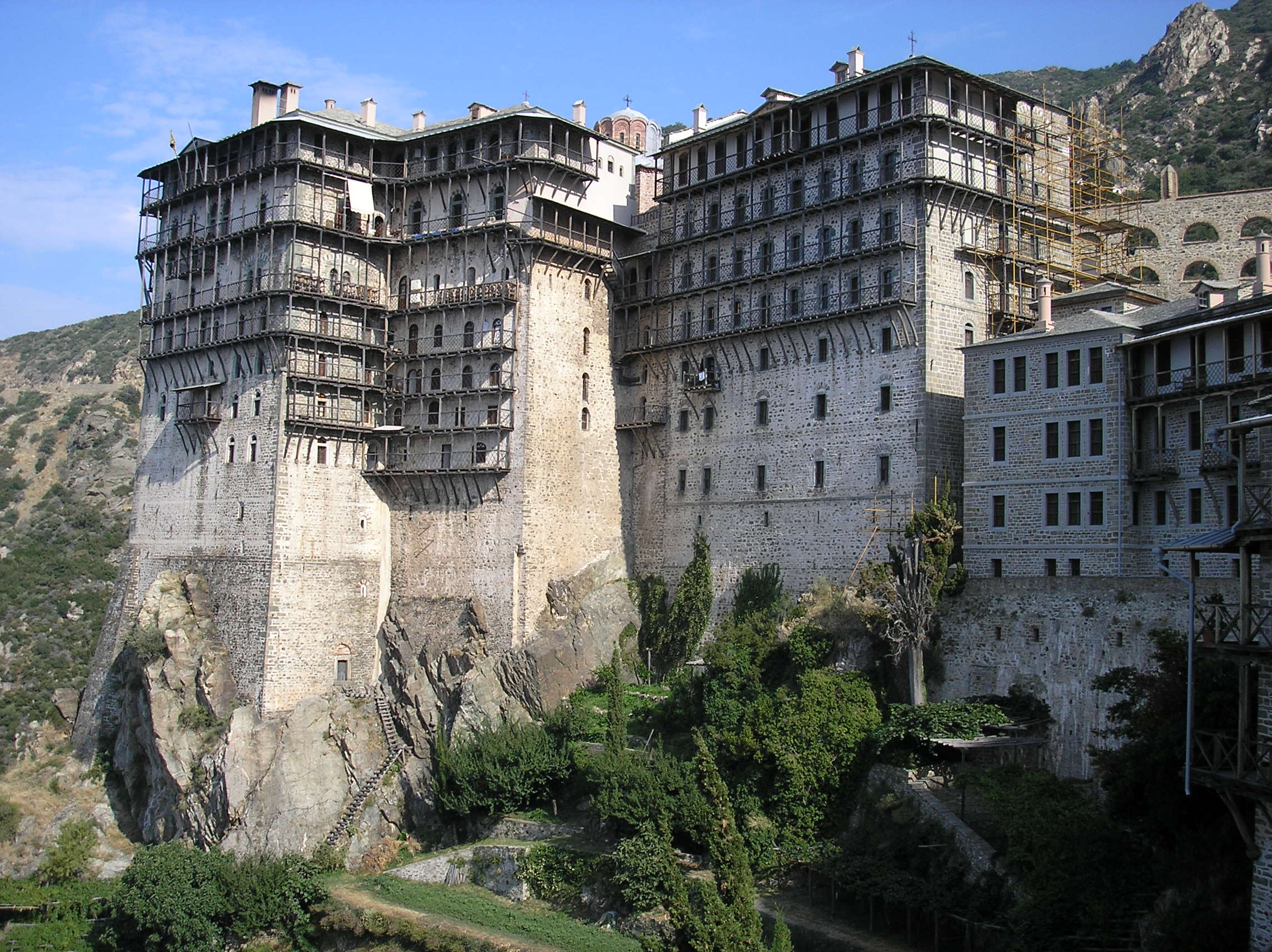
- Southern view of the monastery.

- Location within Mount Athos
- Interactive map of Simonopetra

Monastery information
- Full name: Holy Monastery of Simonopetra
- Other name: Simonos Petra
- Order: Ecumenical Patriarchate
- Established: 13th century
- Dedication: Nativity of Jesus
- Diocese: Mount Athos

People
- Founder: Simon the Athonite
- Prior: Archimandrite Elder Eliseus

Site
- Location: Mount Athos, Greece
- Coordinates: 40°11′23″N 24°14′44″E
- Public access: Men only

Simonopetra Monastery (Greek: Σιμωνόπετρα, literally: "Simon's Rock"), also Monastery of Simonos Petra (Greek: Μονή Σίμωνος Πέτρας), is an Eastern Orthodox monastery in the monastic state of Mount Athos in Greece. It ranks 13th in the hierarchy of the Athonite monasteries.

It is on the southern coast of the Athos peninsula, between the Athonite port of Dafni and Osiou Grigoriou monastery. While the southern coast of Athos is generally quite rugged, the site upon which the monastery is built is exceptionally harsh. It is built on top of a single huge rock, practically hanging from a cliff 330 metres over the sea. It currently houses 54 monks. Its hegumen is Archimandrite Eliseus.

== History ==
The monastery was founded in the 13th century by Simon the Athonite, who was later sanctified by the Eastern Orthodox Church as Saint Simon the Myrrh-bearer. Tradition holds that Simon, while dwelling in a nearby cave, had a vision where the Theotokos instructed him to build a monastery on top of the rock, promising she would protect and provide for him and the monastery. Simon called the original monastery "New Bethlehem" (Greek: Νέα Βηθλεέμ); to this day, it is dedicated to the Nativity of Jesus.

In 1364, the Serbian despot Jovan Uglješa funded the monastery's renovation and expansion, issuing a royal chrysobull for it in 1368.

Russian pilgrim Isaiah wrote that, by the end of the 15th century, the monastery was Bulgarian.

In 1567, the arsanas (port building) of Simonopetra was completed. Its construction was funded by a Wallachian noble.

In 1581, Simonopetra was destroyed by a fire, in which a large portion of the monks died. Evgenios, the monastery's abbot traveled to the Danubian Principalities hoping to raise funds to rebuild the monastery. The most important donor was Michael the Brave, Prince of Wallachia, who donated large portions of land as well as money to the monastery. The monastery was also burnt in 1626, and the last great fire happened in 1891, after which the monastery was rebuilt in its current form, having been completed in 1902.

In recent centuries, the monks of the monastery were traditionally from Ionia in Asia Minor. However, during the mid-20th century, the brotherhood was greatly reduced by a reduction in the influx of new monks. The current brotherhood originates from the Holy Monastery of Great Meteoron in Meteora, when in 1973 Emilianos (Vafidis) (also known as Aimilianos of Simonopetra) and his monks moved into Simonopetra, hence repopulating the almost abandoned monastery. He served as Abbot of Simonopetra from 1974 until 2000.

20th-century saints associated with the monastery include Ieronymos of Simonopetra (d. 1957).

== Architecture ==
The monastery consists of several multi-storeyed buildings, the main being in the place of the original structure, built by Simon. The main building has been described as the "most bold construction of the peninsula". The monks of Simonopetra traditionally count the floors from top to bottom, thus the top floor is the first floor and the bottom floor the last. The monastery is built on top of the underlying massive rock, and the rock runs through the lower floors.

The expansion and development of Simon's original structure almost always followed one of the monastery's great fires. Following the 1580 fire and with the funds gathered by abbot Evgenios, the western building was erected. The eastern building was built following the 1891 fire mostly with funds raised in Russia.

== Choir ==
The choir of Simonopetra has grown in reputation among Byzantine music specialists and enthusiasts. The monastery has published a series of collections of ecclesiastic Byzantine chants by the choir. Of these, Agni Parthene is the most popular and has earned the choir and the monastery widespread recognition.

Recordings include:

- Hymns from the Psalter (1990)
- O Pure Virgin (Agni Parthene) (1990)
- Divine Liturgy (1999)
- Great Vespers (1999)
- Paraklesis (1999)
- Service of Saint Simon (1999)
- Sunday Matins (Orthros) (1999)
- Service of St. Silouan the Athonite (2004)

== Gallery ==
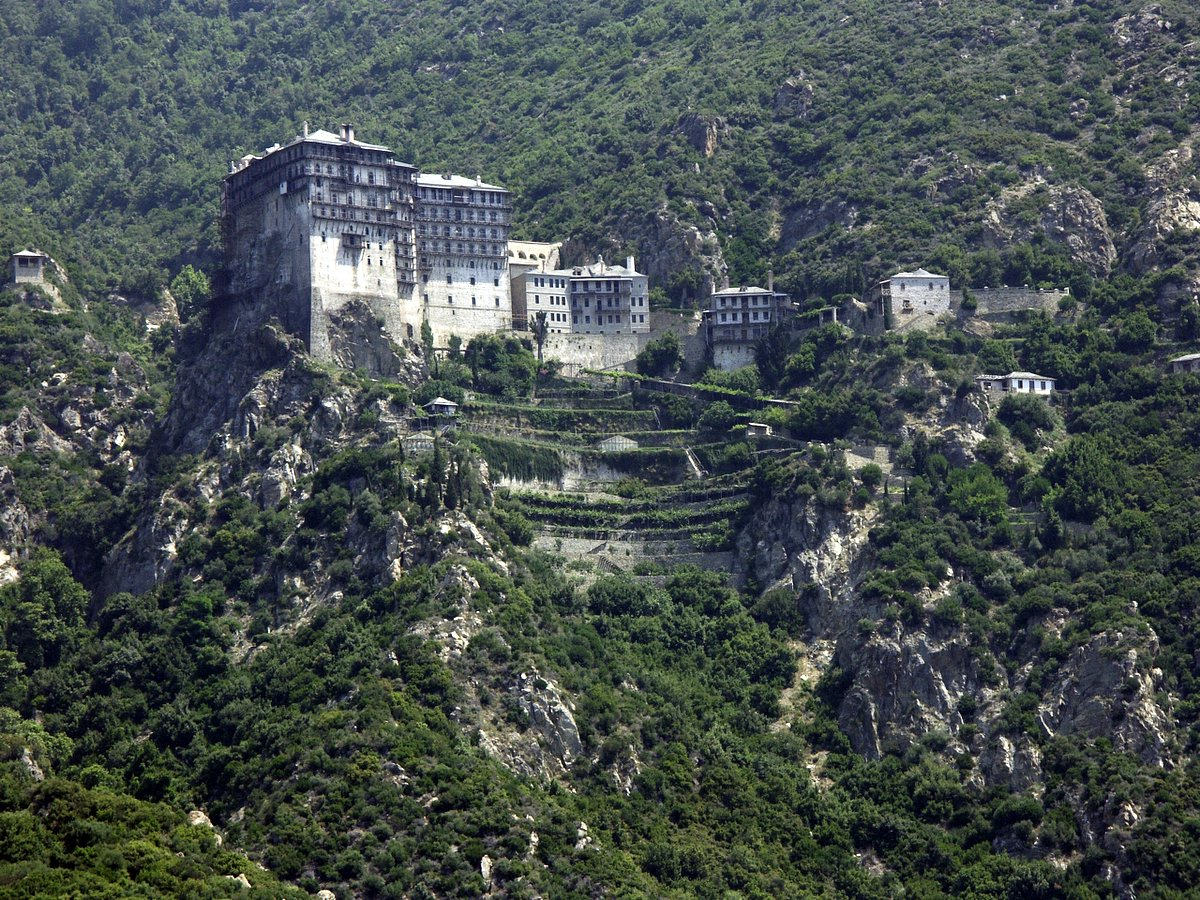
Simonopetra

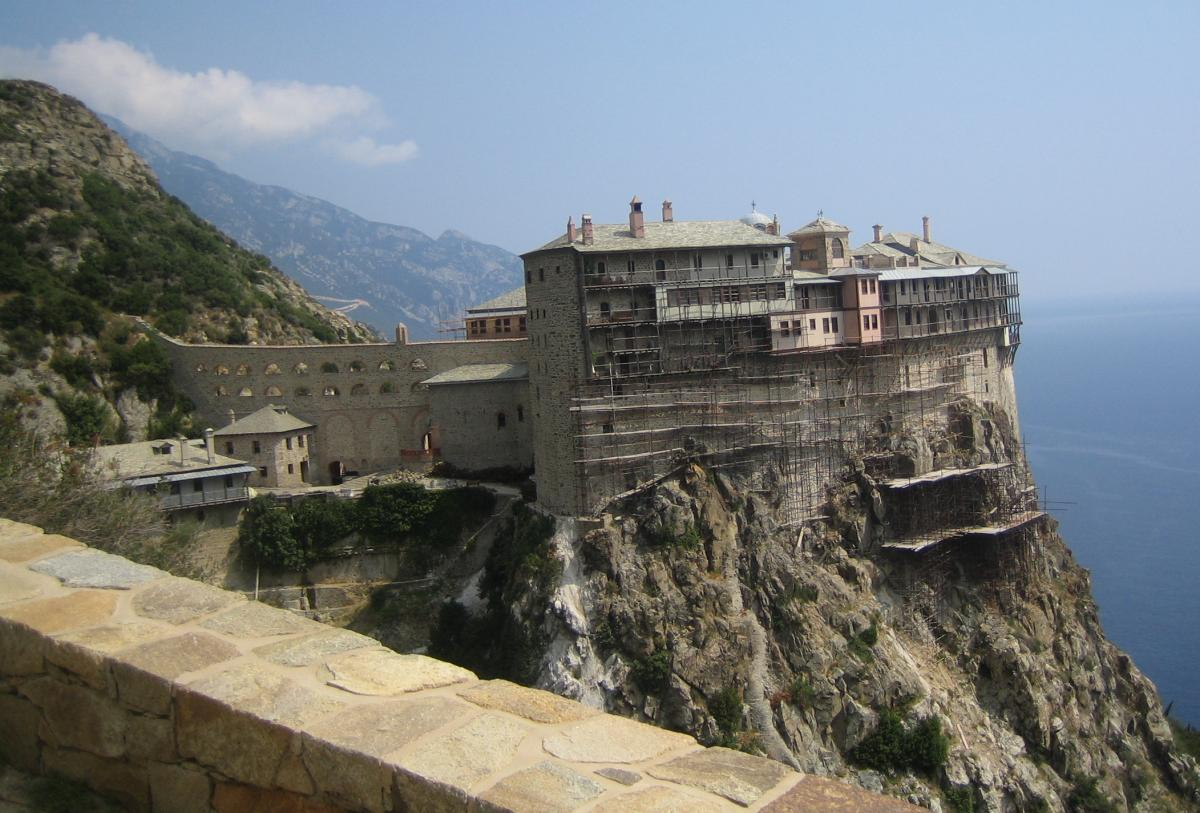
Simonopetra

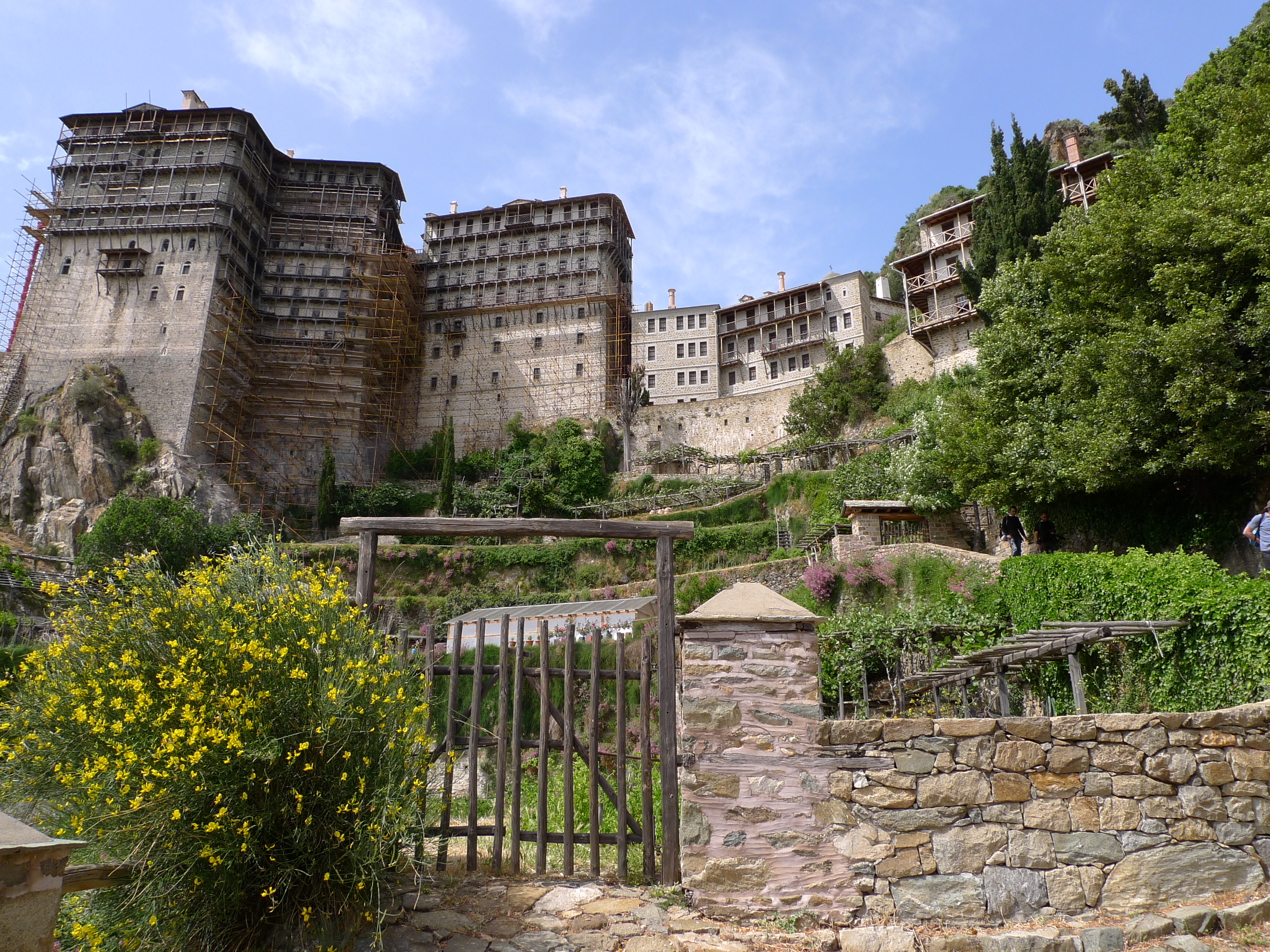
Simonopetra

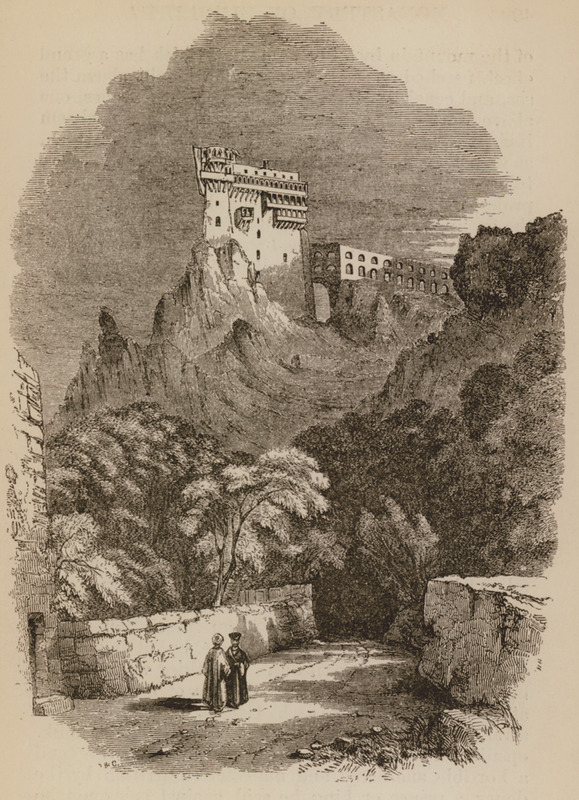
Monastery and Aqueduct of Simopetra, 1834

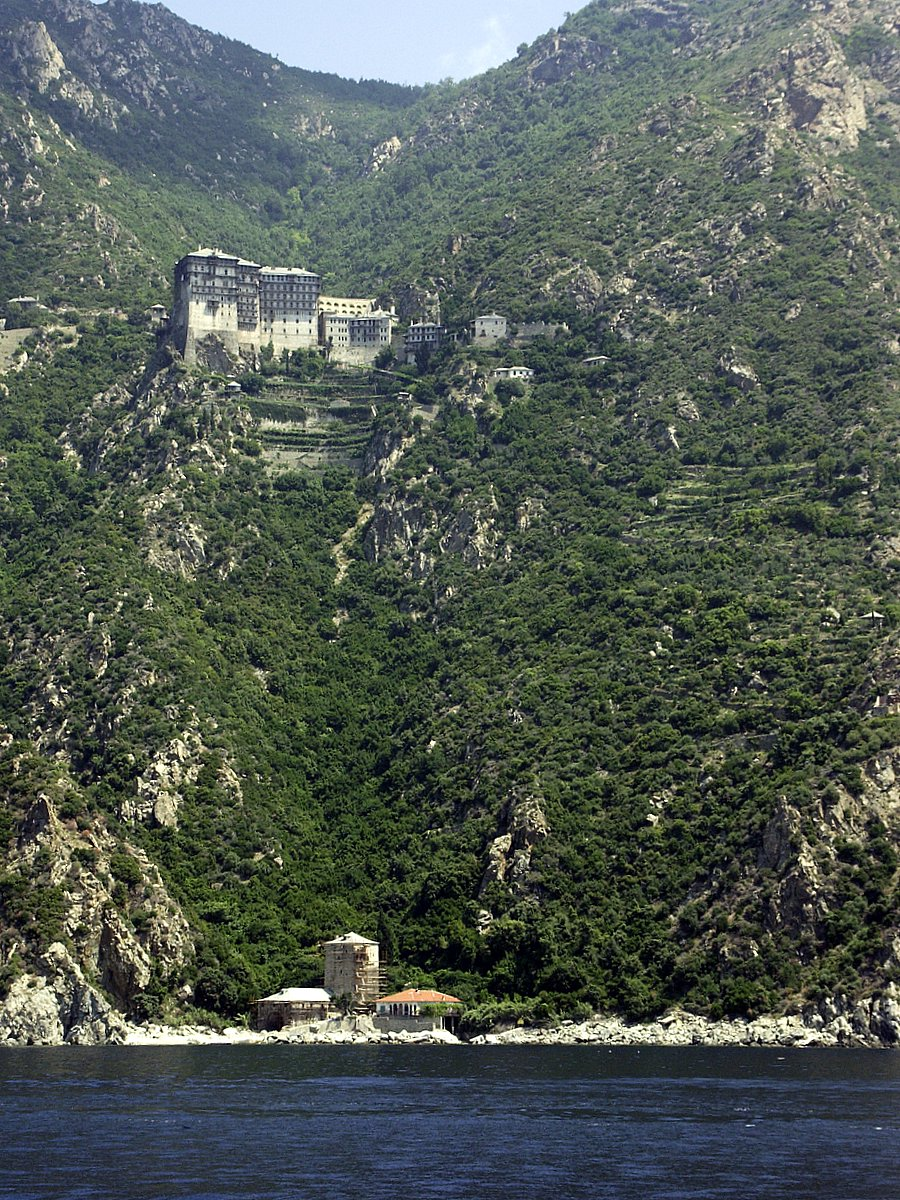
View of Simonopetra from the sea
