= Nektarios Antonopoulos =

Greek Orthodox bishop (b. 1952)

Nektarios of Argolis
- Metropolitan of Argos
- Archdiocese: Metropolis of Argolis (Ecumenical Patriarch of Constantinople)
- See: Argos
- Elected: October 18, 2013
- Installed: November 24, 2013
- Term ended: Incumbent
- Predecessor: Iakovos (Pakhis)

Orders
- Ordination: 1976 (deaconate); 1988 (priest); October 20, 2013 (bishop)

Personal details
- Born: January 1, 1952 (age 74) Marousi, Greece
- Denomination: Greek Orthodox
- Education: University of Athens

Nektarios (Greek: Αργολίδος Νεκτάριος), born Ioannis Antonopoulos (Greek: Ιωάννης Αντωνόπουλος; born January 1, 1952) is an Eastern Orthodox priest who is the Metropolitan of Argos since 2013.

== Biography ==
Antonopoulos was born Ioannis Antonopoulos on January 1, 1952, in Marousi, Greece. He attended the School of Theology at the University of Athens; after his military service he was tonsured a monk and ordained a deacon in 1976. In 1977 he resided at the Holy Monastery of the Transfiguration near Thebes, Greece. In 1983 he was ordained a presbyter and served under the Metropolis of Thebes and Livadeia as a preacher and head of the youth department. In 1991, he replaced the abbot of the Holy Monastery of Transfiguration, Archimandrite Nicodemus Badaloukas, due to the former resigning due to illness. Antonopoulos was elected on 18 October 2013 by the Hierarchy of the Church of Greece as Metropolitan of Argolis; he was enthroned on 24 November 2013, at the Metropolitan Church of Saint George in Nafplio. That same year he was awarded the Order of Merit of Ukraine in the third degree.

== Awards and honors ==
- Order of Merit (Ukraine)

== Bibliography ==
- Antonopoulos, Nektarios (2010). The Return (in Russian). Holy Trinity St. Sergius Lavra. ISBN 978-5-903102-48-8.
- Antonopoulos, Nektarios (2013). Saint Luke of Simferopol and Crimea: I Embraced Martyrdom: An Autobiography (in Greek). Porphyra Publications.
- Antonopoulos, Nektarios (2021). Návrat (in Slovak). Bratislava : Futurum primum. ISBN 978-80-971806-5-2.

Eastern Orthodox Church titles
Preceded by Iakovos (Pakhis)	Metropolitan of Argos; 2013 – Present	Succeeded by Incumbent
