= Saint-Maur Abbey =

Former religious institution in France, now park with historic ruins

Abbey of Saint-Maur
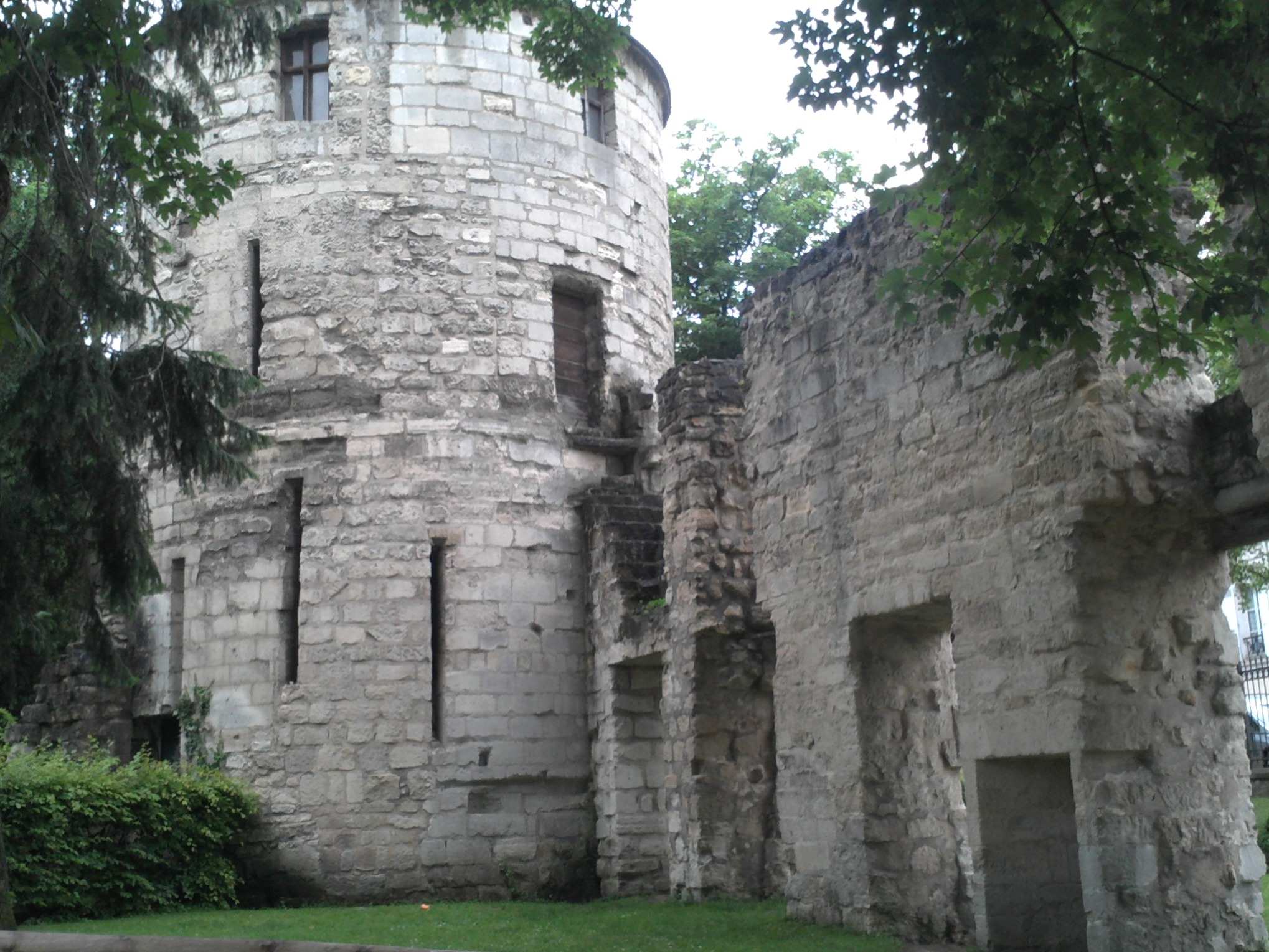
- La tour Rabelais
- Interactive map of Abbey of Saint-Maur
- Location: Val-de-Marne, Île-de-France, France
- Coordinates: 48°48′46″N 2°28′27″E
- Type: Abbey

Saint-Maur Abbey (French: Abbaye de Saint-Maur), originally called the Abbaye des Fossés, is a former abbey now subsumed in the Saint-Maur-des-Fossés suburb of Paris, France. The remains and the domain of the abbey have been transformed into a pleasure park named Parc de l'abbaye. The former abbey building has been replaced by a square at the corner of Avenue de Condé and Rue de l'Abbaye. Some ruins remain, such as the Rabelais tower, the 19th century Bourières villa and the old fortifications. The remains of the abbey have been classified as historical monuments since 13 June 1988.

== History ==
=== Foundation ===
An abbey with a church (known as "Abbatiale I"), it was built in 639, under the regency of Queen Nanthild, mother of Clovis II, on a ruined castrum, located in a peninsula formed by a meander of the Marne, on the territory of the future commune of Saint-Maur by a deacon of Paris named Blidegisilus. It took the name of "Saint-Pierre-du-Fossé" referring to the terrain of the place which is very steep up to the river. Babolein is mentioned as early as 9 May 641 as the first abbot. Audebert, bishop of Paris, refrained from intervening in the organization of the monastery in 643. In 658, the monastery received royal immunity from Clothar III. The oldest original documents in the abbey's archives are two charters, the first from 695 to 701 from Childebert IV and the second from 22 April 717. The Notre-Dame des Miracles chapel, whose ruins can still be seen in the "Parc de l'Abbaye", marks, according to tradition, the location of the primitive church where Babolein was buried.

=== Decadence and renaissance ===
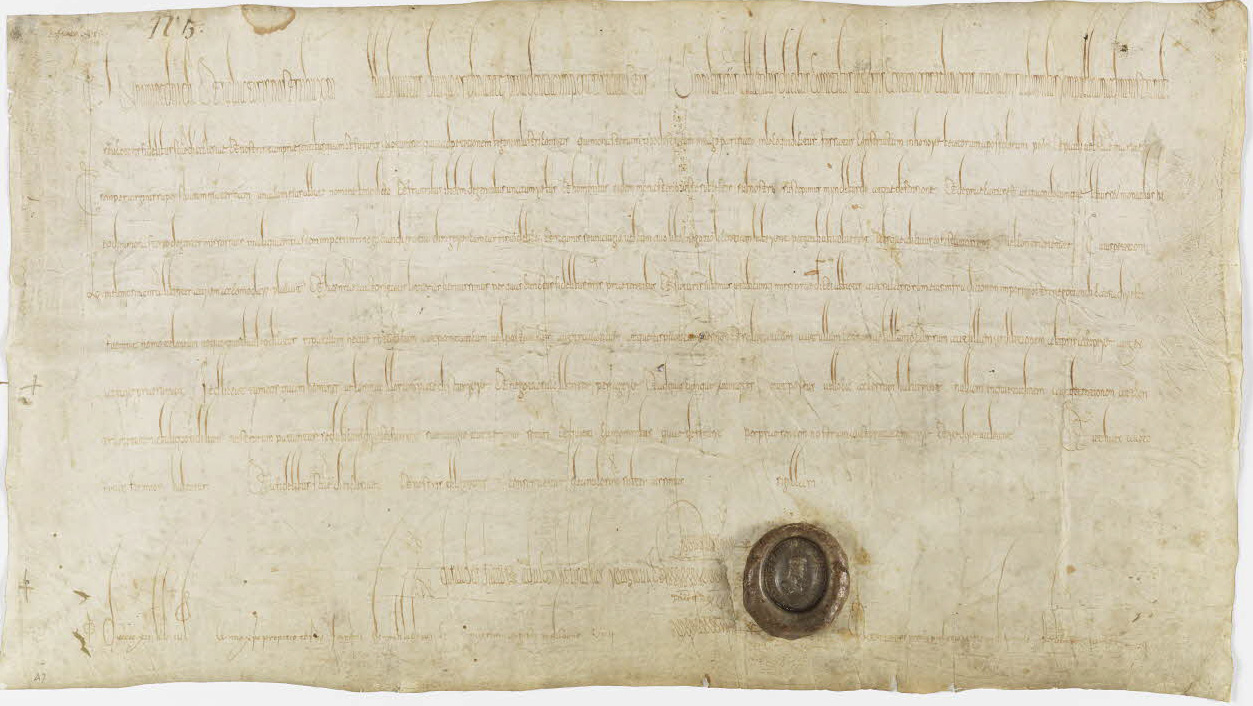
Exemption granted by Louis the Pious to the abbey of Saint-Maur-des-Fossés from all tolls and traffic rights dated 20 June 816. Archives nationales.

At the beginning of the 9th century, the abbey was one of the first to benefit from the vast reform imposed by Louis the Pious and the church (known as "Abbatiale II"), dedicated on 7 December 829, was rebuilt by Abbot Benedict (813–839), under the aegis of Count Beggo of Toulouse.

On 13 November 868, on the instructions of Charles the Bald, the abbey collected the relics of Saint Maurus from the Glanfeuil Abbey, near Saumur, which was threatened by the Vikings. Abbot Udon/Eudes I of Glanfeuil (died in 886), then became abbot of Saint-Maur and Glanfeuil became a priory. The "Abbatiale III" was rebuilt around 920 for the abbot Rainaud I by Count Hagano, favorite of Charles the Simple.

After the abbacy of Adhelnée around 925, Saint-Maur fell into decadence like many other abbeys and was in the hands of lay abbots, the counts of Paris: Hugh the Great, Hugh Capet and Bouchard le vénérable, who was also count of Vendôme, Montoire and Lavardin, then of Corbeil and Melun. The monastery was run by a certain "abbot" Mainard who preferred to train his monks to hunt dogs and falcons rather than devote himself to religious life. The monk Adic complained about these disturbances to Count Bouchard the Venerable, who in 989 entrusted the task of reforming the monastery to Saint Majolus of Cluny. Bouchard's son-in-law, Thibault I of Corbeil, abbot of Cormery, became regular abbot of Saint-Maur in 1005, the year of Bouchard the Venerable's death, and "Abbatiale IV" was solemnly rededicated on 13 November 1030 under Abbot Eudes II. It is a vast Romanesque pilgrimage church with a crypt under the choir and a triple nave of six bays with one or several bell towers.

=== Middle Ages ===
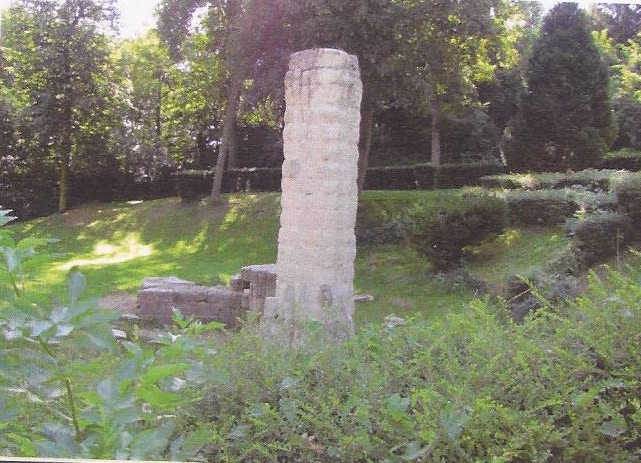
Remains of the abbey of Saint-Maur

In 1058 Guillaume Guerlenc count of Corbeil, became the advocatus of the abbey where he retired as a monk after taking a vow.

According to a medieval legend, on 10 July 1068 a certain Rumolde, a sculptor, left his workshop briefly to answer a call he thought he heard. When he returned, he found that the statue of the Virgin of the Annunciation in polychrome wood on which he had been working was finished. It is an "acheiropoietic" work known as Our Lady of Miracles "Virgo audiens"; conversions, graces and miracles have been attributed to her. It is now in a chapel in the parish church of Saint Nicholas.

In 1096, the Glanfeuil Abbey was lost as a result of the intrigues of Fulk IV, Count of Anjou who wanted to take revenge on King Philip I of France who had taken his wife Bertrade of Montfort. The abbacies of Thibaud II (1107–1134) and Ascelin I (1134–1153) are marked by an intense artistic activity, manuscripts, and ornamentation of the cloister; most of the preserved sculptures date from this period.

In 1134, the abbot of Ascelin I received from Stephen of Senlis, bishop of Paris, the abbey of Saint-Eloi en la cité which was attached to Saint-Maur. On this date, the Abbey of Saint-Maur became the owner of the domain of this abbey, which included the bourg Saint-Paul around the church of Saint-Paul-des-Champs, the agricultural land that extended from the site of the rue Saint-Antoine to the territory of the present 12th arrondissement of Paris and beyond to Charenton, and the exercise of the right of low, medium and high justice over the inhabitants.

In a 1136 bull of the Pope Innocent II, mention is made for the first time of the chapel Saint-Bon of Paris belonging to the abbey of Saint-Maur-des-Fossés.

On 14 July 1256 Pierre de Chevry, prior of Saint-Éloi, was elected abbot to replace Jean I of Auxonne (1251–1256) who had "shown himself to be detestable" and had been deposed. For 30 years, Pierre I de Chevry left a strong mark on the monastic life of Saint-Maur. He was the first of the mitred abbots of the monastery and like the bishops he wore a ring, a dalmatic and a crosier. He instituted new offices such as those of Chamberlain, Cellarer and Treasurer. In 1273 Abbot Pierre I had a new Polyptych begun, that is, a general inventory of the abbey's domains. In 1275 he had a Cartulary made, a collection of charters which, together with the Polyptych, formed a 600-page work known as the "Black Book". This document is a source of information on the customs and social organization of the 13th century. At his death on 5 June 1285, Pierre de Chevry was buried in the chapel of Saint Martin, which was open to the north transept of the abbey church and which he had had rebuilt. The reconstruction work in "Gothic" style of the choir and the chevet of the church, which now reaches 86 meters in length, was completed around 1281.

Around 1358, during the Hundred Years' War, the abbey sheltered the troops of the Dauphin, the future King Charles V. Fortifications were built, of which the western tower, known as the "Rabelais tower," remains today. In January 1378, Emperor Charles IV of the Holy Roman Empire, King of Bohemia, during a trip from Prague to visit his nephew Charles V, made a pilgrimage to Saint-Maur to cure his gout. He lived at the Abbey with his son and heir Wenceslaus and met the French king on 12 and 15 January. In 1430, the Armagnacs and then the English successively seized the abbey and pillaged it. In the 15th century, the abbot's residence in the abbey was the scene of the signing of two treaties:

- The first treaty of Saint-Maur was signed on 16 September 1418 in Saint-Maur-des-Fossés by, among others, John the Fearless and Isabeau of Bavaria. It was then presented by John V of Brittany to the Dauphin, who was then residing in Saumur. The regent certainly rejected this treaty.
- A second treaty of Saint-Maur was signed on 29 September 1465 between the king of France Louis XI and the great men of the kingdom who had revolted during the war of the League of the Public Weal.

=== End of the abbey ===
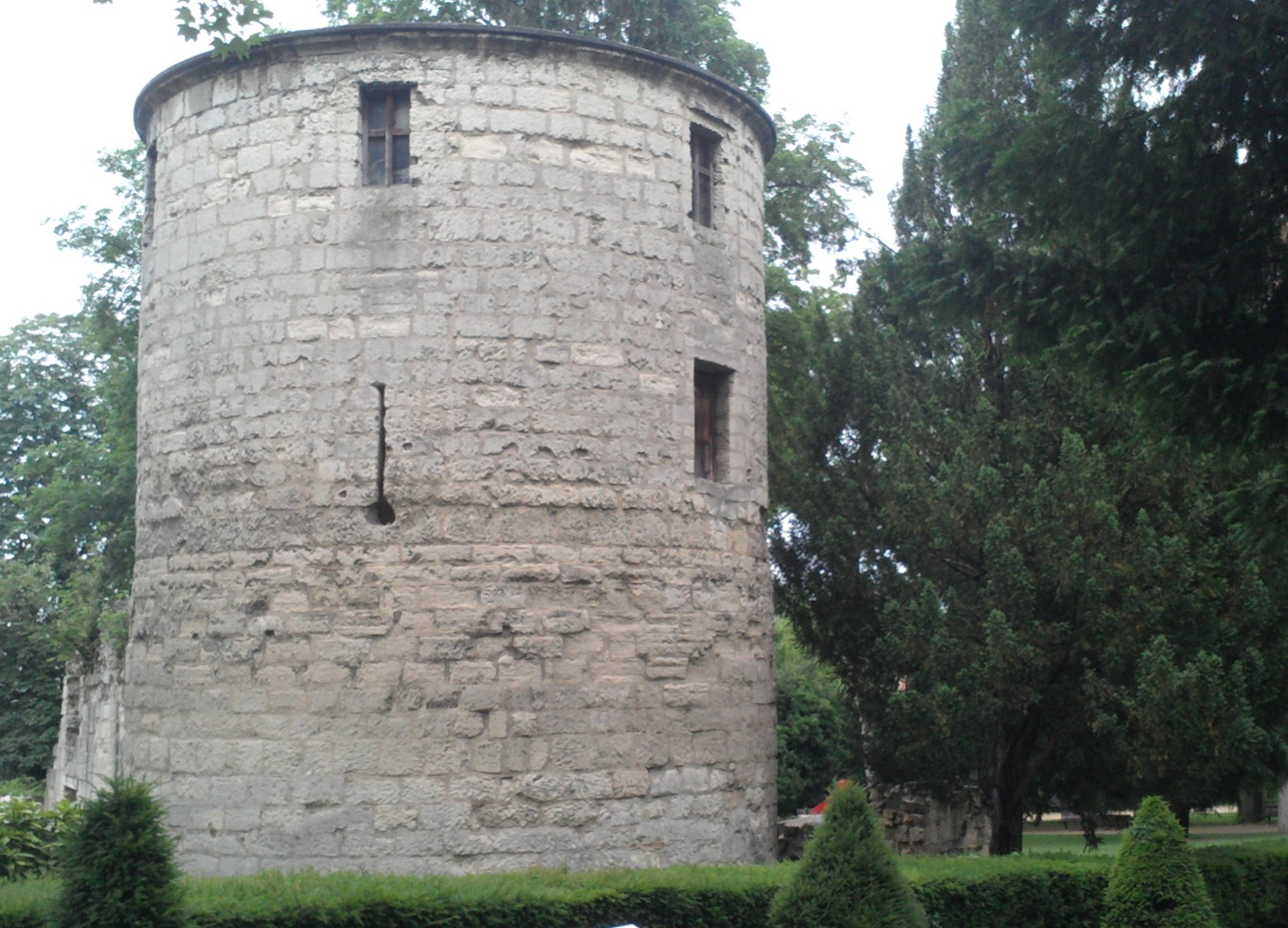
The Rabelais tower viewed from the exterior.

The abbey fell in commendam in 1493 to Raoul V du Fou, bishop of Évreux, before being secularized in 1533 by its last abbot, the cardinal and bishop of Paris, Jean du Bellay. It became a chapter of canons. It is there that the cardinal, who became the first dean, welcomed Rabelais in 1536. Accused of apostasy and irregularity, Rabelais was absolved by the pope but, by the brief of Paul III of 1536, had to commit himself to return to a Benedictine monastery of his choice and not to perform any more surgical operations. Cardinal du Bellay offered to receive him in the monastery of which he was the abbot. However, as the abbey had become a chapter of canons just before Rabelais came there, a new dispensation had to be requested from the pope to settle this problem of dates, and to allow Rabelais to regain his freedom legally.

From the 17th century, the buildings, badly maintained and badly managed, threatened to fall into ruin. In 1735 the archbishop of Paris prohibited the great pilgrimage of Saint John, then on 23 April 1749, Christophe de Beaumont, archbishop of Paris, decided to abolish the chapter and to attach it to that of Saint-Louis-du-Louvre. The buildings were sold in 1751 to the Prince of Condé and demolished. The Notre-Dame-des-Miracles chapel was closed during the French Revolution.

In 1858–1861, the owner of the site, Édouard Bourières, brought together the different parts of the site and had the side of the abbey church and the Romanesque crypt excavated. He transformed the canons' stables into a curious neo-renaissance villa which still exists. The estate, which had passed to Senator Adolphe Maujan, was given to the Dominican sisters who occupied it from 1920 to 1958 before selling it to the Caisse des Dépôts. The site was finally bought by the city of Saint-Maur in 1962.

Today, the abbey no longer exists and has been replaced by a square at the corner of avenue de Condé and rue de l'Abbaye. Some ruins remain, such as the Rabelais tower, the 19th century Bourières villa and the old fortifications. The remains of the abbey are classified as historical monuments since 13 June 1988.

=== Archaeological explorations ===
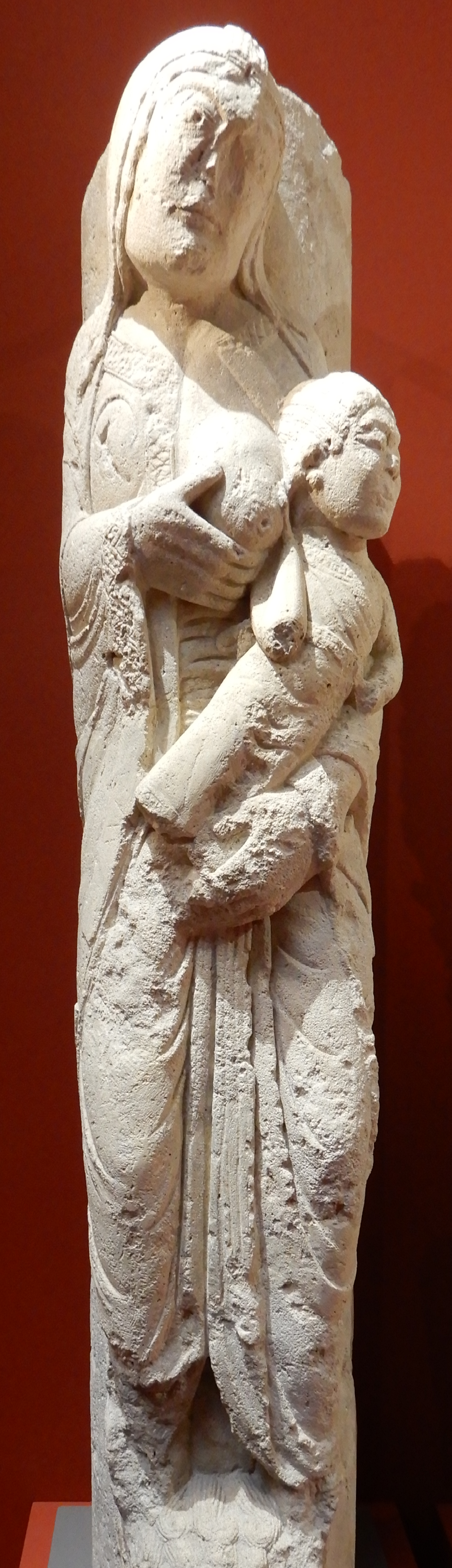
Saint Nicolas se détourne du sein de sa mère pour respecter le jeûne. Statue-colonne du cloître du XIIe siècle.

The excavation carried out in 1861 on the initiative of the former owner Bourières is the first of a series of more or less well carried out and documented interventions on the former abbey site, in the enclosure of the current park or to the north, now occupied by a medical-educational institute and a retirement home. The archaeological explorations or chance discoveries were carried out by various people (associations of the Vieux-Saint-Maur or other local archaeological associations, the Commission du Vieux-Paris, departmental archaeologists or those commissioned by the State Archaeological Service) throughout the 20th century Stéphane Ardouin, David Coxall, Sophie Benhaddou, Pascale Chardron-Picault et Philippe Huard, "L'abbaye médiévale de Saint-Mur-des-Fossés (Val-de-Marne), état des connaissances archéologiques," Actes du colloque de Créteil, Revue archéologique d'Île-de-France, supplément n°3, 2015, p. 175-190 ( ISSN 2101-3608).

The abbey church was the object of several successive interventions which allowed the excavation of Carolingian burials, burials in stone formwork of the 11th-13th centuries and the walls of the nave in 1933 and 1982, a glazed tile floor of the 13th century on the north of the choir in 1933 and 1967. The north of the choir and the nave of the abbey church were uncovered during surveys carried out in 1958-1959 and especially in 1988. The latter, the first to methodologically explore the entire stratigraphy of the site, brought to light Iron Age levels, well before the installation of the abbey, a few levels attributable to the early Middle Ages, including a Carolingian pit, and also traces of an 11th-century buttressed building (partly observed in 1983–1984), the function of which is undetermined, to the north of the choir of the abbey.

The primitive apse of the Notre-Dame-des-Miracles chapel was uncovered in 1967–1968. The northern part of the nave of this building, still partially elevated, was explored in 1970–1972. The nave of the chapel was partially excavated between 1980 and 1982 following the discovery of a funerary urn, revealing the paving and the clawed bases of the columns of the 12th century Romanesque apse building. This excavation allowed the discovery of a 14th-century glazed tile floor working with a new flat chevet replacing the old semi-circular Romanesque apse. This floor was later raised by a stoop, then abandoned and replaced by a pavement, pierced by some burials.

The abbey dwelling and part of the outbuildings were observed in 1966 during the supervision of the construction of a retirement home.

The cloister, whose decoration is partly known by a lapidary collection (three statues-columns and two twin chapiters) was explored during the surveys carried out in 1988.

The eastern cemetery, located outside the enclosure built in the 14th century, was explored in 1966–1969, 1970-1972 and again in 1983, revealing burials from the 11th-13th centuries, using stone forms, some of which had cephalomorphic features.

== Parc de l'abbaye ==
The parc de l'abbaye of Saint-Maur-des-Fossés is one of the most important green spaces of the city. It is regularly used for festive events, including: the festival "Courts dans l'Herbe" (2005 to 2009), "Saint-Maur Médiéval" which takes place every year in May, as well as the European Heritage Days organized every year in September.
