= O Virgin Pure =

Greek Orthodox chant

Agni Parthene (Greek: Ἁγνὴ Παρθένε), rendered "O Virgin Pure" or "O Pure Virgin", is a Greek Marian hymn composed by St. Nectarios of Aegina in the late 19th century, first published in print in his Theotokarion (Θεοτοκάριον, ἤτοι προσευχητάριον μικρόν) in 1905.

In Orthodox churches, it is considered a paraliturgical hymn and therefore only to be used outside of liturgical services. However, it is often performed by some choirs as a recessional after the conclusion of the Divine Liturgy during the veneration of the cross and receiving of antidoron.

== St. Nectarios' poem ==
St. Nectarios of Aegina was ordained a Bishop of the Greek Orthodox Church in the late 1800s. Throughout the period of his episcopacy, he spent much time in prayer and contemplation, and dedicated himself to the monastic life. His spiritual lifestyle, and his particular dedication to the Virgin Mary, inspired him to write a wide variety of religious poetry, much of which was published during his life, and after his death in 1920.

One of the many poems he wrote is "Agni Parthene" or "O Virgin Pure". According to a tradition passed down on the island of Aegina, St. Nectarios reportedly composed the text for this poem after having seen a vision of the Theotokos in a dream where she asked him to record this poem. The poem was written much like a canon in that it has nine odes. The original script can still be viewed on his prayer table in his bedroom at this monastery.

It was later published as a poetic hymn for non-liturgical use and private edification in his publication called "Theotokarion of Odes & Hymns for the Most-Holy Theotokos and Ever-Virgin Mary" of 1905, which included many other similar poems. Additionally, selected verses from the poem including the refrain were set to Byzantine musical notation by the Simonopetra Monastery of Mount Athos in Greece. The result was the hymn "Virgin Pure" in Byzantine Greek. The monastery published the work in a book titled Ψαλτήριον Τερπνὸν (Psaltirion Terpnon, "The Pleasant Psaltery").

== Contemporary practice ==
The hymn, although not used very often in Simonopetra Monastery, nevertheless spread quickly throughout the Eastern Orthodox world and has been translated into many languages, including English. It is most commonly performed as a concert piece in Greece, and as a recessional hymn after liturgical services in parishes throughout the United States, particularly services dedicated to the Theotokos, such as the Akathist during Great Lent.

The explosion in popularity has been attributed to St. Nectarios of Aegina becoming a popular modern-day saint.

A controversial practice has been the use of the hymn as a communion hymn and as a hymn to begin Vespers services. However, Fr. Gregory and his brethren of Simonopetra Monastery have clarified that although it has become popular, it was never meant to be used liturgically, but rather to be sung only as a non-liturgical religious song for the edification of individuals.

A Church Slavonic version was translated by monks of Valaam Monastery.

A Russian virtual rendition of this hymn was recently performed.

The text is in 24 stanzas or invocations, each followed by the refrain Χαῖρε νύμφη ἀνύμφευτε "Hail, unwedded bride". The 24 stanzas are arranged into four strophes, each strophe consisting of three tunes iterated twice over. The first three strophes describe attributes of the Theotokos, while the fourth consists of a prayer for intercession.

== Text ==
The 24 invocations are labelled by strophe (1, 2, 3, 4), tune (A, B, Γ) and iteration (α, β).

| Greek text (1905) | Transliteration (phonemic) | English translation (metrical) |
|---|---|---|
| 1.Aα. Ἁγνὴ Παρθένε Δέσποινα, ἄχραντε Θεοτόκε, R: Χαῖρε νύμφη ἀνύμφευτε. 1.Aβ. Παρθένε μήτηρ ἄνασσα, πανένδροσέ τε πόκε. R 1.Bα. Ὑψηλοτέρα οὐρανῶν ἀκτίνων λαμπροτέρα, R 1.Bβ. Χαρὰ παρθενικῶν χορῶν ἀγγέλων ὑπερτέρα. R 1.Γα. Ἐκλαμπροτέρα οὐρανῶν, φωτὸς καθαρωτέρα, R 1.Γβ. Τῶν οὐρανίων στρατιῶν, πασῶν ἁγιωτέρα. R | Agní Parthéne Déspina, Ákhrante Theotóke, R: Khére Nímfi Anímfevte. Parthéne Mítir Ánassa, Panéndrosé te póke. R Ipsilotéra uranón, aktínon lamprotéra, R Khará parthenikón khorón, angélon ipertéra, R Eklamprotéra uranón, fotós katharotéra, R Ton Uraníon stratión, pasón agiotéra. R | O pure and virgin Lady,/ O spotless Theotokos; R: Rejoice, O unwedded Bride! O Virgin Queen and Mother/ O dewy fleece most sacred O height transcending heaven above/ O beam of light most radiant O joy of chaste and virgin maids/ surpassing all the angels O brilliant light of heaven above/ most clear and most radiant Commanding chief of heavenly hosts/ O holiest of holies |
| 2.Aα. Μαρία ἀειπάρθενε κόσμου παντὸς Κυρία, R 2.Aβ. Ἄχραντε νύμφη πάναγνε, Δέσποινα Παναγία. R 2.Bα. Μαρία νύμφη ἄνασσα, χαρᾶς ἡμῶν αἰτία, R 2.Bβ. Κόρη σεμνή, Βασίλισσα, Μήτηρ ὑπεραγία. R 2.Γα. Τιμιωτέρα Χερουβείμ, ὑπερενδοξοτέρα, R 2.Γβ. Τῶν ἀσωμάτων Σεραφείμ, τῶν θρόνων ὑπερτέρα. R | María aipárthene kósmu pantós Kiría, R Ákhrante Nímfi Pánagne, Déspina Panagía, R María Nímfi Ánassa, kharás imón etía, R Korí semní Vasílissa, Mítir iperagía, R Timiotéra Kheruvím, iperendoksotéra R Ton asomáton Serafím, ton thrónon ipertéra. R | O ever-virgin Mary/ O Mistress of creation O Bride all-pure and spotless/ O Lady all-holy O holy Mary, Bride and Queen/ and cause of our rejoicing O Maiden Queen most hon'rable/ O Mother most holy More precious than the cherubim/ more glorious than the seraphim Surpassing principalities/ dominions, thrones and powers |
| 3.Aα. Χαῖρε τὸ ᾆσμα Χερουβείμ, χαῖρε ὕμνος ἀγγέλων, R 3.Aβ. Χαῖρε ᾠδὴ τῶν Σεραφείμ, χαρὰ τῶν ἀρχαγγέλων. R 3.Bα. Χαῖρε εἰρήνη καὶ χαρά, λιμὴν τῆς σωτηρίας, R 3.Bβ. Παστὰς τοῦ Λόγου ἱερά, ἄνθος τῆς ἀφθαρσίας. R 3.Γα. Χαῖρε παράδεισε τρυφῆς, ζωῆς τε αἰωνίας. R 3.Γβ. Χαῖρε τὸ ξύλον τῆς ζωῆς, πηγὴ ἀθανασίας. R | Khére to ásma Kheruvím, khére ímnos angélon, R Khére odí ton Serafím, khará tón Arkhangélon, R Khére iríni ke khará, limín tis sotirías, R Pastás tu Lógu ierá, ánthos tis aftharsías, R Khére Parádise trifís, zoís te eonías, R Khére to ksílon tis zoís, pigí athanasías. R | Rejoice, song of the cherubim/ Rejoice, hymn of the angels Rejoice, ode of the seraphim/ and joy of the archangels Rejoice, O peace; Rejoice, O joy/ and haven of salvation O bridal chamber of the Word/ unfading, fragrant blossom Rejoice, delight of paradise/ Rejoice, life everlasting Rejoice, O holy tree of life/ and fount of immortality |
| 4.Aα. Σὲ ἱκετεύω Δέσποινα, σὲ νῦν ἐπικαλοῦμαι. R 4.Aβ. Σὲ δυσωπῶ Παντάνασσα, σὴν χάριν ἐξαιτοῦμαι. R 4.Bα. Κόρη σεμνὴ καὶ ἄσπιλε, Δέσποινα Παναγία, R 4.Bβ. Επάκουσόν μου, άχραντε, κόσμου παντός Κυρία, R 4.Γα. Ἀντιλαβοῦ μου, ρῦσαί με ἀπὸ τοῦ πολεμίου R 4.Γβ. Καὶ κληρονόμον δεῖξόν με ζωῆς τῆς αἰωνίου. R | Se iketévo Déspina, se nin epikalúme, R Se disopó Pantánassa, sin khárin eksetúme. R Kóri semní ke áspile, Déspina Panagía, R Epákusón mu, ákhrante, kósmu pantós Kiría, R Antilavú mu, rísé me apó tu polemíu, R Ke klironómon díksón me zoís tis eoníu. R | I supplicate thee, Lady/ I humbly call upon thee O Queen of all, I beg thee/ to grant me thy favor O spotless and most honored maid/ O Lady all holy Hear me, immaculate one/ lady of the whole world O thou my help, deliver me/ from harm and all adversity And by thy prayers show me to be/ an heir of immortality |

Church Slavonic variant

Марие, Дево Чистая, Пресвятая Богородице,
R: Радуйся, Невесто Неневестная.
Царице, Мати Дево, Руно, всех покрывающее, R
Превысшая Небесных Сил, нетварное сияние, R
Ликов девичьих Радосте и Ангелов Превысшая, R
Небес Честная Сило и Свете, паче всех светов, R
Честнейшая Владычице всех Небесных Воинств, R
Всех Праотцев Надеждо, пророков Исполнение, R
В подвизех Ты помоще, Кивоте Бога Слова, R
И девам Ликование, и матерем Отрадо, R
Целомудрия Наставнице, душ наших Очищение, R
Покрове, ширший облака, и страждущих Пристанище, R
Немощных Покров и Заступнице, Надеждо ненадежных, R
Марие, Мати Христа, Истиннаго Бога, R
Ааронов Жезле прозябший, Сосуде тихой радости, R
Всех сирых и вдов Утешение, в бедах и скорбех помоще, R
Священная и Непорочная Владычице Всепетая, R
Приклони ко мне милосердие Божественнаго Сына, R
Ходатаице спасения, припадая, взываю Ти, R

== See also ==
- Axion Estin
- Litany of the Blessed Virgin Mary
