= Agios Nilos, Mount Athos =

Agios Nilos Άγιος Νείλος
- Settlement
- Location within Greece
- Coordinates: 40°07′48″N 24°19′03″E
- Country: Greece
- Administrative region: Mount Athos

Population (2021)
  - Total: 20
- Time zone: UTC+2 (EET)
  - Summer (DST): UTC+3 (EEST)

Agios Nilos (also spelled Agios Neilos; Greek: Άγιος Νείλος) is the name of an area of Mount Athos that belongs to the Monastery of Great Lavra. It is located on the southeastern side of Mount Athos. It is named after Saint Nilos the Myrrh-streamer, who was a hermit in the cell of the Virgin Mary that now bears his name. Today the monks at Agios Nilos are engaged in hagiography and handicrafts.

The Cave of Saint Nilos the Myrrh-streamer, also known as the Cave of Saint Petra of the Virgin Mary, is located in a location called Perdiki.
