= Nectarios of Aegina =

Metropolitan of Pentapolis and Eastern Orthodox Saint (1846–1920)

Saint Nectarios of Aegina
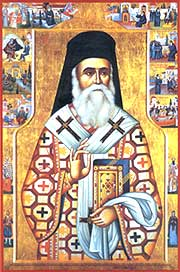
- Greek Icon of Saint Nectarios Metropolitan of Pentapolis

Archbishop and Wonderworker of Aegina
- Born: Anastasios Kephalas; 1 October 1846; Selymbria, Constantinople Vilayet, Ottoman Empire
- Died: 8 November 1920 (aged 74); Aegina, Kingdom of Greece
- Resting place: Aegina, Greece
- Venerated in: Eastern Orthodox Church
- Canonized: 20 April 1961, Saint George's Cathedral, Istanbul, Turkey by the Patriarch Athenagoras I of Constantinople
- Major shrine: Agios Nectarios Monastery, Aegina, Greece
- Feast: 9 November [O.S. 22 November]
- Attributes: Wearing a sakkos, omophorion worn about his shoulder, holding a book and epanokalimavkion.
- Patronage: Aegina, people suffering from diseases
- Major works: Agni Parthene

Nectarios of Aegina (Note: Also known as Nektarios of Egina, he was baptized as Anastasios Kefalas (Αναστάσιος Κεφαλάς).) (Greek: Νεκτάριος Αιγίνης; 1 October 1846 – 8 November 1920), Metropolitan of Pentapolis and Wonderworker of Aegina, is one of the most renowned Greek saints, venerated in the Eastern Orthodox Church. On 20 April 1961, Patriarch Athenagoras I of Constantinople glorified him as a saint. His feast day is celebrated every year on 9 November.

== Life ==
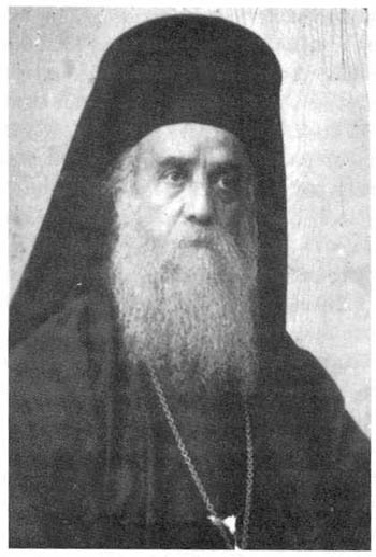
Portrait of Saint Nectarios of Aegina

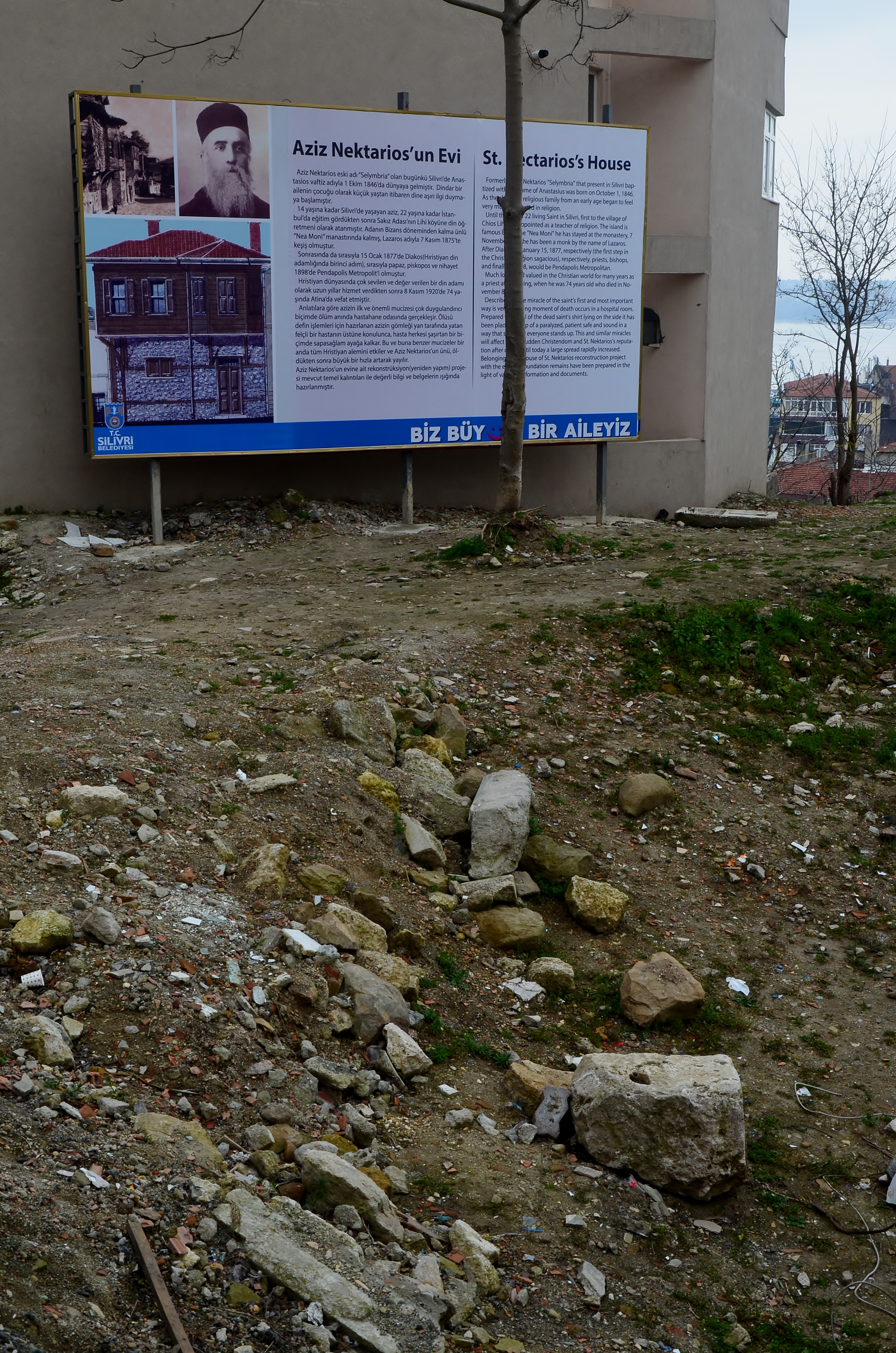
Site of Saint Nectarios birth house in Silivri, Istanbul, Turkey

Anastasios Kephalas (Greek: Αναστάσιος Κεφαλάς), later Nectarios, was born on 1 October 1846 in Selymbria, to a poor family. His parents, Dimos and Maria Kephalas, were pious Christians but not wealthy.

At the age of 14, he moved to Constantinople, modern-day Istanbul, to work and further his education. In 1866, at age 20, he moved to the island of Chios to take a teaching post. On November 7, 1876, he became a monk, at age 30, in the Monastery of Nea Moni, for he had long wished to embrace the ascetic life.

Three years after becoming a monk, he was ordained a deacon, taking the name Nectarios. He graduated from the University of Athens in 1885. Following his graduation he went to Alexandria, Egypt, where he was ordained a priest and served the Church of Saint Nicholas in Cairo. He was consecrated Metropolitan bishop of Pentapolis (an ancient Diocese in Cyrenaica, in what is now Libya) by the Greek Orthodox Patriarch Sophronios in 1889.

He served as a bishop in Cairo for one year. Nectarios was very popular with the people, which gave rise to jealousy among his colleagues. They were able to persuade his superior that Nectarios had ambitions to displace the Patriarch. Nectarios was suspended from his post without explanation. He then returned to Greece in 1891, and spent several years as a preacher (1891–1894). He was then director of the Rizarios Ecclesiastical School for the education of priests in Athens for fifteen years.

In 1904, at the request of several nuns, he established Holy Trinity Monastery for them on the island of Aegina. Nectarios ordained two women as deaconesses in 1911. Up to the 1950s, a few Greek Orthodox nuns also became monastic deaconesses. In 1986, Christodoulos, the Metropolitan of Demetrias and later Archbishop of Athens and all of Greece, ordained a woman as deacon in accordance with the "ritual of Saint Nectarios" (the ancient Byzantine text Nectarios had used).

In December 1908, at the age of 62, Nectarios resigned from his post as school director and withdrew to the Holy Trinity Convent on Aegina, where he lived out the rest of his life as a monk. He wrote, published, preached, and heard confessions. He also tended the gardens, carried stones, and helped with the construction of the monastery buildings that were built with his own funds.

Nectarios died on November 8, 1920, at the age of 74, following hospitalization for prostate cancer and two months of treatment. His body was taken to the Holy Trinity Convent, where he was buried by his best friend Savvas of Kalymnos, who later painted the first icon of Nectarios. The funeral of Nectarios was attended by multitudes of people from all parts of Greece and Egypt.

Saint Nektarios is considered a patron saint for people who are suffering from diseases; such as cancer, heart trouble, joint pain, epilepsy, arthritis, etc.

== Veneration ==
The relics of Nectarios were removed from his grave on 2 September 1953. On 20 April 1961, Patriarch Athenagoras I of Constantinople glorified Nectarios as a saint in Saint George's Cathedral, Istanbul. The feast day of Saint Nectarios is celebrated every year on 9 November.

== Decision of Holy Synod of the Patriarchate of Alexandria ==
Church of Agios Nectarios, Aegina

On September 15, 1998, the Greek Orthodox Patriarchate of Alexandria and all Africa restored the ecclesiastical order of Nectarios:

Alexandria 15th September 1998

The Holy Spirit has enlightened the gathered members of the Holy Synod of the Patriarchate of Alexandria and all Africa, under the leadership of H.B. Petros VII, Pope and Patriarch of Alexandria and all Africa, more than a century since Saint Nektarios, the great Teacher and Father of the Holy Eastern Orthodox Church was expelled from the Church of Alexandria, to reach the following decision:

Taking into account the resolution of the Church to rank Saint Nektarios amongst the saints because of his innumerable miracles and his acceptance within the religious conscience of Orthodox Christians throughout the world, we appeal to the mercy of the ever-charitable God.

We hereby restore the ecclesiastical order of the Saint of our Century, Saint Nektarios, and grant to him all due credits and honours. We beseech Saint Nektarios to forgive both us, unworthy as we are, and our predecessors, our brothers of the Throne of Alexandria, for opposition to the Saint and for all which, due to human weakness or error, our Holy Father, Bishop of Pentapolis, Saint Nektarios, suffered.

PETROS VII, By the Grace of God

Pope and Patriarch of Alexandria and All Africa.

== Works ==
Translated into English

- Repentance and Confession, 2nd Printing - 2011, ISBN 0-9725504-0-2 (Translated and Published by St. Nektarios Monastery, Roscoe, NY).
- Christology, 2nd Printing - 2012, ISBN 0-9725504-1-0 (Translated and Published by St. Nektarios Monastery, Roscoe, NY).

== In popular media ==
The life of Nectarios was depicted in the 2021 film Man of God, written and directed by Yelena Popovic.

== See also ==
- "Agni Parthene" ("O Virgin Pure"), a hymn composed by Nectarios of Aegina
- St. Nectarios Church
