= Simon the Athonite =

13th-century Orthodox monk

Simon the Athonite (died 1287) was an Orthodox monk of the 13th century, later sanctified by the Eastern Orthodox Church as Saint Simon the Myroblyte.

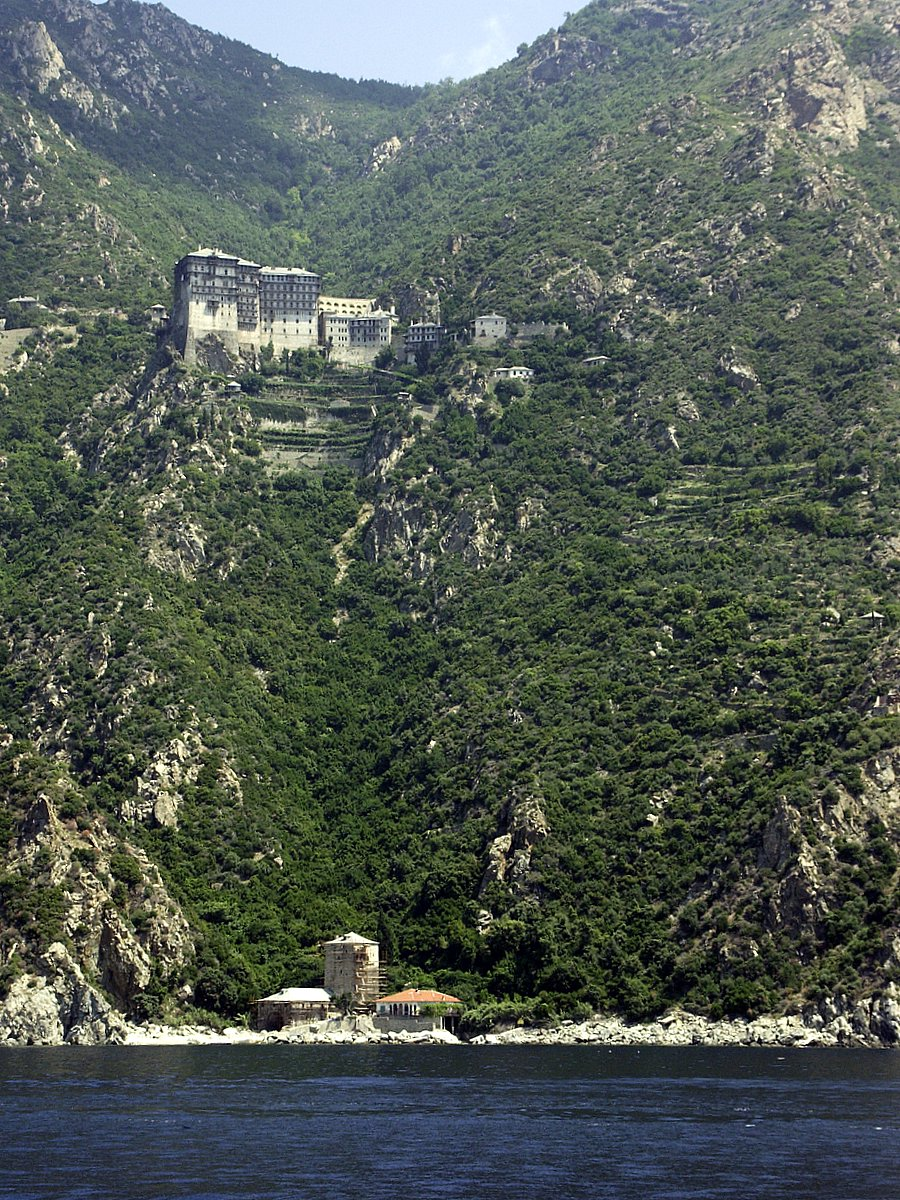
Simonopetra today

His feast day is 28 December.

== Date of birth ==
Simon's date of birth is uncertain, but he has been described as being of the second half of the thirteenth century, and the monastery's records state that he died in 1287. However, the British Museum adventurously suggests his life as c. 1200 to c. 1300.

== Life ==
Simon was a hermit living in a cave on Mount Athos near the rock now known as Simonopetra, or Simon's Rock. In a dream, the Theotokos called on him to build a monastery on the rock, promising to protect it and to look after him and the monastery. Another version is that one night he saw a star so bright that he identified it with the Star of Bethlehem. Watching it over several nights, he saw it stay motionless, at first thinking it was a demonic temptation, but on Christmas Eve the star stood over a high rock and a voice said "Here, Simon, you must lay the foundations of your monastery for the salvation of souls." So he built the monastery and gave it the name of New Bethlehem (Greek: Νέα Βηθλεέμ). It remains dedicated to the Nativity of Jesus.

Simon died, or reposed, in 1287, and was later glorified by many miracles, leading to his beatification. His holy relics are reported to exude myrrh, giving him the alternative names of Myrrhbearer or Myrrhgusher.

The date of foundation claimed by his monastery is 1267.
