= Saint Glyceria =

Greek saint

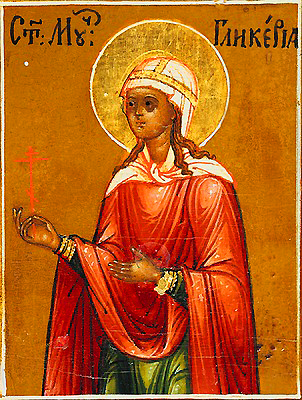
- Icon depicting St. Glyceria

Virgin and martyr
- Born: Roman Empire
- Died: c. 177; Perinthus, Propontis (modern-day Marmara Ereğlisi, Tekirdağ, Turkey)
- Venerated in: Roman Catholic Church, Eastern Orthodox Church
- Canonized: Pre-Congregation
- Feast: 13 May

Saint Glyceria (Greek: Γλυκερία; died c. 177) was a Roman virgin of the early church.

According to Christian tradition, she was forced to pay tribute to a stone statue of Jupiter but it was destroyed while she stood before it. The virgin was imprisoned for this, then sentenced to be torn apart by wild animals. She, however, was not torn apart. Before the animals could render her any harm, Glyceria died a virgin martyr in Heraclea. Her relics reputedly poured forth the substance known as the Oil of Saints, and her name means "sweetness". Theophylact Simocatta and John of Nikiu report that the flow of sacred oil was temporarily stopped when a silver basin which was used for witchcraft by a man named Paulinus was used to receive it. This event led to Paulinus and his sons execution and removal of the bowl at which time the oil resumed flowing.

She is primarily recognized as a saint in Eastern Christianity and the Catholic Church. Her feast day is 13 May in Eastern Orthodox liturgics.
