= Peter the Wonderworker =

Saint Peter the Wonderworker
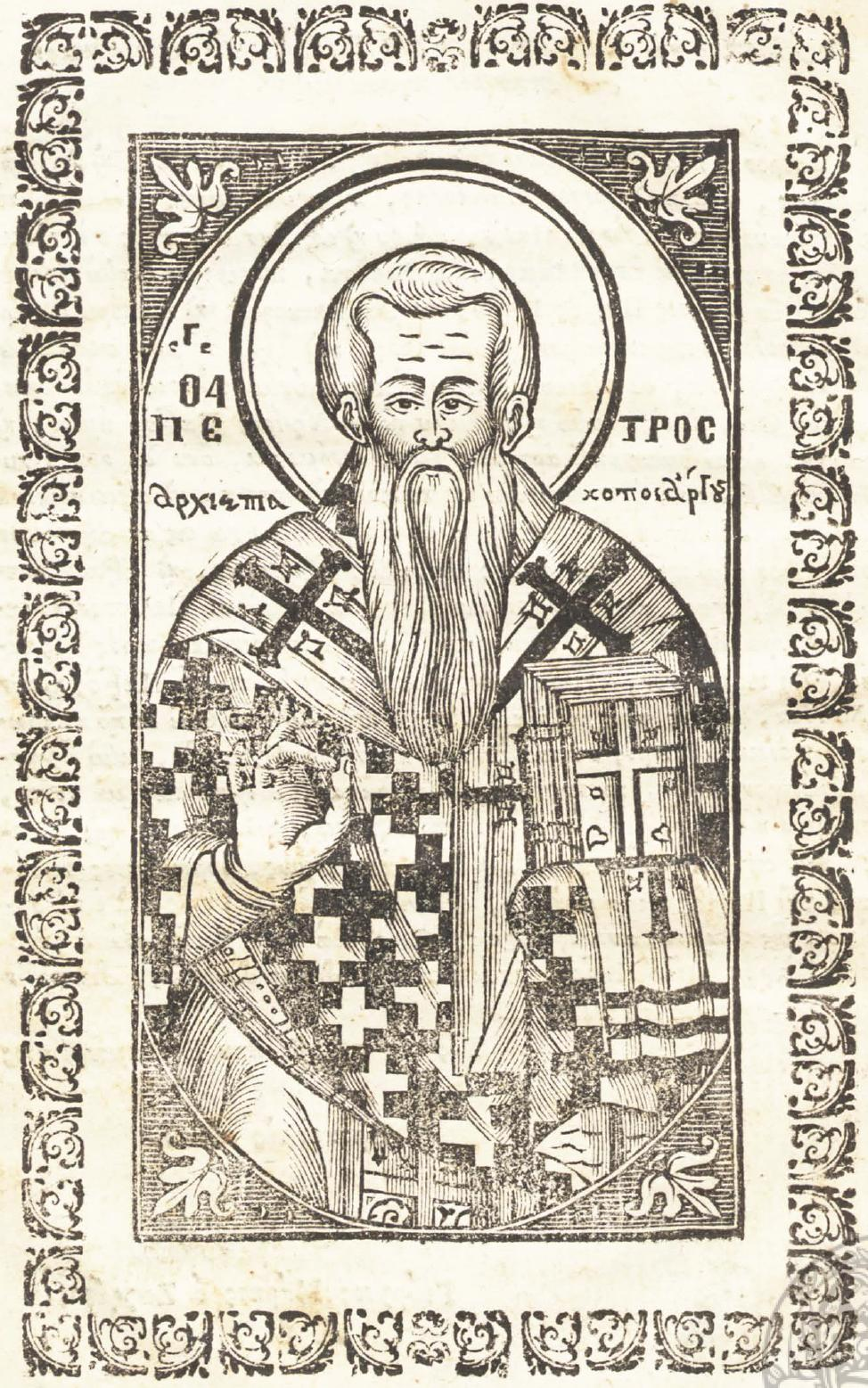
- Icon of Peter the Wonderworker of Argos

Bishop of Argos and Nauplion, Wonderworker, Venerable
- Born: Constantinople (modern-day Istanbul, Turkey)
- Died: Argos
- Venerated in: Eastern Orthodoxy
- Major shrine: Saint Peter's, Argos
- Feast: 3 May
- Attributes: Vested as a bishop, holding a Gospel Book, right hand raised in blessing, making the Christogram IC XC.
- Patronage: Argos

Saint Peter the Wonderworker or the Thaumaturge (Greek: Άγιος Πέτρος ο Θαυματουργός, Latin: Petrus Thaumaturgus), also known as Saint Peter of Argos (Άγιος Πέτρος του Άργους) is a Christian saint, regarded as the patron saint of Argos.

== Life ==
He was born in Constantinople, to a well-to-do family noted for its piety and philanthropy. In his family there were five brothers, all of them holding a great affinity for Christianity and who together with their parents helped the poor. From them, Peter heard a calling to the monastic life.

Patriarch Nicholas Mystikos wished to make him the Bishop of Corinth, but he demurred in favor of his brother, Paul, as he wished to remain a monk. Later, however, Peter became Bishop of Argos and Nauplion after the local bishop died, where he was credited with great holiness and his efforts to organize famine relief in times of crop failure, the ransom of captives, and healing the sick. The supplies of food that he dedicated to famine relief never ran out, which won him a reputation as a thaumaturge. In 920, he took his place at a synod in Constantinople called by Nicholas Mysticus concerning the emperor Constantine Porphyrogenitus. He was a noted scholar and his work appears in the Patrologia Graeca.

He died at Argos and was buried in the Church of the Dormition there. His reputation for miracles continued, as his face appeared to be Transfiguration during his funeral, and his body was held to have exuded the "Oil of Saints". Later, his remains were moved to Nafplio, and afterwards taken abroad by the occupying Venetians under the auspices of the Latin bishop, the Venetian Segundo Nani. In Saint Peter's honor, a cathedral was built in Argos, which was founded in 1859 by Bishop Gerasimos Pagonis and was inaugurated on April 18, 1865. After a lengthy search, his relics were located at a monastery near Rome; they were returned to Argos in 19 January 2008 and now reside in St. Peter's Church.
