= Babolen =

Christian saint in medieval France

Saint Babolen
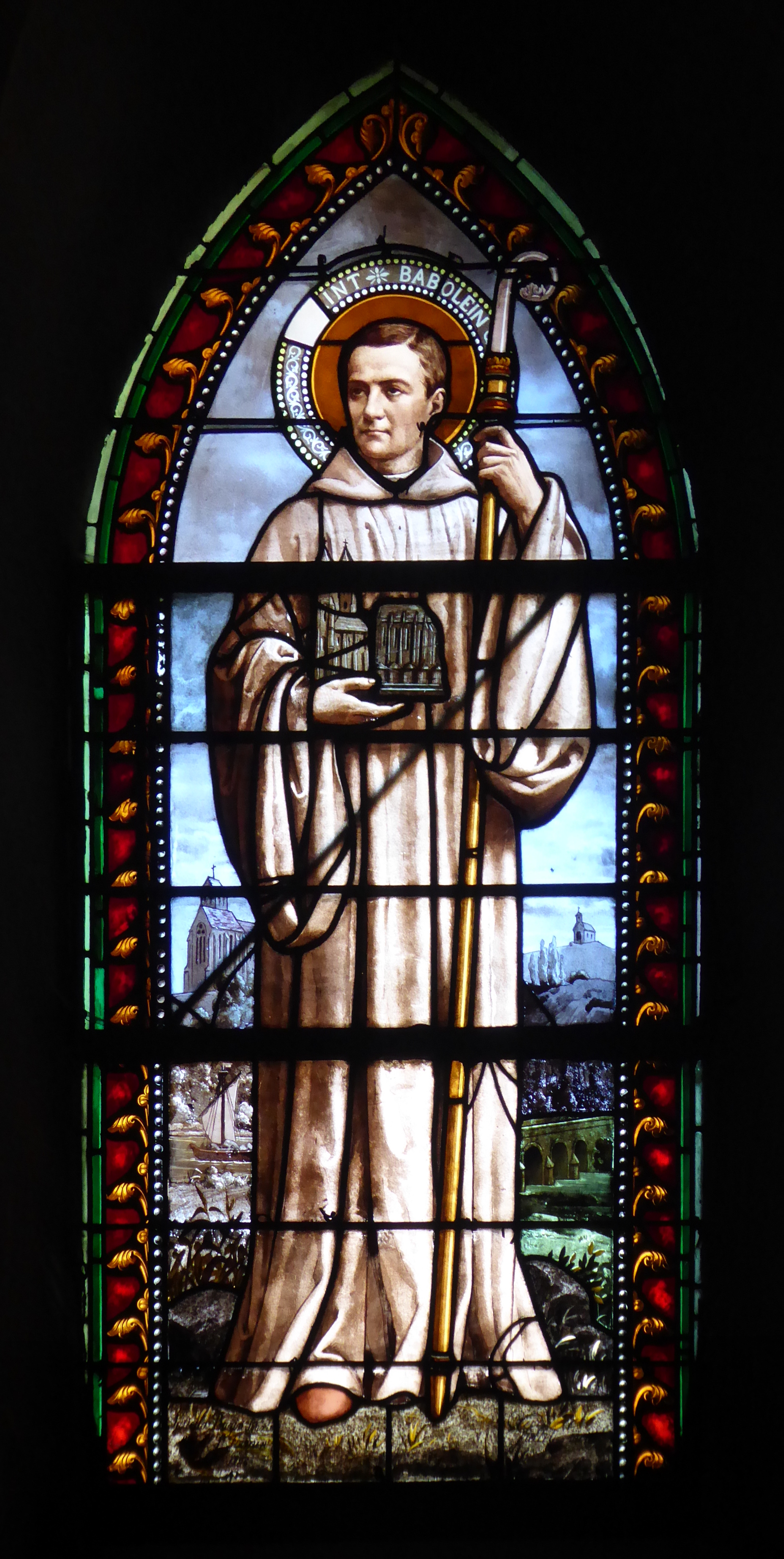
- Stained glass portrait of Saint Babolein in the Église Saint-Nicolas in Saint-Maur-des-Fossés
- Born: Scotland(?)
- Residence: Saint-Maur-des-Fossés Abbey near Paris
- Died: c. 671
- Feast: 26 June

Saint Babolen (or Babolenus, Babolin, Babolein; died c. 671) was Abbot of Saint-Maur-des-Fossés Abbey near Paris. He may have been Scottish in origin. His feast day is 26 June.

== Monks of Ramsgate account ==
The monks of St Augustine's Abbey, Ramsgate wrote in their Book of Saints (1921),

BABOLEN (St.) Abbot (June 26)
(7th century) A monk of unknown nationality but of the school of Saint Columbanus of Luxeuil, and allied with Saint Fursey. He laboured for the good of souls in the neighbourhood of Paris where he governed the monastery of Saint Maurdes-Fosses.

== Baring-Gould's account ==
Sabine Baring-Gould (1834–1924) in his Lives Of The Saints wrote under June 26,

S BABOLEN, AB.
(7th cent.)
[Roman, Gallican and Benedictine Martyrologies. Authority :—An account of his life and miracles in Mabillion]

S. BABOLEN, abbot of S. Maur-des-Fossés, was first monk of Luxeuil, then abbot of S. Pierre, and afterwards of S. Maur-des-Fossés. This monastery was founded in 638, by Blidegisl, archdeacon of Paris, and was situated in a peninsula formed by the Marne, about two leagues from Paris. There Babolen ruled over a large community. He joined S. Furey at Lagny, and rendered great services to the diocese of Paris, by founding in it many churches and hospitals, assisted by the zeal and liberality of bishop Andebert and S. Landri, his successor.

Having attained a very advanced age, he resigned his charge, and closed his days in a hermitage. He died in the seventh century, about the year 671.

== Butler's account ==
The hagiographer Alban Butler (1710–1773) wrote in his Lives of the Fathers, Martyrs, and Other Principal Saints under June 26,

St. Babolen, a monk of the Order of St. Columban, whose country is not known, coming into France was appointed first abbot of St. Peter’s des-Fosses, called St. Maur’s after the relics of that holy abbot were brought thither from Anjou. This monastery was founded by Blidegisil, archdeacon of Paris, in 638, in a peninsula formed by the river Marne, two leagues from Paris. St. Babolen rendered it a house of saints, and by the perfect spirit of charity, piety, and all virtues which reigned in it, a true image of paradise on earth. In conjunction with St. Fursey at Lagny he laboured much in serving the whole diocess of Paris by the authority of Bishop Audebert and his successor St. Landri. He founded many churches and hospitals in that diocess, and in his old age having resigned his abbacy to Ambrose, his successor, died in holy retirement in the seventh century. The new Paris Breviary honours his memory with one lesson on the 26th of June. See Molanus in Auctario Usuardi, and in Indiculo Sanctor. Belgii; Du Chesne, t. 1, Hist. Francor.; Mabillon, sæc. 2. Bened.

== O'Hanlon's account ==
John O'Hanlon (1821–1905) wrote of Babolin in his Lives of the Irish Saints. He noted that the nationality of the saint is doubtful, although some consider he was a Scot or Irishman. St. Babolenus, Abbot of Fossey, in Gaul has been confused with St. Papolenus, Bishop and Abbot, first at Malmundarium and afterwards at Stabuletum in Belgium, and with another abbot called Babolenus at Bobbio. O'Hanlon wrote,

At first, St. Babolin of Fosse seems to have been a Columban monk, at Luxeuil, and then Abbot of St. Pierre. About the year 638, the monastery of St. Maur-des-Fossés had been founded by Blidegisl, Archdeacon of Paris, in a peninsula formed by the Marne, about two leagues from Paris. There Babolen is said to have ruled over a large community. He joined St. Fursey, at Lagny. St. Babolin rendered great services to the diocese of Paris, by founding in it many churches and hospitals. About the year 640, St. Babolen is said to have began his rule over Fosse, where he laboured with great diligence and zeal. There, too, he built a church, in honour of the Blessed Mother of God. St. Babolin, having attained a very advanced age, resigned his charge to Ambrose his successor. Afterwards he retired to a hermitage. About the year 671 he departed this life, on the vi. day of the July Kalends—June 26th.

His body was buried in a stone sarcophagus, on the northern side of the church he had built and dedicated to the Blessed Virgin. There for many years it lay, while frequent miracles were wrought at his tomb. At length, his remains were translated to another church, which had been built by the religious Abbot Benedict, on the vii. of the December Ides; but, in what year has not been recorded. Various miracles have been ascribed to his merits, and in many places churches and altars were erected in his honour. The body of St. Babolein is preserved in a shrine, over the high altar at Fosse. In the Paris Breviary, his memory has been honoured with a proper Lesson on the 26th of June.

== Relics ==
The Chapel of Our Lady of Miracles, located next to the portico of the Church of St. Maur, was deconsecrated in 1750 and the relics of Saints Maur and Babolen were brought to the archdiocese of Paris to be distributed. The canons of St. Maur received the reliquary of St. Babolen and other items. The parish church of St. Maur received a vertebra and a small rib of St. Babolen. A bone from one of St. Babolen's arms went to the Chapel of St. Bond in the parish of St. Merry. The parishes of Joui-le-Moutier and Bois-d'Arcy in Paris received three other small bones of St. Babolen. The archbishop retained only the left tibia of St. Babolen.

== Sources ==
- Baring-Gould, Sabine (1897), The Lives Of The Saints, vol. 6, June, London: J. C. Nimmo This article incorporates text from this source, which is in the public domain.
- Butler, Alban (1799), The Lives of the Primitive Fathers, Martyrs, and Other Principal Saints: Compiled from Original Monuments and Other Authentic Records, vol. 6, J. Moir This article incorporates text from this source, which is in the public domain.
- O'Hanlon, John (1875), Lives of the Irish Saints : with special festivals, and the commemorations of holy persons, Dublin: J. Duffy This article incorporates text from this source, which is in the public domain.
- Magny; Hurtaut (1779), Dictionnaire historique de la ville de Paris et de ses environs (in French), vol. 3, Montard
- St. Augustine's Abbey, Ramsgate (1921), The Book of saints : a dictionary of servants of God canonized by the Catholic Church, London: A. & C. Black, ltd. This article incorporates text from this source, which is in the public domain.
