= Nilus the Myrrh-streamer =

17th-century Greek Orthodox Christian saint and ascetic

Saint Nilus the Myrrh-streamer
- Born: Nikolaos Terzakis (Νικόλαος Τερζάκης); Agios Petros, Arcadia, Greece
- Residence: Mount Athos, Greece
- Died: Mount Athos, Greece
- Venerated in: Eastern Orthodox Church
- Major shrine: Agios Nilos, Mount Athos
- Feast: November 12
- Tradition or genre: Hesychasm

Saint Nilus the Myrrh-streamer, also known as Nilos/Nilus the Myrrh-gusher, Nilus of Kynouria, or Nilus the Myroblyte (Greek: Άγιος Νείλος ο Μυροβλήτης; born c. 1601, died 1651), was an Orthodox Christian ascetic who lived at Mount Athos. He was a monk at the Monastery of Great Lavra who spent much of his life as a hermit at the southern tip of the Athos Peninsula.

His feast day is commemorated on November 12 according to the Julian calendar.

== Biography ==
He was born Nikolaos Terzakis (Greek: Νικόλαος Τερζάκης) around 1601 in a village called Agios Petros of Kynouria in Morea (Peloponnese), Greece. His parents died when he was young. After their death, he was cared for by his uncle, Hieromonk Macarius (or Makarios).

As a young man, he took his monastic vows and was soon ordained, first as a hierodeacon, and then as a hieromonk at the Monastery of Malevi in Kynouria. Together with his uncle Macarius, they lived as ascetics on Mount Athos.

After the death of Macarius, Nilus settled in a cave on a steep cliff overlooking the sea, at the southern tip of the Athos Peninsula. He built a small hut (kalyvi) there and lived there for the remainder of his life. Today, this area of Mount Athos, located about halfway between Katounakia and the Skete of Podromos, is called Agios Nilos, named in honor of St. Nilus.

Just before the end of his life, he said was to have myrrh flowing from his body in such abundance that it flowed into the sea from the top of the mountain. That miraculous myrrh attracted people from everywhere and was used to treat physical and spiritual illnesses.

== Relics ==
His holy relics were discovered in 1815. They are kept at the Monastery of Great Lavra.

Today, the Holy Cave of Agios Nilos (Greek: Ιερό Σπήλαιο Αγίου Νείλου) can be visited by pilgrims to Mount Athos.

== Prophecy of St. Nilus ==
The Posthumous Predictions of St. Nilus the Myrrh-streamer was purportedly published in 1912 at Mount Athos.
