= October 30 (Eastern Orthodox liturgics) =

Day in the Eastern Orthodox liturgical calendar

Eastern Orthodox liturgical calendar
October 29	October 30	October 31
October 30 O.S. ≍ November 12 N.S. October 30 N.S ≍ October 17 O.S.

An Eastern Orthodox cross

October 30 in Eastern Orthodox liturgical calendars is a feast day and a day of commemoration of saints and martyrs. Although some Orthodox churches use the Revised Julian Calendar and others use the traditional Julian calendar, the fixed commemorations for their respective October 30 are broadly the same, no matter which calendar is used. (Note: Despite the dates being the same, the days to which they refer typically differ by 13 days. The notation Old Style or O.S. is sometimes used to indicate a date in the traditional Julian Calendar (the "Old Calendar"). The notation New Style or N.S. indicates a date in the Revised Julian calendar (the "New Calendar").)

== Saints ==
- Apostle Cleopas of the Seventy, brother of Righteous Joseph the Betrothed (1st century) (Note: Name days celebrated today include: Cleopas (Κλεόπας).)
- Apostles Tertius (Terence), Mark, Justus, and Artemas, of the Seventy Disciples (1st century)
- Hieromartyr Marcian, Bishop of Syracuse (2nd century) (see also: February 9)
- Virgin-martyr Apollonia of Alexandria the deaconess (parthénos presbytis), and those with her in Alexandria (249) (Note: In the Greek Orthodox Church she is commemorated on October 30th in accordance with the resolution of the Church of Greece in the year 2000. in the West she is commemorated on February 9.) (see also: February 9)
- Martyrs Alexander, Cronion, Julian, Macarius, and 13 companions, at Alexandria (250) (Note: According to the Great Synaxaristes in Greek, these were: "Coïntas (Quintus), Mitras, Nemesion, Ptolemy, Theophilos, Igenis, Isidoros, Claudius, Epimachus, Eutropios, Zenon, Heron, Ammon, Atir, Besas, Dioskouros, Alexander, Cronion, Julian, Macarius and 13 other martyrs."; Coïntas (Quintus) and Mitras were tortured and then killed by having boiled lime poured over them; Nemesios and Ptolemy were cruelly tortured and ultimately beheaded; and of the remaining witnesses, some were burned alive and others were beheaded.) (Note: "At Alexandria, in the reign of Decius, thirteen holy martyrs, who suffered with Saints Julian, Eunus and Macarius.")
- Martyr Eutropia of Alexandria (250) (Note: "In the same place, St. Eutropia, martyr, who visited the martyrs, and was so cruelly tortured with them that she breathed her last.")
- Hieromartyr Zenobius, Bishop of Aegae in Cilicia, and his sister Zenobia (285) (Note: "At Ægea, in Cilicia, the martyrdom of the Saints Zenobius, bishop, and Zenobia, his sister, under the emperor Diocletian and the governor Lysias.") (Note: Name days celebrated today include: Zenobius (Ζηνόβιος); Zenobia (Ζηνοβία).)
- Martyrs Claudius, Asterius, Neon and Neonilla, siblings, of Laranda in Cilicia, by beheading (c. 288) (see also: October 29)
- Martyr Manuel (Emmanuel). (Note: Possibly the same individual as is commemorated March 26 - Saint Emmanuel.)
- Martyr Dometios of Phrygia, by the sword. (see also: March 23)
- Martyr Demios, the former executioner. (see also: March 25)
- Holy Nine Martyrs. (Note: Possibly the same as those commemorated on March 12 and on May 16.)
- Saint Asterius, Metropolitan of Amasea (before 431)
- Venerable Therapon, Ascetic and Wonderworker of Lythrodontas, Cyprus (c. 7th century)

== Pre-Schism Western saints ==
- Saint Marcellus of Tangier, a Roman centurion in Tangier in North Africa (298) (Note: During a festival in honour of the Emperor, he refused to join in the pagan celebrations and declared himself to be Orthodox. The notary who refused to write the official report was also martyred with him, St Cassian.) (Note: "At Tangier, in Morocco, St. Marcellus, a centurion, who endured martyrdom by being beheaded under the vice-prefect Agricolaus.")
- Saints Claudius, Lupercus and Victorius, three brothers, sons of the centurion St Marcellus of Tangier, martyred in Léon in Spain under Diocletian (c. 300) (Note: "At Leon, in Spain, the holy martyrs Claudius, Lupercus, and Victorius, sons of the centurion St. Marcellus, who were condemned to decapitation, in the persecution of Diocletian and Maximian, under the governor Diogenian.")
- Saint Saturninus of Cagliari, a martyr in Cagliari in Sardinia under Diocletian, beheaded during a pagan festival of Jupiter (303) (Note: "At Cagliari, in Sardinia, St. Saturninus, martyr, who was beheaded under the governor Barbarus, during the persecution of Diocletian.")
- Saint Theonestus, by tradition Bishop of Philippi, later martyred in Altino in Italy (425) (Note: By tradition Bishop of Philippi in Macedonia, driven out by the Arians. He was sent with companions (among whom was St Alban of Mainz) to enlighten Germany. However, in Mainz they were obliged to flee from invading Vandals and on their way Theonestus was martyred in Altino in Italy.) (Note: "At Altino, St. Theonestus, bishop and martyr, who was killed by the Arians.")
- Martyrs of North-West Africa. (Note: A group of Christians, numbering between one and two hundred, massacred in one of the early persecutions.)
- Saint Arilda of Oldbury, virgin-martyr in Gloucestershire, England (c. 5th century)
- Saint Eutropia, a holy woman who lived in Auvergne in France (5th century)
- Saint Lucanus, a martyr in Lagny in France, where his relics were enshrined (5th century)
- Saint Germanus of Capua, Bishop of Capua and a friend of St Benedict (c. 545)
- Saint Talarican, probably Pictish, St Talarican was a bishop in Scotland and several churches were dedicated to him (8th century)
- Saint Herbert (Haberne, Herbern), Abbot of Marmoutier and later Archbishop of Tours in France (916)
- Saint Ethelnoth, called 'the Good' and famed for his wisdom, was a monk at Glastonbury, became thirty-second Archbishop of Canterbury (1038)
- Saint Nanterius (Nantier, Nantère), Abbot of Saint Mihiel Abbey in Lorraine in France (1044)

== Post-Schism Orthodox saints ==
- Saint Joseph I Galesiotes, Patriarch of Constantinople (1283)
- Saint Stephen Milutin, King of Serbia (1320), his brother St. Dragutin (monk Theoctistus) (1316), and their mother St. Helen (1306)
- Martyr Iotam Zedgenidze, near Lake Paravani, Georgia (1465)

=== New martyrs and confessors ===
- New Hieromartyr Nicanor (Kudriavtsev) bishop of Bogoroditsk (1923)
- New Hieromartyr Eugene (Zernov), Metropolitan of Gorkovsky (Nizhni Novgorod) (1935)
- New Hieromartyr Leonid Vinogradov, Priest (1941)
- New Hieromartyr Matthew Kazarin, Protodeacon of Alma Ata (1942)
- New Hiero-confessor Varnava Nastić of Bosnia, Bishop of Hvosno (1964)

== Other commemorations ==
- Finding of the relics of Great-martyr Stephen-Urosh III of Decani, Serbia (1338)
- Icon of the Mother of God of Ozeryanka (16th century)
- Uncovering of the relics of St. Agafangel (Preobrazhensky), Metropolitan of Yaroslavl, Confessor of the Faith (1998)
- Uncovering of the relics (2009) of St. Eutropia (Isayenkova) of Kherson (1968)
- Repose of Archimandrite Boris (Kholchev) of Tashkent (1971)

== Icon gallery ==
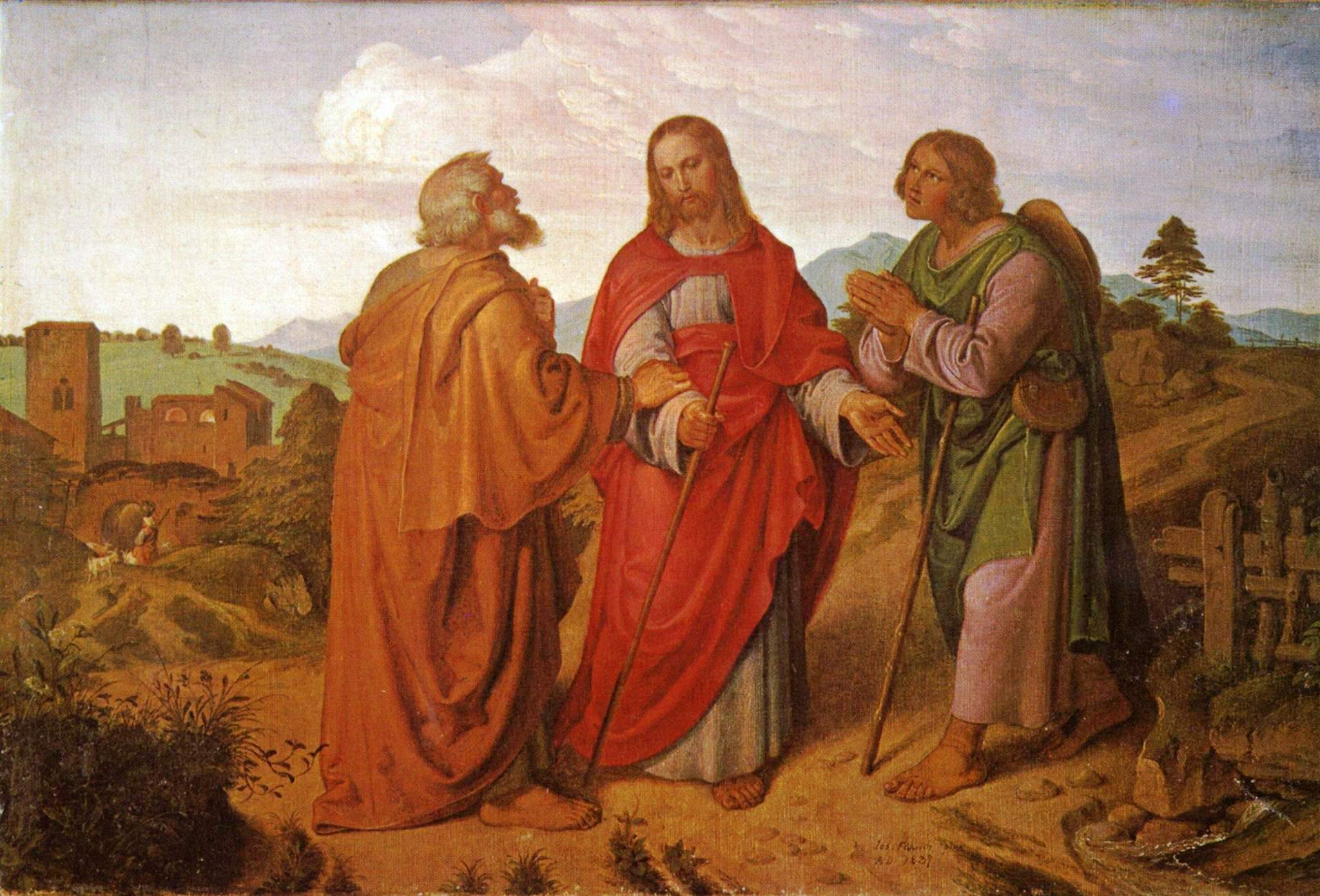
Apostle Cleopas of the Seventy.

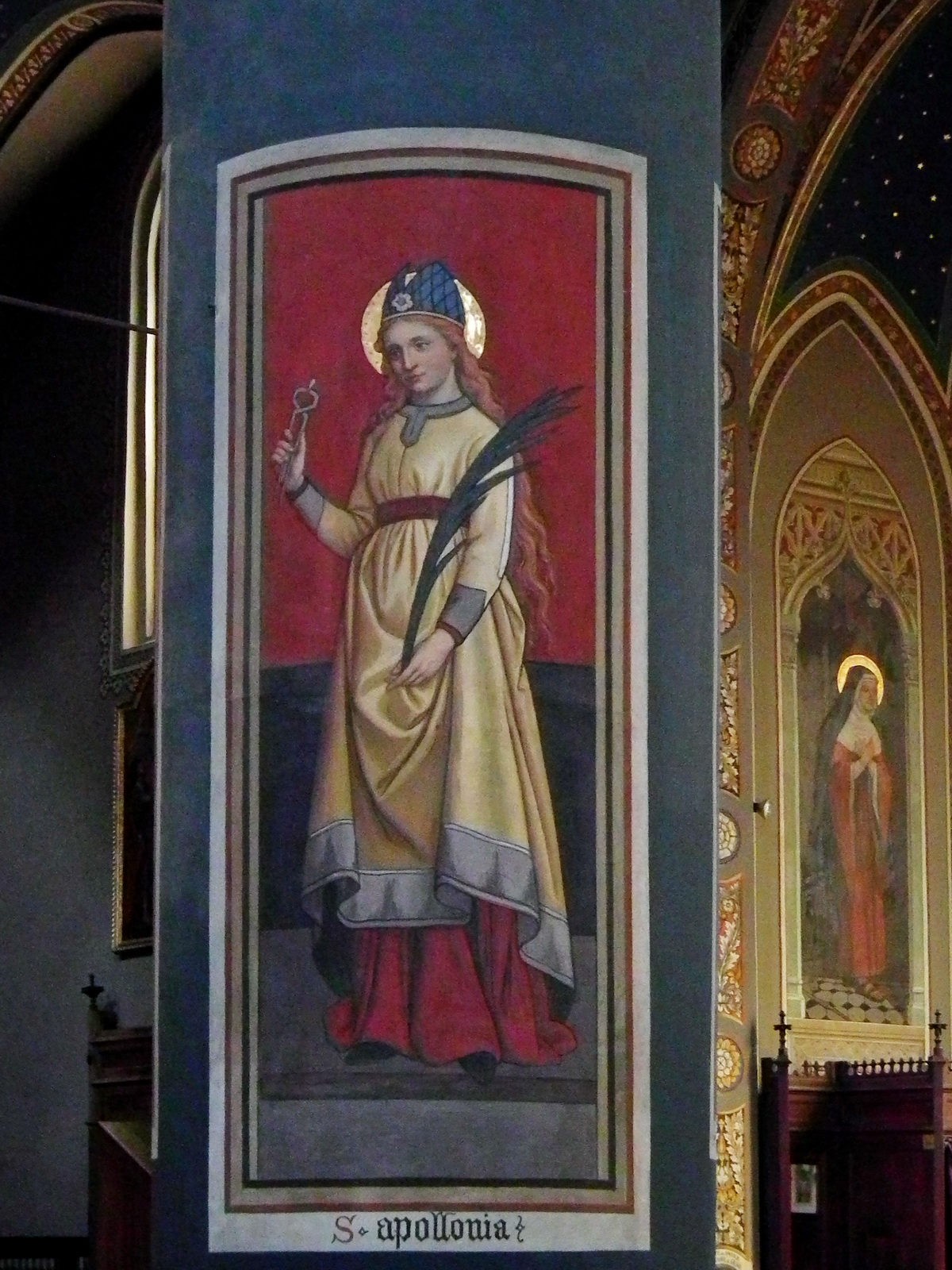
Virgin-martyr Apollonia of Alexandria.

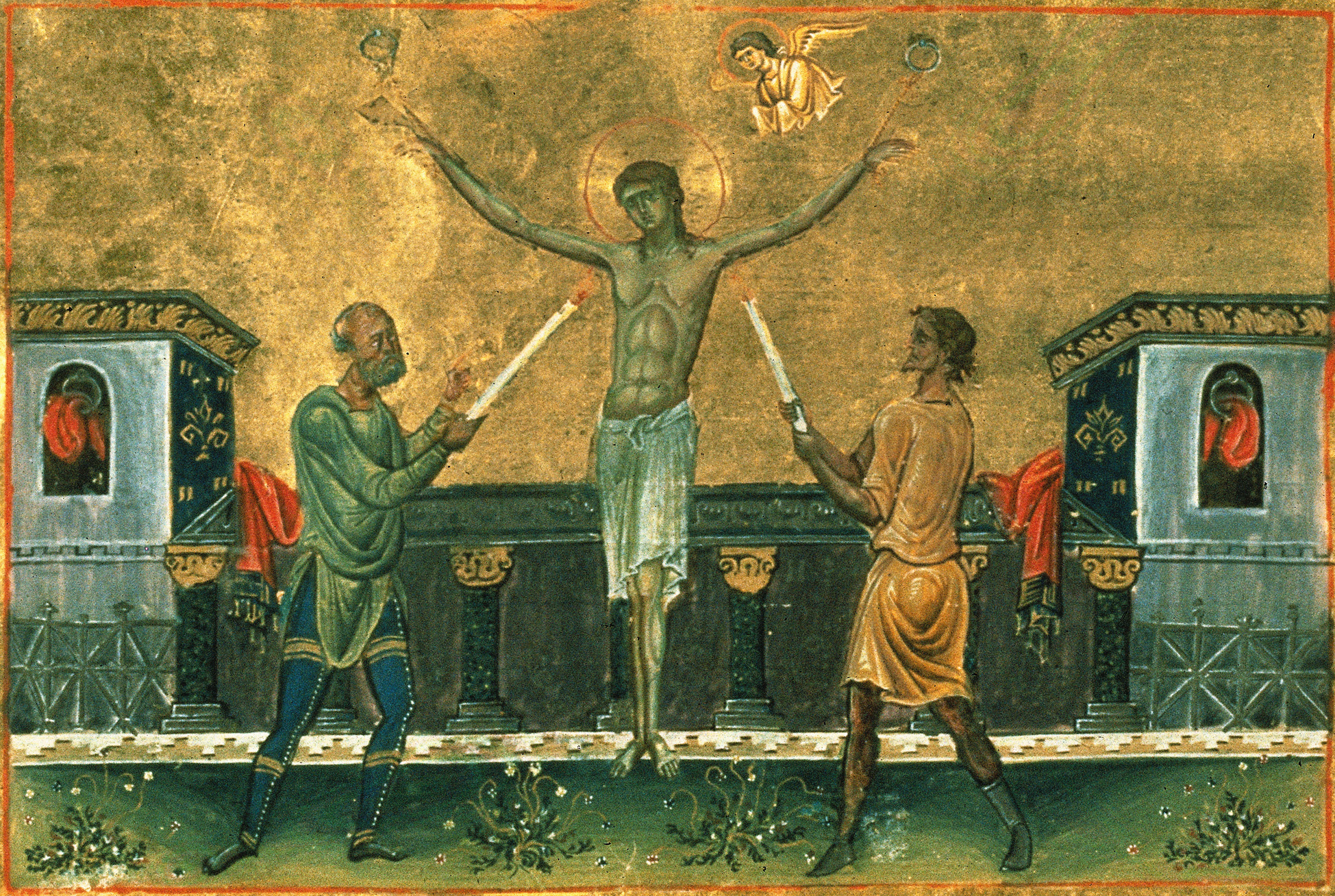
Martyr Eutropia of Alexandria.
(Menologion of Basil II, 10th century).

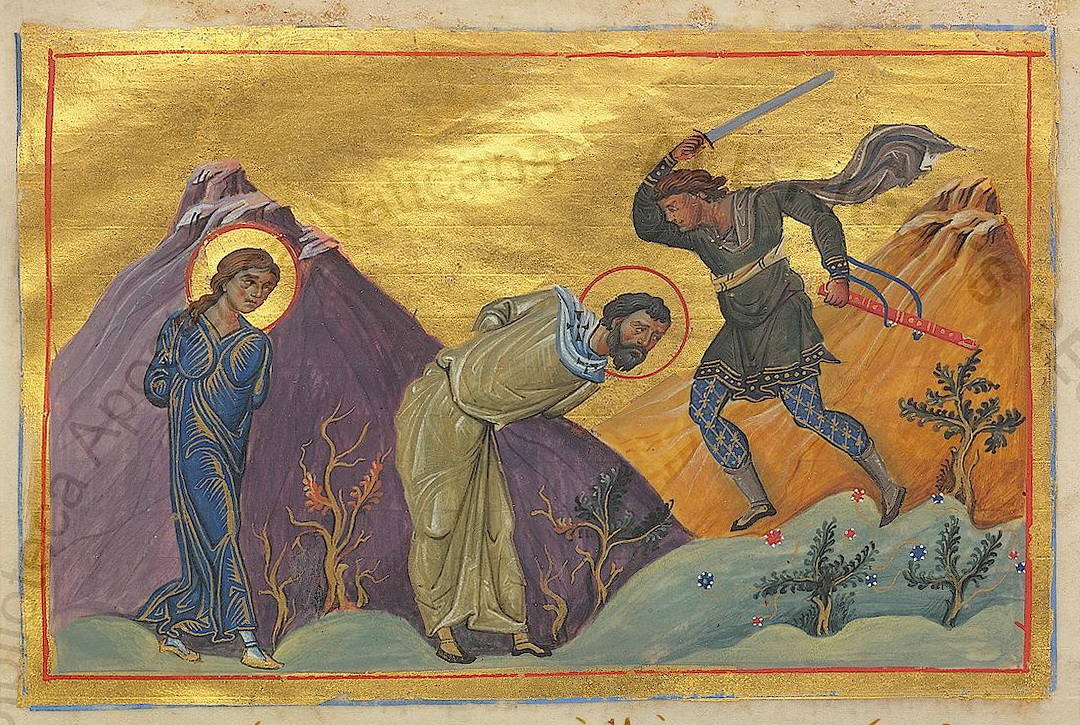
Hieromartyr Zenobius, Bishop of Aegae in Cilicia, and his sister Zenobia.
(Menologion of Basil II, 10th century).

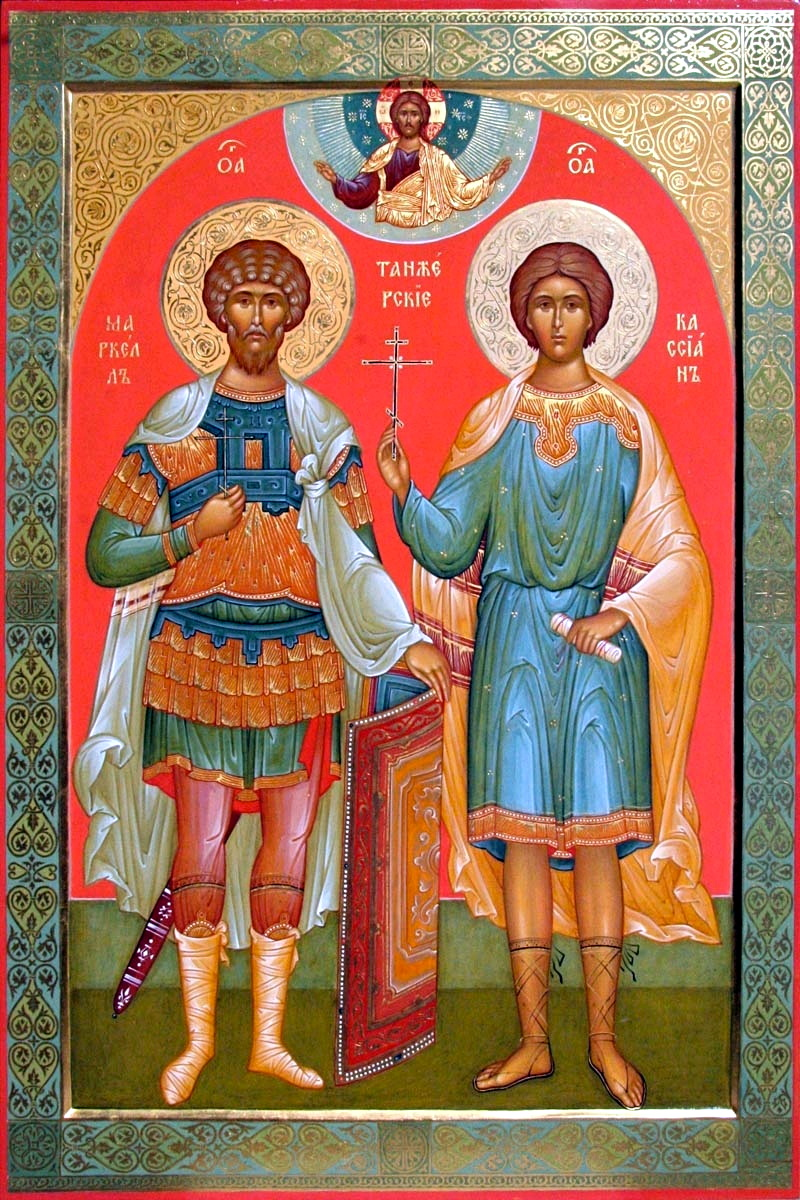
St Marcellus of Tangier and Cassian of Tangier.

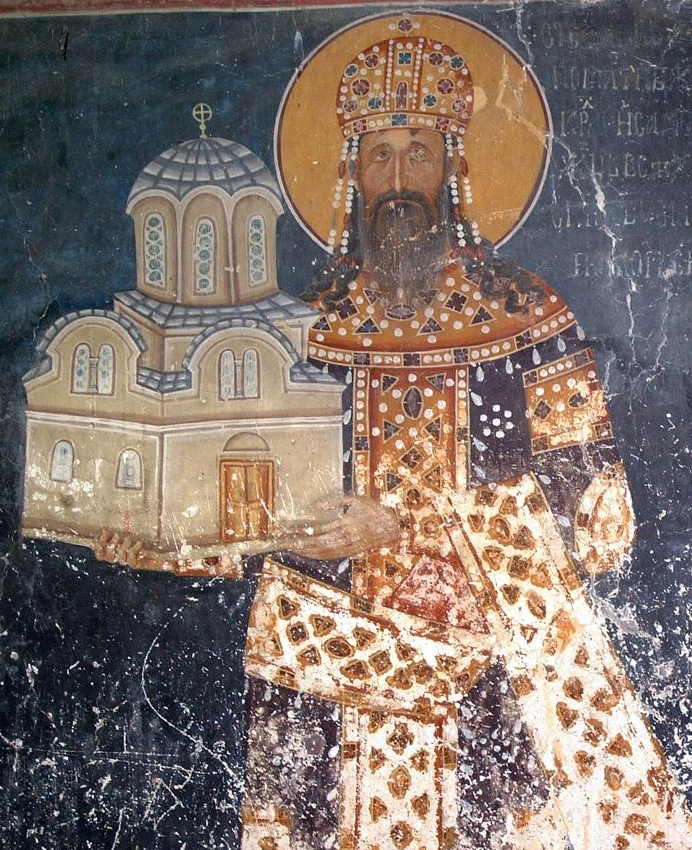
St. Stephen Milutin, King of Serbia.

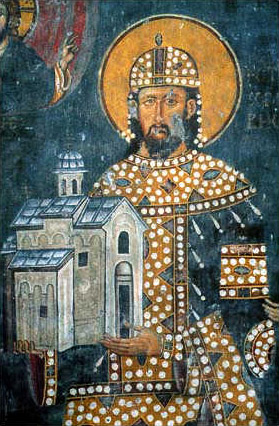
St. Stephen Dragutin of Serbia (monk Theoctistus).

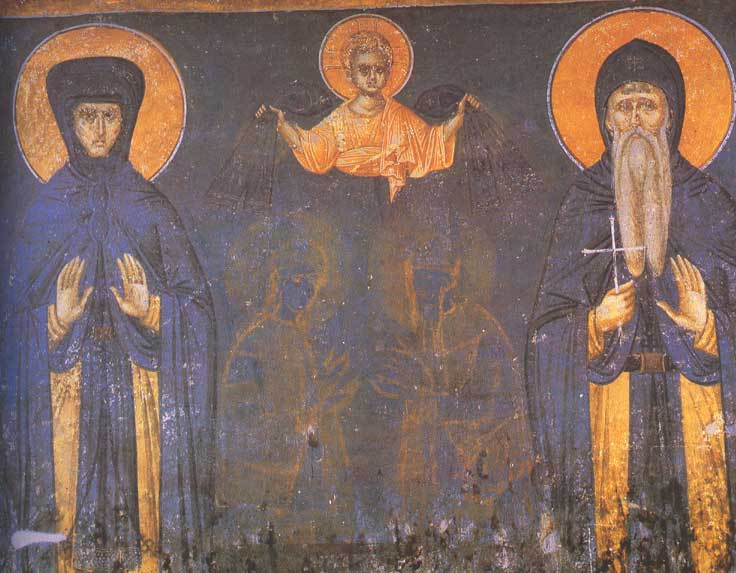
St. Helen and her son, King Stephen Milutin.

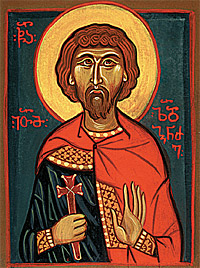
Martyr Iotam Zedgenidze, near Lake Paravani, Georgia.

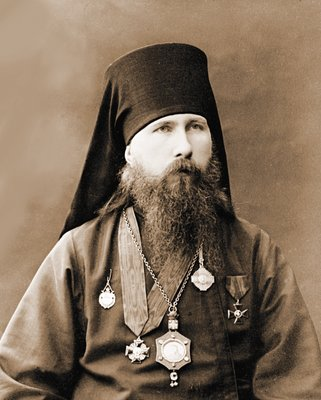
New Hieromartyr Eugene (Zernov), Metropolitan of Gorkovsky (Nizhni Novgorod).

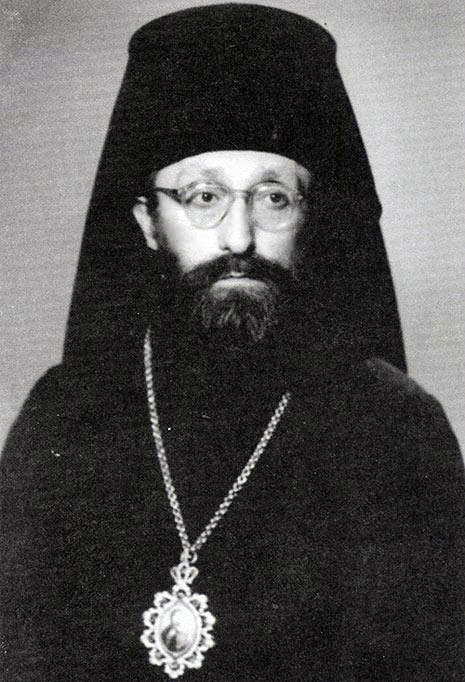
New Hiero-confessor Varnava Nastić of Bosnia, Bishop of Hvosno.

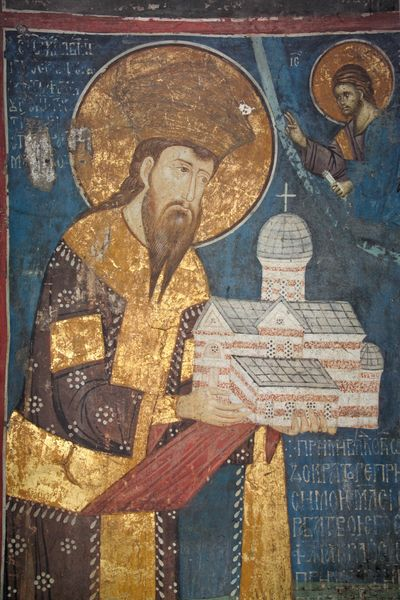
Great-martyr Stephen-Urosh III of Decani, Serbia.

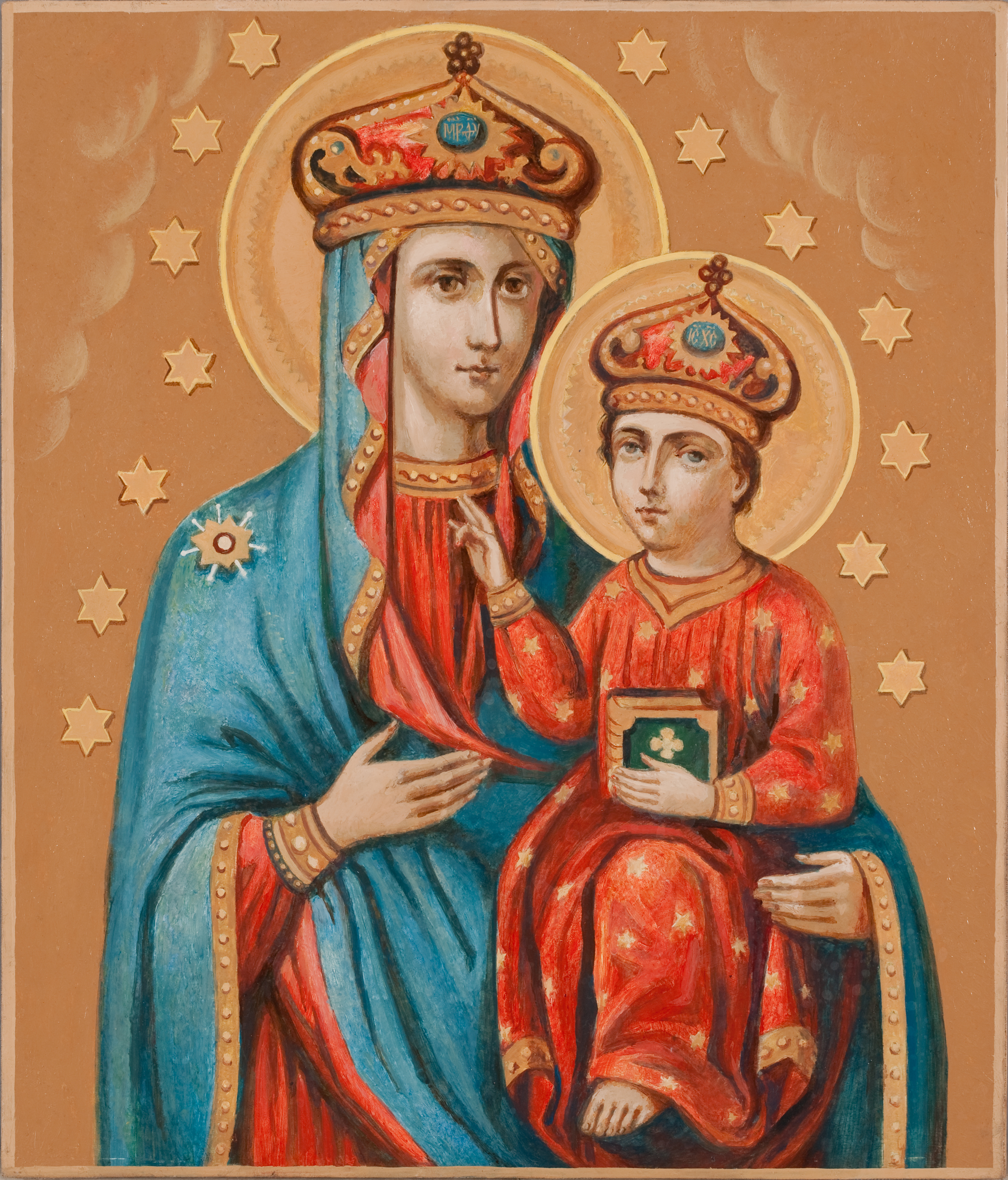
Icon of the Mother of God of Ozeryanka.

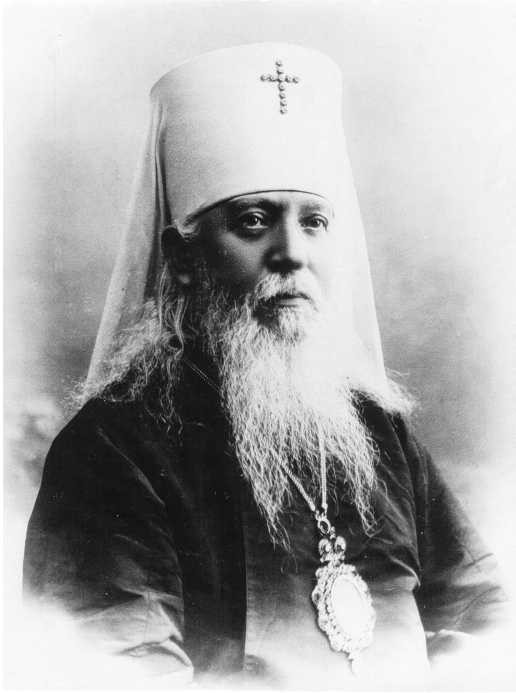
St. Agafangel (Preobrazhensky), Metropolitan of Yaroslavl.

== Sources ==
- October 30/November 12. Orthodox Calendar (PRAVOSLAVIE.RU).
- November 12 / October 30. HOLY TRINITY RUSSIAN ORTHODOX CHURCH (A parish of the Patriarchate of Moscow).
- October 30. OCA - The Lives of the Saints.
- The Autonomous Orthodox Metropolia of Western Europe and the Americas (ROCOR). St. Hilarion Calendar of Saints for the year of our Lord 2004. St. Hilarion Press (Austin, TX). p. 81.
- The Thirtieth Day of the Month of October. Orthodoxy in China.
- October 30. Latin Saints of the Orthodox Patriarchate of Rome.
- The Roman Martyrology. Transl. by the Archbishop of Baltimore. Last Edition, According to the Copy Printed at Rome in 1914. Revised Edition, with the Imprimatur of His Eminence Cardinal Gibbons. Baltimore: John Murphy Company, 1916. p. 333-334.
- Rev. Richard Stanton. A Menology of England and Wales, or, Brief Memorials of the Ancient British and English Saints Arranged According to the Calendar, Together with the Martyrs of the 16th and 17th Centuries. London: Burns & Oates, 1892. pp. 518–519.

Greek Sources

- Great Synaxaristes: (in Greek) 30 ΟΚΤΩΒΡΙΟΥ. ΜΕΓΑΣ ΣΥΝΑΞΑΡΙΣΤΗΣ.
- (in Greek) Συναξαριστής. 30 Οκτωβρίου. ECCLESIA.GR. (H ΕΚΚΛΗΣΙΑ ΤΗΣ ΕΛΛΑΔΟΣ).
- (in Greek) 30/10/2015. Ορθόδοξος Συναξαριστής.

Russian Sources

- (in Russian) 12 ноября (30 октября). Православная Энциклопедия под редакцией Патриарха Московского и всея Руси Кирилла (электронная версия). (Orthodox Encyclopedia - Pravenc.ru).
- (in Russian) 30 октября по старому стилю / 12 ноября по новому стилю. Русская Православная Церковь - Православный церковный календарь на 2015 год.
