= October 29 (Eastern Orthodox liturgics) =

Day in the Eastern Orthodox liturgical calendar

Eastern Orthodox liturgical calendar
October 28	October 29	October 30
October 29 O.S. ≍ November 11 N.S. October 29 N.S ≍ October 16 O.S.

An Eastern Orthodox cross

October 29 in Eastern Orthodox liturgical calendars is a feast day and a day of commemoration of saints and martyrs. Although some Orthodox churches use the Revised Julian Calendar and others use the traditional Julian calendar, the fixed commemorations for their respective October 29 are broadly the same, no matter which calendar is used. (Note: Despite the dates being the same, the days to which they refer typically differ by 13 days. The notation Old Style or O.S. is sometimes used to indicate a date in the traditional Julian Calendar (the "Old Calendar"). The notation New Style or N.S. indicates a date in the Revised Julian calendar (the "New Calendar").)

== Saints ==
- Virgin Martyr Anastasia the Roman (258) (Note: Martyrs Anastasia and Cyril, early martyrs in Rome (c. 253). The former was bound with chains in Valerian's persecution under the Prefect Probus, tortured, her breasts cut off, her nails torn out, her teeth broken, her hands and feet cut off, and being beheaded, she passed to her Bridegroom; Cyril, who offered her water when she begged for it, received martydom as his reward.) (see also: October 12; and October 28 - West)
- Martyrs Claudius, Asterius, Neon, and Theonilla, of Aegae in Cilicia (285) (see also: October 30)
- Martyr Sabbas Stratelates. (see also: April 24)
- Martyrs Cyril, Menas, and Menaeus, by the sword. (Note: Martyrs Menas and Menaeus are also commemorated on August 1.)
- Venerable Abramius the Recluse (360) and his niece St. Mary of Mesopotamia (397)
- Martyr Melitene of Marcionopolis, by beheading.
- Venerable Anna of Mt. Olympus in Bithynia, known as "Euphemianus" (826)
- Saint Serapion of Zarzma monastery, Georgia (900)
- Martyr Vassa (Bassa). (Note: Her memory is preserved in the synaxarion of Sirmond as follows: (in Greek) «Τῇ αὕτῃ ἡμέρα μνήμη τῶν Ἁγίων Ἀποστόλων καὶ Μαρτύρων Πέτρου, Παύλου, Ἰωάννου τοῦ Προδρόμου καὶ Βαπτιστοῦ, Στεφάνου τοῦ Πρωτομάρτυρος, Βαρνάβα τοῦ Ἀποστόλου, Ἰωσὴφ τοῦ Πατριάρχου, καὶ Κλεώπα, Τροφίμου, Δορυμέδοντος, Κοσμᾶ, Δαμιανοῦ, Βάσσης καὶ τῆς συνοδείας αὐτῶν. Τελεῖται δὲ ἡ αὐτῶν σύναξις ἐν τῷ σεπτῷ ἀποστολείῳ τοῦ Ἁγίου καὶ Πανευφήμου Ἀποστόλου Παύλου ἐν τῷ Ὀρφανοτροφείῳ ἅμα δὲ καὶ τὰ ἐγκαίνια τοῦ αὐτοῦ ναοῦ».)
- Saint Diomedes of Lefkosia. (Note: His memory is preserved in Parisian Codex 1589 (p. 91a), where he is described as a student of our holy father Trifyllios, Bishop of Lefkosia.)

== Pre-Schism Western saints ==
- Saint Eusebia, a virgin-martyr in Bergamo in Italy and niece of St Domnio, martyred under Maximian Herculeus (late 3rd century)
- Martyrs Hyacinth, Quintus, Felician and Lucius, at Lucania in the south of Italy.
- Saint Kennera (Cinnera, Cannera), an anchoress in Kirk-Kinner in Galloway in Scotland (4th century) (Note: "[Scottish Martyrologies. Aberdeen Breviary.]": "S. Kennera is the same as Cineria, one of the virgins of Colosse, who, it is pretended, accompanied S. Regulus, and were buried in S. Andrew's. The Aberdeen Breviary, however, is guilty of a blunder, in that she is confounded with S. Cunera (June 12), whose translation took place on October 28; and adopts the legend of Cunera and takes the lessons from it. Her church was Kirk-kinner in Galway. She was probably some recluse.")
- Saint Terence of Metz, sixteenth Bishop of Metz in the east of France (520)
- Saint Theodore (Theudar), a priest and disciple of St Caesarius of Arles, also abbot of one of the monasteries of Vienne in France (c. 575) (Note: He founded several monasteries and reposed as a hermit in the church of St Laurence in Vienne.)
- Venerable Ermelinda (Ermelindis), Anchoress in Meldaert, Belgium (c. 595)
- Saint Colman of Kilmacduagh, a hermit in Arranmore and Burren in Co. Clare, founder of the monastery of Kilmacduagh (c. 632)
- Saint Bond (Baldus), born in Spain, he became a hermit in Sens in France (7th century) (Note: "[Gallican Martyrologies. Authority: — The Lessons in the Sens Breviary.]": "The story of S. Baldus, called in France S. Bond, is a lingering reminiscence among the Franks of a myth akin to the Tannhäuser of German tradition. The story goes that he was a Spaniard, who had murdered by mistake his father and mother. Weighed down with horror at his crime, and finding no rest, he rambled to Jerusalem, and to Rome, and finally to Sens, where he confessed to the bishop, S. Artemius, all his sin, and asked if any hope of pardon could be given him. "Only when this dry staff I hold in my hand shall bear leaves and flowers," answered the bishop. "Go plant it and water it daily." Baldus did as he was bidden; and lo! after a while the dry staff put forth buds and blossomed, and he knew that he was forgiven.")
- Saint Sigolinus (Sighelm), abbot of Stavelot and Malmédy in Belgium (c. 670)
- Saint John of Autun, a Bishop venerated in Autun, Confessor.
- Saint Stephen of Cajazzo, Abbot of San Salvatore Maggiore, and Bishop of Cajazzo (1023)

== Post-Schism Orthodox saints ==
- Venerable Abramius of Rostov, Archimandrite, Wonderworker (1073)
- Venerable Abramius, recluse of the Kiev Near Caves (14th century)
- New Martyr Athanasius of Sparta, at Mudanya (1653)
- Martyr Timothy of Esphigmenou Monastery, Mt. Athos, at Adrianople (1820)

=== New martyrs and confessors ===
- New Hieromartyrs Nicholas Probatov, priest (1918), and with him:

- Cosma, Victor Krasnov, Naum, Philip, John, Paul, Andrew, Paul, Basil, Alexis, John and Virgin-martyr Agatha (1918)

- New Hieromartyr John Rudinsky, priest (1930)
- New Hieromartyr Eugene Ivashko, priest (1937)
- New Martyr Anastasia Lebedev (after 1937)
- New Hieromartyr Leonid Muravev, Priest (1941)

== Other commemorations ==
- Commemoration of the deposition of the Honorable Head of the Holy Glorious Prophet, Forerunner and Baptist John. (Note: This commemoration (for October 29) is recorded only in the Lavreotic Codex IV, f. 15, where there is also a special Canon for this feast by an unknown poet, which among other things says: "A skull of thy wealth is faithfully embraced here in the city by the venerable Church. Forerunner, preacher of Christ.") (see also: August 29 - commonly celebrated feast day)
- Glorification (1994) of Equal-to-the-Apostles Rostislav, Prince of Greater Moravia, Czechoslovakia (870) (see also: May 11)

== Icon gallery ==
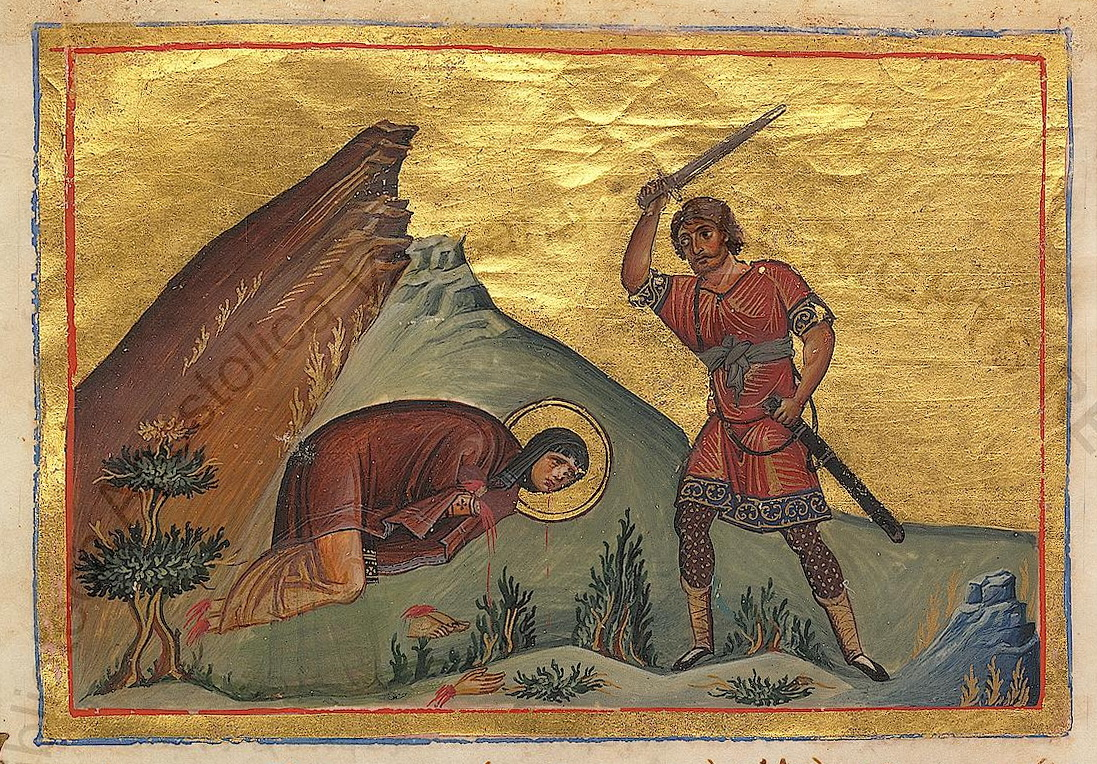
Virgin-martyr Anastasia of Rome.
(Menologion of Basil II, 10th century).

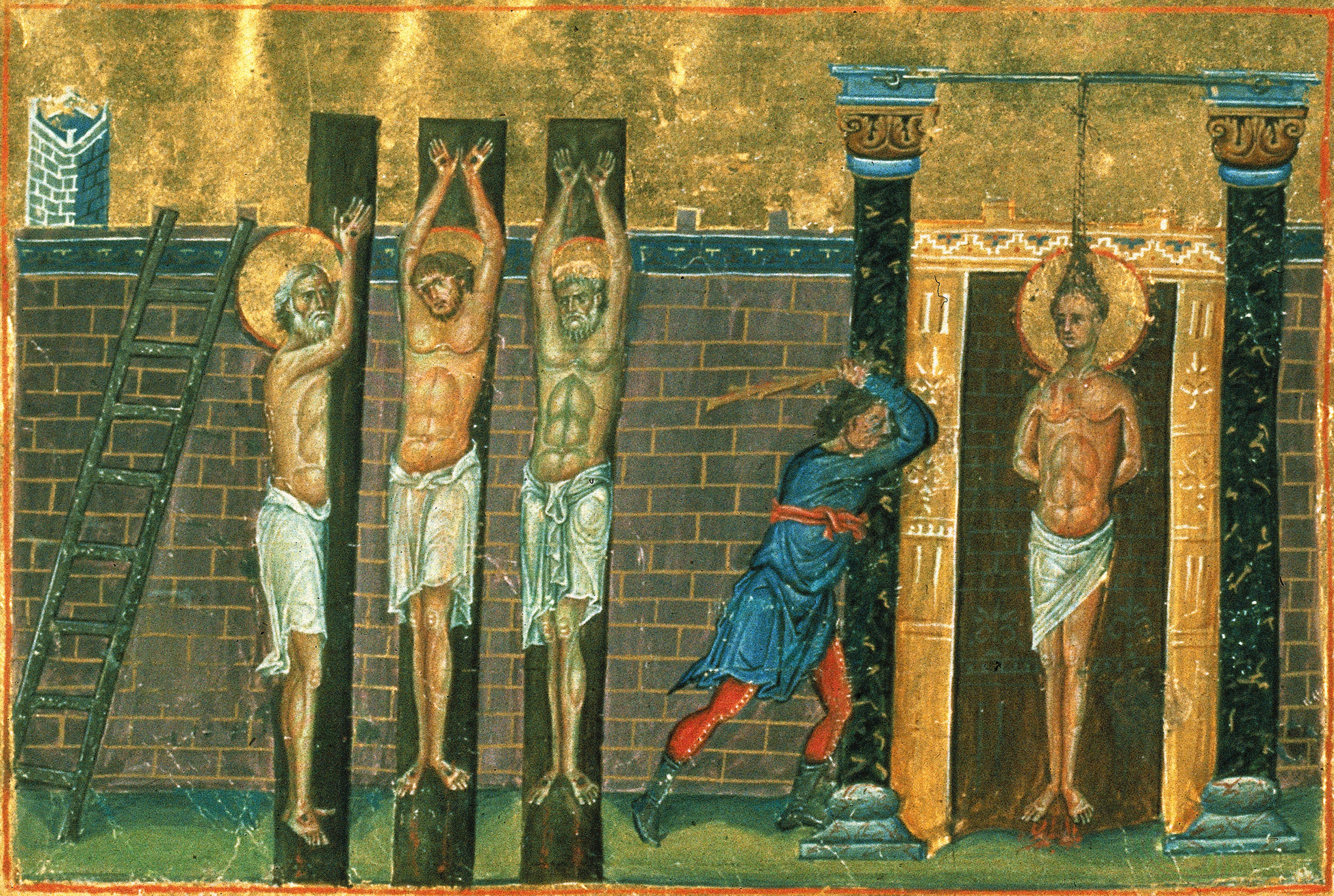
Martyrs Claudius, Asterius, Neon, and Theonilla, of Aegae in Cilicia.
(Menologion of Basil II, 10th century).

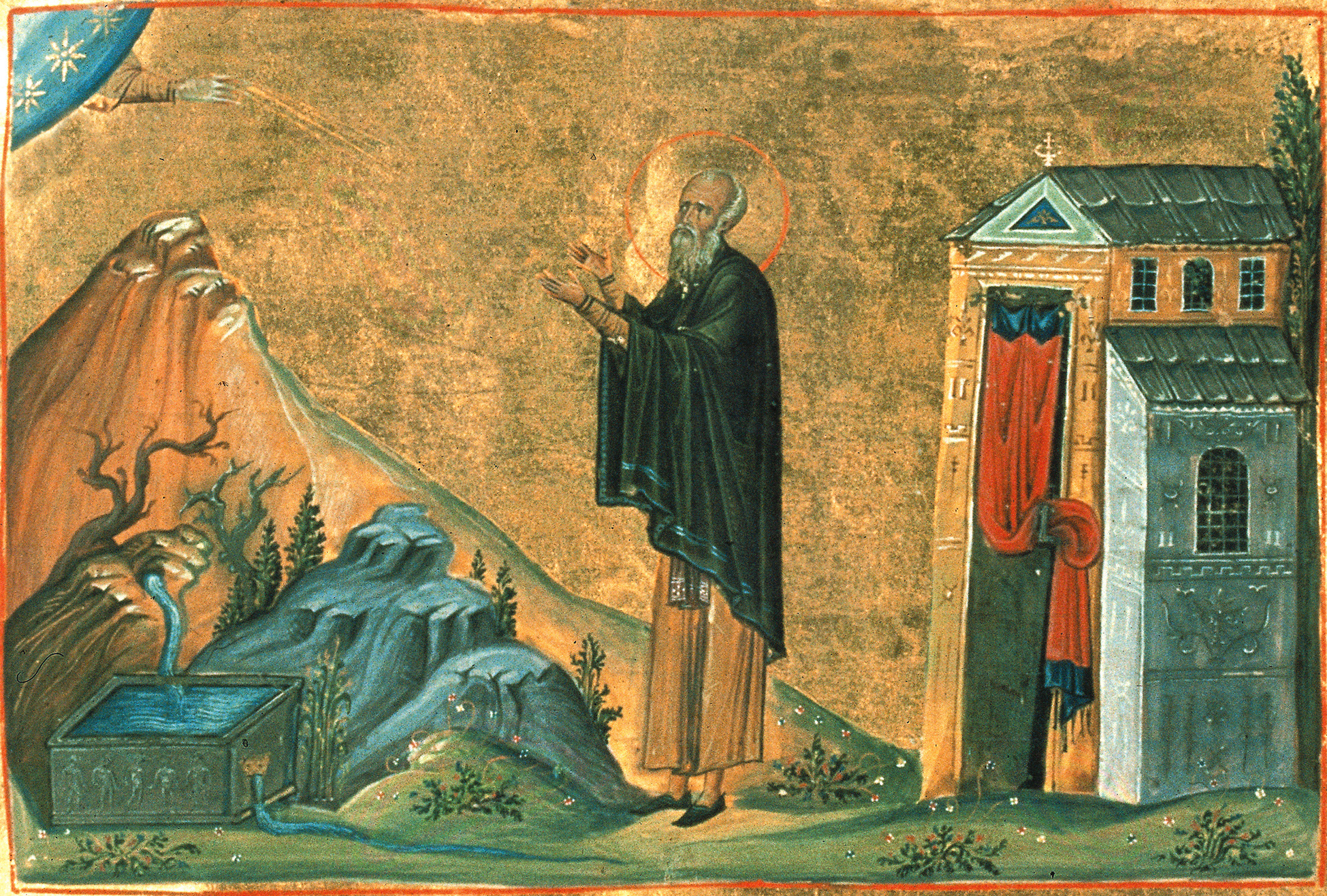
St. Abramios the Recluse
(Abraham of Kidunaja).
(Menologion of Basil II, 10th century).

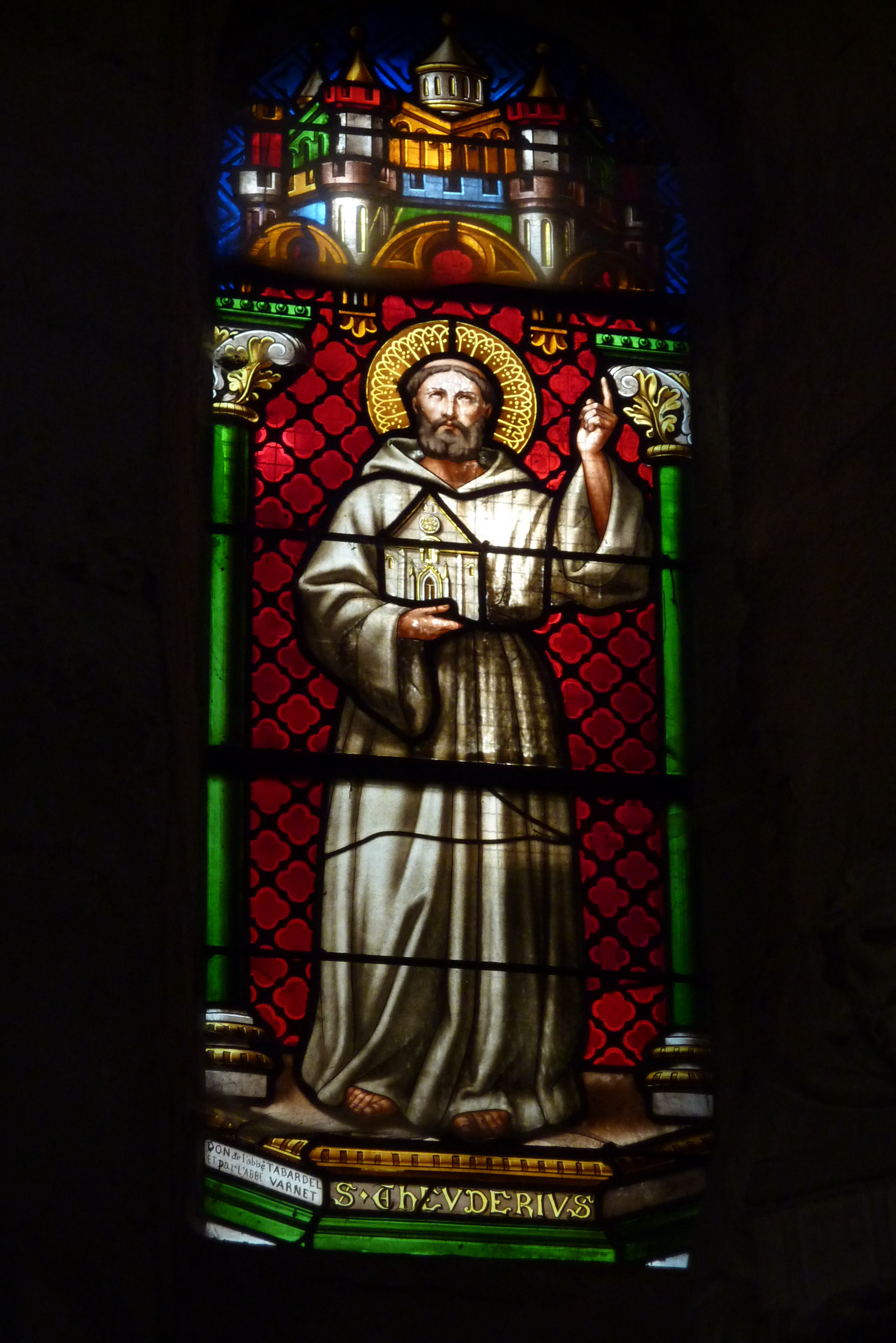
St. Theuderius of Vienne.

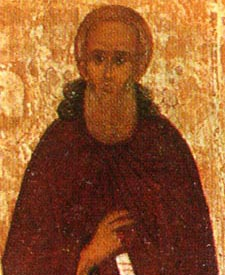
St. Abramius of Rostov.

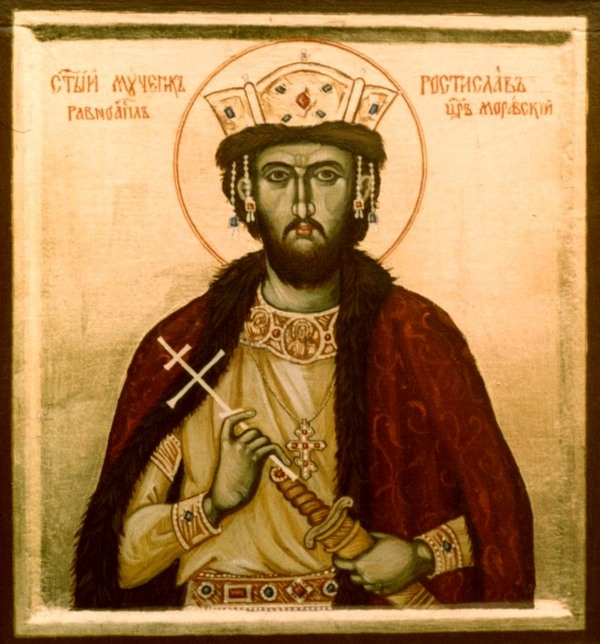
St. Rostislav, Prince of Moravia.

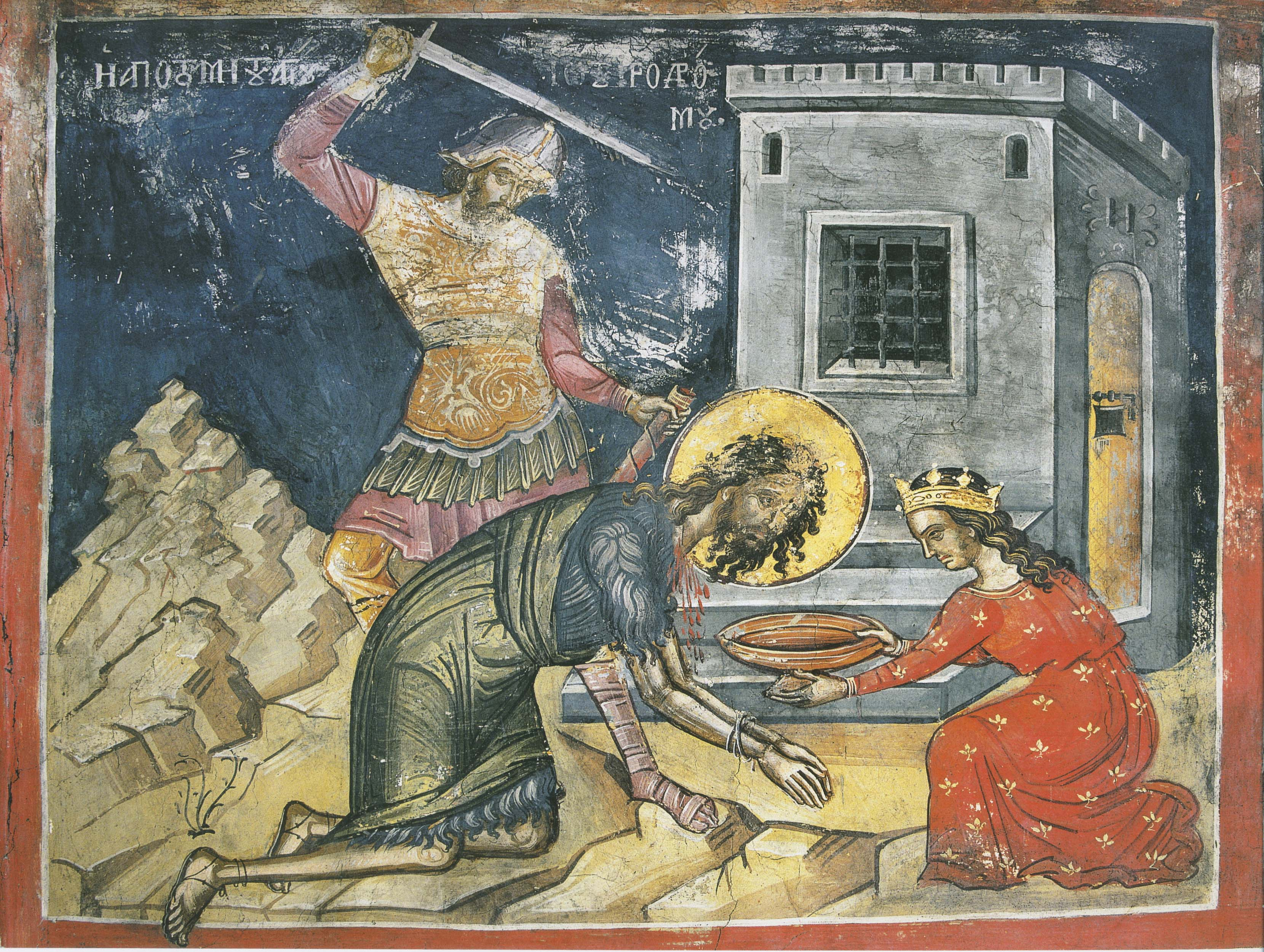
Beheading of the Glorious Prophet, Forerunner, and Baptist John.
(Dionysiou monastery).

== Sources ==
- October 29/November 11. Orthodox Calendar (PRAVOSLAVIE.RU).
- November 11 / October 29. HOLY TRINITY RUSSIAN ORTHODOX CHURCH (A parish of the Patriarchate of Moscow).
- October 29. OCA - The Lives of the Saints.
- The Autonomous Orthodox Metropolia of Western Europe and the Americas (ROCOR). St. Hilarion Calendar of Saints for the year of our Lord 2004. St. Hilarion Press (Austin, TX). p. 81.
- The Twenty-Ninth Day of the Month of October. Orthodoxy in China.
- October 29. Latin Saints of the Orthodox Patriarchate of Rome.
- The Roman Martyrology. Transl. by the Archbishop of Baltimore. Last Edition, According to the Copy Printed at Rome in 1914. Revised Edition, with the Imprimatur of His Eminence Cardinal Gibbons. Baltimore: John Murphy Company, 1916. p. 333.
- Rev. Richard Stanton. A Menology of England and Wales, or, Brief Memorials of the Ancient British and English Saints Arranged According to the Calendar, Together with the Martyrs of the 16th and 17th Centuries. London: Burns & Oates, 1892. pp. 517–518.

Greek Sources

- Great Synaxaristes: (in Greek) 29 ΟΚΤΩΒΡΙΟΥ. ΜΕΓΑΣ ΣΥΝΑΞΑΡΙΣΤΗΣ.
- (in Greek) Συναξαριστής. 29 Οκτωβρίου. ECCLESIA.GR. (H ΕΚΚΛΗΣΙΑ ΤΗΣ ΕΛΛΑΔΟΣ).
- (in Greek) 29/10/2015. Ορθόδοξος Συναξαριστής.

Russian Sources

- (in Russian) 11 ноября (29 октября). Православная Энциклопедия под редакцией Патриарха Московского и всея Руси Кирилла (электронная версия). (Orthodox Encyclopedia - Pravenc.ru).
- (in Russian) 29 октября по старому стилю / 11 ноября по новому стилю. Русская Православная Церковь - Православный церковный календарь на 2015 год.
