= Saint-Chef =

- Commune
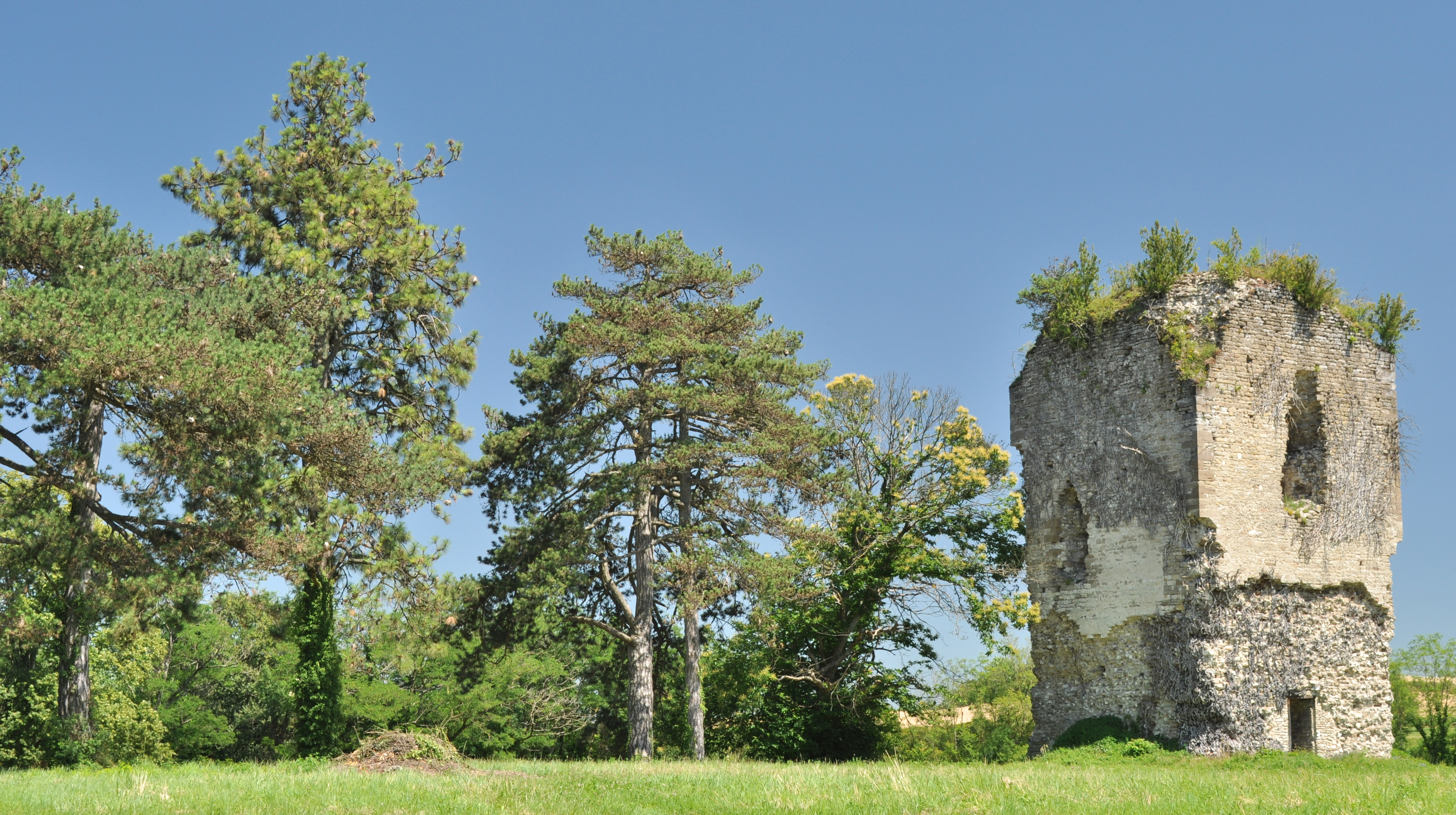
- Tour du Poulet

- Coat of arms
- Location of Saint-Chef
- Location within France Location within Auvergne-Rhône-Alpes
- Coordinates: 45°38′05″N 5°21′59″E
- Country: France
- Region: Auvergne-Rhône-Alpes
- Department: Isère
- Arrondissement: La Tour-du-Pin
- Canton: Bourgoin-Jallieu

Government
  - Mayor (2020–2026): Alexandre Drogoz
- Area^{1}: 27.16 km^{2} (10.49 sq mi)
- Highest elevation: 440 m (1,440 ft)
- Lowest elevation: 218 m (715 ft)
- Population (2023): 3,921
  - Density: 144.4/km^{2} (373.9/sq mi)
- Time zone: UTC+01:00 (CET)
  - Summer (DST): UTC+02:00 (CEST)
- INSEE/Postal code: 38374 /38890
- ^{1} French Land Register data, which excludes lakes, ponds, glaciers > 1 km^{2} (0.386 sq mi or 247 acres) and river estuaries.

Saint-Chef (French pronunciation: [sɛ̃ ʃɛf]) is a commune in the Isère department in southeastern France.

The commune is named after Saint Chef, who was born in the nearby hamlet of Arcisse.

== Climate ==
Saint-Chef has a semi-continental climate characterized by generally higher rainfall in spring and summer than in winter.

However, summers are hot and experience many intense stormy periods. Winters are generally quite cold and marked by frequent frosts, especially since the sector which has remained marshy for a very long time is often marked by numerous morning mists and more or less persistent fogs during cold periods.

== Hydrology ==
The territory of Saint-Chef is criss-crossed by two small streams, the Saint-Savin stream to the south and the Ver stream to the north.

== History ==
The abbey Saint-Chef develops over time. The abbey church dates from the 10th and 11th centuries. A first castle is built on the north hill. It will be followed by two others, later, still on the same hill but further west. After the French Revolution, the abbey was dismantled and its buildings re-used for the most part, or destroyed for some others.

Between 1790 and 1794, Saint-Chef absorbed the communes of Arcisses, Chamont, Crucilleux, Laval-de-Saint-Chef, Montcarra, Trieux and Vercin.

The current mayor is Alexandre Drogoz who replaced Noël Rolland in 2020.

=== Abbey of Saint-Chef ===
This abbey was founded around the year 500. The 12th and 13th century Saint-Theudère church, with its flamboyant Gothic portal and its organ, was listed as a historic monument in 1840 by Prosper Mérimée.

The main building houses one of the most important sets of Romanesque frescoes in France dating from the twelfth century, on the theme of the Apocalypse, also classified as a historic monument. The historical and artistic interest of its frescoes has earned them reproductions in the Cité de l'Architecture et du Patrimoine of Paris.

Quelques photos de l'abbaye de Saint-Chef

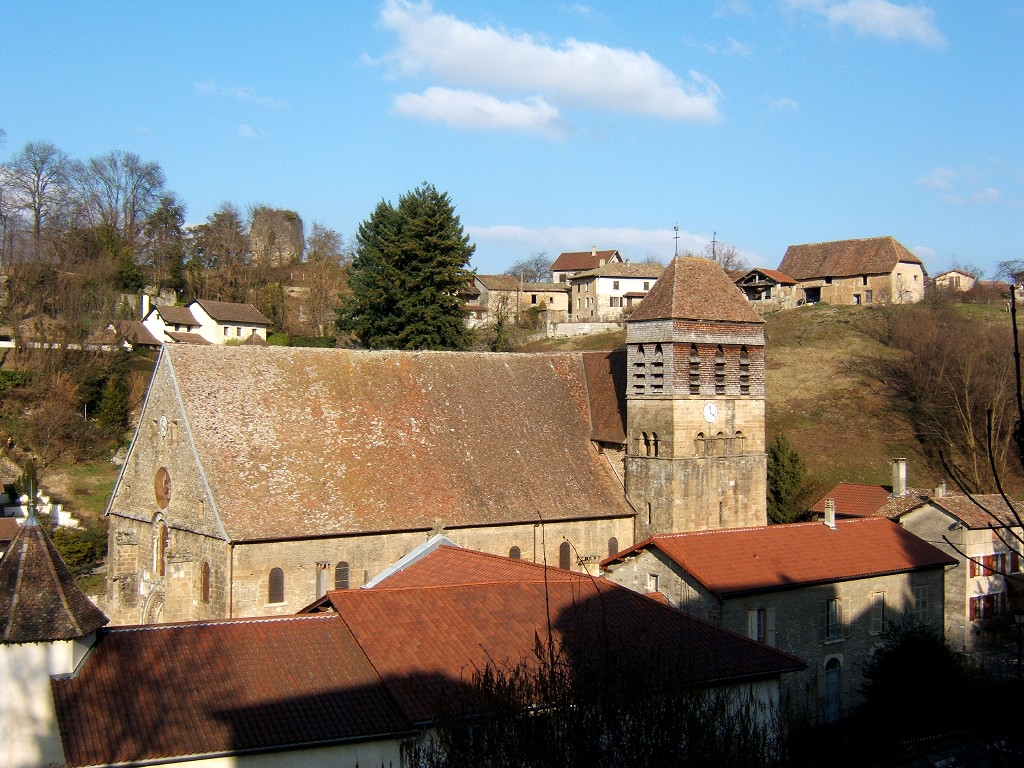
Vue générale de l'abbatiale.

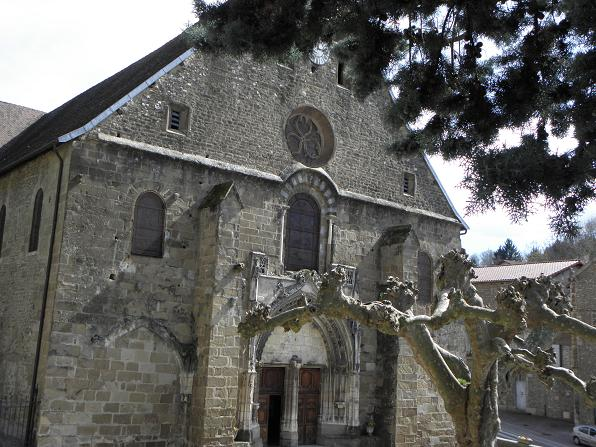
La façade ouest.

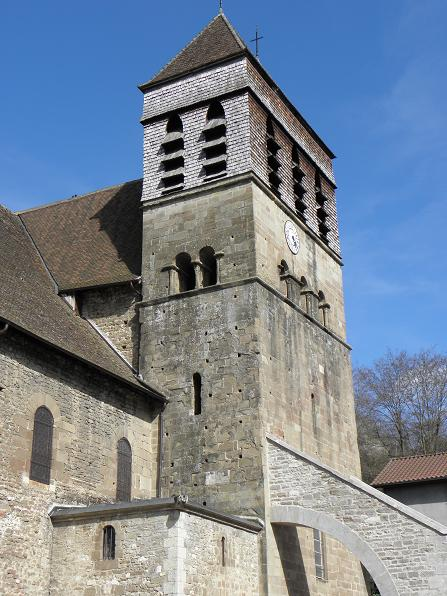
Le clocher.

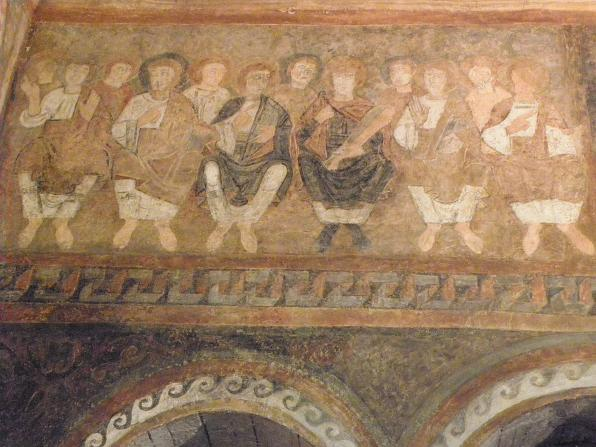
Fresque : les Vieillards de l'Apocalypse.

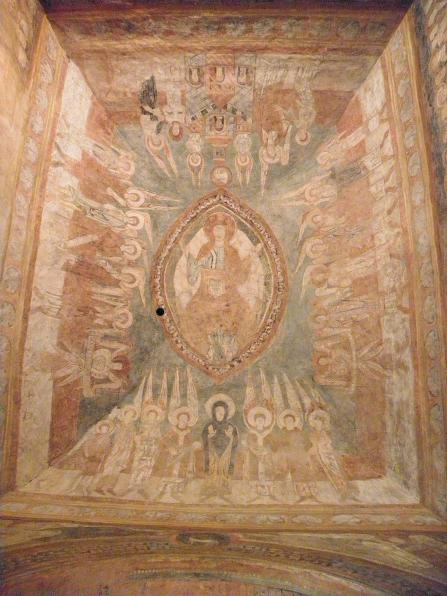
Fresque : le Christ en majesté.

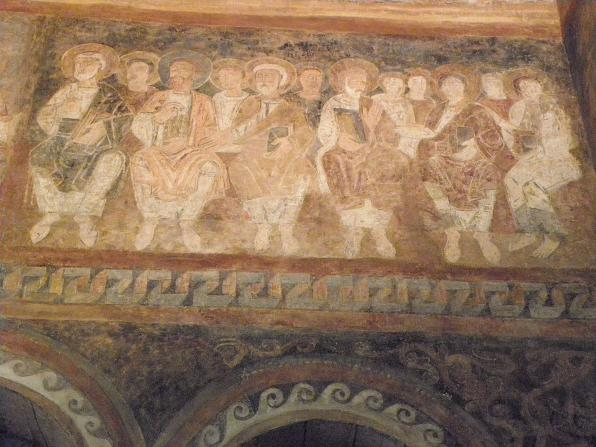
Fresque : les apôtres.

=== Saint-Barthélémy de Chamont church ===
Located three kilometers from the main body of the village, in the hamlet of Chamont, this church was erected in 1879. In 1982, it became disused but, in 2001, an association close to the Lyon priory of the Priestly Fraternity of Saint-Pie-X bought building. Since then, it has been served by its priests officiating there according to the Tridentine form of the Roman rite.

== Population ==
Historical population
Year	Pop.	±% p.a.
1968	1,335	—
1975	1,487	+1.55%
1982	1,798	+2.75%
1990	2,309	+3.18%
1999	2,892	+2.53%
2007	3,295	+1.64%
2012	3,588	+1.72%
2017	3,585	−0.02%
2023	3,921	+1.50%
Source: INSEE

== Notable residents ==
- Hugh of Saint-Cher
- Antoine Pécaudy de Contrecœur

== See also ==
- Communes of the Isère department
