= February 9 (Eastern Orthodox liturgics) =

Day in the Eastern Orthodox liturgical calendar

Eastern Orthodox liturgical calendar
February 8	February 9	February 10
February 9 O.S. ≍ February 22 N.S. February 9 N.S ≍ January 27 O.S.

An Eastern Orthodox cross

February 9 in Eastern Orthodox liturgical calendars is a feast day and a day of commemoration of saints and martyrs. Although some Orthodox churches use the Revised Julian Calendar and others use the traditional Julian calendar, the fixed commemorations for their respective February 9 are broadly the same, no matter which calendar is used. (Note: Despite the dates being the same, the days to which they refer typically differ by 13 days. The notation Old Style or O.S. is sometimes used to indicate a date in the traditional Julian Calendar (the "Old Calendar"). The notation New Style or N.S, indicates a date in the Revised Julian calendar (the "New Calendar").)

== Feasts ==
- Leavetaking of the Presentation of our Lord. (Note: When the Leavetaking falls within the Triodion the date of the Leavetaking is moved, the Typikon must be consulted in these cases.)

== Saints ==
- Hieromartyrs Marcellus, Bishop of Sicily, Philagrius, Bishop of Cyprus, and Pancratius, Bishop of Taormina, disciples of Apostle Peter (1st century) (Note: Hieromartyr Pancratius of Taormina is also commemorated on July 9. Hieromartyr Marcellus may be the same as Marcian of Siracusa, celebrated in June 14 and also appointed by Apostle Paul as the first bishop of Siracusa in Sicily.)
- Martyrs Ammonius and Alexander of Cyprus, at Solia in Cyprus (c. 248-251) (Note: "At Solum, in Cyprus, the holy martyrs Ammonius and Alexander.")
- Saint Apollonia of Alexandria, martyr (249) (Note: "In the same city, in the reign of Decius, the birthday of St. Apollonia, virgin, who had all her teeth plucked out by the persecutors; then having constructed and lighted a pyre, they threatened to burn her alive, unless she repeated certain impious words after them. Deliberating awhile with herself, she suddenly slipped from their grasp, and feeling an inspiration of the Holy Ghost, rushed voluntarily into the fire which they had prepared. The very authors of her death were struck with terror at the sight of a woman who was more willing to die than they to condemn her.")
- Martyr Nicephorus of Antioch in Syria (c. 257) (Note: "At Antioch, under the emperor Valerian, St. Nicephorus, martyr, who was beheaded and thus received the crown of martyrdom.")
- Venerable Romanus the Wonderworker, of Cilicia, near Antioch (5th century) (see also: November 27)
- Venerable Shio Mgvime of Georgia (6th century) (see also: May 9)
- Hieromartyr Peter, Bishop of Damascus, by the sword (743 or 775) (Note: "Saint Peter was Bishop of Damascus during the reign of Constantine Copronymus (c. 776) and a contemporary of Saint John of Damascus. He was arrested on the orders of the Caliph Walid for castigating the heretical doctrines of the Muslims and the Manichaeans. His tongue was cut out and he was exiled to South Arabia (Arabia Felix), where he continued to teach the true Faith and to serve the holy Mysteries until he entered into the reward of his labours in heaven.' (Synaxarion)) (Note: Note, there is another "Hieromatyr Peter" who was martyred by the Saracens in Damascus, who was also a teacher of the Faith, whose feast day is on October 4 - "Martyr Peter of Capetolis" However it looks like he is a separate individual.)

== Pre-Schism Western saints ==
- Martyr Alexander of Rome and thirty-eight other martyrs with him. (Note: "At Rome, the passion of the holy martyrs Alexander, and thirty-eight others crowned with him.")
- Martyrs Ammon, Emilian, Lassa and Companions, a group of forty-four Christians martyred in Membressa in Africa.
- Martyrs Primus and Donatus, two Deacons in Lavallum in North Africa martyred by Donatists (362) (Note: "In Africa, in a village called Lemelis, the holy martyrs Primus and Donatus, deacons, who were killed by the Donatists for defending an altar in the church.")
- Saint Nebridius, Bishop of Egara near Barcelona in Spain, a city since destroyed (c. 527)
- Saint Sabinus of Canosa, Bishop of Canosa in Apulia in Italy and Confessor, and a friend of St Benedict (c. 566) (Note: He was entrusted with an embassy (535-536) to the Emperor Justinian. He is the patron saint of Bari where his relics are now enshrined.)
- Saints Aemilianus and Bracchio, of Tours in Gaul (6th century)
- Saint Teilo (Theliau, Teilan, Dillo, Dillon), Bishop of Llandaff, Wales (6th century) (Note: Probably born in Penally near Tenby in Wales. He was a disciple of St Dyfrig and a friend of Sts David and Samson. He founded Llandaff monastery (Landeio Fawr) in Dyfed where he was buried.)
- Saint Einion Frenin (Eingan, Eneon, Anianus), a British prince who left Cumberland for Wales and became a hermit at Llanengan near Bangor (6th century)
- Saint Ansbert of Rouen, third abbot of Fontenelle Abbey and then Bishop of Rouen (c. 700) (Note: "In the monastery of St. Vandrille, St. Ansbert, bishop of Rouen.")
- Saint Cuaran (Curvinus, Cronan), a bishop in Ireland, called 'the Wise' - on account of his knowledge of the canons - who hid his identity to become a monk at Iona, where he was recognised by St Columba (c. 700)
- Saint Alto of Altomünster, founder of Altomünster Abbey (c. 760) (Note: Born in Ireland, he went to Germany and settled as a hermit in a forest near Augsburg. There he founded a monastery, now called Altomünster after him.)

== Post-Schism Orthodox saints ==
- Venerable Pancratius, hieromonk of the Kiev Caves Monastery (13th century)
- Saints Gennadius (c. 1516) and Nicephorus (1557) monks, of Vazhe Lake, Vologda.

=== New martyrs and confessors ===
- New Hieromartyr Basil Ismailov, Archpriest, of Belorussia (1930)
- New Hieromartyr John Fryazinov, Priest (1938)

== Other commemorations ==
- Uncovering of the relics (1805) of St. Innocent, Bishop of Irkutsk (1731)
- Uncovering of the relics (1992) of New Hiero-confessor Tikhon, Patriarch of Moscow and all Russia (1925) (Note: St. Tikhon's relics were believed lost but they were discovered on 19 February (6 February) 1992 (or, according to another source, 22 February (9 February). They were concealed in the Donskoy Monastery and were almost entirely incorrupt.)
- Repose of Maria, desert-dweller of Olonets (1860)

== Icon gallery ==
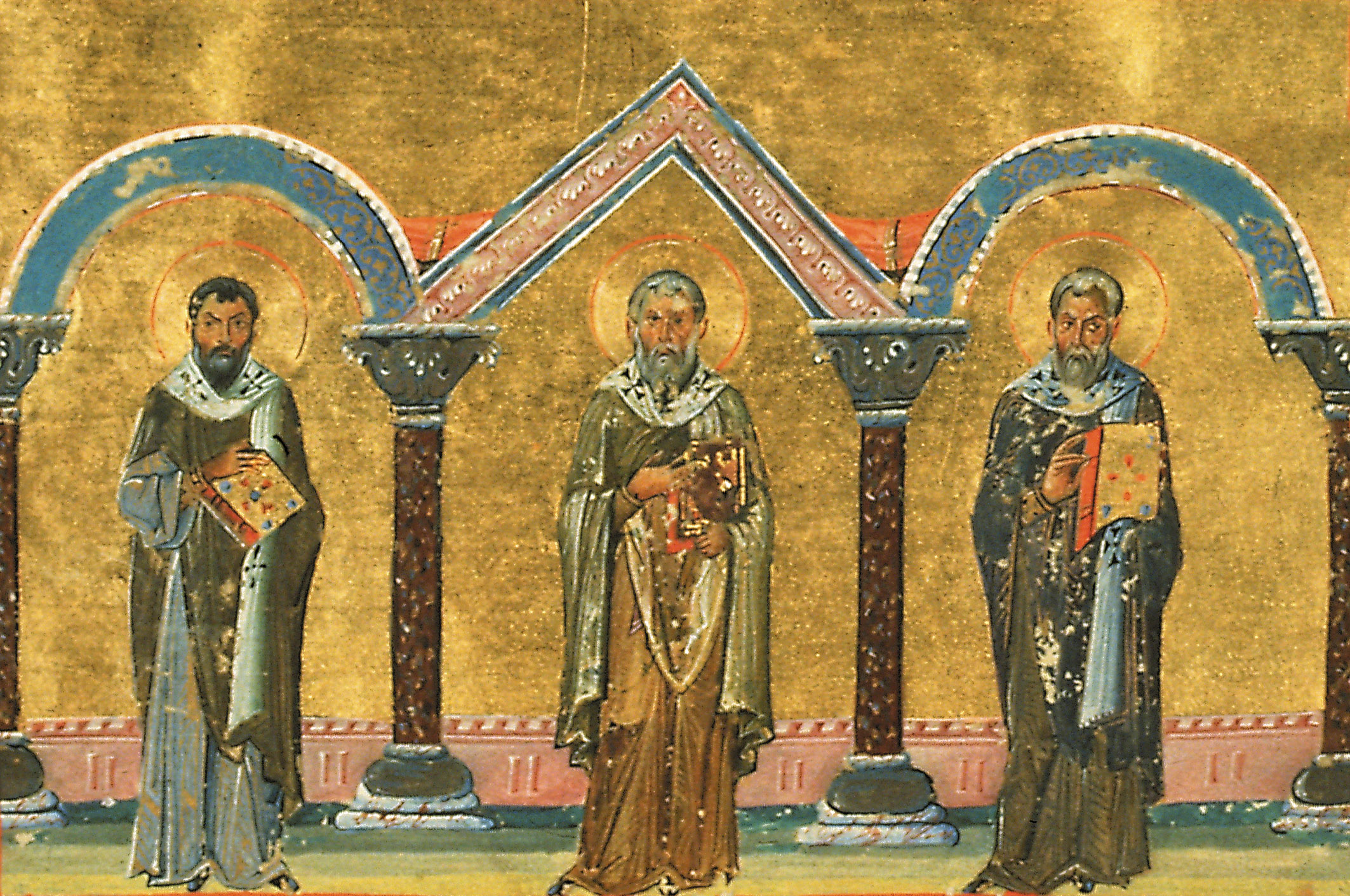
Hieromartyrs Marcellus, Bp. of Sicily, Philagrius, Bp/ of Cyprus and Pancratius, Bp. of Taormina.

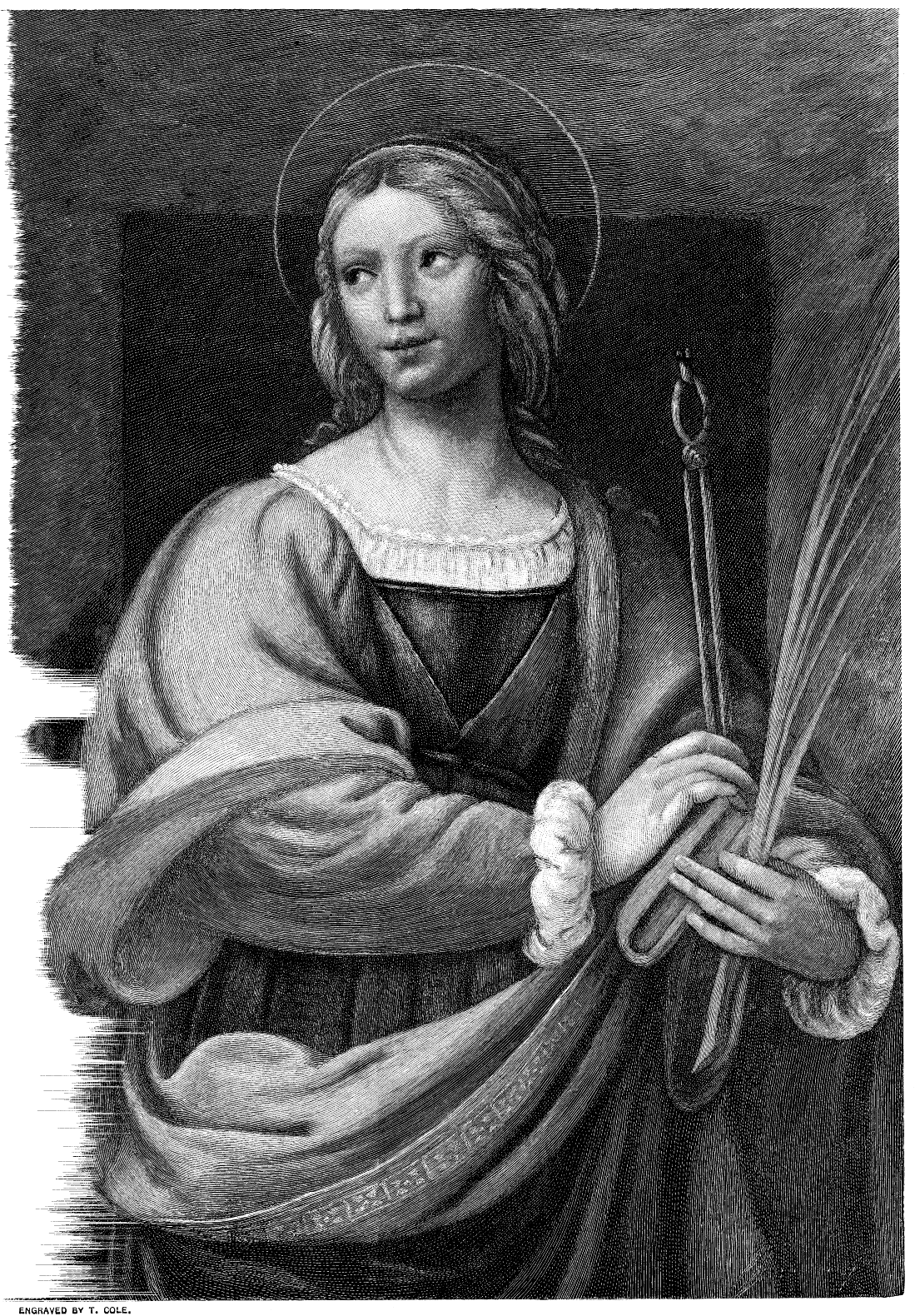
St Apollonia of Alexandria.

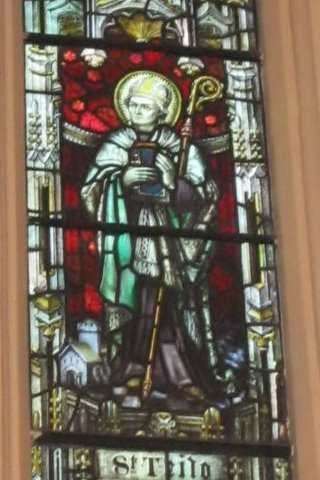
St Teilo, Bishop of Llandaff.

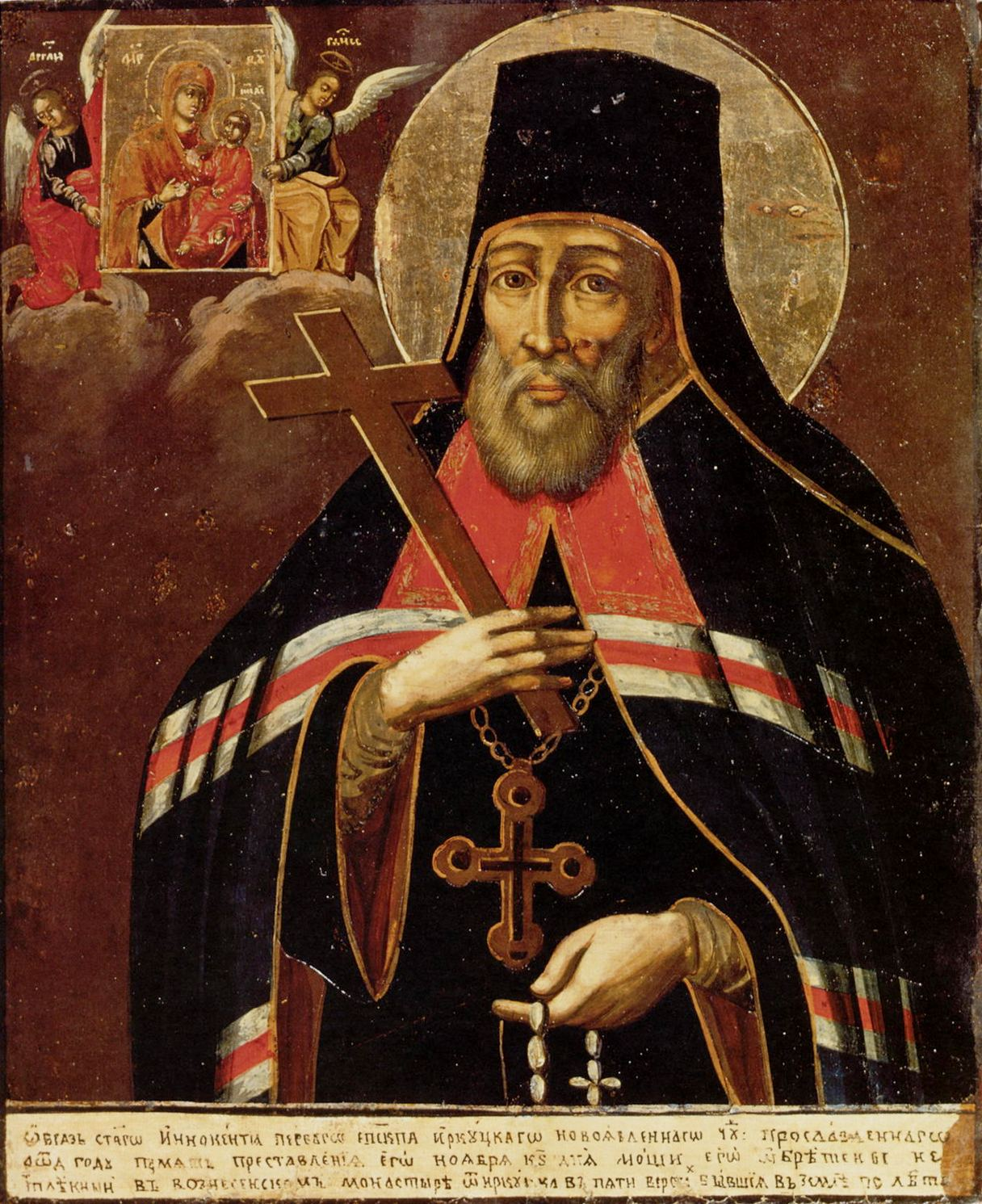
St. Innocent of Irkutsk.

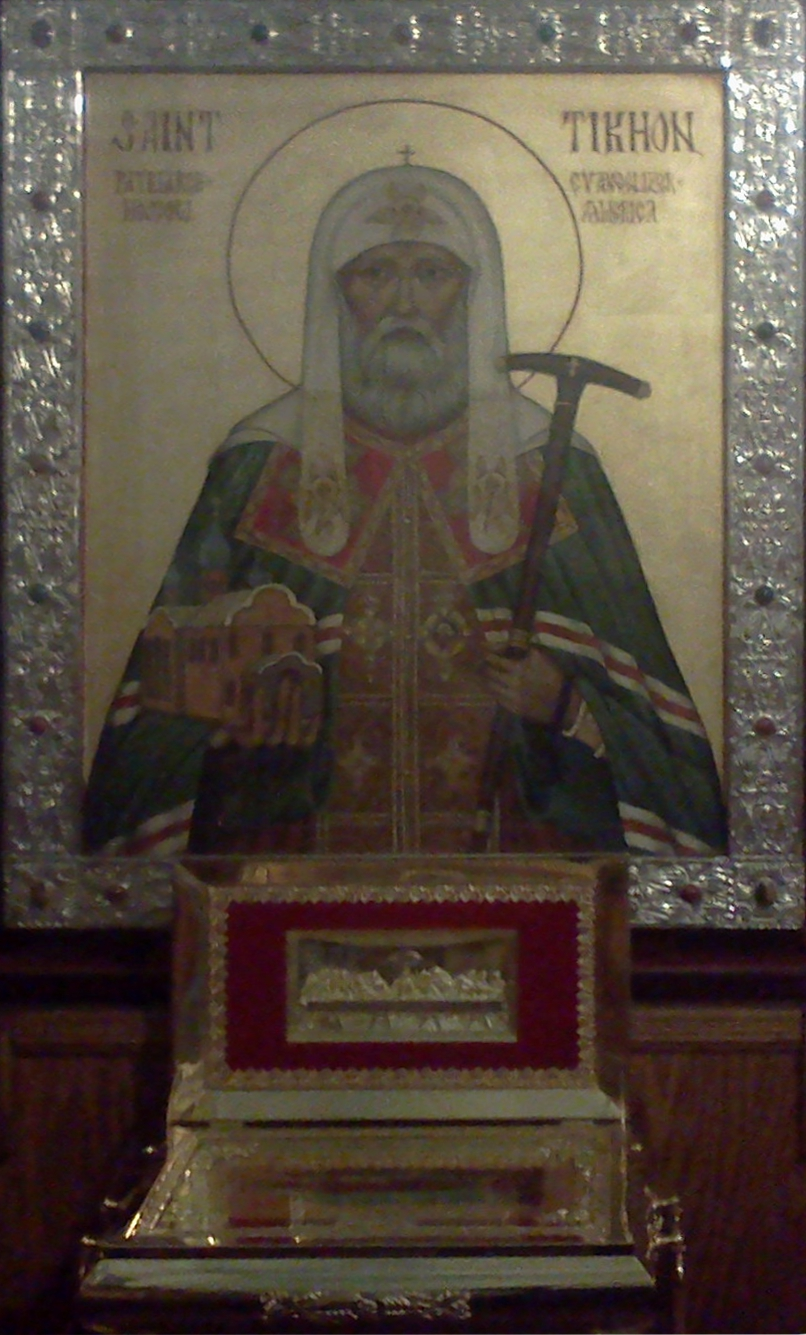
Icon with requilary of Saint Tikhon of Moscow.

== Sources ==
- February 9 / 22. Orthodox Calendar (Pravoslavie.ru).
- February 22 / 9. Holy Trinity Russian Orthodox Church (A parish of the Patriarchate of Moscow).
- February 9. OCA - The Lives of the Saints.
- The Autonomous Orthodox Metropolia of Western Europe and the America. St. Hilarion Calendar of Saints for the year of our Lord 2004. St. Hilarion Press (Austin, TX). p. 14.
- The Ninth Day of the Month of February. Orthodoxy in China.
- February 9. Latin Saints of the Orthodox Patriarchate of Rome.
- The Roman Martyrology. Transl. by the Archbishop of Baltimore. Last Edition, According to the Copy Printed at Rome in 1914. Revised Edition, with the Imprimatur of His Eminence Cardinal Gibbons. Baltimore: John Murphy Company, 1916. pp. 42–43.
- Rev. Richard Stanton. A Menology of England and Wales, or, Brief Memorials of the Ancient British and English Saints Arranged According to the Calendar, Together with the Martyrs of the 16th and 17th Centuries. London: Burns & Oates, 1892. pp. 60–61.

Greek Sources

- Great Synaxaristes: (in Greek) 9 Φεβρουαρίου. Μεγασ Συναξαριστησ.
- (in Greek) Συναξαριστής. 9 Φεβρουαρίου. Ecclesia.gr. (H Εκκλησια Τησ Ελλαδοσ).

Russian Sources

- (in Russian) 22 февраля (9 февраля). Православная Энциклопедия под редакцией Патриарха Московского и всея Руси Кирилла (электронная версия). (Orthodox Encyclopedia - Pravenc.ru).
