= Asterius, Claudius and Neon =

Group of Christian martyrs

Saints Asterius, Claudius and Neon and Companions
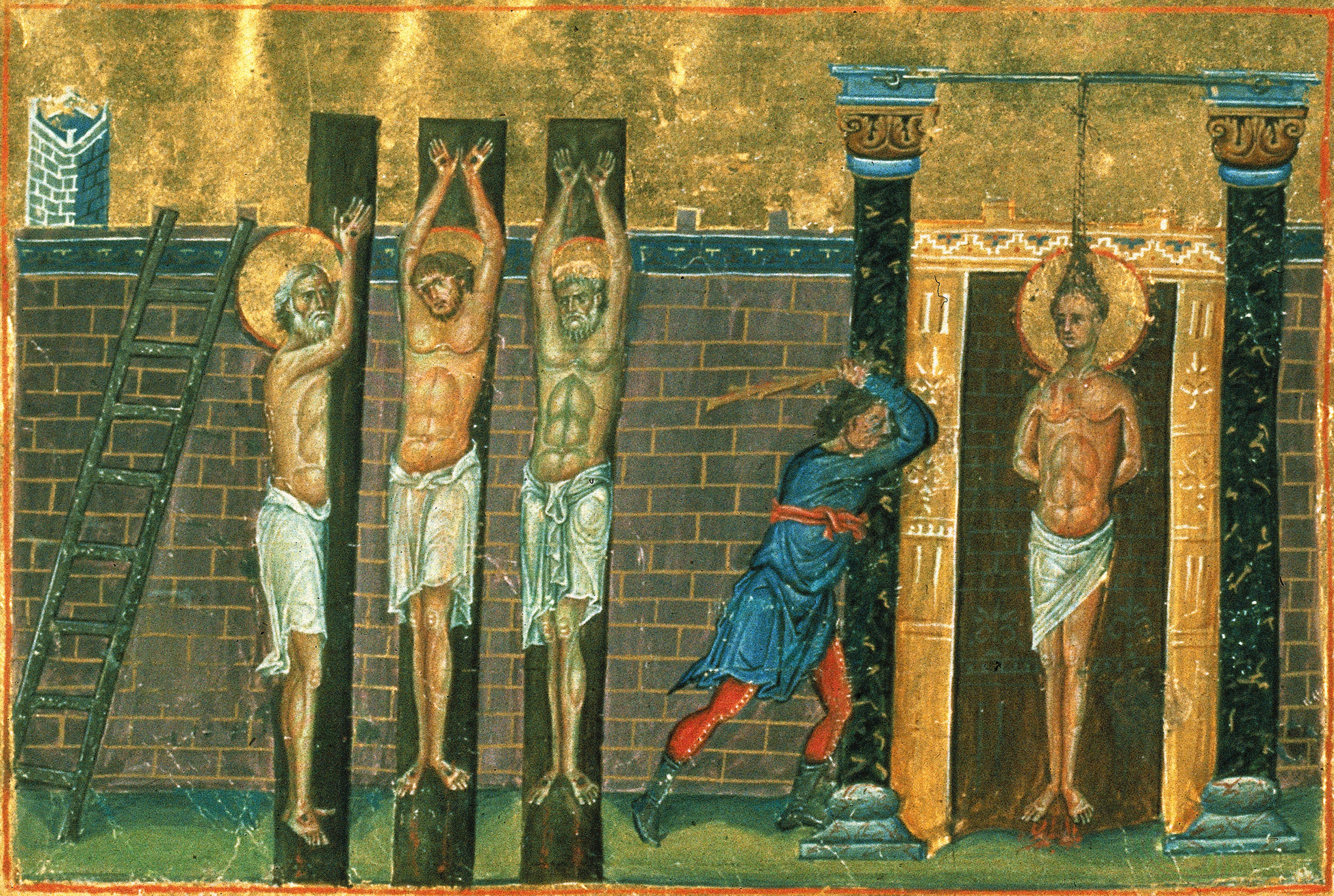
- The martyrdom of Asterius, Claudius, Neon and companions depicted in the 11th century Menologion of Basil II.

Martyrs
- Died: 303 Aegae, Cilicia
- Venerated in: Roman Catholic Church; Eastern Orthodox Church
- Canonized: Pre-congregation
- Feast: 23 August (Roman Catholic Church), 29 October (Eastern Orthodox Church)

Asterius, Claudius and Neon (Greek: Άστέριος, Κλαύδιος & Νεών) were a group of brothers who suffered martyrdom. During the persecutions of Diocletian, the three brothers were handed over to the proconsul of Cilicia, Lysias. They were martyred along with two women, Domnina and Theonilla a widow.

== Butler's account ==
The hagiographer Alban Butler (1710–1773) recorded what is known of the trio and their companions in his Lives of the Fathers, Martyrs, and Other Principal Saints. In summary, Christians could be put to death if they refused to give cult to the Roman state's patron deities as part of the Great Persecution of the early 300s AD. The Romans attributed their success as a world power to their collective piety (pietas) in maintaining good relations with the gods. The persecution was widespread but sporadic, as it was up to "the humour of certain governors of provinces" whether and how harshly to implement the edicts. Brothers Claudius, Asterius, and Neon were denounced to the magistrate of Ægea "by their mother-in-law, whose principal view was to possess herself of their estate." They were put under arrest with two unrelated women, Domina and Theonilla, who were held for the same offence.

When Lysias, proconsul of Cilicia, visited the city, he convened a tribunal. "Let them bring before me the Christians whom the officers have delivered to the city magistrate." The prisoners were presented to him one by one and offered "honours and rewards" if the Christians would sacrifice to the Roman gods, and he promised torture and death if they refused. Speaking on behalf of the brothers, Claudius not only refused but blasphemed the state gods. Each brother was tortured, and each refused to recant. The proconsul ordered them crucified. Domina and Theonilla were tortured to death after also refusing to perform the appropriate sacrifice. Once all five had died, "precautions [were taken] with regard to their dead bodies, that the Christians might not get possession of their relics."

== Sources ==
- Butler, Alban (1815), The Lives of the Fathers, Martyrs, and Other Principal Saints: Compiled from Original Monuments and Other Authentic Records, Illustrated with the Remarks of Judicious Modern Critics and Historians, vol. 8, J. Murphy This article incorporates text from this source, which is in the public domain.
