= Innocent of Irkutsk =

Saint, first bishop of Irkutsk (c. 1680–1731)

Saint Innocent of Irkutsk
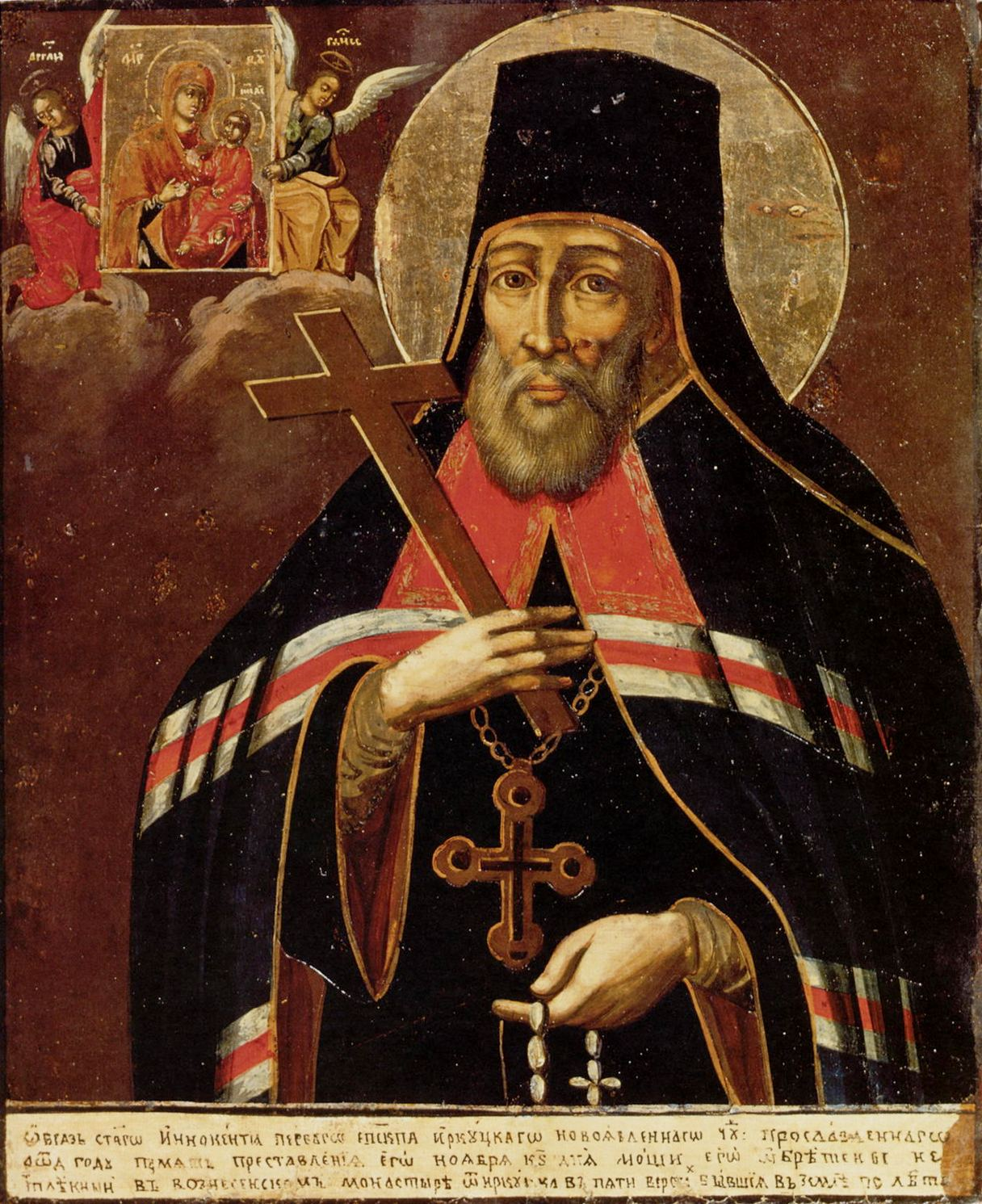

Apostle to Siberia
- Born: c. 1680; Chernigov region, Russia
- Died: November 27, 1731; Irkutsk, Siberia, Russia
- Canonized: February 9, 1804 by The Holy Synod of the Russian Orthodox Church
- Major shrine: Znamensky Monastery, Irkutsk, Siberia, Russia
- Feast: November 26 (repose); February 9 (translation and glorification); September 2 (second translation)

Innocent of Irkutsk (Russian: Иннокентий Иркутский, c. 1680-November 27, 1731) was a missionary to Siberia and the first bishop of Irkutsk in Russia.

He was born Ivan Kulczycki (Иван Кульчицкий, Ivan Kouchitzky) to a noble family in the Diocese of Chernigov. In 1706, he became a monk at the Lavra of the Kiev Caves. Afterwards he was appointed a professor at the Ecclesiastical Academy of Moscow, and then the locum tenens chaplain-general at the Lavra of St. Alexander Nevsky in St. Petersburg.

In 1721, at Lavra Caves Monastery, he was consecrated bishop of Pereyaslavl in preparation for his leadership of the Orthodox mission to China. However, as a bishop he was not permitted entry to China and was therefore appointed to the see of Irkutsk in 1727. While in Irkutsk, he learned Mongolian and preached to the local people, converting many of them. He died in 1731 and was buried beneath the altar of the Tikhvin church, one of the five churches at the Ascension Monastery in the town of Irkutsk.

During restoration work on the church in 1764, Innocent's relics were found to be incorrupt. After numerous miracles attributed to his intercession, he was glorified a saint by the Russian Orthodox Church in 1804. Since the actual date of his repose coincides with the commemoration of the icon of the Theotokos "Of the Sign" of Novgorod, his feast day was moved to the day prior.

In 1921 the Soviet government confiscated his relics and placed them on display in various museums as a "Siberian mummy". The church was burned to the ground. The relics were later returned to the church on September 7, 1990.

He is occasionally confused with the later Innocent of Alaska, who was named in his honor. Because of his appointment as head of the Orthodox mission in China, Innocent is regarded as the patron saint of China by many Chinese Orthodox today.
