= Nemesion =

Saint Nemesion
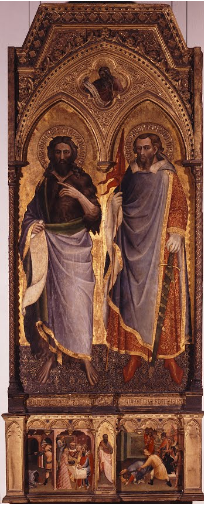
- Saint Nemesius and Saint John the Baptist by Spinello Aretino (1385)
- Born: Egypt
- Died: 250; Alexandria, Egypt
- Canonized: Pre-congregation
- Feast: 19 December or 10 September

Saint Nemesion (or Nemesian, Nemesius, Nemesis; died 250) was an Egyptian martyr in Alexandria, Egypt during the persecutions of Christians by the Roman emperor Decius. A group of other Christians were martyred at the same time. His feast day is 19 December, or 10 September in some calendars.

== Monks of Ramsgate account ==
The monks of St Augustine's Abbey, Ramsgate wrote in their Book of Saints (1921),

Nemesis (St.) M. (Dec. 19)
(3rd cent.) An Egyptian, one of the Martyrs at Alexandria under Decius (A.D. 250). He suffered about the same time as Saint Macarius (December 8), and, to make his Passion more humiliating, he was burned at the stake between two thieves. Eusebius the historian had these and other particulars from an account written by Saint Dionysius, Patriarch of Alexandria, contemporary of the Martyrs.

== Shea's account ==
John Gilmary Shea (1824–1892) in his Pictorial Lives of the Saints wrote,

December 19,— St. Nemesion, Martyr

In the persecution of Decius, Nemesion, an Egyptian, was apprehended at Alexandria upon an indictment for theft. The servant of Christ easily cleared himself of that charge, but was immediately accused of being a Christian, and, after being scourged and tormented more than the thieves, was condemned to be burnt with the robbers and other malefactors. There stood at the same time near the prefect’s tribunal four soldiers and another person, who, being Christians, boldly encouraged a confessor who was hanging on the rack. They were taken before the judge, who condemned them to be beheaded; but was astonished to see the joy with which they walked to the place of execution. Heron, Ater, and Isidore, all Egyptians, with Dioscorus, a youth only fifteen years old, were committed at Alexandria in the same persecution. After enduring the most cruel rending and disjointing of their limbs, they were burnt alive, with the exception of Dioscorus, whom the judge discharged on account of the tenderness of his years.

== Butler's account ==
The hagiographer Alban Butler (1710–1773) wrote in his Lives of the Fathers, Martyrs, and Other Principal Saints under December XIX,

St. Nemesion, M., &c.
From St. Dionysius of Alex. quoted by Eusebius, Hist. l. 6, c. 41, p. 307, ed. Cantabr.
A.D. 250.

IN the persecution of Decius, Nemesion, an Egyptian, was apprehended at Alexandria upon an indictment for theft. The servant of Christ easily cleared himself of that charge, but was immediately accused of being a Christian. Hereupon he was sent to the Augustal prefect of Egypt, and confessing his faith at his tribunal, he was ordered to be scourged and tormented doubly more grievously than the thieves: after which he was condemned to be burnt with the most criminal amongst the robbers and other malefactors; whereby he had the honour and happiness more perfectly to imitate the death of our divine Redeemer.

There stood at the same time near the prefect’s tribunal four soldiers, named Ammon, Zeno, Ptolemy, and Ingenuus, and another person, whose name was Theophilus, who, being Christians, boldly encouraged a confessor who was hanging on the rack. They were soon taken notice of, and presented to the judge, who condemned them to be beheaded: but was himself astonished to see the joy with which they walked to the place of execution.

Heron, Ater, and Isidore, both Egyptians, with Dioscorus, a youth only fifteen years old, were committed at Alexandria in the same persecution. First of all the judge took the youth in hand, and began to entreat him with fair speeches; then he assailed him with various torments; but the generous youth neither would bow at his flatteries, nor could be terrified or broken by his threats or torments. The rest, after enduring the most cruel rending and disjointing of their limbs, were burnt alive. But the judge discharged Dioscorus, on account of the tenderness of his years, saying, he allowed him time to repent, and consult his own advantage, and expressing that he was struck with admiration at the dazzling beauty of his countenance. In the Roman Martyrology St. Nemesion is commemorated on the 19th of December, the rest of these martyrs on other days.

SS. Meuris and Thea, two holy women at Gaza in Palestine, when the persecution raged in that city under the successors of Dioclesian, bore up bravely against all the cruelty of men, and malice of the devil, and triumphed over both to the last moment. Meuris died under the hands of the persecutors: but Thea languished some time after she had passed through a dreadful variety of exquisite torments, as we learn from the author of the life of St. Porphyrius of Gaza, written about the close of the fourth century. Their relics were deposited in a church which bore the name of St. Timothy; on whom see August 19.

== Sources ==
- Butler, Alban (1846), The Lives of the Fathers, Martyrs, and Other Principal Saints, vol. XII, New York: D. & J. Sadlier This article incorporates text from this source, which is in the public domain.
- Shea, John Gilmary (1889), Pictorial Lives of the Saints: With Reflections for Every Day of the Year, New York: Benziger brothers
- St. Augustine's Abbey, Ramsgate (1921), The Book of saints : a dictionary of servants of God canonized by the Catholic Church, London: A. & C. Black, ltd.
