= St. Vassa =

Saint Vassa
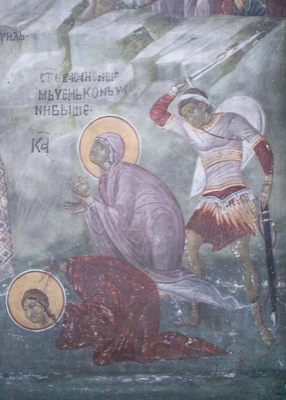
- Serbian Orthodox icon from Gračanica Monastery, 1318.
- Born: 3rd century Roman Empire
- Hometown: Edessa
- Died: Mid- to Late-4th century Macedonia, Roman Empire
- Honored in: Eastern Orthodox Church
- Feast: 21 August

Saint Vassa (Greek: Αγία Βάσσα) was a 4th-century Christian martyr from Edessa in Greek Macedonia. She and her three children were tortured to death. She is venerated on August 21, by the Greek Orthodox Church and Serbian Orthodox Church. A Maronite synaxarium was dedicated to her.
