= Martyrs of Alexandria under Decius =

Saints Julian, Eunos [Chronion], Beza, Justus, Macarius etc. Martyrs
- Died: 250; Alexandria, Egypt
- Feast: 30 October, 27 February

The Martyrs of Alexandria under Decius were a number of Christians (Julian, Eunos [Chronion], Beza, Justus, Macarius etc.) who were martyred in Alexandria, Egypt, under the Roman Emperor Decius (r. 249–251). Their feast day is 30 October.

== Great Synaxaristes ==
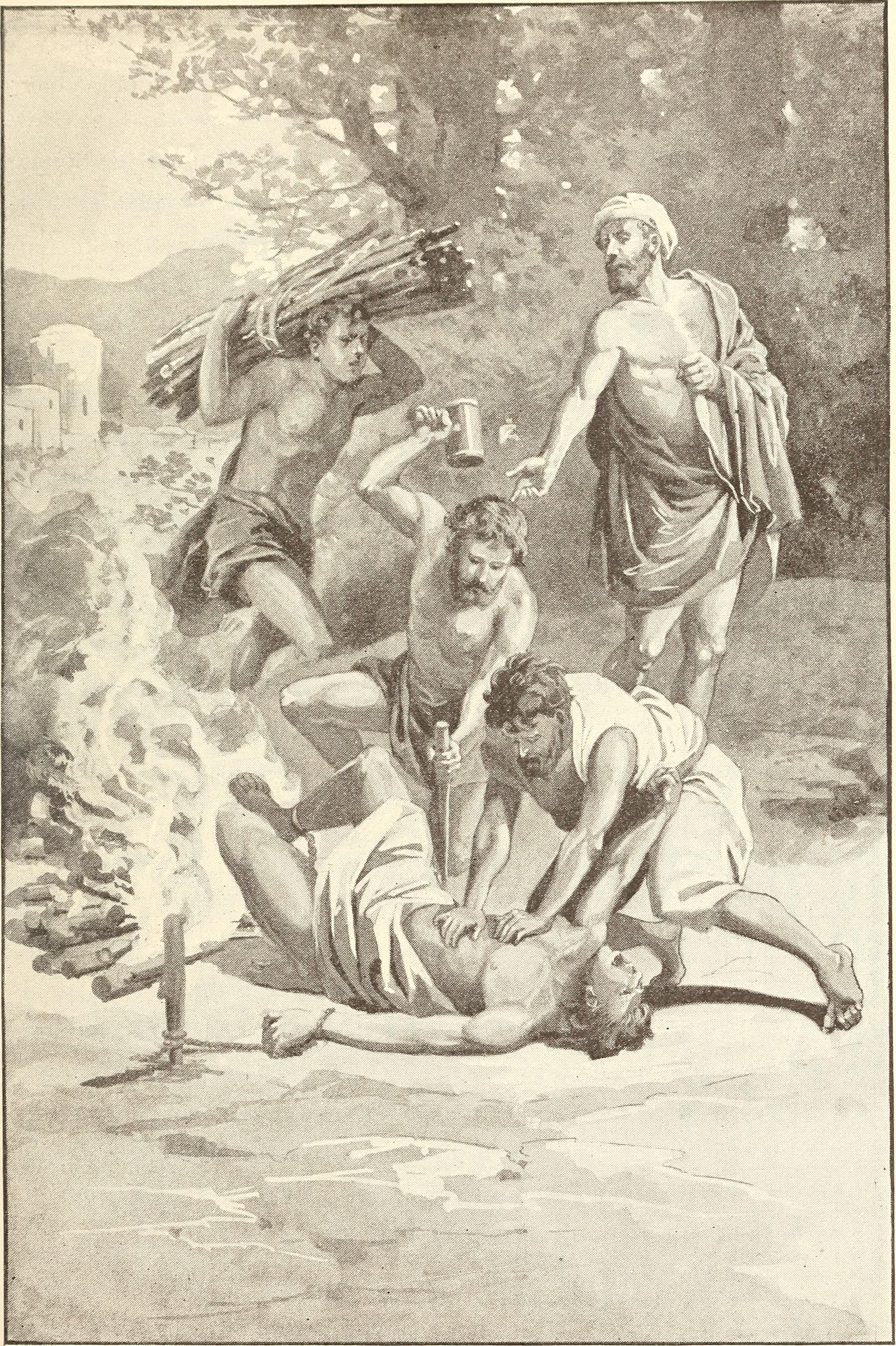
"THE PERSIANS TAKE ANTIOCH AND CRUELLY TORTURE THE CHRISTIANS" (from Christian heroes and martyrs (1895) by William A. Foster

According to the Great Synaxaristes, the martyrs were Coïntas (Quintus), Mitras, Nemesion, Ptolemy, Theophilos, Igenis, Isidoros, Claudius, Epimachus, Eutropios, Zenon, Heron, Ammon, Atir, Besas, Dioskouros, Alexander, Cronion, Julian, Macarius and 13 other martyrs. Coïntas (Quintus) and Mitras were tortured and then killed by having boiled lime poured over them; Nemesios and Ptolemy were cruelly tortured and ultimately beheaded; and of the remaining witnesses, some were burned alive and others were beheaded.

== Monks of Ramsgate account ==
The Monks of Ramsgate wrote in their Book of Saints (1921),

Macarius and Others (SS.) MM. (Oct. 30)
(3rd cent.) On October 30 the Roman Martryology notes a special festival, kept in honour of the thirteen Martyrs who suffered (it would seem) at Alexandria, together with a Saint Macarius, under the Emperor Decius (A.D. 250). Tradition has preserved the names of three among them, Eunus, Julian and Justus.

Julian, Eunus, Macarius and Others (SS.) MM. (Oct. 30)
(3rd cent.) Martyrs in the Decian persecution (A.D. 250) at Alexandria in Egypt. The Greeks commemorate them together, to the number of sixteen, on this day; but so far as can be ascertained, they are identical with others of the same name registered in the Roman Martyrology on various days; SS. Julian and Eunus on Feb. 17; St. Macarius on Dec. 8, etc.

Julian and Eunus (SS.) MM. (Feb. 27)
(3rd cent.) Martyrs at Alexandria in Egypt under Decius (A.D. 250). Julian, too infirm to walk, was carried to the Court of Justice by his two slaves. They were both Christians; but through fear one of them apostatised, while the other, Eunus, bravely shared his master’s lot. They were scourged and then burned to death. Besas, a soldier in guard over them, was condemned and executed merely for having sought to shield them from the insults and outrages of the heathen mob. We have these particulars from Saint Denis of Alexandria, a contemporary and their own Bishop.

== Baring-Gould's account ==
Sabine Baring-Gould (1834–1924) in his Lives Of The Saints wrote under February 27,

SS. Julian, Chronion, and Besas, MM. (A.D. 250.)

[Roman Martyrology; but some on Feb. 19th; by the Greeks on Oct. 30th. Authority:—The contemporary letters by Dionysius, B. of Alexandria, to Germanus, quoted by Eusebius, Hist. Eccles. vi., c. 41.]

SAINT DIONYSIUS, bishop of Alexandria, in a letter describing the sufferings of his church during the persecutions of Decius, after having lamented the apostacy of some, adds: "But others remained firm and blessed pillars of the Lord, confirmed by the Lord himself, and receiving of Him strength suited to their measure of faith, proved admirable witnesses of His kingdom. The first of these was Julian, a man afflicted with the gout, neither able to walk nor to stand, who, with two others that carried him, was arraigned. Of these, the one immediately denied his faith, but the other, named Chronion, surnamed Eunus, and the aged Julian himself, having confessed the Lord, were carried on camels through the whole city, a very large one, as you know, and were scourged, and finally consumed in an immense fire, in the midst of a crowd of spectators. But a soldier, named Besas, standing near, having opposed the insolence of the multitude whilst these martyrs were on the way to execution, was assailed by them with loud shouts, and this brave soldier of God, after he had excelled in the great conflict of piety, was beheaded."

Relics at Autun.

== Butler's account ==
The hagiographer Alban Butler (1710–1773) wrote in his Lives of the Fathers, Martyrs, and Other Principal Saints under February 27,

SS. Julian, Chronion, and Besas, MM.

WHEN the persecution of Decius filled the city of Alexandria with dread and terror, many, especially among the nobles, the rich, and those who held any places in the state, sacrificed to idols, but pale and trembling, so as to show they had neither courage to die, nor heart to sacrifice. Several generous soldiers repaired the scandal given by these cowards. Julian who was grievously afflicted with the gout, and one of his servants, called Chronion, were set on the backs of camels, and cruelly scourged through the whole city, and at length were consumed by fire. Besas, a soldier, was beheaded. See St. Dionysius of Alex, in Eusebius, l. 6. c. 41. ed Val.

== See also ==
- Decian persecution

== Sources ==
- "Ἁ Ἁγία Εὐτροπία ἡ Μάρτυς", Great Synaxaristes (in Greek)
- Baring-Gould, Sabine (1897), The Lives Of The Saints, vol. 2, February, London: J. C. Nimmo This article incorporates text from this source, which is in the public domain.
- Butler, Alban (1798), The lives of the primitive fathers, martyrs, and other principal saints, vol. II, J. Moir This article incorporates text from this source, which is in the public domain.
- St. Augustine's Abbey, Ramsgate (1921). The Book of saints : a dictionary of servants of God canonized by the Catholic Church. London: A. & C. Black, ltd. OCLC 671676136. This article incorporates text from this source, which is in the public domain.
