= Theuderius =

Christian monk, abbot and hermit

Saint Theuderius
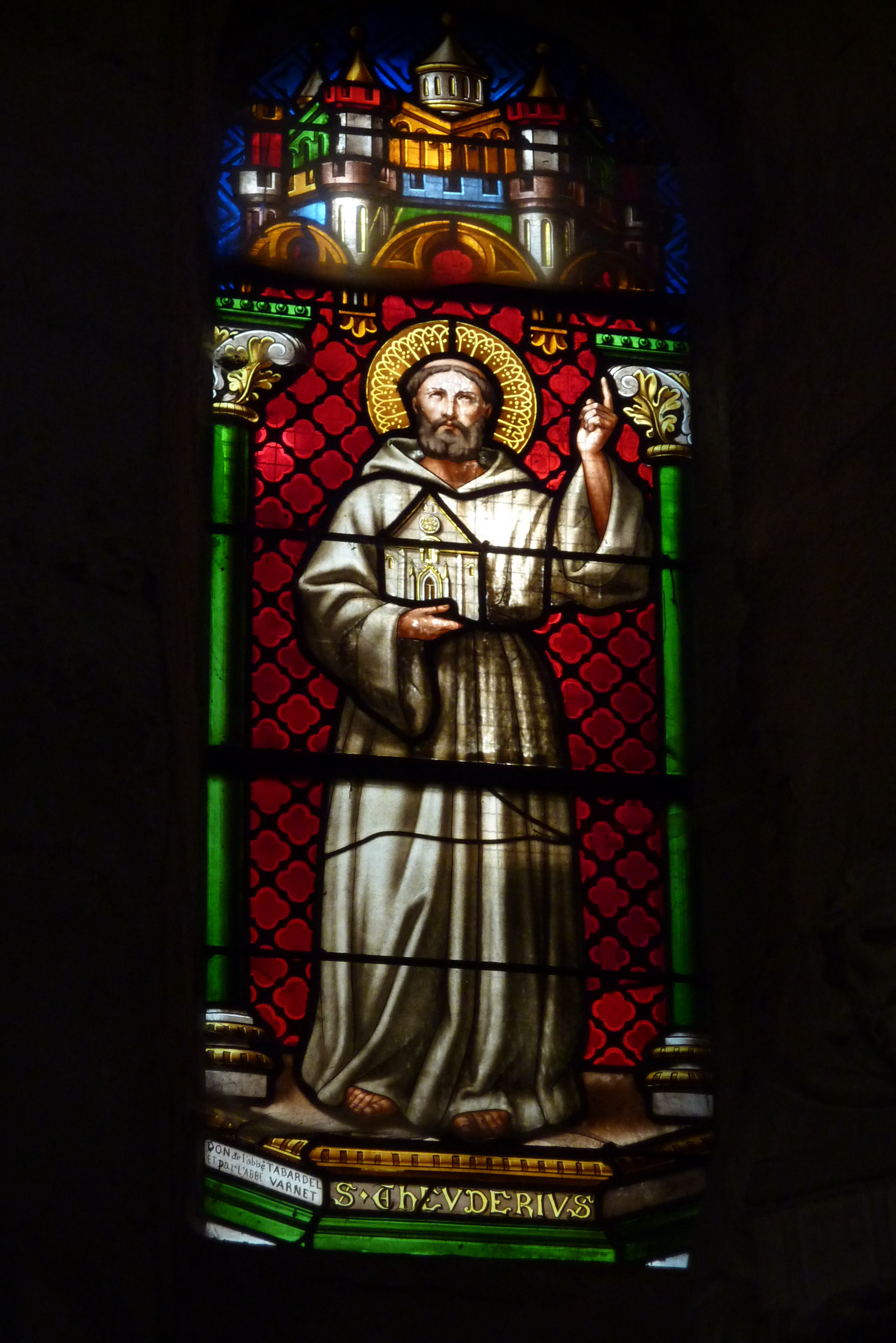
- Stained glass of Saint Theuderius in the Église Saint-Theudère in Saint-Chef
- Born: Arcisse, near Saint-Chef, Dauphiné, France
- Died: c. 575; Church of Saint Lawrence, Vienne, France
- Feast: 29 October

Saint Theuderius (or Theuderis, Theudar, Theodore, Cherf, Chef, French: Theudère de Vienne; died c. 575) was a Christian monk, abbot and hermit. His feast day is 29 October.

== Life ==
Locations in France

Saint Theuderius was born in the 6th century in Arcisse, near the modern commune of Saint-Chef, in Dauphiné, France. He wanted to enter Lérins Abbey on the French Riviera as a monk but Saint Caesarius of Arles ordained him as a priest. He returned to Vienne where a group of disciples gathered round him, and he established at least one monastery for them. He spent the last twelve years of his life in a walled up cell in the Church of Saint Lawrence, Vienne, where he died around 575. He was known as a miracle worker.

== Legacy ==
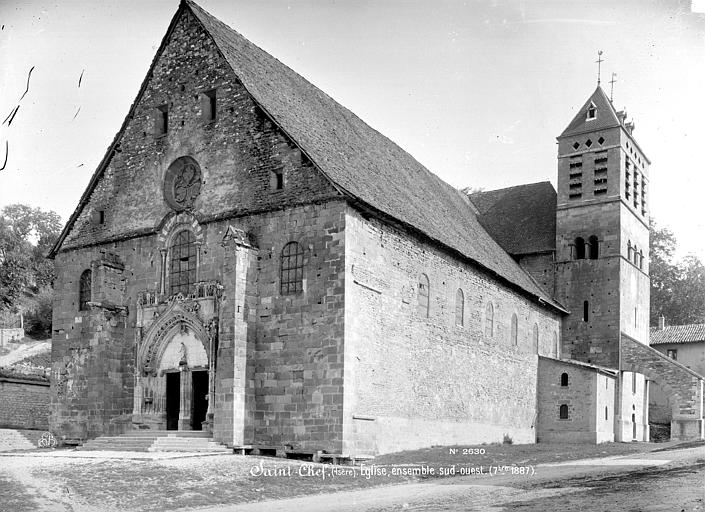
Église Saint-Theudère de Saint-Chef

Saint Theudère is celebrated in the Diocese of Grenoble-Vienne on 29 October.

The commune of Saint-Chef was called Saint-Theudère by the church of Vienne in the earliest days of Christianity. The village may be called Saint-Chef today because of a tradition that the head (caput, chef) of the saint was kept there. Another tradition indicates that the head was that of Saint Thibaud, archbishop of Vienne in the tenth century.

== Monks of Ramsgate account ==
The monks of St Augustine's Abbey, Ramsgate, wrote in their Book of Saints (1921),

THEODORE (THEUDAR) (St.) Abbot. (Oct. 29)
(6th cent.) A holy priest of Vienne in Dauphiné (France), a disciple of St. Cesarius of Arles. He passed his whole life in the doing of good works, and to him the diocese of Vienne owes the erection of several churches and monasteries. He died about A.D. 575. Locally he is known as St. Chef.

== Butler's account ==
The hagiographer Alban Butler ( 1710–1773) wrote in his Lives of the Primitive Fathers, Martyrs, and Other Principal Saints, under October 29,

Saint Chef, in Latin Theuderius, Abbot. Chef, a young gentleman of one of the best families of the city of Vienne, by the interior call of the Holy Ghost, forsook the world; and having long exercised himself in the most perfect practices of a monastic life under the direction of Saint Cæsarius at Arles, returned to his own country, and being joined by several disciples, built for them first cells, and afterwards a monastery near the city of Vienne in Dauphine.

It was anciently a custom in the most regular monasteries, that the hebdomadarian priest who said the community mass, spent the week in which he discharged that function, in the closest retirement in his cell, and in holy contemplation and austere penance, both that he might be better prepared to offer daily the tremendous sacrifice, and that he might more faithfully acquit himself of his mediatorship between God and his people.

It was also a peculiar custom at Vienne in the sixth century, that some monk, of whose sanctity the people entertained a high opinion, was chosen, who should voluntarily lead the life of a recluse, being walled up in a cell, and spending his whole time in fasting, praying, and weeping to implore the divine mercy in favour of himself and his country. This practice would have been an abuse and superstition, if any person relying on the prayers of others, were themselves more remiss in prayer or penance. Saint Chef was pitched upon for this penitential state, which obligation he willingly took upon himself, and discharged with so much fervour as to seem desirous to set no bounds to his tears and mortifications. An extraordinary gift of miracles made his name famous in the whole country.

He died about the year 575, and was buried in the monastery of Saint Laurence. His relics were translated to a collegiate church of which he is the titular patron, and which gives the name of Saint Chef to the town where it stands, in Dauphine, eight leagues from Vienne. This saint is named in the Roman Martyrology. See his life written by Ado, archbishop of Vienne, in Mabill. Saec. 1. Ben. p. 678.

== Longueval's account ==
Jacques Longueval (1680–1735) wrote in his Histoire de l'église gallicane,

Theuderius, commonly called Saint Cherf, came from a noble family in the province of Vienne. After giving away his inheritance he came to Saint Cesaire hoping that he would recommend him as a monk at Lerins monastery. However, Saint Cesaire kept him [in Arles] and ordained him a deacon. Theuderius, after having perfected himself in the practice of Christian virtues, returned to Vienne, where he first built a small oratory near the city in honor of Saint Eusebius of Vercelli. Then, the number of his disciples increasing every day, he built up to four monasteries in the territory of Vienne.

It was the custom of this town to always have a holy monk living as a recluse. The position having become vacant, Philippe, bishop of Vienne, cast his eyes on Saint Theuderius, and enclosed him in a cell near the church of Saint-Laurent. He spent twelve more years in this new kind of life. He was buried in the monastery he had built in honor of the Blessed Virgin, and which was called Saint-Cherf after his name; but so disfigured that it is difficult to recognize it. It is today a collegiate church, and the abbey was united with the archbishopric of Vienna. Saint Theuderius or Saint Cherf is honored on October 29.

== Sources ==
- Butler, Alban (1799), The Lives of the Primitive Fathers, Martyrs, and Other Principal Saints, vol. X, J. Moir
- Charvet, Claude (1761), Histoire de la sainte église de Vienne (in French), Chez C. Cizeron, p. 798
- Histoire: Les grandes figures du diocèse de Grenoble et Vienne (in French), Diocese of Grenoble-Vienne
- Longueval, Jacques (1825), Histoire de l'église gallicane: dédiée à Nosseigneurs du clergé (in French), Bureau de la Bibliothèque Cath.
- "Saint Theuderius", CatholicSaints.info, 20 February 2010
- Teste, Victor (1852), "Essai archéologique sur le monastère de l'église abbatiale de Saint-Chef en Dauphiné", Revue du Lyonnais (in French), IV: 85–94
- St. Augustine's Abbey, Ramsgate (1921), The Book of saints : a dictionary of servants of God canonized by the Catholic Church, London: A. & C. Black, ltd. This article incorporates text from this source, which is in the public domain.
- Zénon Collombet, François (1847), Histoire de la sainte église de Vienne depuis les premiers temps du Christianisme, jusqu'a la suppression du siége, en 1801 (in French), vol. 2, Lyon
