= Cistern of Mocius =

Byzantine open-sky water reservoir built in the city of Constantinople

Coordinates: 41°0′37″N 28°56′05″E

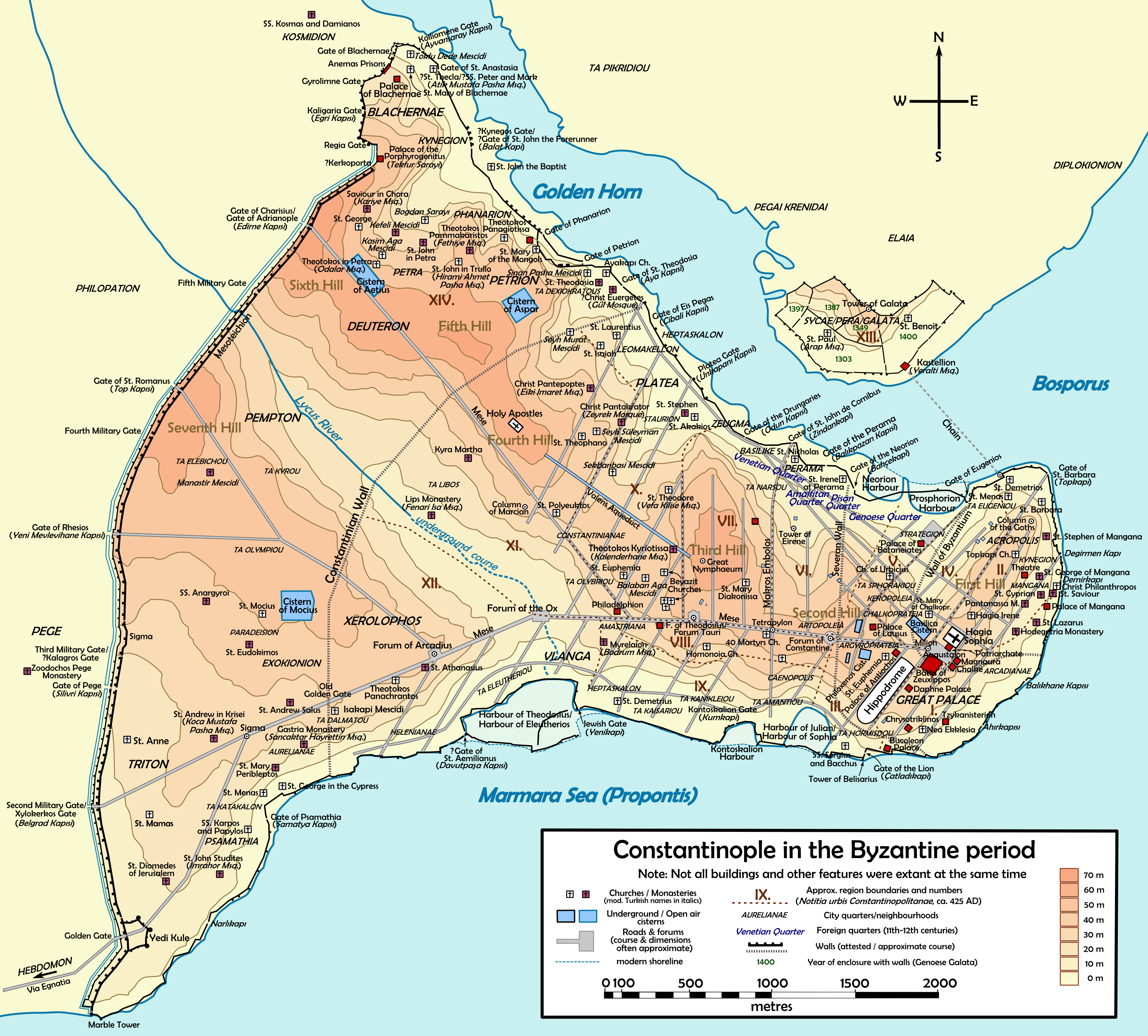
Map of Byzantine Constantinople. The Cistern of Mocius is located in the western part of the city, on the south plateau of the seventh hill.

The Cistern of Mocius (Greek: κινστέρνη τοῦ Μωκίου), known in Turkish as Altımermer Çukurbostanı ("sunken garden of Altımermer"), was the largest Byzantine open-sky water reservoir built in the city of Constantinople.

== Location ==
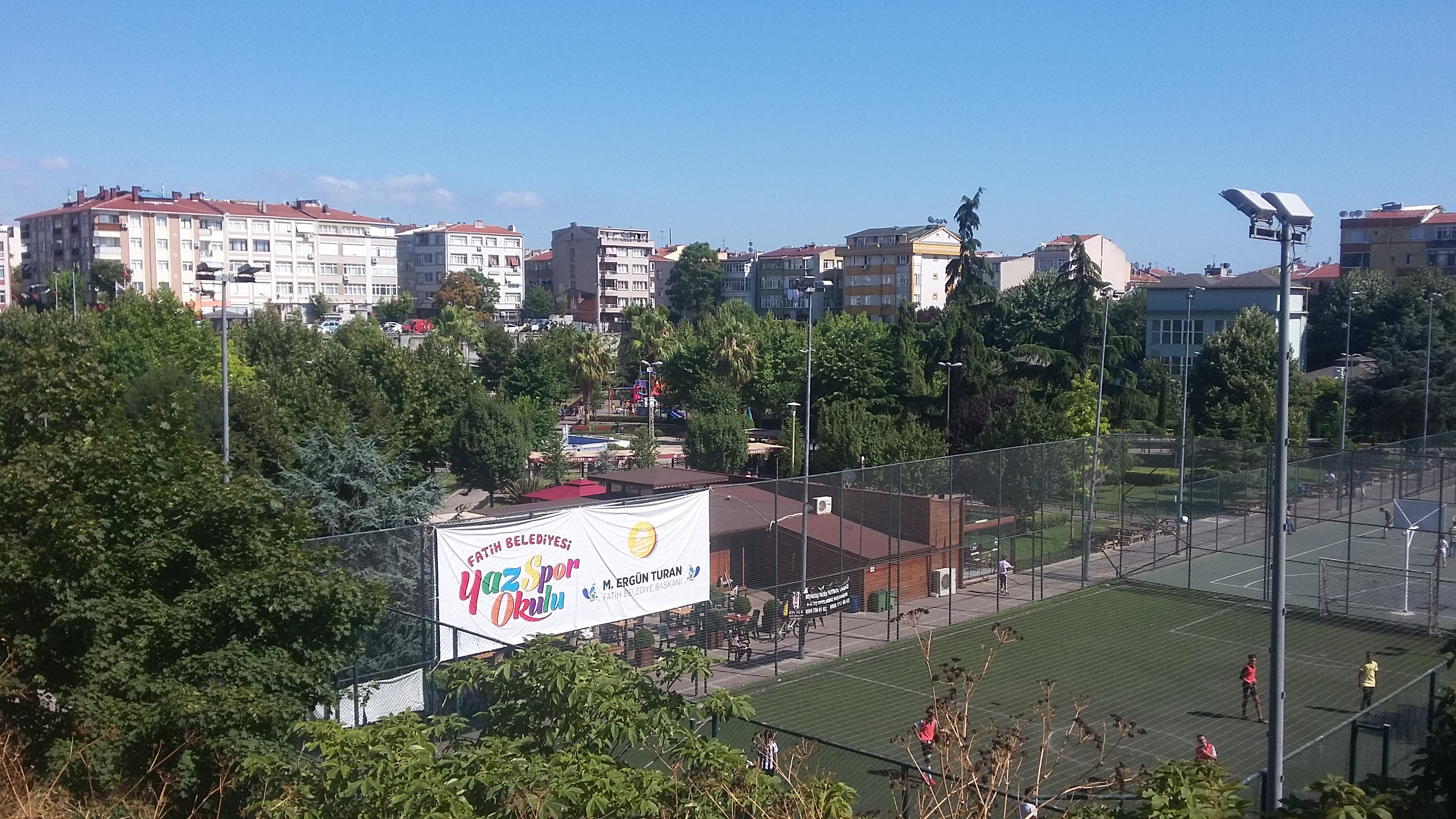
The cistern used today as a sports and social activity area

The cistern is located in Istanbul, in the district of Fatih (the walled city), in the quarter of Altımermer and the mahalle of Seyyid Ömer, to the northeast of the Seyyid Ömer Mosque, between Ziya Gökalp Sokak to the north and Cevdet Paşa Caddesi to the south. It lies on the highest part of the seventh hill of Istanbul, and overlooks the Marmara Sea.

== History ==
According to the Patria of Constantinople, the construction of this cistern, which lay in the twelfth region of Constantinople, occurred under Emperor Anastasius I (r. 491–518). The name came from the important church dedicated to Saint Mocius, which was located near the southwest corner of the reservoir. The cistern, which lay just outside the Wall of Constantine, which formed the city's original landward boundary, was built to supply water to the new quarters erected between the former and the 5th-century Theodosian Walls. Writing after the Ottoman conquest of 1453, the 16th-century French traveler Pierre Gilles observed that around 1540 the reservoir was empty. In the Ottoman period, as its Turkish name Çukurbostan ("hollow garden") betrays, the structure was used as vegetable garden, usage which remained until the end of the 20th century. As of 2014 the area is used as "Educational Park" (Turkish: Fındıkzade Eğitim parkı) of the Fatih district.

== Description ==
The cistern has a rectangular plan with sides 170 metres (560 ft) long and 147 metres (482 ft) wide, and covers an area of 25,000 square metres (270,000 sq ft): this makes of it the largest cistern ever built in Constantinople. Its average depth is unknown, since the reservoir is partly filled with earth, but it should range from 10.50 metres (34.4 ft) to about 15 metres (49 ft), of which 2–4 metres (6.6–13.1 ft) are still visible. The reservoir could contain about 0.260–0.370 million cubic metres (69–98 million US gallons) of water. Its walls, 6.00 metres (19.69 ft) thick and partially still in place, were built using the Roman construction technique opus listatum, by alternating courses of bricks and of stone, an elegant pattern similar to that also used by the similar cisterns of Aetius and of Aspar.

== See also ==
- List of Roman cisterns

== Sources ==
- Mamboury, Ernest (1953). The Tourists' Istanbul. Istanbul: Çituri Biraderler Basımevi.
- Eyice, Semavi (1955). Istanbul. Petite Guide à travers les Monuments Byzantins et Turcs (in French). Istanbul: Istanbul Matbaası.
- Janin, Raymond (1964). Constantinople Byzantine (in French). Paris: Institut Français d'Etudes Byzantines.
- Müller-Wiener, Wolfgang (1977). Bildlexikon zur Topographie Istanbuls: Byzantion, Konstantinupolis, Istanbul bis zum Beginn d. 17 Jh (in German). Tübingen: Wasmuth. ISBN 978-3-8030-1022-3.
- Altun, Feride Imrana (2009). Istanbul'un 100 Roma, Bizans Eseri (in Turkish). Istanbul: Istanbul Buyukșehir Belediyesi Kültür A.Ş. Yayınları. ISBN 978-9944-370-76-9.
