= November 11 (Eastern Orthodox liturgics) =

Day in the Eastern Orthodox liturgical calendar

Eastern Orthodox liturgical calendar
November 10	November 11	November 12
November 11 O.S. ≍ November 24 N.S. November 11 N.S ≍ October 29 O.S.

An Eastern Orthodox cross

November 11 in Eastern Orthodox liturgical calendars is a feast day and a day of commemoration of saints and martyrs. Although some Orthodox churches use the Revised Julian Calendar and others use the traditional Julian calendar, the fixed commemorations for their respective November 11 are broadly the same, no matter which calendar is used. (Note: Despite the dates being the same, the days to which they refer typically differ by 13 days. The notation Old Style or O.S. is sometimes used to indicate a date in the traditional Julian Calendar (the "Old Calendar"). The notation New Style or N.S. indicates a date in the Revised Julian calendar (the "New Calendar").)

== Saints ==
- Martyrs Victor and Stephanida (Corona), at Damascus (160) (Note: Name days celebrated today include: Victor (Βίκτωρας); Victoria (Βικτωρία).)
- Great-martyr Menas of Egypt (304) (Note: Name days celebrated today include: Menas, Mennas (Μηνᾶς).) (Note: "At Cotyæum, in Phrygia, during the persecution of Diocletian, the celebrated martyrdom of St. Mennas, Egyptian soldier, who cast off the military belt and obtained the grace of serving the King of heaven secretly in the desert. Afterwards coming out publicly, and freely declaring himself a Christian, he was first subjected to dire torments; and finally kneeling in prayer, and giving thanks to our Lord Jesus Christ, he was struck with the sword. After his death, he was renowned for many miracles.")
- Martyr Vincent of Spain (Vincent of Saragossa) (304)
- Martyr Drakonas of Arauraka in Armenia, by beheading (304)
- Venerable Theodore the Confessor (Theodore the Studite), Abbot of the Studion (826)

== Pre-Schism Western saints ==
- Saints Valentine, Felician and Victorinus, martyrs venerated in Ravenna in Italy (c. 305) (Note: "At Ravenna, the holy martyrs Valentine, Felician and Victorinus, who were crowned in the persecution of Diocletian.") (see also: November 13)
- Saint Valerius of Saragossa, Bishop of Saragossa and martyr (315)
- Saint Martin the Merciful (Martin of Tours), Bishop of Tours (397) (Note: "AT Tours, in France, the birthday of blessed Martin, bishop and confessor, whose life was so renowned for miracles that he received the power to raise three persons from the dead.") (Note: Born in Upper Pannonia (now Hungary), he was the son of a Roman officer. At the age of fifteen he enrolled in the imperial cavalry. In Amiens in France, where he was posted, he cut his cloak in half and gave his own half to a beggar. This beggar turned out to be Christ. This led to his baptism. He left the army and placed himself in the hands of St Hilary, Bishop of Poitiers, living for ten years as a hermit and founding a monastery in Ligugé. In 372 he was made Bishop of Tours, but he accepted the office with great reluctance. Founding another monastic centre in Marmoutier, he continued to live as a monk, while publicly he devoted himself to his episcopal duties. He opposed Arianism and Priscillianism, but befriended Priscillianists when they were persecuted by the civil authorities. He was the greatest monk in the West of the age and hundreds of churches were dedicated to him. His shrine in Tours was and still is a resort of Orthodox pilgrims.) (see also: October 12, November 12 - East, July 4)
- Saint Veranus, Bishop of Lyon or Vence in France (5th century) (Note: "At Lyon, St. Veranus, bishop, whose life was illustrated by his faith and other virtues.")
- Saint Cynfran, founder of a church in Gwynedd in Wales where there is also a holy well (5th century)
- Saint Rhediw, a saint recalled by the dedication of a church in Llanllyfni in North Wales.
- Saint Mennas, a Greek from Asia Minor who became a hermit in the Abruzzi in Italy, probably in Santomenna (6th century) (Note: "In the province of Abruzzo, blessed Mennas, solitary, whose virtues and miracles are mentioned by pope St. Gregory.")
- Saint Bertuin, born in England, he became a monk at Othelle, then a bishop, and founded the monastery of Malonne Abbey near Namur in Belgium (c. 698)
- Saint-Righteous Hademunda, Margravine of Ebersberg, pilgrim (1029)
- Saint Bartholomew the Younger, of Rossano, Calabria (c. 1054) (Note: A Greek, he was born in Rossano in Calabria in Italy. He followed St Nilus the Younger to the foundation of Grottaferrata in Frascati near Rome and St Bartholomew is considered as its second founder. He persuaded Pope Benedict IX (+1055) to repent for his sins.) (Note: "In the monastery of Crypta-Ferrata, near Frascati, the holy abbot, Bartholomew, companion of blessed Nilus, whose life he wrote.")

== Post-Schism Orthodox saints ==
- Saint Nicodemus the Younger, of Beroea in Macedonia (c. 1305)
- Great-martyr Stephen-Urosh III of Decani (1331)
- Blessed Euthymius and Nestor, of Dečani (14th century)
- Saint Neophytus and Saint Stephen Urosica, of Serbia (14th century)
- Saint Milica of Serbia, Princess of Serbia (Eugenia in schema) (1405)
- Blessed Maximus of Moscow, Fool-for-Christ, Wonderworker (1434) (Note: See: (in Russian) Максим Московский. Википедии. (Russian Wikipedia).)
- Saint Martyrius, founder of Zelenets Monastery, Novgorod (1603) (Note: See: (in Russian) Мартирий Зеленецкий. Википедии. (Russian Wikipedia).) (see also: March 1)

=== New martyrs and confessors ===
- Martyrs of Zelenetsk (1927): (Note: See: (in Russian) Зеленецкий-Троицкий монастырь. Википедии. (Russian Wikipedia).)

- Hegumen Victor with the brotherhood.

- New Hieromartyr Eugene Vasiliev, Priest (1937)

== Other commemorations ==
- Repose of Saint John the Merciful (619-620) (Note: He reposed on November 11, 619 or 620. However his memory was moved to November 12, because on the 11th in Egypt the memory of the Great Martyr Menas of Egypt was solemnly celebrated, and in Constantinople the memory of the Monk Theodore the Studite.)
- Synaxis of the Saints of Dečani.
- Repose of Victor Sadkovsky, Archbishop of Chernigov (1803) (Note: In the 1780s and 1790s he was a central figure in international relations between Russia and the Polish–Lithuanian Commonwealth. From 1785 he was the only Orthodox bishop in Poland and was involved in the conversion of many Uniates to Orthodoxy.) (Note: See: (in Russian) Виктор (Садковский). Википедии. (Russian Wikipedia).)
- Repose of Metropolitan Platon (Levshin) of Moscow (1812)
- Myrrh-streaming "Montreal" Iveron Icon of the Theotokos (1982)

== Icon gallery ==
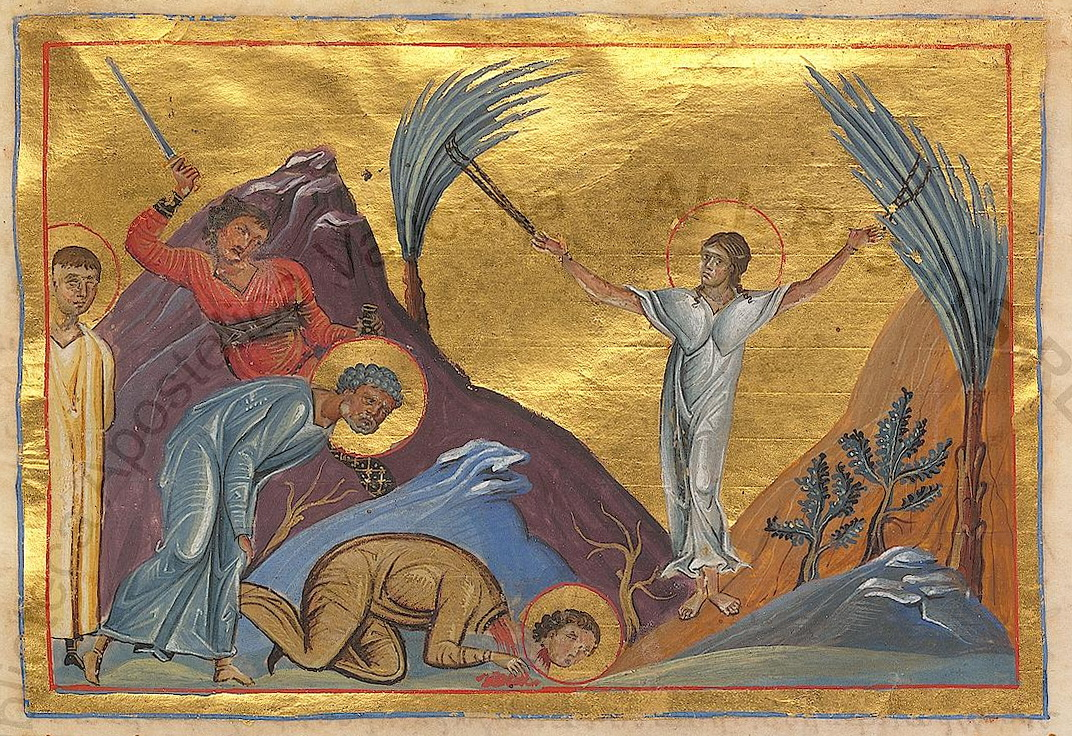
Martyrs Victor and Stephanida at Damascus; Great-martyr Menas of Egypt (shown after beheading); and Martyr Vincent of Spain (Vincent of Saragossa).
(Menologion of Basil II, 10th century).

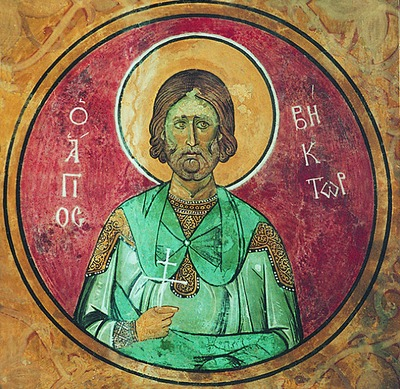
Martyrs Victor of Damascus.

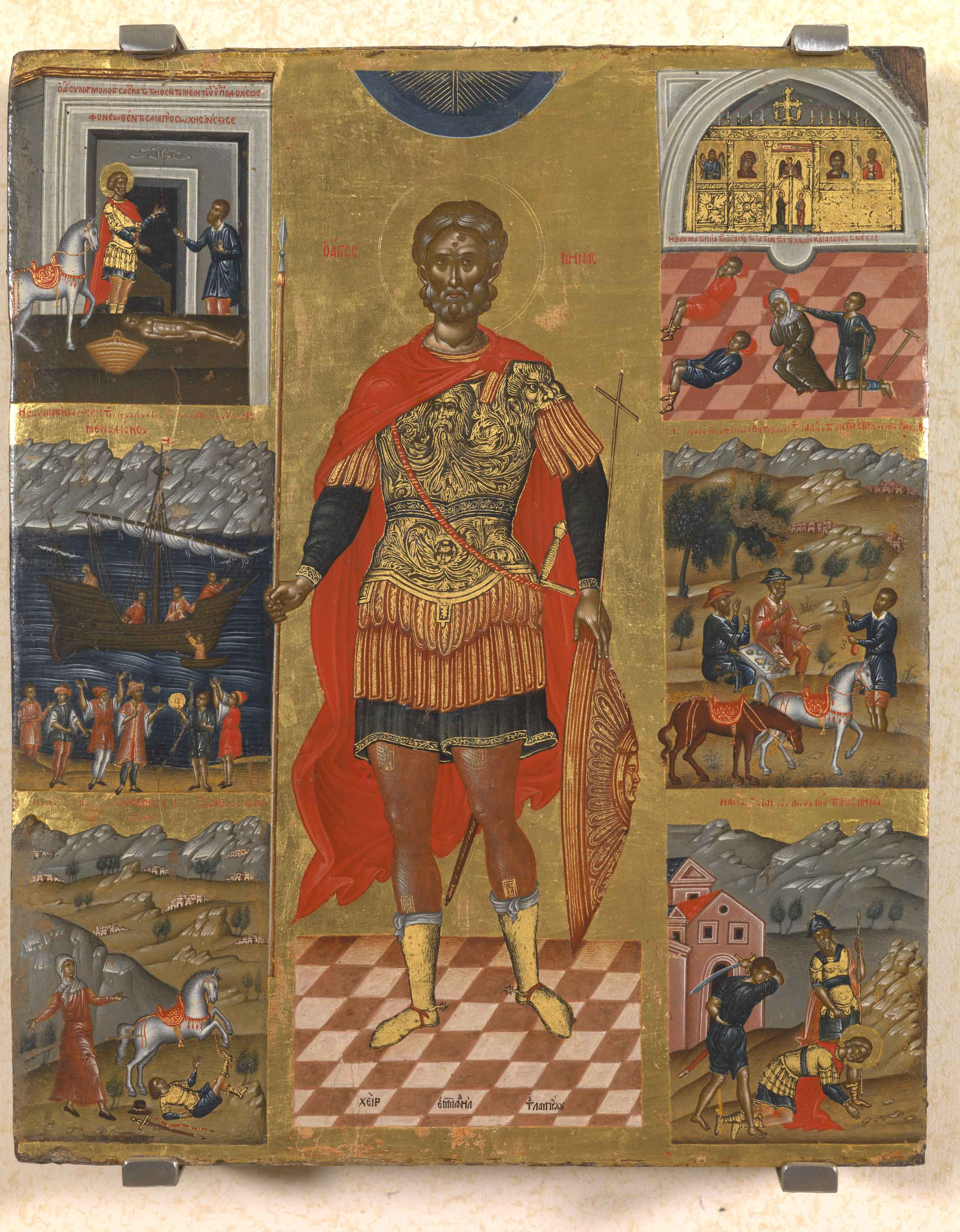
Great-martyr Menas of Egypt.
(Emmanuel Lambardos, 17th century).

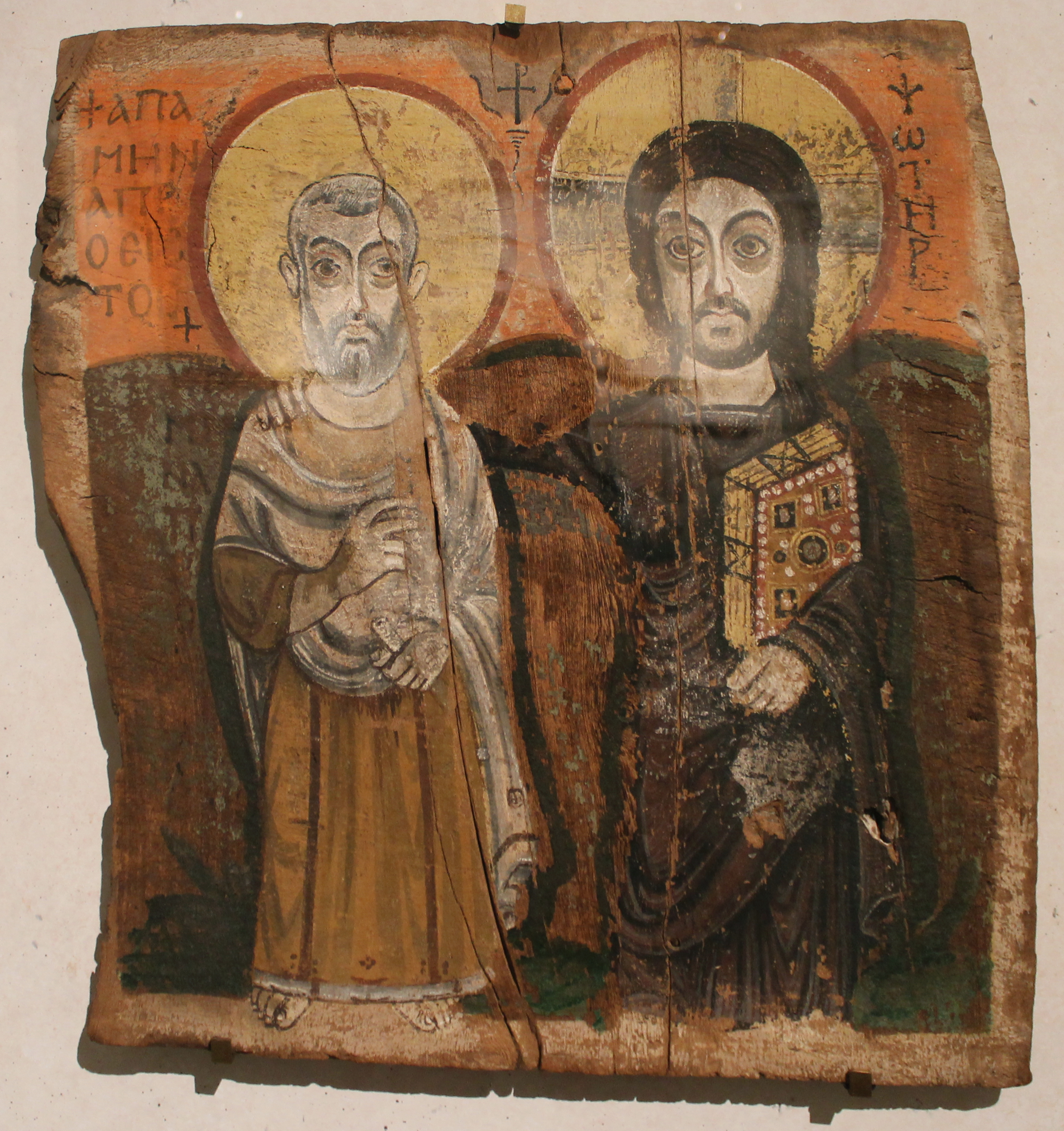
Christ and Saint Menas.
(6th-century Coptic icon, Louvre).

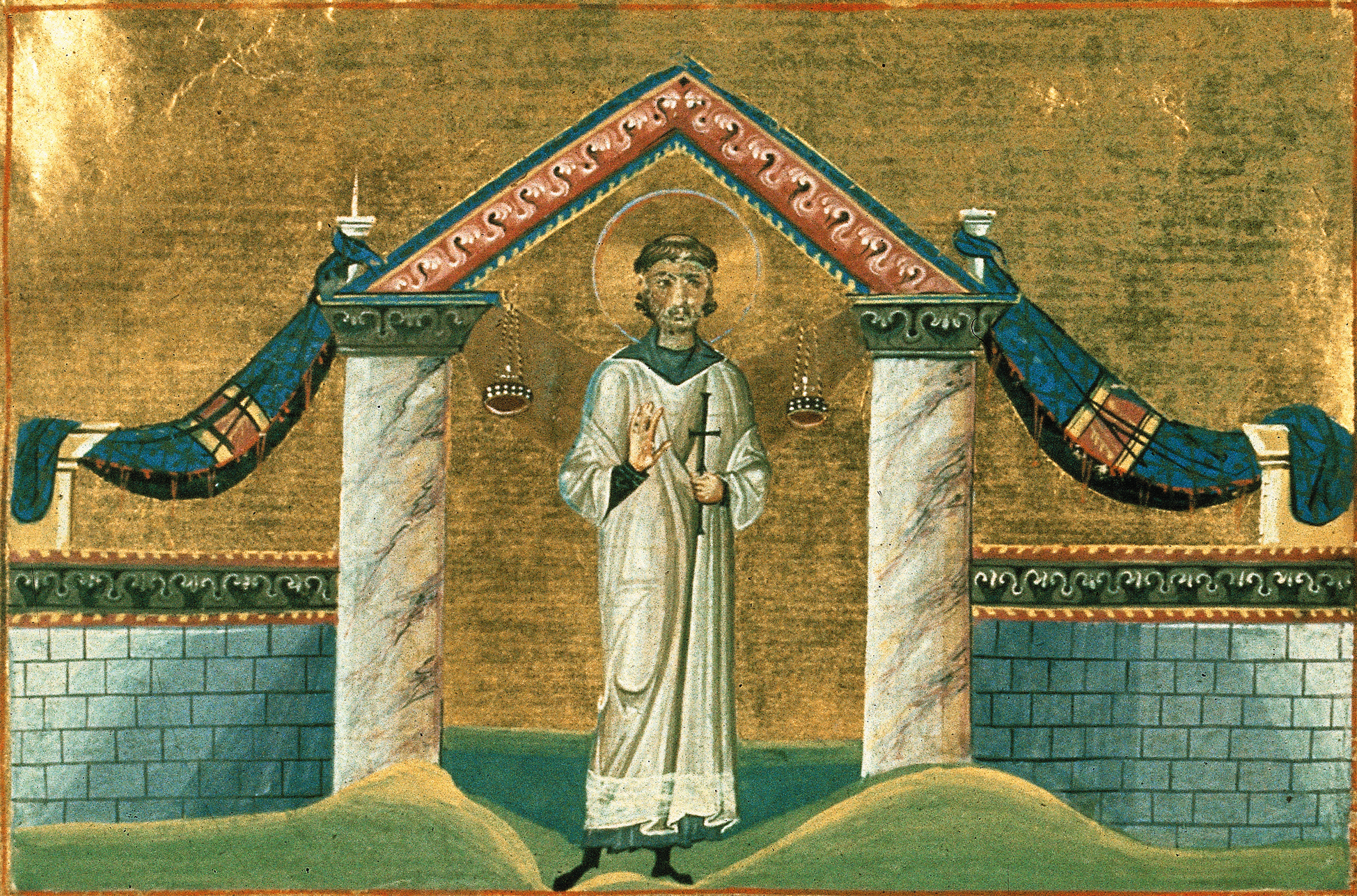
Martyr Vincent of Spain
(Vincent of Saragossa).
(Menologion of Basil II, 10th century).

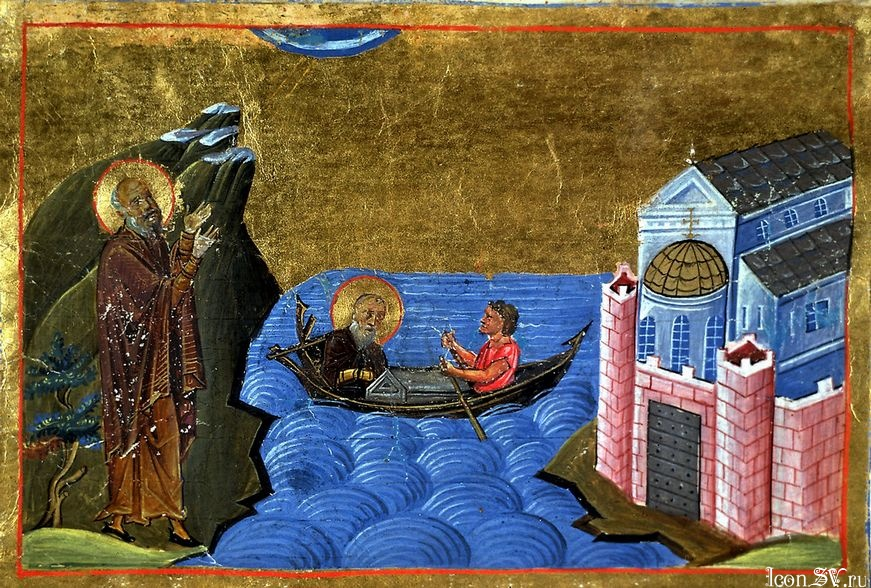
St. Theodore of Studion.
(Menologion of Basil II, 10th century).

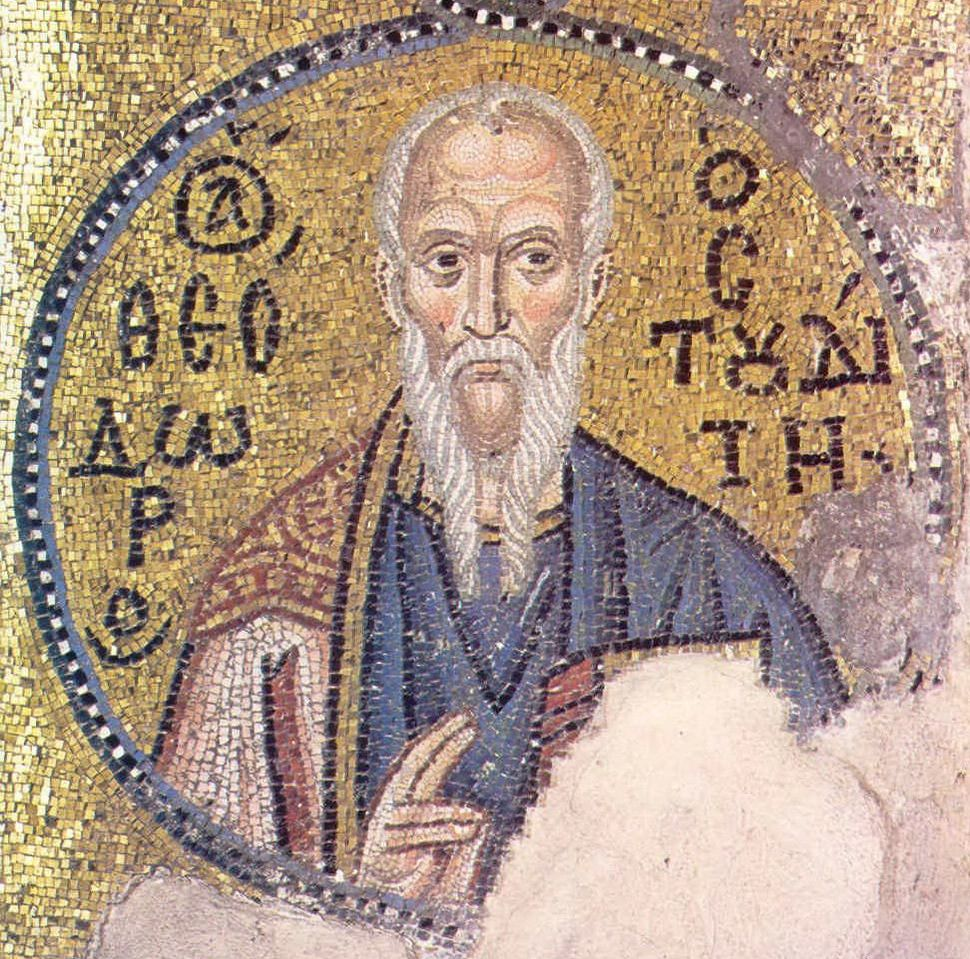
St. Theodore of Studion.

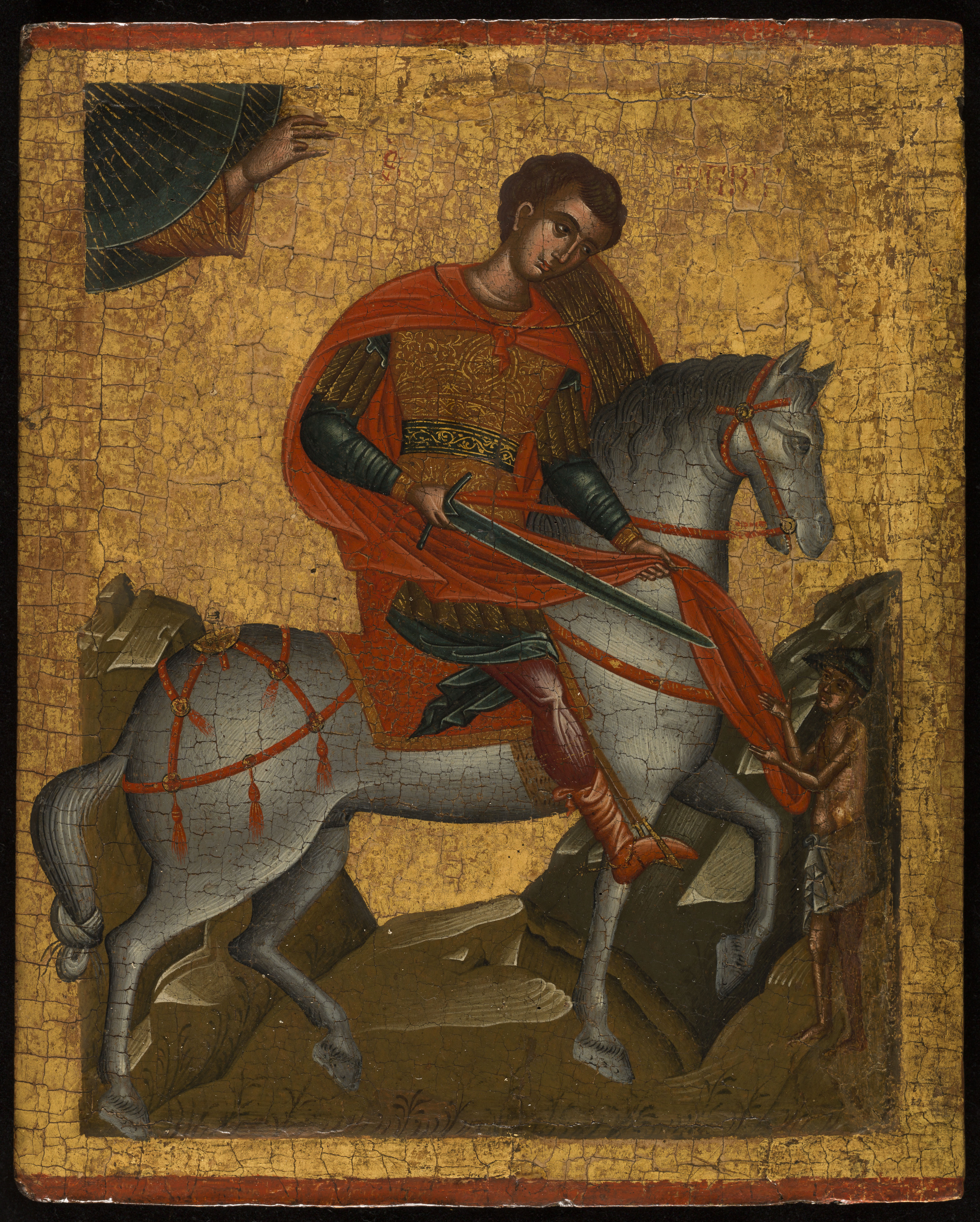
St. Martin the Merciful (Martin of Tours).

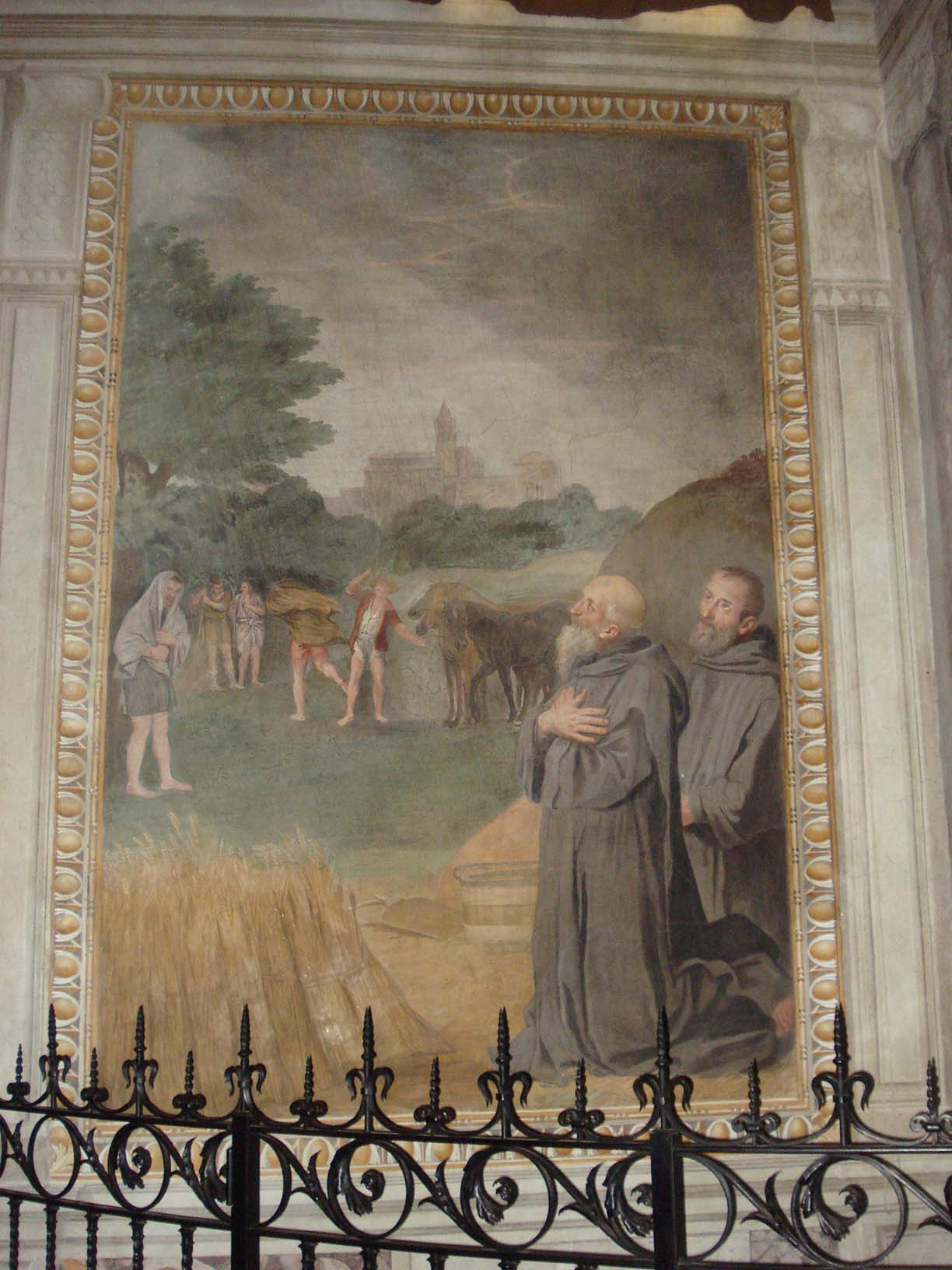
St. Bartholomew the Younger's Miracle of Harvest.

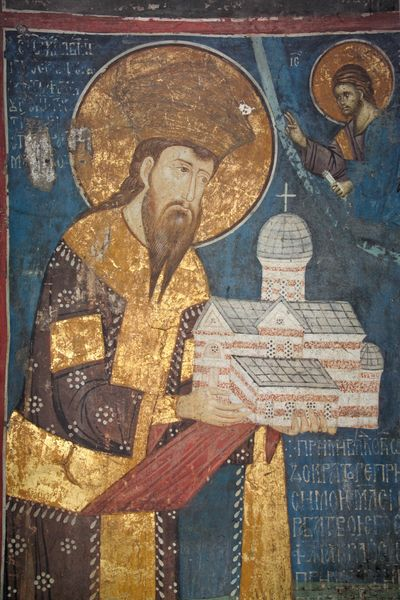
Great-martyr Stephen-Urosh III of Decani.

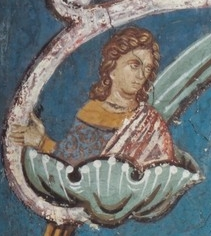
St. Stephen Urosica, of Serbia.

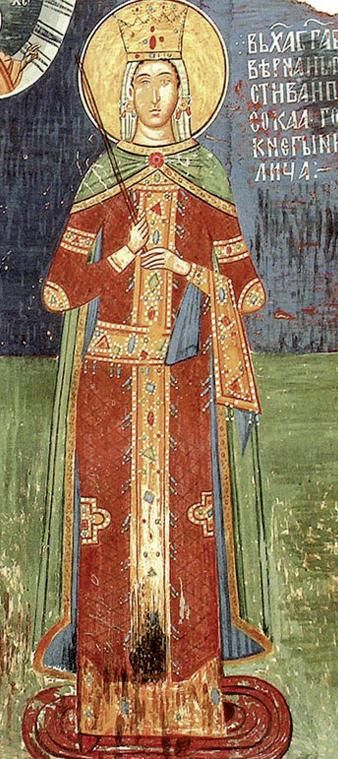
St. Milica of Serbia, Princess of Serbia (Eugenia in schema).

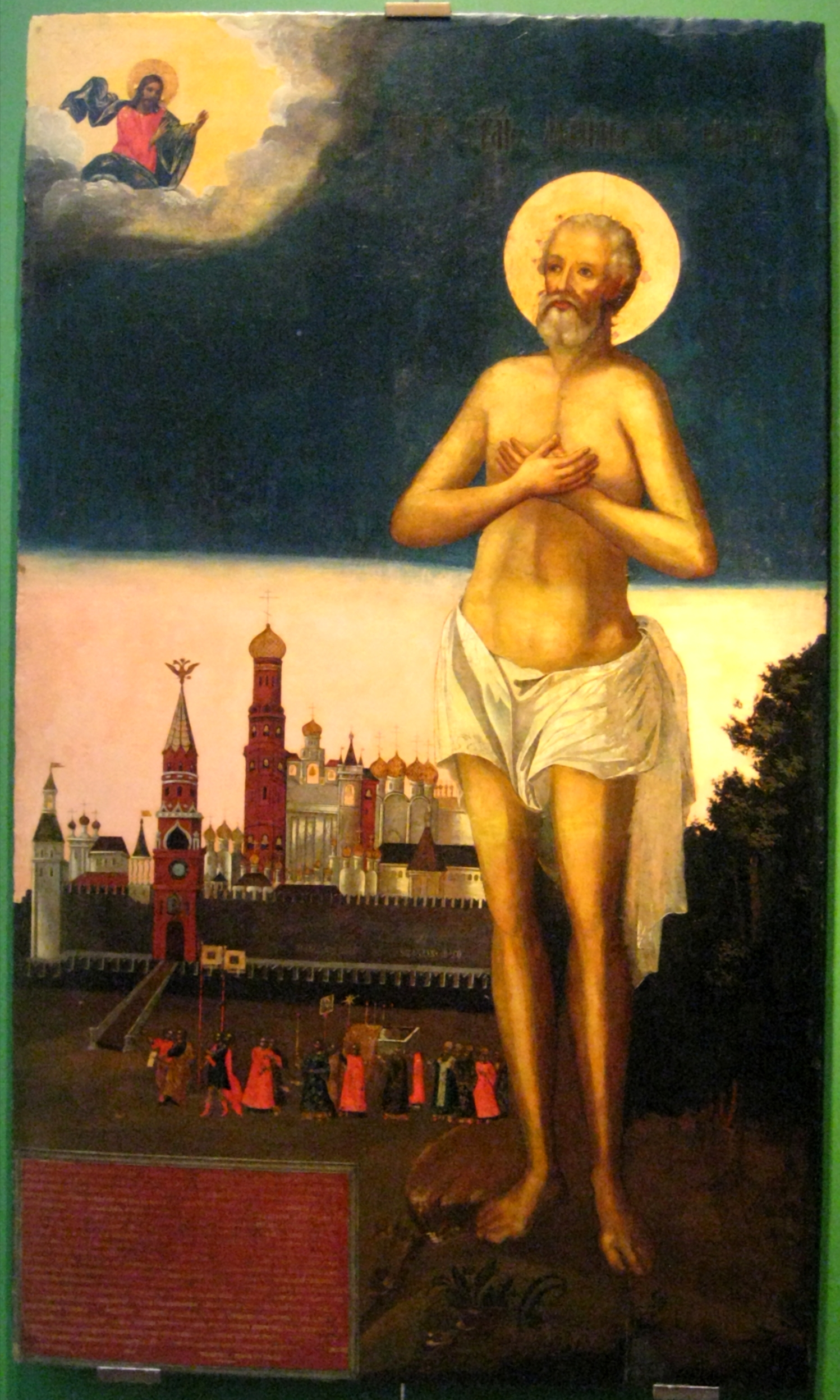
Blessed Maxym of Moscow, Fool-for-Christ.

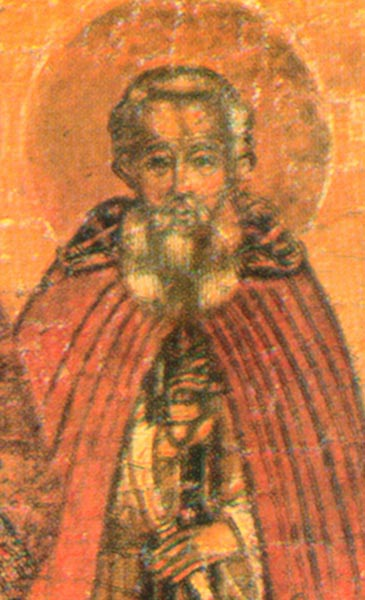
St. Martyrius, founder of Zelenets Monastery, Novgorod.

Archbishop Victor Sadkovsky, Archbishop of Chernigov.

Metropolitan Platon (Levshin) of Moscow.

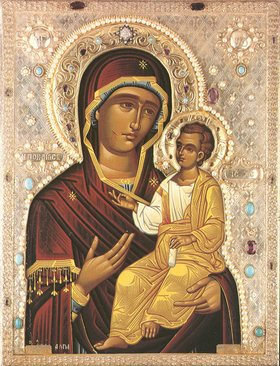
"Montreal" Iveron Icon of the Theotokos.

== Sources ==
- November 11/November 24. Orthodox Calendar (PRAVOSLAVIE.RU).
- November 24 / November 11. HOLY TRINITY RUSSIAN ORTHODOX CHURCH (A parish of the Patriarchate of Moscow).
- November 11. OCA - The Lives of the Saints.
- The Autonomous Orthodox Metropolia of Western Europe and the Americas (ROCOR). St. Hilarion Calendar of Saints for the year of our Lord 2004. St. Hilarion Press (Austin, TX). p. 84.
- The Eleventh Day of the Month of November. Orthodoxy in China.
- November 11. Latin Saints of the Orthodox Patriarchate of Rome.
- The Roman Martyrology. Transl. by the Archbishop of Baltimore. Last Edition, According to the Copy Printed at Rome in 1914. Revised Edition, with the Imprimatur of His Eminence Cardinal Gibbons. Baltimore: John Murphy Company, 1916. pp. 347–348.
- Rev. Richard Stanton. A Menology of England and Wales, or, Brief Memorials of the Ancient British and English Saints Arranged According to the Calendar, Together with the Martyrs of the 16th and 17th Centuries. London: Burns & Oates, 1892. pp. 534–535.

Greek Sources

- Great Synaxaristes: (in Greek) 11 ΝΟΕΜΒΡΙΟΥ. ΜΕΓΑΣ ΣΥΝΑΞΑΡΙΣΤΗΣ.
- (in Greek) Συναξαριστής. 11 Νοεμβρίου. ECCLESIA.GR. (H ΕΚΚΛΗΣΙΑ ΤΗΣ ΕΛΛΑΔΟΣ).
- (in Greek) November 11. Ορθόδοξος Συναξαριστής.

Russian Sources

- (in Russian) 24 ноября (11 ноября). Православная Энциклопедия под редакцией Патриарха Московского и всея Руси Кирилла (электронная версия). (Orthodox Encyclopedia - Pravenc.ru).
- (in Russian) 11 ноября по старому стилю / 24 ноября по новому стилю. Русская Православная Церковь - Православный церковный календарь на 2016 год.
