= November 12 (Eastern Orthodox liturgics) =

Day in the Eastern Orthodox liturgical calendar

Eastern Orthodox liturgical calendar
November 11	November 12	November 13
November 12 O.S. ≍ November 25 N.S. November 12 N.S ≍ October 30 O.S.

An Eastern Orthodox cross

November 12 in Eastern Orthodox liturgical calendars is a feast day and a day of commemoration of saints and martyrs. Although some Orthodox churches use the Revised Julian Calendar and others use the traditional Julian calendar, the fixed commemorations for their respective November 12 are broadly the same, no matter which calendar is used. (Note: Despite the dates being the same, the days to which they refer typically differ by 13 days. The notation Old Style or O.S. is sometimes used to indicate a date in the traditional Julian Calendar (the "Old Calendar"). The notation New Style or N.S. indicates a date in the Revised Julian calendar (the "New Calendar").)

== Saints ==
- Prophet Ahijah the Shilonite (Achias) (960 BC) (Note: "The Holy Prophet Ahijah, (cf. 1/3 Kgs 11:29 ff.) was a contemporary of Solomon, and was born in the city of Shiloh. The prophet predicted to Jeroboam his kingly rule over the ten Tribes of Israel, which God would grant him, snatching them away from the hands of Solomon. Afterwards Ahijah predicted to Jeroboam the perishing of all his line. All the predictions of the prophet were fulfilled. The Prophet Ahijah died in old age 960 years before the birth of Christ.")
- Martyr Arsacius (Arsakios), by the sword.
- Martyrs Anthony, Zevinus, Germanus, Nicephorus and virgin-martyr Maratho, under Diocletian (c. 286–305) (Note: The martyrs Anthony, Zevinus, Germanus and Nicephorus were beheaded in Caesarea, while Virgin-martyr Maratho was burned alive in Scythopolis in Syria Palaestina.) (see also: November 13)
- Saint Martin of Terracina, Bishop of Terracina (c. 4th century) (Note: He was a renowned Illyrian from Savaria in Pannonia, pious and virtuous. For defending Orthodoxy, the Arians publicly abused him and exiled him from the city. Therefore he fled to Milan, in Italy, but he suffered there as well, by the Arian bishop of that city, named Auxentius. He was then forced to retire to the island of Galerian in the Tyrrhenian Sea, which was entirely deserted. He sustained himself by eating the vegetation there. Later, he became the Bishop of Terracina, and excelled in his ecclesiastical duties. He nourished the poor, defended the aggrieved, and righteously pastored the flock entrusted to him. He reposed peacefully.) (see also: November 10)
- Venerable Martin the Merciful (Martin of Tours), Bishop of Tours (397) (see also: October 12, November 11, July 4)
- Venerable Nilus the Faster, of Sinai (451) (Note: "At Constantinople, St. Nilus, abbot who resigned the office of governor of the city to become a monk, and was distinguished for learning and sanctity, in the time of Theodosius the Younger.")
- Saint John the Merciful, Patriarch of Alexandria (c. 616–620)

== Pre-Schism Western saints ==
- Saint Rufus of Avignon, venerated as the first Bishop of Avignon in France (c. 200)
- Saint Renatus (René), Bishop of Angers in France, and by tradition of Sorrento in the south of Italy (c. 422)
- Saint Evodius, Bishop of Le Puy in France (c. 560)
- Saint Emilian of Cogolla, Hermit, of Vergegio in Spain (574) (Note: A poor shepherd in La Rioja in Spain, he became a hermit and was later ordained priest for the parish of Berceo. The saint, however, returned to his life as a hermit. A large number of disciples gathered around him and he became their abbot. This gave rise to the monastery of La Cogolla. In Spain he is known as San Millan de la Cogolla.) (Note: "At Tarazona, in Spain, blessed Æmilian, a priest who wrought numberless miracles, and whose wonderful life was written by St. Braulio, bishop of Saragossa.")
- Saint Machar (Macharius, Mochumna), Bishop of Aberdeen (6th century) (Note: Born in Ireland, he was baptised by St Colman and became a disciple of St Columba at Iona in Scotland. Later he went with twelve disciples to convert the Picts near Aberdeen.)
- Saint Sinnell of Cleenish (Senilis), Ireland (6th century)
- Saint Himerius (Imier), a hermit in the Jura in Switzerland, now called after him Immertal, Val-Saint-Imier (c. 610)
- Saint Cummian Fada (Cumianus), a monk at Clonfert, who founded the monastery of Kilcummin (662)
- Saint Cunibert, Bishop of Cologne in Germany, an untiring builder of churches and monasteries (c. 663)
- Saint Cadwaladr (Catuvelladurus), King of the Welsh (664) (Note: "ST. CADWALADOR, called the last King of Britain, of the ancient British race, was the son of the ferocious Cadwallon, who fell in the Battle of Heavenfield, in an encounter with St. Oswald. Cadwalador was venerated as a Saint in Wales, and is named in the calendars of that country. Of his Acts we know little or nothing; but it appears that either he died of the plague in Wales, or, flying from the terrible epidemic, died in Brittany. (The story of his abdicating and going to Rome and dying there, appears to arise from a confusion between Cadwalador and Ceadwalla, King of Wessex).")
- Saint Paternus, born in Brittany, he was a monk at Cessier and then at Saint-Pierre-le-Vif near Sens in France, murdered by evildoers (c. 726)
- Saint Lebuinus (Liafwine, Leafwine), Apostle of the Frisians and patron of Deventer (c. 773) (Note: A monk at Ripon in England, he went to Holland and took part in the work begun by St Boniface. He worked with St Marcellinus under St Gregory of Utrecht and founded a church in Deventer. From there he preached to the Saxons and the Frisians.)
- Saint Namphasius (Namphrase), a hermit near Marcillac in France, after a military career (c. 800)
- Saint Ymar, a monk at the monastery of Reculver in Kent in England, martyred by the Danes (c. 830)
- Saints Benedict, John, Matthew, Isaac and Christinus (Christian), monks from Italy who followed St Adalbert of Prague, murdered at their monastery near Gnesen, Poland (1005) (Note: "In Poland, the holy martyrs Benedict, John, Matthew, Isaac and Christinus, hermits.")
- Saint Astericus of Pannonhalma (Astricus, Ascrick), first Abbot of Břevnov Monastery, then first Abbot of Pannonhalma, and Archbishop of Kalocsa (c. 1035)

== Post-Schism Orthodox saints ==
- Saint Leontius (Leo), Patriarch of Constantinople (1143)
- Blessed John "the Hairy", Fool-for-Christ, of Rostov (1580)
- Venerable Nilus the Myrrh-gusher, of Mount Athos (1651)

=== New martyrs and confessors ===
- New Martyr Mark Peter Markoulis of Kleisoura (1598)
- New Martyr Sabbas Nigdelis the Samoladan, beheaded at Koutzouk-Karamani, Constantinople, buried in Eğri Kapı ("Crooked Gate") (1726)
- New Martyr Nicholas of Six Marmara, at Constantinople (1732)
- New Martyrs and Confessors of Năsăud, Romania (1763):

- Athanasius Todoran, Basil Dumitru, Gregory Manu, and Basil Oichi

- New Hieromartyr Alexander Adrianov, priest of the Ekaterinburg Diocese (1918) (Note: "Fr. Alexander Adrianov was a zealous priest of the Ekaterinburg Diocese whose whole life was consumed by service to his flock and love for others. In the autumn of 1918, Fr. Alexander was the sole priest remaining in his area, as several others fled following the Bolsheviks’ killing of several clergy. He continued zealously serving and preaching. Fr. Alexander was arrested in the night of November 8/21 during a Divine service and was shot soon thereafter on November 12/25. According to one eyewitness, Fr. Alexander died with a prayer on his lips. His body was found five days later, lightly covered with snow, with his arms crossed over his chest.")
- New Hieromartyrs Constantine Uspensky, Vladimir Krasnovsky, Alexander Archangelsky, Matthew Aloin and Demetrius Rozanov, Priests (1937)
- New Hieromartyr Boris (1942)
- New Hieor-Confessor Varnava Nastić, Bishop of Hvosno (1964) (see also: October 30 - O.S.)

== Other commemorations ==
- Icon of the Mother of God "Kykkiotissa" ("The Merciful", "Milostivaya"), from Kykkos Monastery on Cyprus. (see also: December 26)
- Commemoration of the miracle (1718) of Saint Spyridon the Wonderworker (348), when the Latins wanted to place their own altar in his church on Corfu.
- Repose of Righteous Cosmas of Birsk (1882)
- Commemoration of the righteous monks and laymen buried at Optina Monastery, including:

- Virgin maiden Barbara (1900);
- Hieromonk Basil; Riassaphore-monks Trophimus and Therapontus (1993);
- the youth George (1994)

== Icon gallery ==
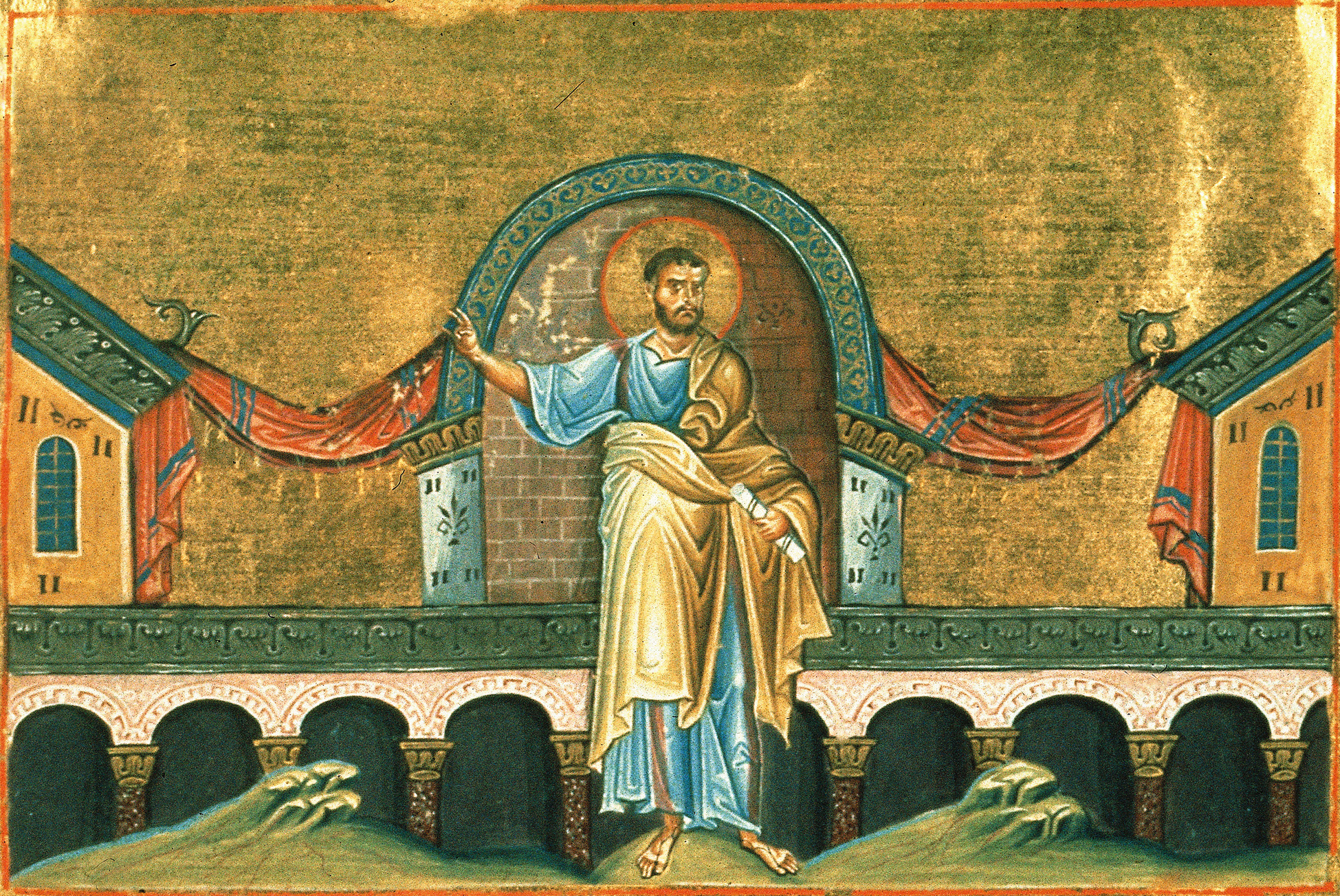
Prophet Ahijah the Shilonite.
(Menologion of Basil II, 10th century).

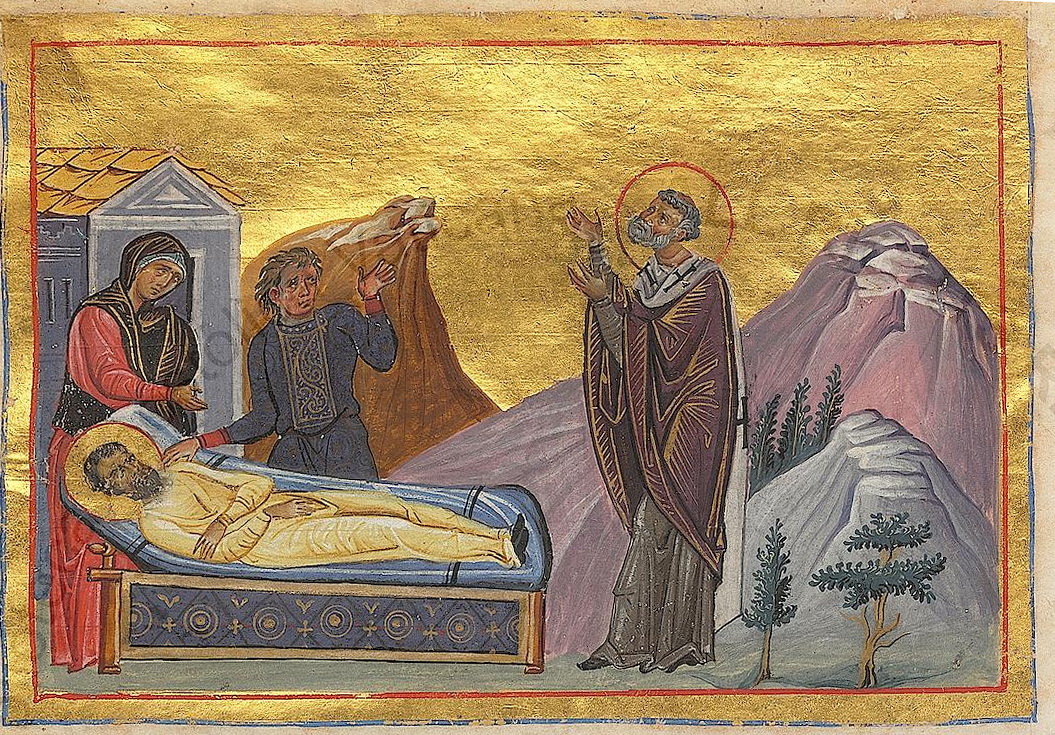
St. Martin the Merciful (Martin of Tours), Bishop of Tours.
(Menologion of Basil II, 10th century).

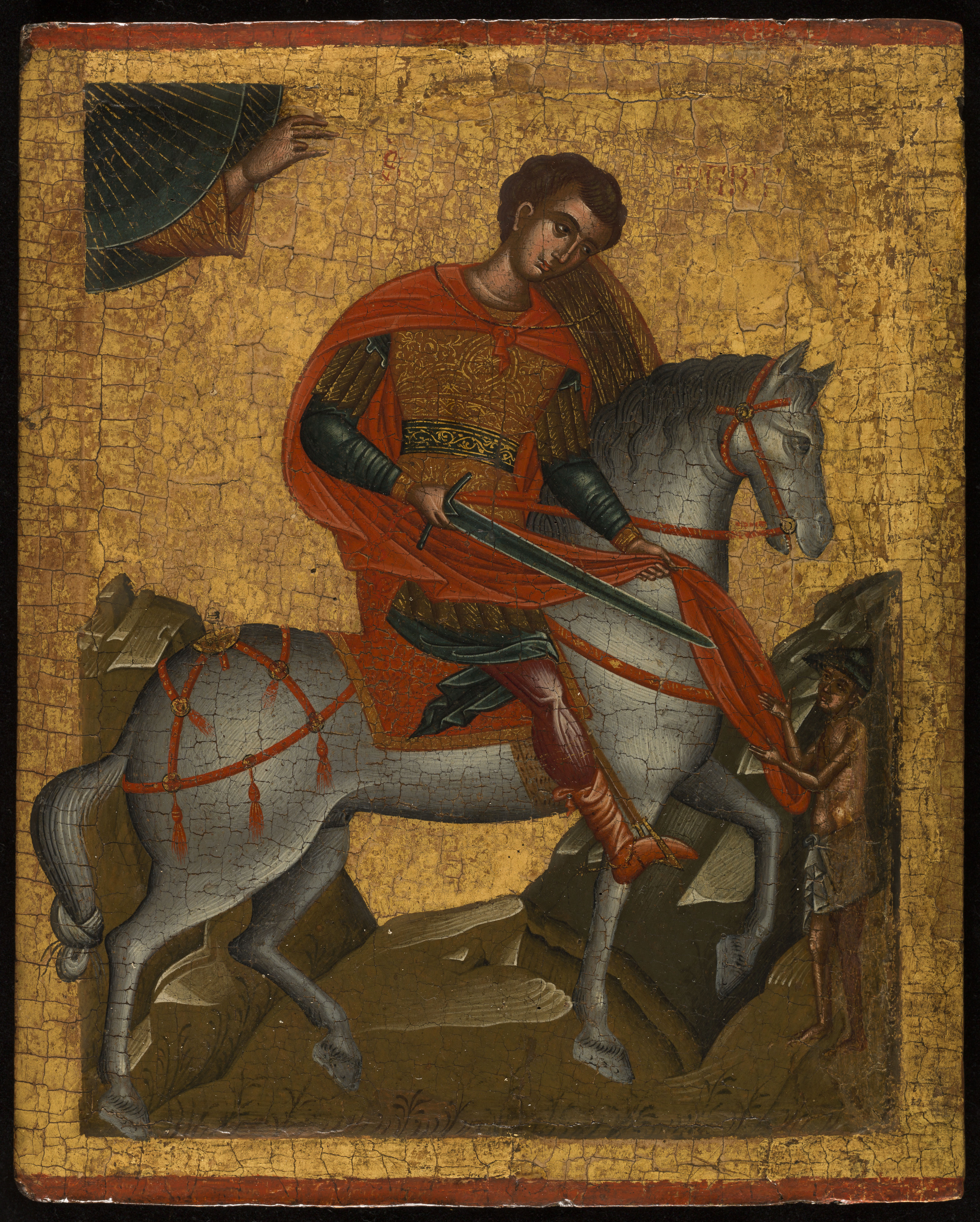
St. Martin the Merciful (Martin of Tours).

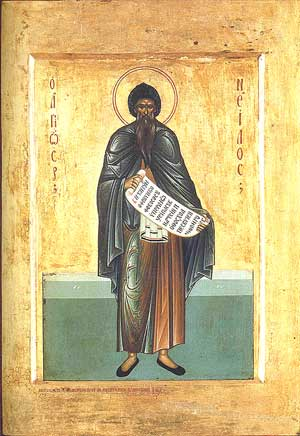
Venerable Nilus the Faster, of Sinai.

St. John the Merciful, Patriarch of Alexandria.
(Menologion of Basil II, 10th century).

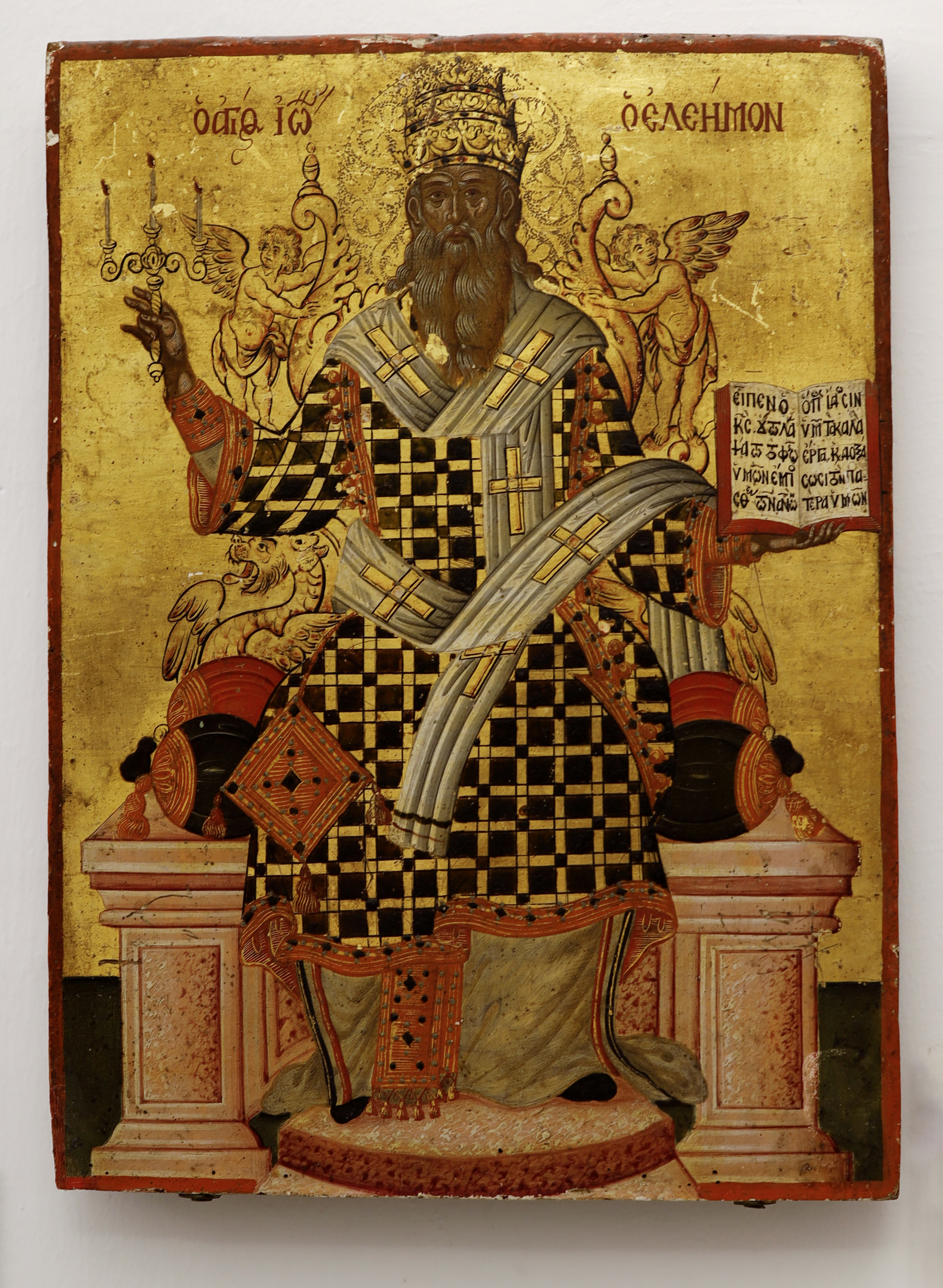
St. John the Merciful, Patriarch of Alexandria.
(By an unknown Cretan-Venetian painter, 17th century).

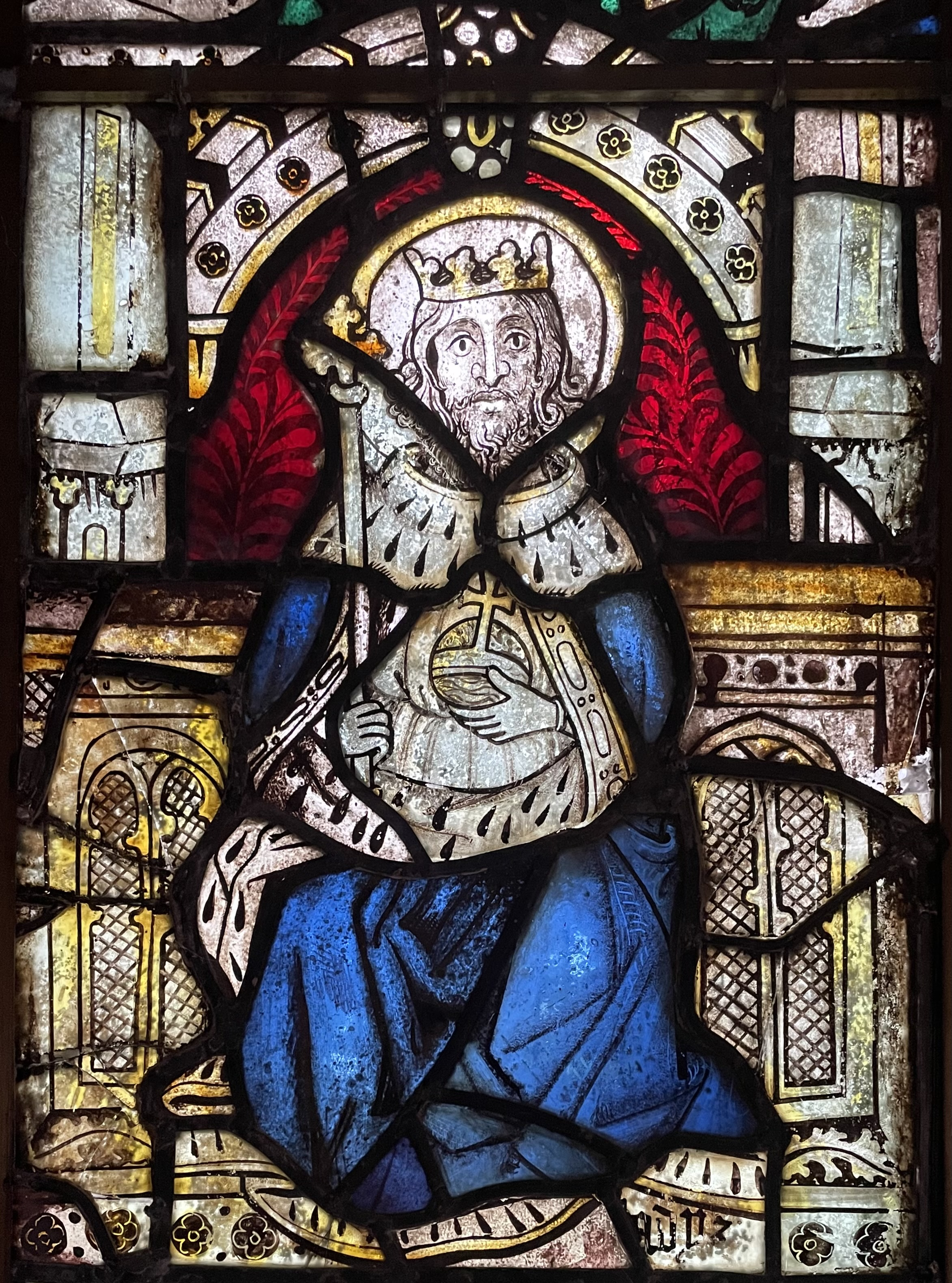
St. Cadwaladr (Catuvelladurus), King of the Welsh.

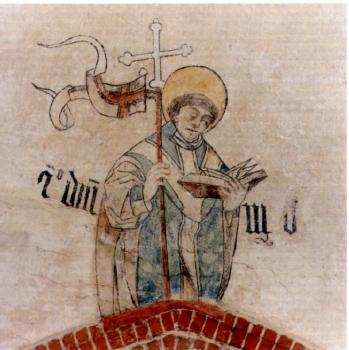
St. Lebuinus (Liafwine, Leafwine), Apostle of the Frisians.

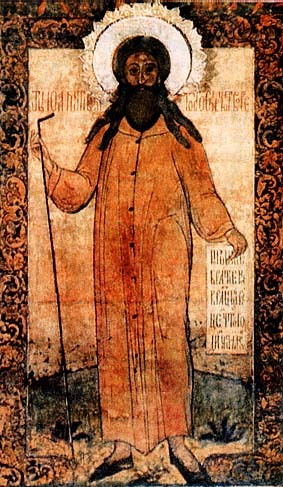
Blessed John "the Hairy", Fool-for-Christ, of Rostov.

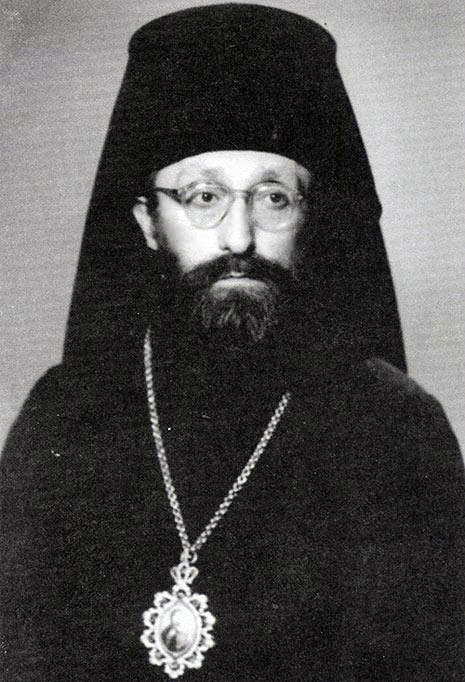
New Hiero-Confessor Varnava Nastić of Bosnia, Bishop of Hvosno.

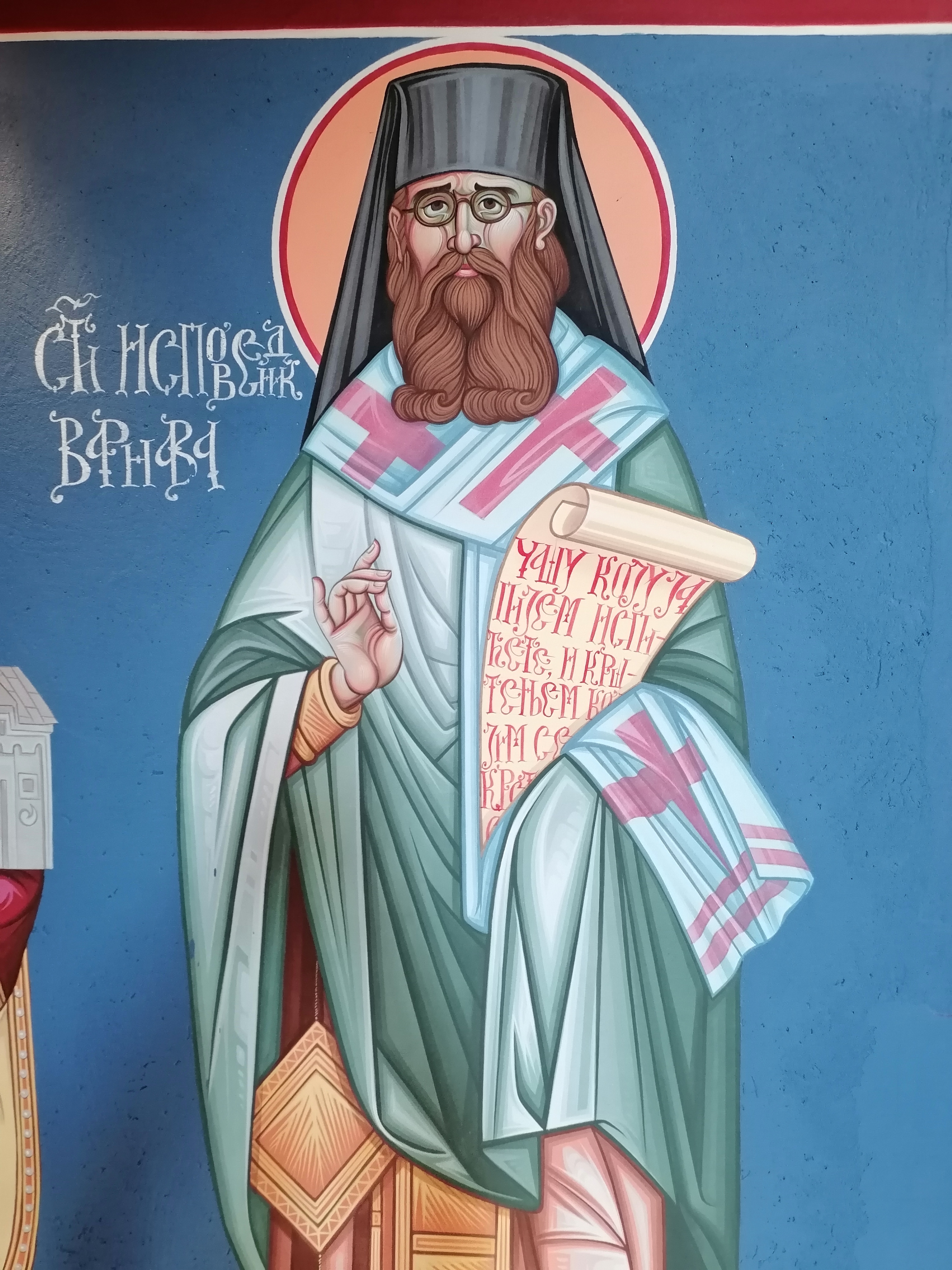
New Hiero-Confessor Varnava Nastić, Bishop of Hvosno.

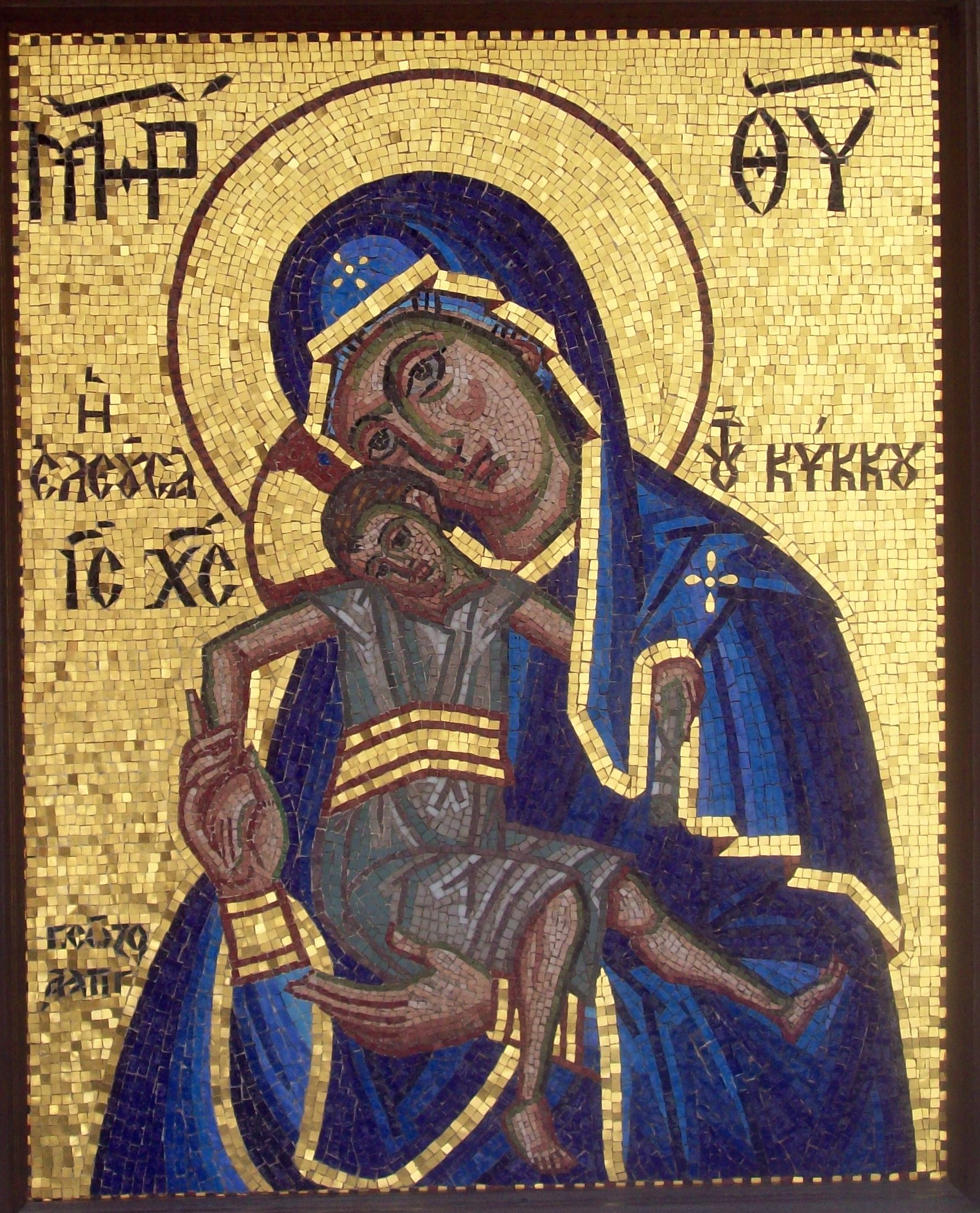
Icon of the Mother of God "Merciful".
(Mosaic icon from Kykkos Monastery, Cyprus).

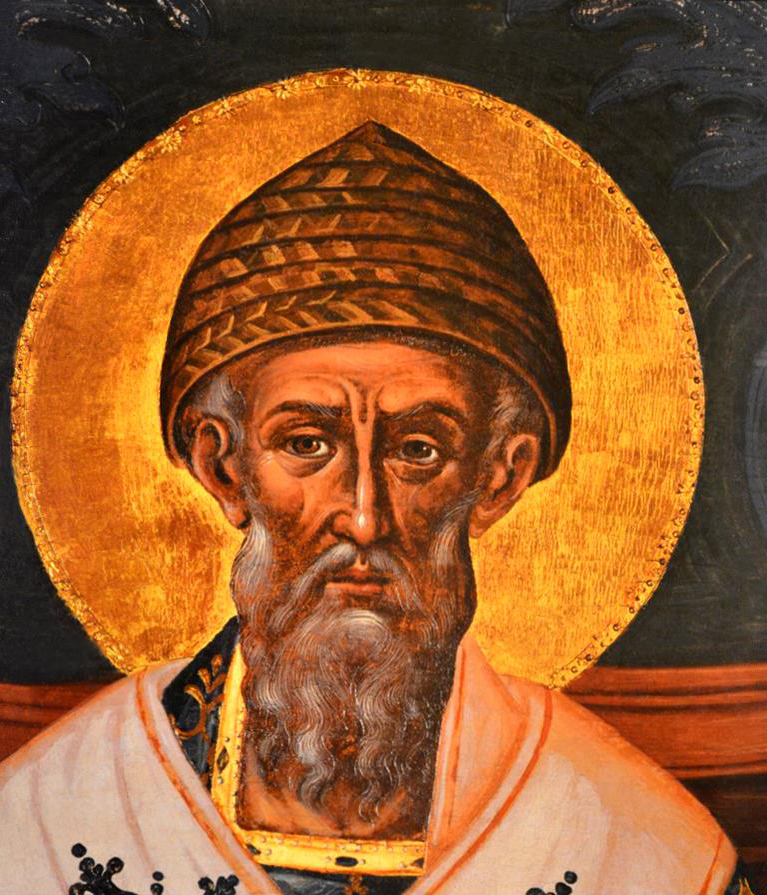
St. Spyridon the Wonderworker.

== Sources ==
- November 12/November 25. Orthodox Calendar (PRAVOSLAVIE.RU).
- November 25 / November 12. HOLY TRINITY RUSSIAN ORTHODOX CHURCH (A parish of the Patriarchate of Moscow).
- November 12. OCA - The Lives of the Saints.
- The Autonomous Orthodox Metropolia of Western Europe and the Americas (ROCOR). St. Hilarion Calendar of Saints for the year of our Lord 2004. St. Hilarion Press (Austin, TX). pp. 84–85.
- The Twelfth Day of the Month of November. Orthodoxy in China.
- November 12. Latin Saints of the Orthodox Patriarchate of Rome.
- The Roman Martyrology. Transl. by the Archbishop of Baltimore. Last Edition, According to the Copy Printed at Rome in 1914. Revised Edition, with the Imprimatur of His Eminence Cardinal Gibbons. Baltimore: John Murphy Company, 1916. pp. 349–350.
- Rev. Richard Stanton. A Menology of England and Wales, or, Brief Memorials of the Ancient British and English Saints Arranged According to the Calendar, Together with the Martyrs of the 16th and 17th Centuries. London: Burns & Oates, 1892. pp. 535–537.

Greek Sources

- Great Synaxaristes: (in Greek) 12 ΝΟΕΜΒΡΙΟΥ. ΜΕΓΑΣ ΣΥΝΑΞΑΡΙΣΤΗΣ.
- (in Greek) Συναξαριστής. 12 Νοεμβρίου. ECCLESIA.GR. (H ΕΚΚΛΗΣΙΑ ΤΗΣ ΕΛΛΑΔΟΣ).
- (in Greek) November 12. Ορθόδοξος Συναξαριστής.

Russian Sources

- (in Russian) 25 ноября (12 ноября). Православная Энциклопедия под редакцией Патриарха Московского и всея Руси Кирилла (электронная версия). (Orthodox Encyclopedia - Pravenc.ru).
- (in Russian) 12 ноября по старому стилю / 25 ноября по новому стилю. Русская Православная Церковь - Православный церковный календарь на 2016 год.
