= November 13 (Eastern Orthodox liturgics) =

Day in the Eastern Orthodox liturgical calendar

Eastern Orthodox liturgical calendar
| November 12 | November 13 | November 14 |
November 13 O.S. ≍ November 26 N.S. November 13 N.S ≍ October 31 O.S.

An Eastern Orthodox cross

November 13 in Eastern Orthodox liturgical calendars is a feast day and a day of commemoration of saints and martyrs. Although some Orthodox churches use the Revised Julian Calendar and others use the traditional Julian calendar, the fixed commemorations for their respective November 13 are broadly the same, no matter which calendar is used. (Note: Despite the dates being the same, the days to which they refer typically differ by 13 days. The notation Old Style or O.S. is sometimes used to indicate a date in the traditional Julian Calendar (the "Old Calendar"). The notation New Style or N.S. indicates a date in the Revised Julian calendar (the "New Calendar").)

== Saints ==
- Martyrs Antoninus, Nicephorus (Nikephoros), Germanus, and Manetha, of Caesarea in Palestine (c. 308) (Note: "At Caesarea, in Palestine, the martyrdom of the Saints Antoninus, Zebina, Germanus and Ennatha, virgin. Ennatha was scourged under Galerius Maximian, and burned alive, while the others, for boldly reproaching the governor Firmilian for his idolatry in sacrificing to the gods, were beheaded.") (see also: November 12)
- Saint Anthusa, the mother of Saint John Chrysostom (4th century) (Note: "Her commemoration was instituted in 1998 by the Ecumenical Patriarch Bartholomew I.")
- Saint John Chrysostom (the "Golden-Mouthed"), Archbishop of Constantinople (407) (Note: Name days celebrated today include: Chrysostomos (Χρυσόστομος).)
- Saint Hilarion the Iberian (882) (see also: November 19)

== Pre-Schism Western saints ==
- Saints Valentine, Solutor and Victor, martyrs venerated in Ravenna in Italy (305) (Note: "At Ravenna, the birthday of the holy martyrs Valentine, Solutor and Victor, who suffered under the emperor Diocletian.") (see also: November 11)
- Saint Matrius (Mitrius, Mitre, Metre, Merre), a Greek slave that was abused and beheaded (314) (Note: A Greek slave belonging to a tyrannical master in Aix in Provence in France. He was savagely abused by his master and his fellow-slaves and was finally beheaded.) (Note: "At Aix, in Province, St. Matrius, a most renowned martyr.")
- Saint Damasus, Pope of Rome (384) (Note: Born in Spain, he served as deacon in the Spanish church of St Laurence in Rome. He became Pope of Rome in 366, opposed Arianism and Apollinarianism, developed the liturgy and restored many churches and tombs of the martyrs.)
- Saints Arcadius, Paschasius, Probus, Eutychian and Paulillus, Protomartyrs of the Vandal persecution (437) (Note: All of these were born in Spain and exiled to Africa by the Vandal Arian King Genseric, where they became the Protomartyrs of the Vandal persecution. Paulillus was only a boy, the little brother of Sts Paschasius and Eutychian.) (Note: "In Africa, the holy martyrs Arcadius, Paschasius, Probus and Eutychian, Spaniards, who refused absolutely to yield to the Arian perfidy, during the persecution of the Vandals. Accordingly they were proscribed by the Arian king Genseric, driven into exile, and finally, after being subjected to fearful tortures, were put to death in various manners. Then was also made manifest the constancy of the small boy Paulillus, brother of the Saints Paschasius and Eutychian. As he could not be seduced from the Catholic faith, he was a long time beaten with rods, and condemned to a base servitude.")
- Saint Bricius (Brice, Britius, Brixius), Bishop of Tours (444) (Note: A disciple of St Martin of Tours in France, in fact he was proud and ambitious. Chosen to be St Martin's successor at Tours, he was eventually driven out. He repented and was reinstated. Such was the change in him that his flock proclaimed him a saint immediately after his death.) (Note: "At Tours, St. Brice, bishop, disciple of the blessed bishop Martin.")
- Saint Euphrasius (Eufrèse), Bishop of Clermont, Gaul (515)
- Saint Leonien (Leonardo, Leoniano, Leonianus, Leonine, Leoninus, Lezin) of Vienne, Gaul (518)
- Saint Quintianus (Quintian), Bishop of Clermont, Gaul (525) (Note: Born in North Africa, he fled to France to escape the Arian-Vandal persecution. Eventually he became Bishop of Rodez, but was exiled by the Arian Visigoths. He went to Auvergne where he succeeded St Euphrasius as Bishop of Clermont.)
- Saint Dalmatius of Rodez, Bishop of Rodez (580) (Note: Bishop of Rodez in France from 524 to 580. He suffered greatly at the hands of the Arian King Amalric.)
- Saint Devinicus (Denick, Teavneck), worked with Sts Columba and Machar and preached in Caithness, probably as a bishop (6th century)
- Saint Columba the Virgin, a virgin-martyr in Cornwall, where she is the patroness-saint of two parishes.
- Saint Eugenius II of Toledo, Bishop of Toledo (657) (Note: A Spanish Goth, born in Toledo in Spain. He became a monk at St Engracia in Saragossa. Finally, in 646, he became Bishop of Toledo. He was a gifted poet and musician and zealous for the beauty of the liturgy.)
- Saint Maxellendis, stabbed to death in Caudry near Cambrai in the north of France because she wished to be a nun (c. 670)
- Saint Chillien (Kilian), missionary in Artois in the north of France (7th century) (Note: Born in Ireland and a relative of St Fiacre, he was a missionary in Artois in the north of France. His relics were enshrined in Aubigny near Arras.)
- Saint Gredifael, a saint who accompanied St Paternus from Brittany to Wales, was Abbot of Whitland Abbey in Dyfed (7th century)
- Saint Abbo of Fleury, Abbot of Fleury, martyred in La Réole in Gascony (c. 1004) (Note: Born near Orleans in France, he became a monk at Fleury (St Benoît-sur-Loire). Invited by St Oswald of Worcester to take charge of the monastery of Ramsey in England, he stayed there for two years (985–987) and wrote the Life of St Edmund. He then became Abbot of Fleury 988. He was martyred in La Réole in Gascony.)

== Post-Schism Orthodox saints ==
- New Monk-martyr Damascene of the Great Lavra (Athos) and Constantinople (1681) (Note: Name days celebrated today include: Damaskinos, Damascene (Δαμασκηνός); Damaskini (Δαμασκηνή).)

== Other commemorations ==
- Stockholm Icon of the Mother of God (16th–17th centuries)
- Repose of Archbishop Ioasaph (Skorodumov) of Canada (1955) (Note: See: (in Russian) Иоасаф (Скородумов). Википедии. (Russian Wikipedia).)
- Repose of Monk Juvian the Chronicler, of Valaam Monastery (1957)
- Repose of Schema-Nun Irene Myrtidiotissa of Chios (1960)
- Repose of Archimandrite Constantine (Zaitsev) of Jordanville, New York (1975) (Note: See: (in Russian) Константин (Зайцев). Википедии. (Russian Wikipedia).)

== Icon gallery ==
Martyrs Antoninus, Nicephorus, Germanus and Manetha, of Caesarea in Palestine.
(Menologion of Basil II, 10th century).

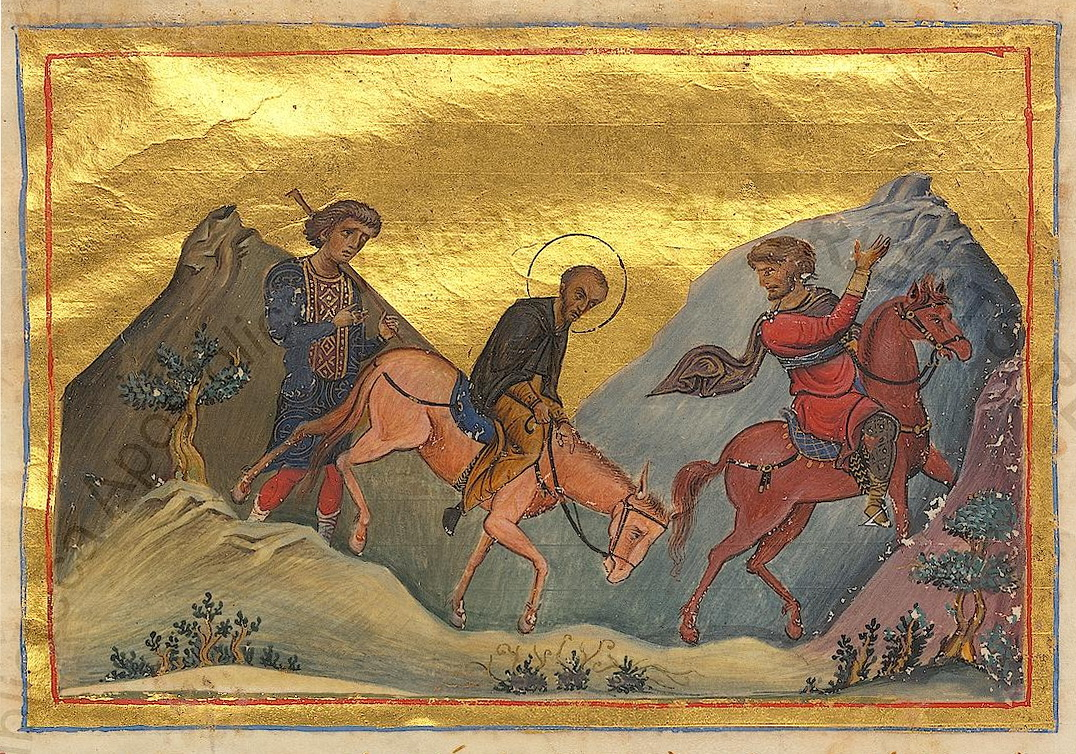
St. John Chrysostom, Archbishop of Constantinople, in exile.
(Menologion of Basil II, 10th century).

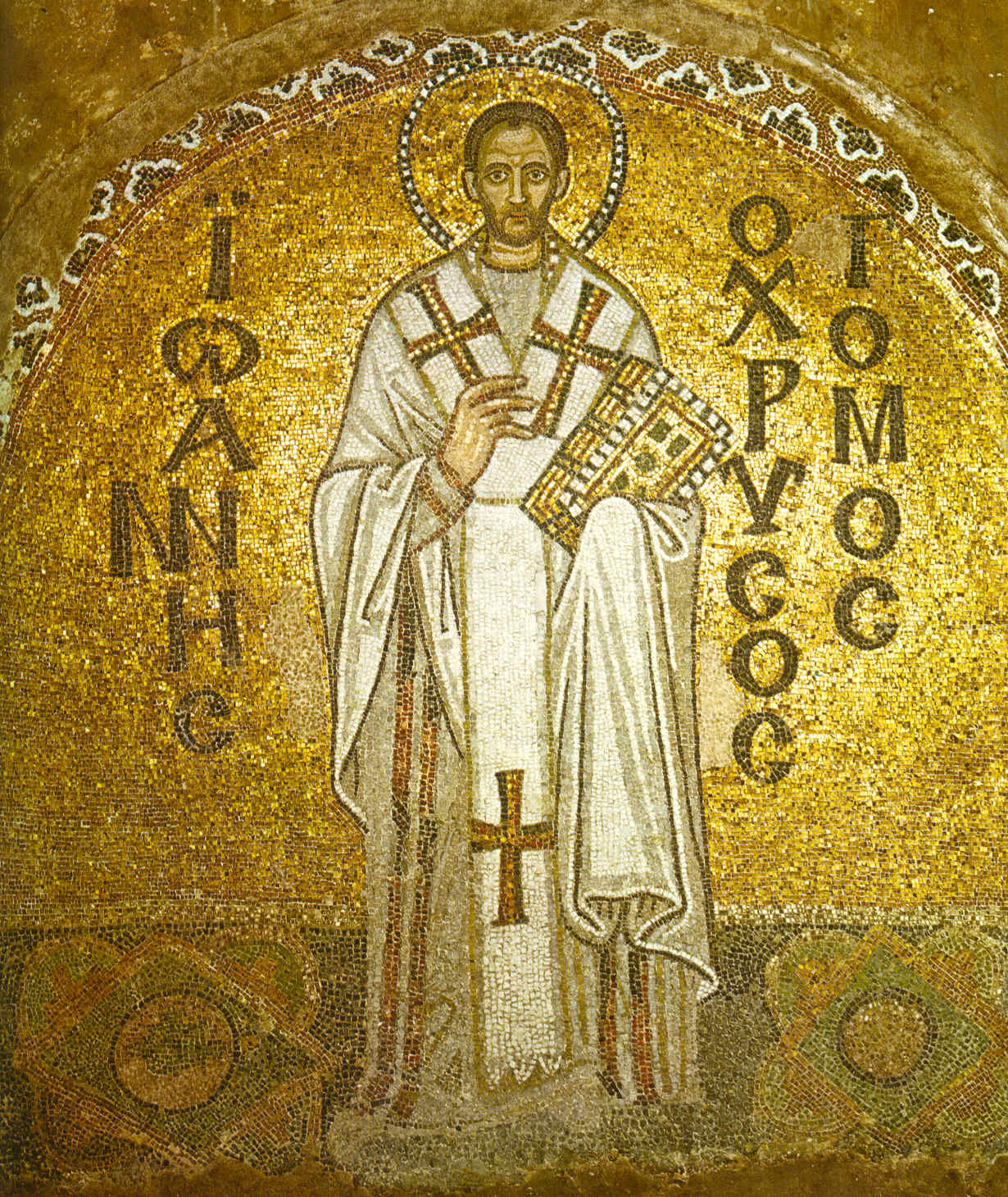
St. John Chrysostom, Archbishop of Constantinople.

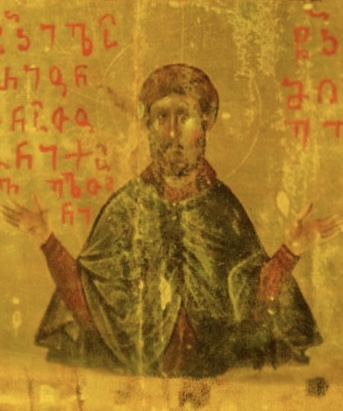
Saint Hilarion the Iberian.
(Detail from icon at Saint Catherine's Monastery).

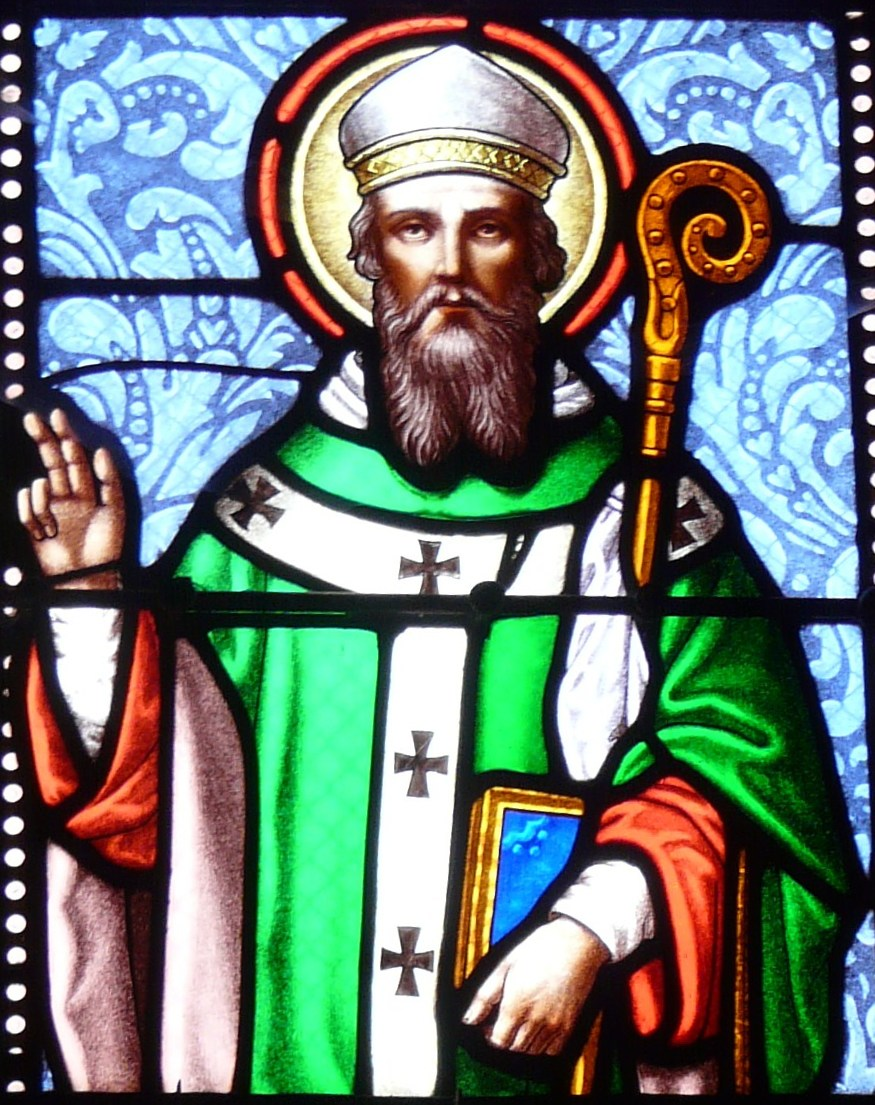
St. Quintianus, Bishop of Clermont, Gaul.

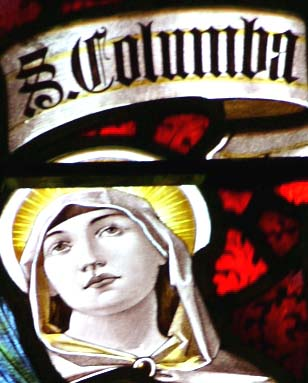
St. Columba the Virgin of Cornwall.

== Sources ==
- November 13/November 26. Orthodox Calendar (PRAVOSLAVIE.RU).
- November 26 / November 13. HOLY TRINITY RUSSIAN ORTHODOX CHURCH (A parish of the Patriarchate of Moscow).
- November 13. OCA - The Lives of the Saints.
- The Autonomous Orthodox Metropolia of Western Europe and the Americas (ROCOR). St. Hilarion Calendar of Saints for the year of our Lord 2004. St. Hilarion Press (Austin, TX). p. 85.
- The Thirteenth Day of the Month of November. Orthodoxy in China.
- November 13. Latin Saints of the Orthodox Patriarchate of Rome.
- The Roman Martyrology. Transl. by the Archbishop of Baltimore. Last Edition, According to the Copy Printed at Rome in 1914. Revised Edition, with the Imprimatur of His Eminence Cardinal Gibbons. Baltimore: John Murphy Company, 1916. pp. 350–351.
- Rev. Richard Stanton. A Menology of England and Wales, or, Brief Memorials of the Ancient British and English Saints Arranged According to the Calendar, Together with the Martyrs of the 16th and 17th Centuries. London: Burns & Oates, 1892. pp. 537–538.

Greek Sources

- Great Synaxaristes: (in Greek) 13 ΝΟΕΜΒΡΙΟΥ. ΜΕΓΑΣ ΣΥΝΑΞΑΡΙΣΤΗΣ.
- (in Greek) Συναξαριστής. 13 Νοεμβρίου. ECCLESIA.GR. (H ΕΚΚΛΗΣΙΑ ΤΗΣ ΕΛΛΑΔΟΣ).
- (in Greek) November 13. Ορθόδοξος Συναξαριστής.

Russian Sources

- (in Russian) 26 ноября (13 ноября). Православная Энциклопедия под редакцией Патриарха Московского и всея Руси Кирилла (электронная версия). (Orthodox Encyclopedia - Pravenc.ru).
- (in Russian) 13 ноября по старому стилю / 26 ноября по новому стилю. Русская Православная Церковь - Православный церковный календарь на 2016 год.
