= Mocius =

Saint Mocius of Amphipolis
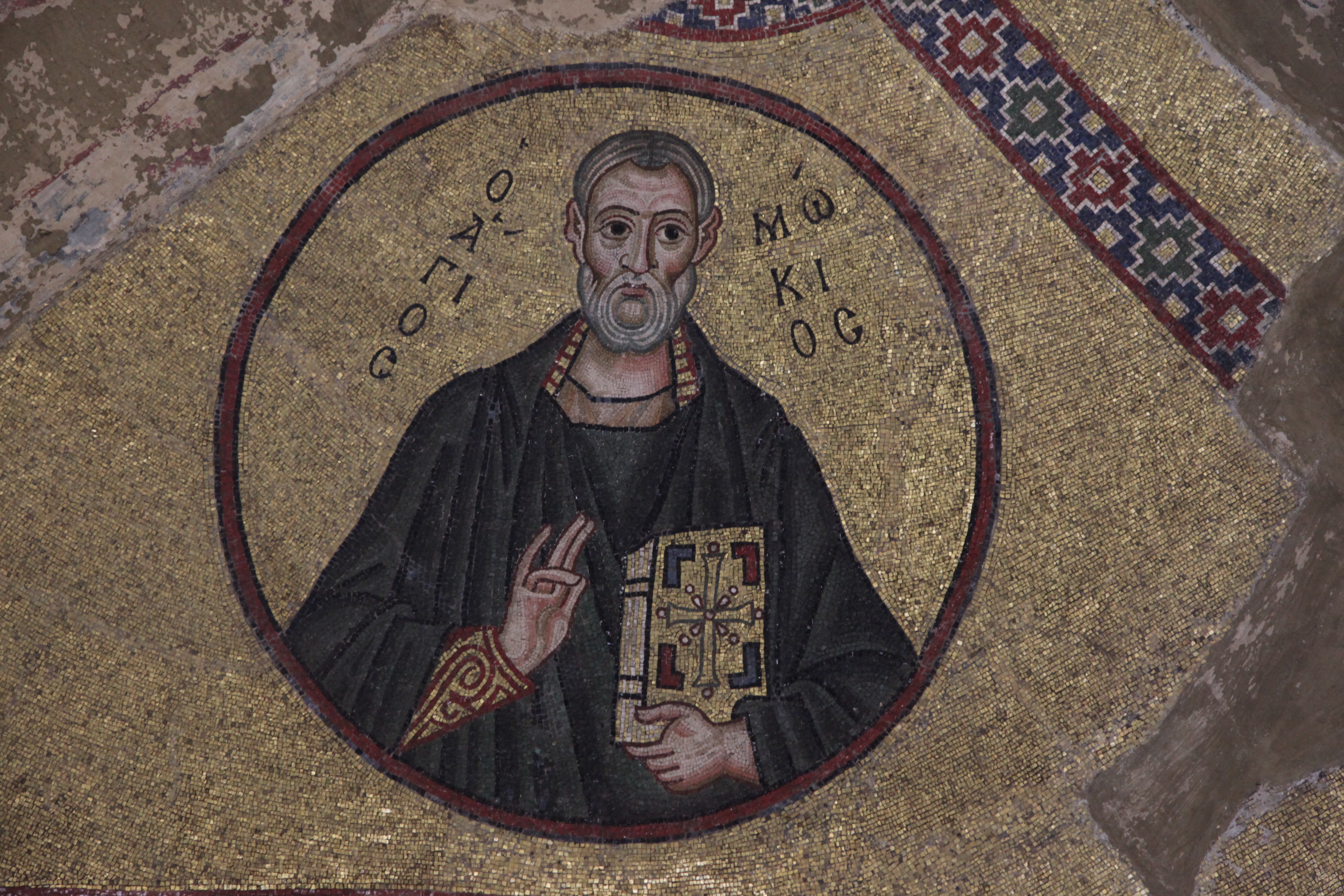
- Mosaic in Hosios Loukas

Priest
- Died: 288–295; Byzantium, Roman Empire
- Venerated in: Catholic Church; Eastern Orthodox Church
- Feast: 11 May

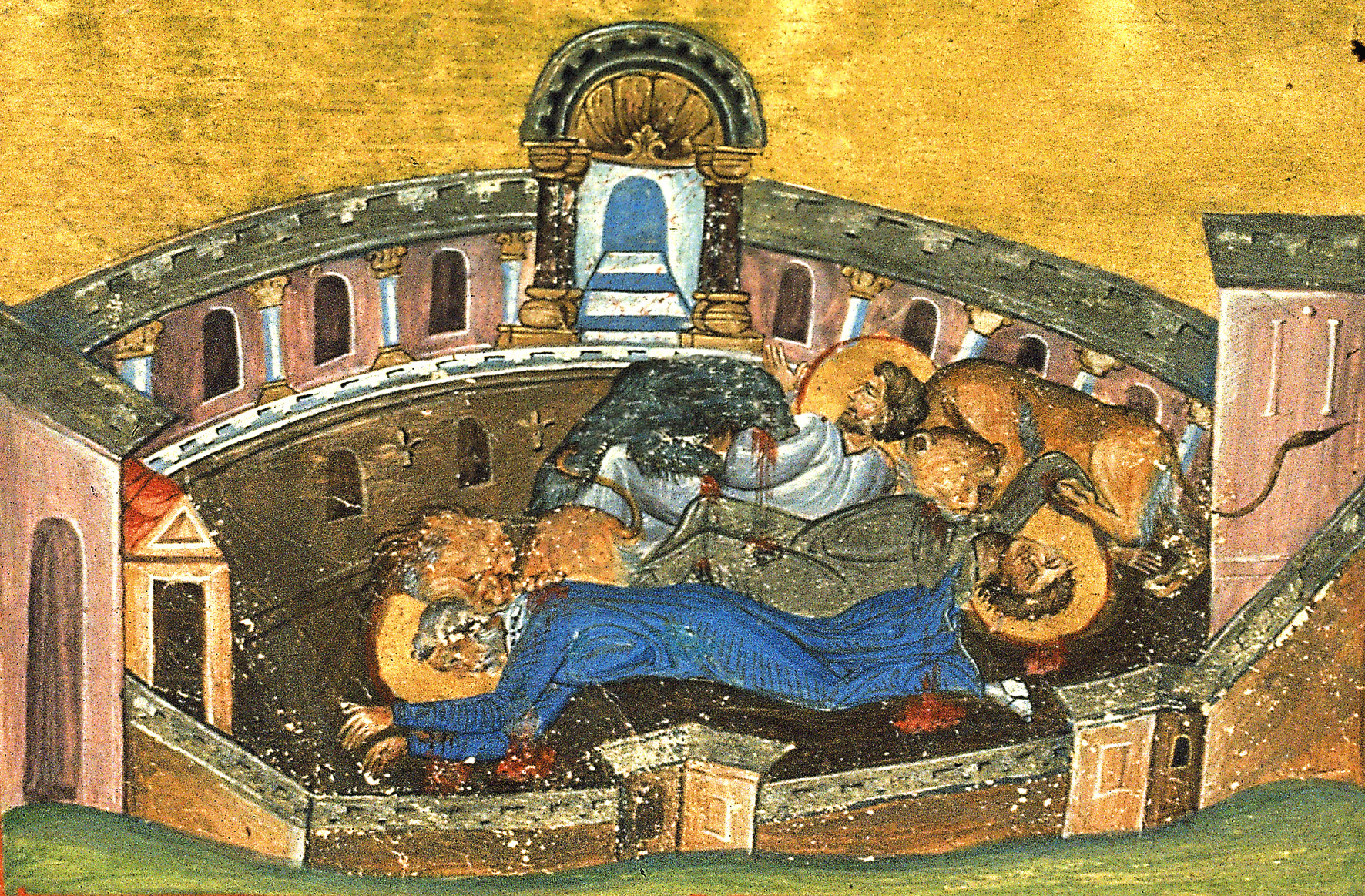
Painting showing the Martyrs Silvanus the Bishop of Emesa, Luke the deacon, and Mocius from the Menologion of Basil II (c. 1000 AD)

Saint Mocius (Greek: Μώκιος; died 288–295) was a Christian priest of Roman ancestry who lived in Amphipolis, Macedonia and became a Catholic and Orthodox saint.

== Life ==
During a persecution against Christians under the emperor Diocletian (284–305), St Mocius exhorted the pagans who had assembled for the pagan festival of Dionysus (Bacchus), to abandon the customs which accompanied this celebration. He urged them to repent, be converted to Christianity, and be baptized. At the temple of Dionysus, he destroyed a statue of the god.

Mocius was brought to trial before the governor of Laodicea and subjected to torture. After this he was put into a red-hot oven, where he remained unharmed, but the flames coming out of the oven scorched the governor. Then he was given to wild beasts to be eaten, but they did not touch him. The lions lay down at his feet. The people, seeing such miracles, urged that the saint be set free. The governor ordered the saint to be sent to the city of Perinthus, and from there to Byzantium, where St Mocius was beheaded.

His feast day is May 11 in both the Catholic and Orthodox Church.

== Legacy ==
The Emperor Anastasius I Dicorus (491–518) built an open air cistern, to supply water to the city of Constantinople (today's Istanbul). It is the third of the Late Roman Period cisterns and the largest in the city, named after the saint who was venerated in a nearby church. In Turkish, it is called "Altı Mermer Çukurbostanı". It has been converted into the Fatih Educational Park, but the ancient walls are still standing.

=== Church of St Mokios ===
A church dedicated to saint Mocius is said to have been built by Constantine I on top of a temple of Zeus. It was rebuilt by Pulcheria, Marcian or possibly Justinian I and restored again by Basil I in the 9th century. It was located between the Theodosian and Constantinian walls, perhaps to the west of the cistern named after the saint and close to the monastery of Theotokos ta Mikra Romaiou. The monastery also included a hospital and xenodochium and it is possible that the 11th century physician Ibn Butlan wrote his work The Physicians' Banquet in this monastery during his stay in Constantinople. The church gave its name also to the nearby cistern.
