= Uzun Yusuf =

Football pitch in Fındıkzade, Istanbul, Turkey

Uzun Yusuf is the name of a local Football pitch in Istanbul, in the Fındıkzade area. Its length and height is 26x48.

Since 2006 there have been a few tournaments taking place in Uzun Yusuf. They include: Şefu Tournament and TSL Tournament.
