= Victor and Corona =

2nd-century Christian martyrs

Saints Victor and Corona
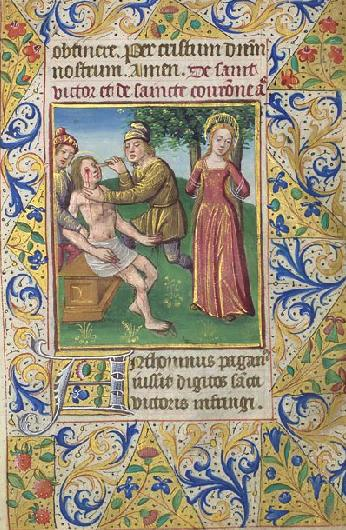
- Illuminated miniature of the martyrdom of Saints Victor and Corona, on a full leaf from a Book of Hours, France (Paris), c. 1480.

Martyrs
- Died: c. 170 AD
- Venerated in: Catholic Church; Eastern Orthodox Church
- Feast: 14 May (Catholic Church); 11 November (Eastern Orthodox Church, Julian calendar)
- Patronage: Feltre; Castelfidardo; Corona is invoked in connection with causes involving money, such as gambling or treasure hunting.

Saints Victor and Corona (also known as Saints Victor and Stephanie) are two Christian martyrs. Victor was a Roman soldier who was tortured and killed; Corona was killed for comforting him. Corona is invoked as a patron of causes involving money; she was not historically associated with pandemics or disease, but has been invoked against the coronavirus pandemic.

== Legend ==
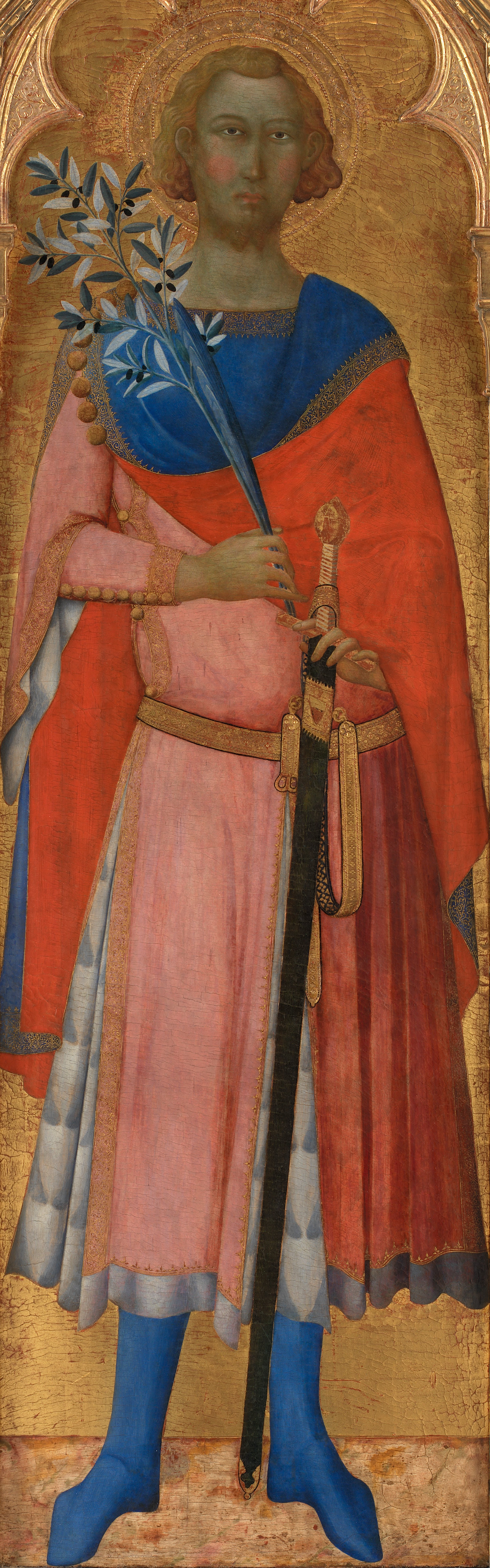
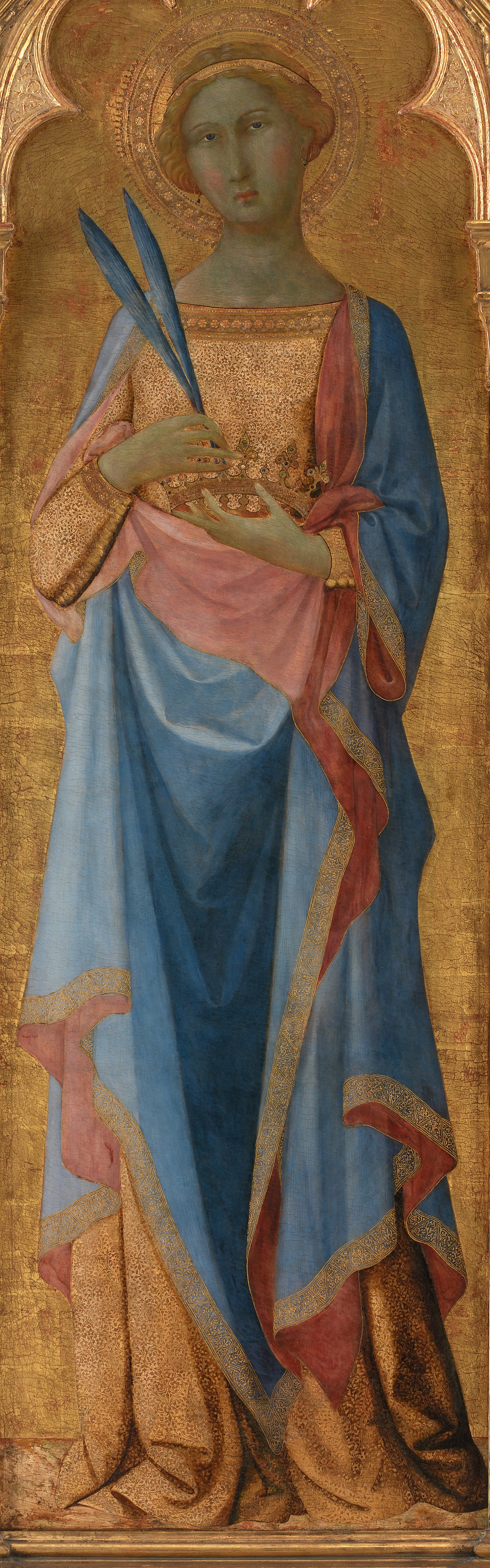
St Victor of Siena (left) and St Corona by the Master of the Palazzo Venezia Madonna in the National Gallery of Denmark.

Their legend states that Victor was a Roman soldier of Italian ancestry, who was tortured, including having his eyes gouged out, and was beheaded. Most sources state that he and Corona were killed in Roman Syria during the reign of Marcus Aurelius (around the 160s-170s AD), but various hagiographical texts disagree about the site of their martyrdom, with some stating that it was Damascus, while Coptic sources state that it was Antioch. Some Western sources state that Alexandria or Sicily was their place of martyrdom. They also disagree about the date of their martyrdom. They may have been martyred during the reign of Antoninus Pius, or Diocletian, while the Roman Martyrology states that it was in the third century when they met their death.

While he was suffering from the tortures, the sixteen-year-old wife of another soldier, named Corona or Stephanie (or Stefania or Stephana, from Greek στέφᾰνος, stéphanos 'crown', the Greek version of her Latin name, which also means 'crown') comforted and encouraged him. For this, she was arrested and interrogated. According to the passio of Corona, Corona was bound to two bent palm trees and torn apart as the trunks were released; the passio is considered largely fictional, and she herself may also be fictional. Other sources state that Victor and Corona were husband and wife.

There is also debate as to where Corona was from; differing accounts place her in Syria, Sicily, and Marseille.

== Veneration ==
Victor and Corona's memorial day is 24 November (11 November in the Julian Calendar). Their feast day is 14 May. Outside the town of Feltre in northern Italy, on the slopes of Mount Miesna, is the church of SS. Vittore e Corona, erected by the Crusaders from Feltre after the First Crusade.

Corona is especially venerated in Austria and eastern Bavaria. There is a chapel dedicated to her in Sauerlach, near Munich. There are two churches named after her in the Roman Catholic Diocese of Passau and two towns named after her in Lower Austria. A statue of her stands in the Münster Cathedral.

Around 1000 AD Otto III, Holy Roman Emperor brought Corona's relics to Aachen in western Germany. Her relics were rediscovered during excavation work at Aachen Cathedral in 1910. The relics were removed from a crypt and placed in a shrine inside the cathedral.

Corona is the patroness of causes involving money, such as gambling and treasure hunting, a result of a later treasure hunter who credited his success to invoking her. She is called upon by a treasure hunter to bring treasure, and then sent away through a similarly elaborate ritual. She was not historically a patron saint of or invoked against pandemics or disease, but in a modern case of a saint linked to patronage via folk etymology, she has been invoked against the COVID-19 pandemic. Her relics were to be exposed for public veneration once restrictions lifted.
