= Fındıkzade =

Coordinates: 41°1′33″N 28°56′59″E

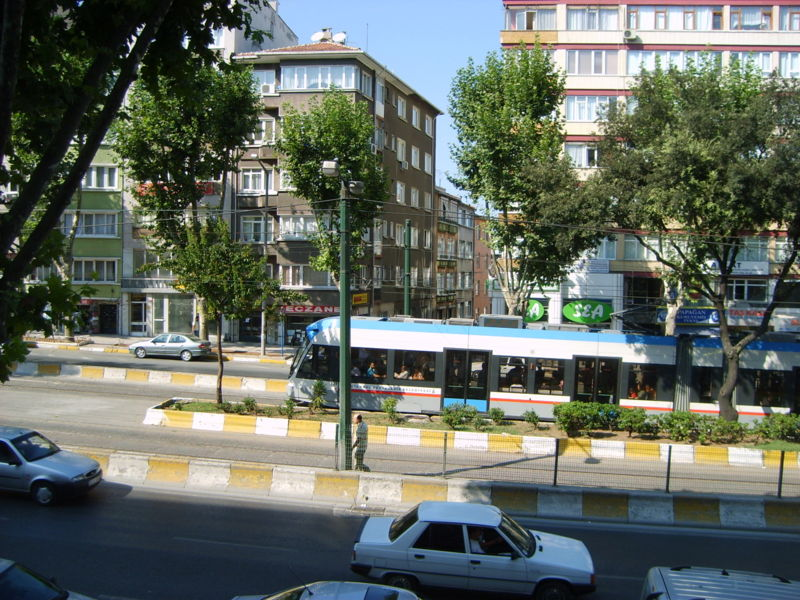
Fındıkzade, Istanbul

Fındıkzade is a quarter in the European side of Istanbul, located in the north side of Fatih, the province's capital district (the walled city), lying between the quarters of Topkapı and Aksaray, and adjacent to the Hasseki, Yusufpaşa and Çapa quarters. The main roads of this quarter are Millet Caddesi (now called Turgut Özal Millet Caddesi) and Vatan Caddesi (now called Adnan Menderes Vatan Caddesi).

== Health district of Istanbul ==
Three of the major city's hospitals are located here, making of it one of the most important health district in Istanbul.

== See also ==
- Uzun Yusuf
