= Altımermer =

Neighbourhood in Istanbul, Turkey

Coordinates: 41°0′37″N 28°56′05″E

Altımermer (originally Greek: Exi Mármara) is a quarter located in the European part of Istanbul, Turkey. It is located in the western part of the district of Fatih (the walled city). Although it is difficult to define exactly its boundary, Altımermer lies between the neighborhoods (mahalleler) of Kocamustafapaşa and Seyyid Ömer. The main axis of the quarter, Altımermer Caddesi, stretches between the neighborhoods of Kocamustafapaşa and Sayyidina Umar. The name of the quarter, "six marbles" in English, comes from the broken fragments of a fallen Byzantine column which during the Ottoman period were supposed to have magic properties. In this quarter was built between the 5th and the 6th century the Cistern of Mocius, the largest water reservoir in Constantinople, known since the Ottoman period as the Altımermer Çukurbostanı ("the sunken garden of Altımermer", since it was used as vegetable garden), and now turned into the education park of Fatih.
