= Petre Gruzinsky =

Head of the Royal House of Georgia
- Tenure: 3 February 1922 – 13 August 1984
- Predecessor: Pyotr Aleksandrovich Gruzinsky
- Successor: Nugzar Bagration-Gruzinsky
- Born: 28 March 1920; Tiflis, Georgian Democratic Republic
- Died: 13 August 1984 (aged 64); Tbilisi, Georgian SSR, USSR
- Burial: Svetitskhoveli Cathedral
- Spouse: Ketevan Siradze; Liya Mgeladze
- Issue: Princess Dali; Princess Mzia; Prince Nugzar
- House: Bagrationi dynasty
- Father: Pyotr Aleksandrovich Gruzinsky
- Mother: Tamara Dekanozishvili
- Religion: Georgian Orthodox Church

Petre Gruzinsky (Georgian: პეტრე გრუზინსკი; 28 March 1920 – 13 August 1984) was a Georgian poet and Honored Artist of the Georgian SSR (1979). He was a son of Prince Pyotr Aleksandrovich Gruzinsky and a scion of King George XII of Georgia and his wife, Tamara Dekanozishvili (1897-1977), daughter of a Georgian noblemen, whose family held the title of Aznauri.

== Biography ==
Gruzinsky was a descendant of the Kakhetian branch (Gruzinsky) of the Bagrationi dynasty, a former royal house of Georgia. His grandfather Alexander Bagration-Gruzinsky was son of Prince Bagrat of Georgia, the fourth son of King George XII of Georgia. Petre's literary career began in 1933, under the penname of Tamarashvili. Gruzinsky gained popularity as an author of lyrics for the songs by Revaz Lagidze, Giorgi Tsabadze, and Giya Kancheli, including for Lagidze's Tbiliso (Song of Tbilisi), one of the best known Georgian songs, and for the cult Soviet comedy Mimino (1977).

Gruzinsky was arrested and tried on charges of anti-Soviet activities and monarchist plot in 1945 and confined in a mental facility until released in 1948. Many of his literary works afterwards were published under the names of Gruzinsky's wife Liya Mgeladze and the journalist Irakli Gotsiridze. His first collection of poetry was published posthumously, in 2001. Gruzinsky died in 1984. He is buried at the Svetitskhoveli Cathedral in Mtskheta.

== Family ==
Petre Gruzinsky was married twice. He married in 1939, Ketevan Siradze (born 9 April 1915), daughter of Filimon Siradze, and had a daughter:

- Princess Dali Bagration-Gruzinsky (1939–2019). She married first at Tiflis, Bruno Babunoshvili (1938–1993). Secondly, she married Zurab Vakhtangovitch Kurashvili (born 1950).

In 1944, Gruzinsky married his second wife, Liya Mgeladze (born 19 August 1925, Manglisi), daughter of Dimitri Mgeladze (1889–1979), the literary scholar and former member of the government of the Democratic Republic of Georgia. They had two children:

- Princess Mzia Bagration-Gruzinsky (born 1945), unmarried and without issue.
- Prince Nugzar Bagration-Gruzinsky (1950–2025), a theater director and claimant to the headship of the royal house of Georgia from 1984 until his death.

== Honours ==
- Honoured Art Worker of the Georgian SSR (1979).
