= Bidzina Kvernadze =

- Born: July 29, 1928; Tbilisi, Georgia
- Origin: Georgian
- Died: July 8, 2010 (aged 74)
- Genres: Classical music; symphony; opera; Georgian contemporary music; folklore
- Occupations: Music director; composer
- Instrument: Piano
- Years active: 1959–2010
- Formerly of: Jansug Kakhidze; Tbilisi Opera and Ballet Theatre; Georgian State Symphony Orchestra; Tbilisi Center for Music and Culture; Tbilisi Symphony Orchestra
- Website: http://www.bidzina-kvernadze.narod.ru/index.htm

Bidzina Kvernadze (Georgian: ბიძინა კვერნაძე), (29 July 1928, Sighnaghi, Georgia, – 8 July 2010, Tbilisi), was a Georgian composer.

Bidzina was born in Sighnaghi, the Kakheti region of former Soviet Georgia to Alexander Kvernadze, a pharmacist, and Nino Nadirashvili, a music teacher.

In 1948, Bidzina presented his musical works to Examination Commission, and he was accepted to the Tbilisi State Conservatoire with the highest score. He finished the composition class in 1958, taught by Andria Balanchivadze. In the same year he was accepted as a member of the Union of Soviet Composers.

Among his honors are the title of "People's Artist of the USSR" (1979), the "Z. Paliashvili Prize" (1981, for My Entreaty, Old Georgian Inscriptions and Vocal-Symphonic Poem) and the "Shota Rustaveli State Prize" (1985, Opera "And it was in the eighth year"). He was also named an Honorary Citizen of Tbilisi (1995).

== Filmography ==
- 2001: Antimoz iverieli
- 1996: Qva (Short)
- 1995: Tsarsulis achrdilebi
- 1991: Premiera (TV Movie)
- 1990: Omi kvelastvis omia
- 1990: White Banners
- 1985: Ert patara qalaqshi
- 1985: Christmas tree of Neilon
- 1983: Andredzi (Short)
- 1983: Tsigni pitsisa (TV Movie)
- 1981: Me davbrundebi
- 1979: Salamuras tavgadasavlebi (Short)
- 1977: Data Tutashkhia (TV Series)
- 1977: The Wishing Tree
- 1977: Sikvaruli, khandzari da pompiero
- 1975: Chiriki da Chikotela
- 1967: Qalaqi adre igvidzebs
- 1966: Shekhvedra mtashi
- 1961: Chiakokona (sung by Lily Gegelia)
- 1961: Mgeris Borjomis nadzvi (TV Short)
- 1961: Udiplomo sasidzo
- 1960: Levana (Short)
- 1959: Ganacheni

== Works ==
=== Orchestral ===
- To the Dawn (symphonic poem), 1953
- Concerto No. 1, piano, orchestra, 1955
- Concerto, violin, orchestra, 1956
- A Fancy Dance, 1959
- Symphony No. 1, 1961
- Seraphita, 1964 (section of Choreographic Stories; may be performed separately as a concert work)
- Concerto No. 2, piano, orchestra, 1966
- Expectation, string orchestra, 1968
- Ceremonial Overture, 1977
- Symphonic Overture, 1984
- Symphony No. 2, string orchestra, 1986

=== Choral ===
- Immortality (cantata, texts by L. Chubabria, Petre Gruzinsky), speaker, mixed chorus, orchestra, 1971
- Cantata about Georgia (text by Petre Gruzinsky), baritone, mixed chorus, orchestra, 1971
- My Entreaty (vocal–symphonic poem, text by Nikoloz Baratashvili), mixed chorus, orchestra, 1974, revised 1977

=== Vocal ===
- Old Georgian Inscriptions (text by Giorgi Leonidze), tenor, orchestra, 1978
- Vocal–Symphonic Poem (texts by Eter Tataraidze, folk poems from Georgia), mezzo-soprano, orchestra, 1979
- Pray, Child (triptych, text by Iakob Gogebashvili), soprano, piano, 2001, revised 2002

=== Stage ===
- Choreographic Stories (ballet in 2 acts, scenario by Zurab Kikaleishvili, Guram Meliva, Chukurtma Gudiashvili, after Lado Gudiashvili), 1964 (one section may be performed separately as a concert work: Seraphita)
- Wives and Husbands (operetta in 2 acts, libretto by R. Lezgishvili), 1970
- Berikaoba (ballet in 1 act, scenario by Giorgi Alexidze), 1973
- And it was in the eighth year (opera in 2 acts, libretto by Robert Sturua, after Jacob of Tsurtavi), 1982
- Happier than we (opera in 2 acts, libretto by Robert Sturua, after Ilia Chavchavadze), 1987

== Awards ==
- 1998 – Orden of honour
- 1996 – Honorary citizen of Tbilisi
- 1985 – Shota Rustaveli State Prize
- 1981 – Zakaria Paliashvili Prize
- People's Artist of Georgia
