= Mehmandarova =

Mehmandarova is a surname. Notable people with the surname include:

- Gulnara Mehmandarova, Azerbaijani architect and researcher
- Sona Mehmandarova, Azerbaijani beauty contest winner
