= Gabashvili =

Gabashvili (Georgian: გაბაშვილი) is a Georgian surname, formerly of nobility. It may refer to:

- Besarion Gabashvili (whose pen name is Besiki), Georgian poet and diplomat
- Ekaterine Gabashvili, Georgian female writer
- Gigo Gabashvili, Georgian artist
- Konstantine Gabashvili, Georgian politician and diplomat
- Revaz Gabashvili, Georgian politician and historian
- Teymuraz Gabashvili, Russian tennis player
- Vasily Gabashvili, Georgian general
