= Leuville cemetery =

Cemetery in France

Leuville Cemetery

Details
- Country: France
- Coordinates: 48°37′20″N 2°15′58″E
- Find a Grave: Leuville Cemetery

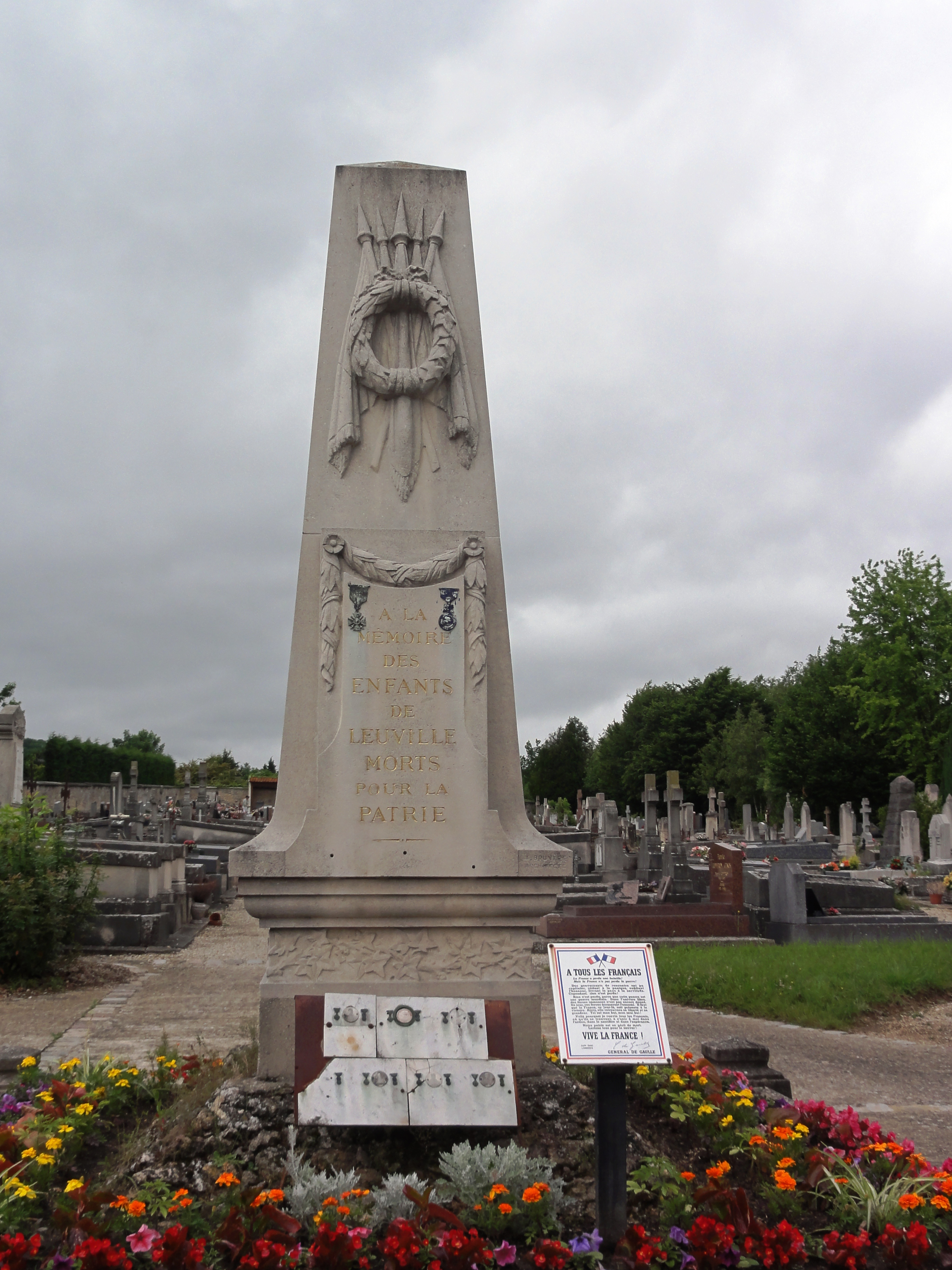

Leuville Cemetery (also known as Leuville sur Orge Communal Cemetery) is a cemetery in the French town of Leuville-sur-Orge, 25 km south of Paris. The cemetery is a burial ground to many Georgian political emigres who left the country after the Soviet invasion of Georgia in 1921. Among them are the members of the Government of the Democratic Republic of Georgia in Exile.

== Notable people buried at Leuville-sur-Orge ==
- Razhden Arsenidze, Georgian minister
- Akaki Chkhenkeli, Georgian minister
- Kakutsa Cholokashvili, National Hero of Georgia (until 2005)
- Evgeni Gegechkori, Georgian minister
- Vlasa Mgeladze, Georgian politician
- Noe Ramishvili, president of first Georgian government
- Grigol Robakidze, Georgian writer and public figure
- Kalistrate Salia, Georgian historian and politician
- Irakli Tsereteli, Georgian minister
- Mikheil Tsereteli, Georgian historian and politician
- Grigol Uratadze, Georgian politician
- Noe Zhordania, president of second and third Georgian governments
- Vladimer Goguadze, Georgian military figure, participant of the revolutionary movement in the Caucasus. Commander of the armored trains of the Georgian People's Guard in 1918–1921. He had the title of "Hero of the Republic" (1918).
- David Sagirashvili, Georgian journalist and politician

== Sources ==
- Georgian and French documents from Nametia Goguadze, Nikoloz Oragvelidze and Victor Nozadze (1971), Prof. Jean Bret and his students (2000), Luka Melua (2004).
- (French) Le "carré géorgien" du cimetière communal de Leuville-sur-Orge.
