= Lily Gegelia =

Lily Gegelia ლილი გეგელია
- Born: 12 August 1923; Tbilisi, Georgian SSR, Soviet Union
- Died: 21 November 2000 (aged 77) Tbilisi, Georgia
- Occupation: Singer
- Instrument: Singing

Lily Gegelia (Note: Georgian: ლილი გეგელია, romanized: Lili Gegelia) (12 August 1923 – 21 November 2000) was a Georgian singer. With a career spanning several decades, she was recognized as the People's Artist of the Georgian SSR (1989) and a laureate of the Georgian Order of Honor (1997).

Gegelia is especially known for her ballads, such as "Blue Violets" (ლურჯი იები) and "A small garden by my house" (ჩემს სახლთან პატარა ბაღია).

== Biography ==
Gegelia was born in Tbilisi on 12 August 1923.

Following a difficult period that saw the execution of her father and the arrest of her mother at the hands of Soviet authorities, Gegelia grew up in the western Georgian city of Kutaisi. She graduated from the history department of Tbilisi State University and the Tbilisi Music School No. 1 in 1942.

From 1954, she was on Georgian Radio. In 1956, Gegelia became a member of a prominent Georgian pop orchestra "Rero". Georgian and Russian composers specially composed songs for Gegelia, with notable works including "Gelati" (a poem by Jansugh Charkviani), "Nino came with the mountains (a poem by Ana Kalandadze), "Flower on the Snow" (composer Revaz Lagidze), "Chiakokona" (composer Bidzina Kvernadze); and "A small garden by my house" (composer Giorgi Tsabadze).

Together with "Rero", Gegelia toured England, Scotland, Belgium, Netherlands, Germany, Poland, Hungary, Czechoslovakia, and held solo concerts in the USSR, as well as Germany.

Gegelia died on 21 November 2000, in Tbilisi. She was interred at the Didube Pantheon.
