= Kamal Mammadbeyov =

Azerbaijani architect

Kamal Mamedbekov
- Born: Kamal Mamedbekov; March 20, 1924; Quba, Azerbaijan
- Died: September 2, 1997 (aged 73); Baku, Azerbaijan
- Spouse: Jamila Ashurekova Rzayeva
- Children: 2 children: Ogtay Mamedbekov; Gulnara Mehmandarov
- Parents: Huseynagha Mammadbeyov; Anna Mgeladze
- Relatives: Tofig Mamedbekov (brother); Leyla Mamedbekova (sister)

Kamal Huseynagha oglu Mammadbeyov (Azerbaijani: Kamal Məmmədbəyov; Russian: Кямал Мамедбеков; March 20, 1924 – September 2, 1997) was an architect, researcher, Azerbaijani and Soviet scientist. He was an academician of the International Academy of EC with a PhD in the Theory and History of Architecture and Restoration of Architectural Monuments. He was the first academic researcher and expert in urban planning to conduct scientific research specifically on the architectural and urban planning development of Sumgait. He also served as the first academic secretary of the Scientific and Methodological Council for the Protection of Monuments under the Presidium of the Academy of Sciences, and was a recognized expert in heritage protection. He was one of the first honored architects of the Azerbaijan SSR.

The result of years of Kamal Mamedbekov's research was a substantial body of scientific publications. He also served as a scientific editor of several academic works.

== Sumgait ==
Kamal Mamedbekov carried out the first studies in architecture and urban planning of the city of Sumgait. His book "Sumgait: Architectural and planning development" about architectural and planning development of the city. is preserved and available in the Library of Congress of the USA. He donated a large number of graphics and illustrations made by him to the archives of The Sumgait City Museum.

== See also ==
- Mammadbeyov, noble family of Azerbaijan
- Mgeladze, noble family of Georgia
