= Giorgi Kvinitadze =

Georgian military commander

- Born: Giorgi Chikovani; 21 August 1874; Dagestan, Russian Empire
- Died: 7 August 1970 (aged 95); Paris, France
- Resting place: Mtatsminda Pantheon
- Education: Cadet Corps in Tbilisi; St. Constantine Infantry School, St. Petersburg
- Occupations: Major general; Military commander
- Known for: Deputy Minister of War for the Transcaucasus Federal Government and Commander in Chief of the army of the Democratic Republic of Georgia
- Spouse: Mariam Makashvili (m. 1911; died 1960)
- Children: 3
- Relatives: Maryam d'Abo (granddaughter)

Giorgi Kvinitadze (Georgian: გიორგი კვინიტაძე; Russian: Георгий Иванович Квинитадзе, Georgy Ivanovich Kvinitadze; his real surname was Chikovani, ჩიქოვანი) (21 August 1874 – 7 August 1970) was a Georgian military commander who rose from an officer in the Imperial Russian army to commander-in-chief of the Democratic Republic of Georgia. After the Red Army invasion of Georgia, Kvinitadze went into exile to France, where he wrote his memoirs of the 1917–1921 events in Georgia. In 2013 he was posthumously awarded the title and Order of National Hero of Georgia.

== Biography ==
Kakutsa Cholokashvili (right) and General Giorgi Kvinitadze (left).

Born into the family of a colonel of the Russian army in Tiflis or Dagestan, Kvinitadze entered the Tiflis Cadet Corps in 1884, and then continued his military education at St Constantine Infantry School, St Petersburg, which he graduated from in 1894, being commissioned as a podpuruchik in the 153rd Vladikavkaz Infantry Regiment. He then served in Russian Poland. During the Russo-Japanese War (1904–1905) Kvinitadze was promoted to captain. In 1910 he graduated from the General Staff Academy and was dispatched to the Caucasian Military District headquarters.During World War I, in 1916, Kvinitadze was promoted to colonel and appointed a chief of staff of the 4th Caucasian Rifle Division. After the Russian Revolution of 1917, Kvinitadze, now major general, served as a Deputy Minister of War for the Transcaucasus federal government before becoming the Commander in Chief of the army of a newly independent Georgia in 1918. He resigned shortly thereafter due to his disagreement with the Menshevik leadership of the country. Later that year, however, he returned to military service in the capacity of Chief of Staff during the war with Armenia. In 1919, he commanded the Georgian troops that defeated Muslim revolutionaries in the Akhaltsikhe province, and occupied, on 20 April 1919, the hitherto Turkish-held city of Artvin. He helped establish a military school in Tiflis and served as its Commandant before being made Commander-in-Chief of Georgian army again early in May 1920, when the Bolsheviks attempted a coup d'état. He happened still to be on the spot when the Bolsheviks assaulted the military school as a preliminary to a coup. Kvinitadze, with his cadets, put up a stout resistance and successfully defended the building. Days later, he, in the head of the Georgian army, rolled back an attempt by the Soviet Russian troops to penetrate from Azerbaijan. During the Red Army invasion of Georgia of 1921, he was reappointed the Commander-in-Chief. After Georgia's defeat in the war in March 1921, Kvinitadze left for France, where he first worked as a clerk for Pathé Records and then ran a small business producing matsoni. He died in Chatou suburb of Paris in 1970 and was buried at the Georgian cemetery of Leuville-sur-Orge. Kvinitadze's remains were reburied with full military honors to the Mtatsminda Pantheon in Tbilisi on 26 May 2021. A street in Tbilisi, where Georgia's Ministry of Defense is located, was named after Kvinitadze in 2006.

== Family ==
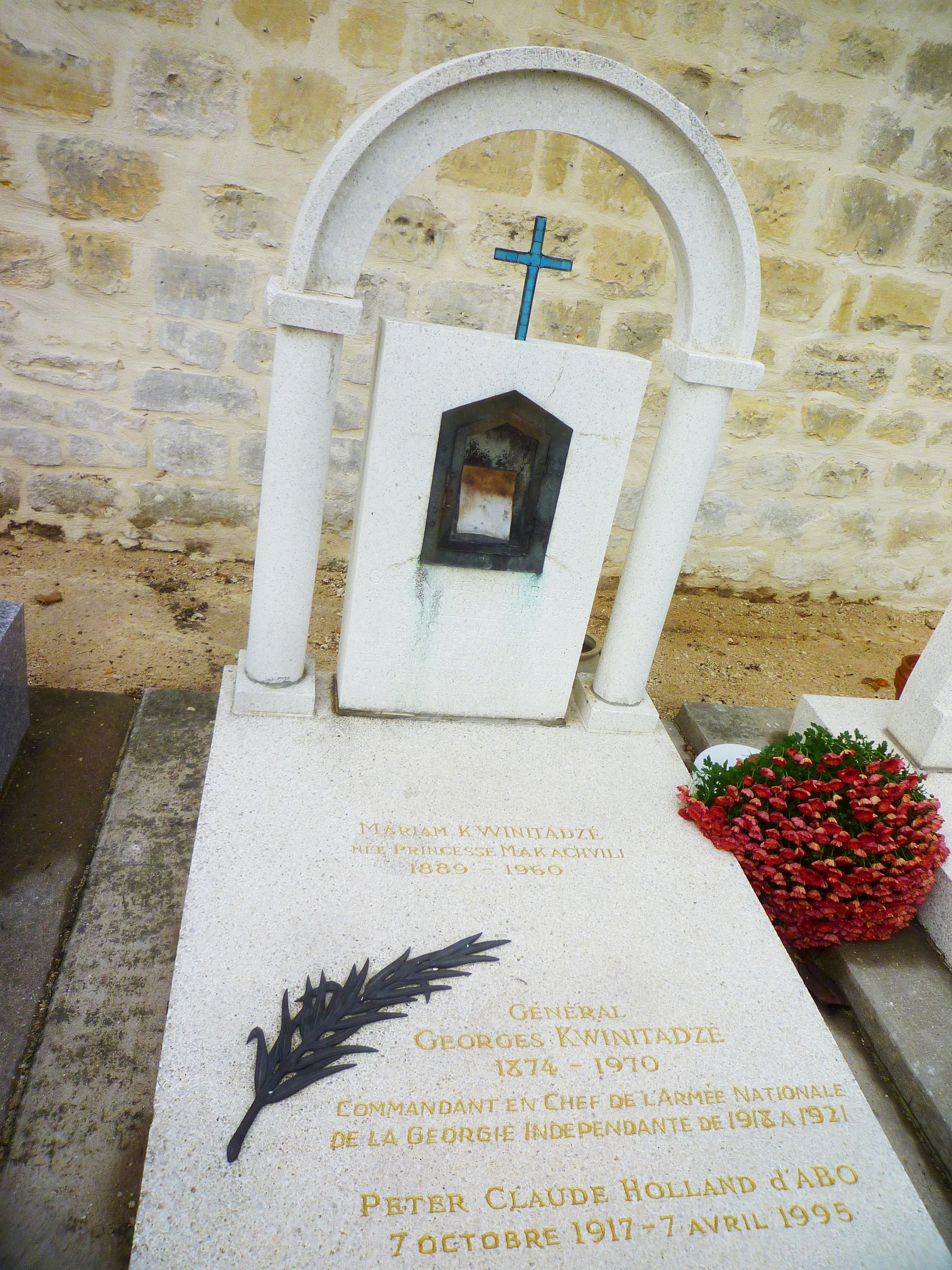
The grave of Mariam Makashvili and Giorgi Kvinitadze in Chatou.

In 1911 Kvinitadze married Princess Mariam Makashvili (28 August 1889 – 27 April 1960). They had three daughters: Ida, Tamar and Nino. Ida (b. 1912) married (1943) Georgian émigré general Giorgi Chkheidze (1907–1970). Tamar (b. 1913) married (1938) the Georgian émigré Georges Odichelidze (1899–1970), French officer of World War II. Nino (b. 1920) married (1955) a Dutchman Peter Claude Holland d'Abo (b. 7 October 1917); they are the parents of the British-French actress and former Bond Girl, Maryam d'Abo.

== Memoirs ==
Kvinitadze's Russian-language book My Memoirs from the Years of Independence of Georgia, 1917–1921 (Мои воспоминания в годы независимости Грузии, 1917–1921) first appeared in Paris in 1985 and was published in a Georgian translation in 1998. Writing most of the memoir in 1922, a year after Georgia's sovietization, Kvinitadze provides new details and personal observations about the troubled years of 1917–1921. In addition to being a military chronicle written by a participant of those events, Kvinitadze's memoirs are a political commentary, directing harsh criticism at the Mensheviks, accusing them of undermining the state and alienating the Georgian people with their socialist and internationalist rhetoric, incompetence and failure to defend the country against the anticipated foreign intervention.

Along with Zurab Avalishvili’s historical works, Kvinitadze’s memoirs are considered one of the best firsthand accounts of Georgia’s short-lived independence written abroad.
