= Melodies of Vera Quarter =

- Directed by: Giorgi Shengelaya
- Written by: Giorgi Shengelaia; Anzor Salukvadze
- Starring: Sofiko Chiaureli; Vakhtang Kikabidze; Ia Ninidze; Maia Kankava; Dodo Abashidze
- Cinematography: Aleksandre Mgebrishvili
- Music by: Giorgi Tsabadze
- Production company: Kartuli Pilmi
- Distributed by: RUSCICO (2004)
- Release date: 1973
- Running time: 97 minutes
- Country: Soviet Union
- Languages: Russian; Georgia; Italian

Melodies of Vera Quarter (Georgian: ვერის უბნის მელოდიები) is a 1973 Soviet musical comedy-drama film directed by Giorgi Shengelaia.

== Plot ==
Pavle, who is a poor cart-driver has two girls, Maro and Tamro. The girls have a dream to take classes at a ballet school, but Pavle cannot afford such a luxury. Vardo, a laundress, decides to help the little girls. For that purpose she steals a cattle, firewood and a mink coat from a rich merchant's house. She warms up Pavle's house with the stolen firewood and pays tutorship for the girls' ballet classes. Vardo gets caught for larceny. All the laundresses in the neighborhood go on strike in Vardo's support. Scared chief of local police sets Vardo free and enlists the girls in the ballet school.

== Awards ==
- 1977 — Special Jury Prize on San Sebastián International Film Festival, Spain
