= Kakutsa Cholokashvili =

Georgian military officer (1888–1930)

Kaikhosro (Kakutsa) Cholokashvili
- ქაიხოსრო [ქაქუცა] ჩოლოყაშვილი
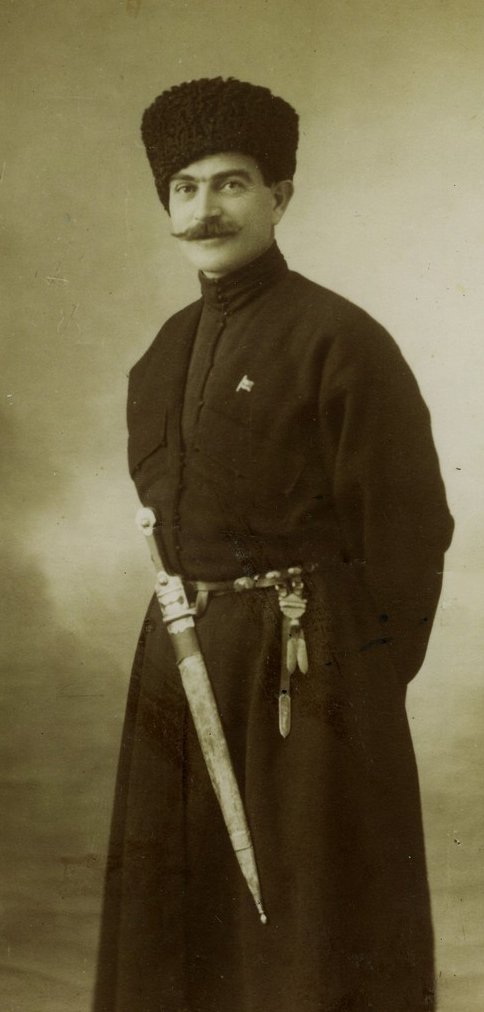
- Born: Kaikhosro Cholokashvili; 14 July 1888; Matani, Pankisi Gorge, Russian Empire (Russia) (now (Georgia (country)) Georgia)
- Died: 27 June 1930 (aged 41); Passy, Haute-Savoie, France
- Burial place: Cimetière de Saint-Ouen (1930); Leuville Cemetery (c. 1970); Mtatsminda Pantheon (2005)
- Spouse: Nino Meghvinetukhutsesi (1913)
- Military career
- Allegiance: Russian Empire (1909–1917); Democratic Republic of Georgia (1918–1921)
- Branch: Cavalry
- Service years: 1909–1921
- Rank: Colonel
- Nickname: Kakutsa
- Conflicts: World War I; Eastern Front; Caucasus campaign; Battle of Sarikamish; Persian campaign; Armeno-Georgian War; Sochi conflict; Red Army invasion of Georgia; Kakhet–Khevsureti Rebellion; August Uprising
- Awards: Gold Sword for Bravery (1916)

Kaikhosro "Kakutsa" Cholokashvili (Georgian: ქაიხოსრო [ქაქუცა] ჩოლოყაშვილი; French: Kakoutsa Tcholokachvili; Russian: Кайхосро [Какуца] Чолокашвили [Челокаев], Kaikhosro Chelokayev; born 14 July 1888 – 27 June 1930) was a Georgian military officer and a commander of an anti-Soviet guerrilla movement in Georgia. He is regarded as a national hero in Georgia.

Born of a noble family, Cholokashvili was a decorated officer of the Imperial Russian Army during World War I. After the Russian Revolution of 1917, he served in the ranks of the Democratic Republic of Georgia. Following the republic's overthrow in a Soviet invasion in 1921, Cholokashvili, with a band of followers, took to the mountains and fought a guerrilla campaign against the Soviet government in the province of Kakheti. After a failed August 1924 anti-Soviet rebellion, during which Cholokashvili commanded the largest single rebel contingent, he fled to France, where he died of tuberculosis in 1930. His remains were reburied, in a state funeral, from the Leuville Cemetery near Paris to the Mtatsminda Pantheon in Tbilisi, Georgia, in 2005. In 2013, he was posthumously awarded the title and Order of National Hero of Georgia.

== Early life and career ==
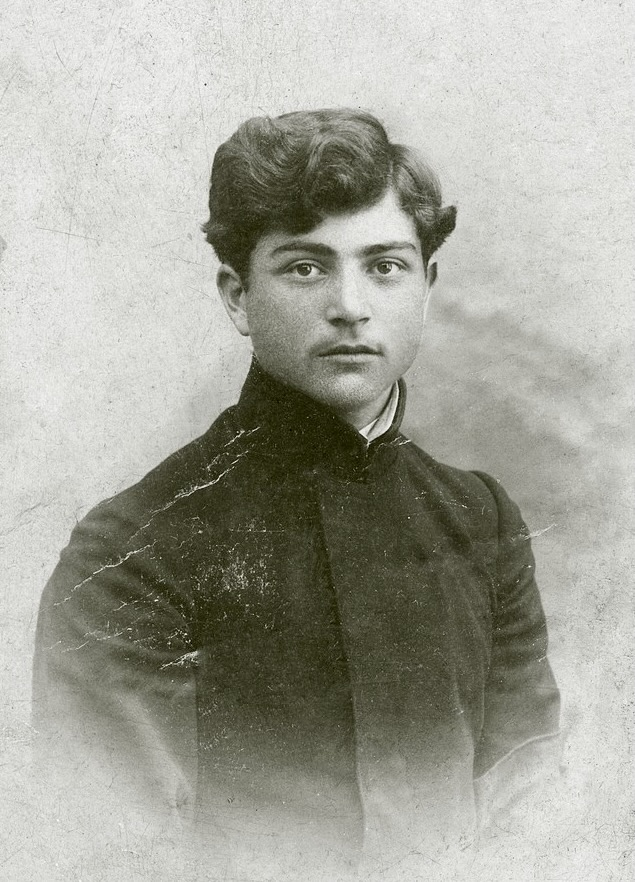
Kakutsa as a boy

Kakutsa Cholokashvili was born into an aristocratic family of Prince Ioseb Cholokashvili at the family estate at Matani in the eastern Georgian province of Kakheti (then part of the Tiflis Governorate, Russian Empire). The contemporary Russian administrative documents spelled his surname "Челокаев" (Chelokayev). Cholokashvili attended the Gymnasium for Nobility in Tiflis (Tbilisi), which was then directed by the historian Ekvtime Takaishvili. In 1909 he was drafted into the Russian military. He served in the 16th Tver Dragoon Regiment and returned to Georgia with the rank of podporuchik in 1912.

With the outbreak of World War I in 1914, Cholokashvili was recalled to active duty and assigned to lead a cavalry squadron on the Austro-Hungarian front. Wounded later that year, he was transferred to the Caucasus Front. During the Battle of Sarikamish in December 1914, he commanded a cavalry squadron under General Vasily Gabashvili and distinguished himself by capturing and defending a strategic fortification known as "the Eagle's Nest" against the overwhelming Ottoman troops. He was severely wounded and awarded the Gold Sword for Bravery in 1916. After treatment at the St. Nino Hospital in Tiflis, he was enlisted in the nascent Georgian Cavalry Legion which marched into Persia as part of General Baratov's 1915–1917 expedition. Shortly thereafter, he was promoted to the rank of podpolkovnik (lieutenant-colonel).

== Independent Georgia ==
After the Russian Revolution of 1917, Cholokashvili returned to Georgia and became involved in Georgia's independence movement. He joined the National Democratic Party of Georgia and helped organize national cavalry units early in 1918. After Georgia declared its independence as a Democratic Republic in May 1918, Cholokashvili was put in charge of a squadron in the Cavalry Division of the People's Guard of Georgia commanded by Colonel Giorgi Khimshiashvili. In this capacity, Cholokashvili served in the campaigns against Armenia (December 1918 – January 1919), White Russian forces (February–October 1919), pro-Bolshevik rebels in Gori (November–December 1919), and in a raid in the Batumi Oblast (February–March 1920). In April 1920, Cholokashvili and several of his fellow officers were dismissed from service after they protested against what they saw an unjustified dismissal and arrest of their colleague on criminal charges.

When the Soviet Russian Red Army invaded Georgia in February 1921, Cholokashvili was still negotiating his return to the army. He accompanied General David Chavchavadze to western Georgia to recruit volunteers for the Georgian cavalry. By the time they formed two cavalry squadrons and took to the field, Tiflis had fallen and a Soviet republic had been proclaimed in Georgia. In March 1921, the Georgian government and military leadership sailed in European exile; Cholokashvili remained in Georgia.

== Partisan leader ==
Kakutsa Cholokashvili (right) and General Giorgi Kvinitadze (left).

As the Soviets pushed for the efforts to consolidate their power in Georgia, an underground opposition movement emerged. In February 1922, Cholokashvili was arrested by the Soviet security agents on charges of "counter-revolutionary activities" in Sighnaghi in his native Kakheti, but he escaped and took to the mountainous Pankisi Gorge, where he formed a group of followers known as the Band of Sworn Men (შეფიცულთა რაზმი) and joined the rebellious Khevsur mountaineers. The Bolsheviks used air force and artillery to squash the uprising. With Chechnya as his refuge, Cholokashvili and his guerrillas held out for two years. Revenge killings of the Soviet secret police executioners made him a folk hero.

Foreign diplomats reported that "the affair of Chelokaev" was a source of much trouble for the Bolshevik military leaders. The Soviet officialdom and historians referred to the movement as "political banditry". In his 1976 study of the Georgian revolt, the Soviet Russian historian Trifonov wrote that "the most numerous and dangerous band was that of Chelokaev. In the fall of 1922 it consisted of about 500 persons."

In August 1924, Cholokashvili left his mountainous refuge once again to join a larger anti-Soviet uprising in Georgia. He took command of the single largest rebel unit operating in eastern Georgia. Cholokashvili raided the town of Manglisi on 29 August, but, unable to get closer to Tiflis, he withdrew and attacked the Bolsheviks at Dusheti. Hunted down by the Soviet forces, Cholokashvili escaped on several occasions before conceding defeat. In September 1924, he fled across the porous border with Turkey. The Cholokashvili family—his wife and two little daughters—were rounded up and put in jail; his father-in-law was executed. Kakutsa's younger brother, Simon, had been killed earlier, during the revolt in Kakheti.

== Emigration ==
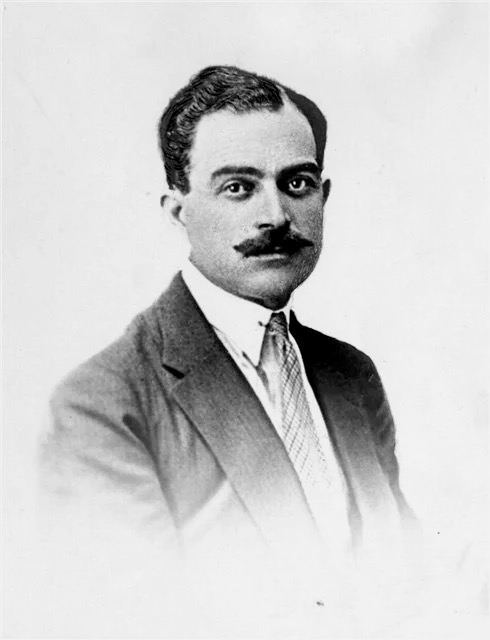
Portrait of Cholokashvili, late 1920s.

After leaving Georgia, Cholokashvili moved from Turkey to France, where many Georgian political émigrés had found refuge. He and his followers settled down at Viroflay, but received a cool welcome from the Leuville-sur-Orge-based Georgian government-in-exile, dominated by the Social-Democrats (Mensheviks). The Mensheviks treated Cholokashvili, a former nobleman, with suspicion, but were eager to exploit his standing among the Georgian nationalists for their political ends. On the other hand, Kakutsa (and many of his fellow military officers such as General Giorgi Kvinitadze) condemned the Mensheviks for their alleged disregard of national interests and indifference to the army. Later in the 1920s, Cholokashvili was close to the right-wing nationalistic organization Tetri Giorgi.

Making use of and contributing to further division among the Georgian émigrés, the Soviet intelligence leadership, especially, Lavrenty Beria, a Georgian, was able to infiltrate the expatriate Georgian community. Beria now targeted Cholokashvili, whose wife and children he held hostage. He even tried to bribe him into making a pro-Soviet recantation, but Cholokashvili demurred. Beria then foisted forged gold coins on Kakutsa and denounced him to the French police in 1927. Cholokashvili was arrested, but acquitted of charges. Cholokashvili was then framed for stealing French War Ministry funds. The Soviet agents also spread rumors that Kakutsa planned to assassinate the exiled Menshevik leaders, Noe Zhordania and Noe Ramishvili. Beria's designs were foiled as Kakutsa's health rapidly declined; he died of tuberculosis, in 1930, at the Plaz-Coutant sanatorium near Passy, Haute-Savoie.

Cholokashvili was first buried at the Cimetière de Saint-Ouen. He was later reburied to the Leuville Cemetery of Georgian émigrés and, finally, to the Mtatsminda Pantheon in Tbilisi, Georgia's capital, in 2005.

== Legacy ==
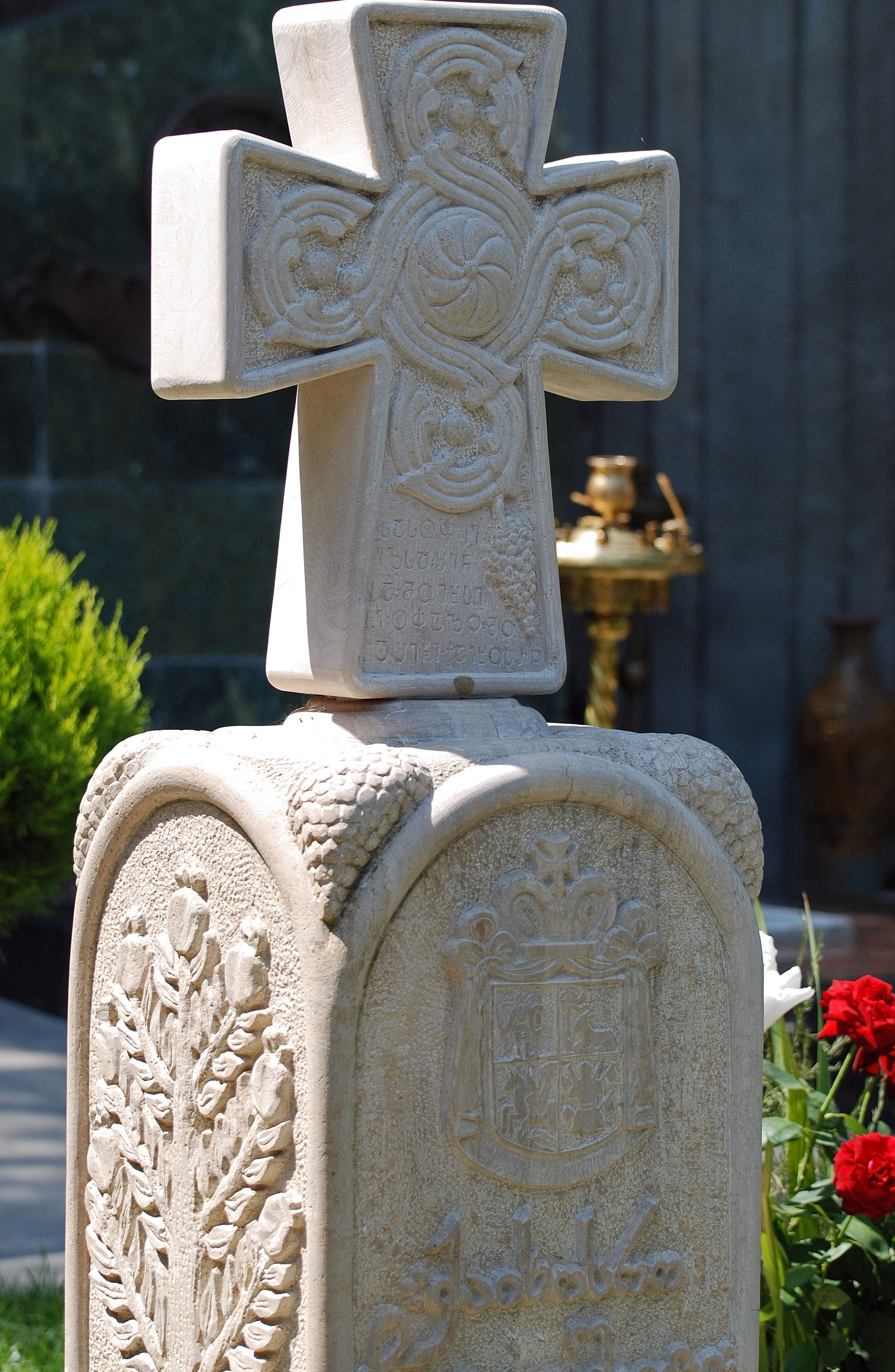
Kakutsa Cholokashvili's gravestone in Tbilisi

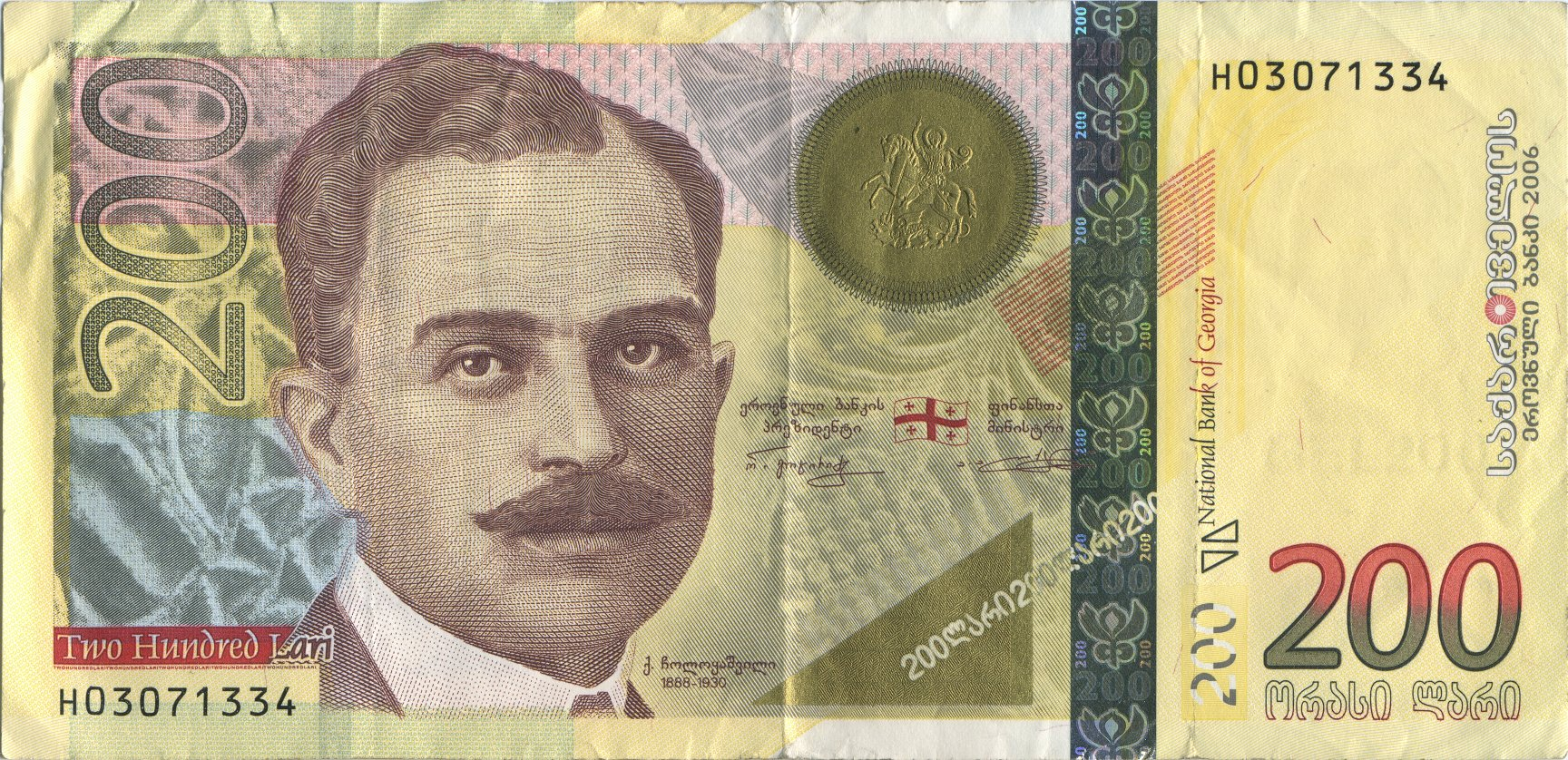
A 200-lari banknote featuring Kakutsa Cholokashvili's portrait

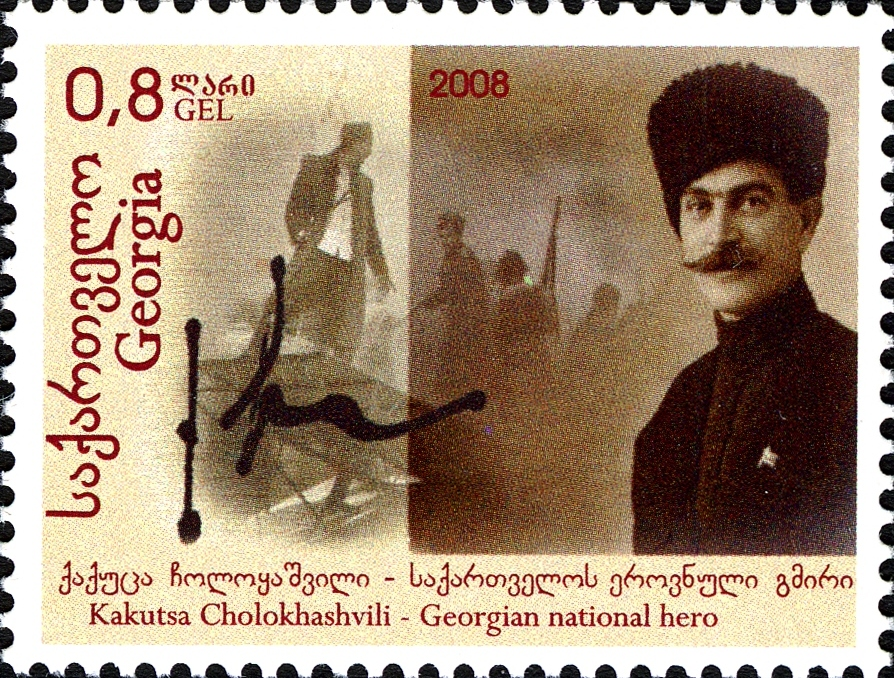
Kakutsa Cholokashvili on a 2008 stamp of Georgia

Under the Soviet rule, Cholokashvili's name was expurgated from the Georgian history for several decades. With the rise of nationalist and pro-independence movements in the 1980s, Kakutsa re-emerged as a major symbol of Georgian patriotism and resistance to the Soviet regime. In October 1990, his closest companion and comrade-in-arms, the 94-year-old émigré Aleksandre Sulkhanishvili, returned from his 66-year-long exile to a hero's welcome in Tbilisi, bringing Kakutsa's banner to Georgia. Sulkhanishvili died less than a month after his return and was buried in his native village.

On 20–21 November 2005, Cholokashvili's remains were brought to Georgia and afforded a state funeral, in the presence of high-ranking government and church officials and thousands of Georgians, at the Mtatsminda Pantheon. In 2007, Cholokashvili's portrait was depicted on Georgia's new 200-lari banknote. The same year, Tbilisi's Marjanishvili Theatre staged Levan Tsuladze's successful production of "Kakutsa Cholokashvili", an epic patriotic play by Guram Qartvelishvili.

== See also ==
- Konstantine Andronikashvili
