= Leyla Mammadbeyova (scientist) =

Azerbaijani pathologists

Leyla Mamedbekova
- Born: Leyla Mamedbekova; May 12, 1922; Quba, Azerbaijan
- Died: May 23, 2006 (aged 84); Baku, Azerbaijan
- Parents: Huseynagha Mamedbekova (father); Anna Mgeladze (mother)
- Relatives: Tofig Mamedbekov (brother); Kamal Mamedbekov (brother)

Leyla Huseynagha qizi Mamedbekova (Azerbaijani: Leyla Məmmədbəyova; May 12, 1922 – May 23, 2006) was an Azerbaijani and Soviet scientist, pathologist, professor, and honored scientist of Azerbaijan SSR. She was the first female professor in Azerbaijan in the field of pathology, the first female forensic medical expert, and the first female chief pathologist of Azerbaijan.

Leyla Mamedbekova studied under Professor Ivan Shirokogorov. For more than 40 years, she served as a director of the pathological laboratory at the Research Institute for Clinical and Experimental Medicine.

Mamedbekova published more than 200 scientific publications and was awarded several orders and medals.

== See also ==
- Mammadbeyov, noble family of Azerbaijan
