= Tbiliso =

თბილისო
English: Song of Tbilisi
- Tbiliso
- City anthem of Tbilisi, Georgia
- Lyrics: Petre Gruzinsky
- Music: Rezo Lagidze

The "Song of Tbilisi" also known as "Tbiliso", is a Georgian song and the unofficial anthem of the Georgian capital of Tbilisi. The melody was written by Rezo Lagidze with lyrics by Petre Gruzinsky (later the Russian lyrics were written by Mikhail Kvaliashvili) for a film released in 1959 dedicated to the 1500th anniversary of Tbilisi. The form Tbiliso is the vocative case of Tbilisi, an address to the city.

In 1958, the first performers of "Song of Tbilisi" were sisters Nazi and Natella Chapidze, accompanied by a choir and symphony orchestra. The song gained wide popularity in the Georgian SSR. In 1972, the song was recorded by the Georgian VIA "Orera" (lead singer Nani Bregvadze) and released by Melodiya on the disc "Art of the Peoples of the USSR. Music of Georgia." The concert film "Moscow Made Us Friends" was released on the Soviet Central Television, where "Tbiliso" was performed by the ensemble.

== Lyrics ==
Georgian Original:

ნეტავ სად არის კიდევ ცა,
უძიროდ ლურჯი, ხალასი,
სწორედ ისეთი, როგორც შენია.
ნაიარევი წარსული,
ნანგრევი ნარიყალასი,
ჭაღარასავით შემოგრჩენია.

თბილისო — მზის და ვარდების მხარეო,
უშენოდ — სიცოცხლეც არ მინდა,
სად არის სხვაგან ახალი ვარაზი,
სად არის ჭაღარა მთაწმინდა.

ჩაივლი მტკვართან ხეივანს
და გაზაფხულის მაყრები
მეგებებიან მწვანე ჭადრები.
აქ არ იმღერო, ძნელია,
აქ ხომ ვერხვებიც მღერიან
და ცაც ფირუზზე ლურჯი ფერია.

English Translation

I wonder where else the sky is,
bottomlessly blue, pure,
exactly like yours.
The scarred past,
the ruined Narikalas,
has remained with you like a graying.

Tbilisi — the land of the sun and roses,
without a shadow — I don't even want to live,
where else is the new Varazi,
where is the graying Mtatsminda.

I walk along the alley by the Mtkvari River
and the green umbrellas of spring cover me.
It's hard not to sing here,
because the poplars sing here too
and the sky is bluer than turquoise.

Russian Official Lyrics

Такой лазурный небосвод
Сияет только над тобой,
Тбилиси, мой любимый и роднойǃ
И Нарикала здесь стоит,
Как память прошлых тяжких бед.
Твою главу венчая сединой.

Расцветай под солнцем, Грузия моя,
Ты судьбу свою вновь обрела.
Не найти в других краях таких красот,
Без тебя и жизнь мне не милаǃ

Идёшь аллей вдоль Куры,
И над тобой платанов сень
Своей прохладой в знойный день манит.
И песня рвётся из груди,
И даже листья все поют
Седой Куре, одетой здесь в гранит.

== Performances ==
During the 2020 parliamentary election, Vakhtang Kikabidze caused controversy for singing a verse of the song in Russian during a campaign rally, something he justified with his desire "to let everyone know how beautiful Georgia is."

== See also ==
- Erebuni-Yerevan
- Şən Azərbaycan
- Moya Moskva
