= Mehmandarov =

The Mehmandarovs are noble family of Azerbaijan.

== It may refer to the following people ==
- Karim bey Mehmandarov (1854-1929) — Physician. One of the first Azerbaijani therapeutist and surgeon. First Azerbaijani therapeutist and surgeon graduated from St. Petersburg Medical-Surgical Academy.
- Samad bey Mehmandarov (1855-1931) — General of the artillery in the Imperial Russian Army. Minister of Defense of Azerbaijan Democratic Republic.
- Gulnara Mehmandarov (born in 1959) — Architect and researcher, PhD in theory and history of architecture and restoration of architectural monuments, professor.Corresponding Member of the International Academy of Architecture of EA.First President of ICOMOS (UNESCO) Azerbaijan.
- Mikhail Tushinsky Mehmandarov (1882–1962) — Medical scientist, therapeutist, and infectious disease specialist, and an Academician of the USSR Academy of Medical Sciences (since 1945). The first Chief Therapist of Leningrad from 1942 to 1949.
