= Kurashvili =

Kurashvili (Georgian: ყურაშვილი) is a Georgian surname. Notable people with the surname include:

- Gujar Kurashvili (born 1951), Georgian general
- Mamuka Kurashvili (born 1970), Georgian general
- Tsira Kurashvili (born 1962), Georgian writer, poet, children's author, and philologist
