= Kakhet–Khevsureti rebellion =

- Part of the Russian Civil War; Red Army invasion of Georgia
Date	May 1921 – December 1921
Location	Kakheti and Khevsureti regions of Georgia
Result	Rebellion defeated: Flight of Cholokashvili to southern Chechnya

Belligerents
Georgian SSR: Georgian Revkom; Russian SFSR	(Democratic Republic of Georgia) Committee for the Independence of Georgia

Commanders and leaders
	Kakutsa Cholokashvili

The Kakhet–Khevsureti rebellion (Georgian: კახეთ-ხევსურეთის აჯანყება) was a rebellion in 1921 against the Bolshevik forces in the Kakheti and Khevsureti regions of Georgia (then the Georgian SSR) following the Red Army invasion of Georgia.

The rebellion followed the Svaneti uprising of 1921 and was organized by the Committee for Independence of Georgia and its Military Committee, consisting of the former officers of the Democratic Republic of Georgia. The leader of the movement was Prince Kakutsa Cholokashvili, colonel of the Georgian army, formerly a Polkovnik in the Imperial Russian Army and hero of the Battle of Sarikamish during World War I. Since the spring of 1921 Cholokashvili organized strong militia in Kakheti and Khevsureti from experienced Georgian army personnel and noblemen including M. Lashkarashvili, Simon Bagration-Mukhraneli, L. Lekvinadze, S. Andronikashvili, A. Sumbatashvili, Sh. Vachnadze, P. Palavandishvili, Sh. Palavandishvili, etc.

The militia had a close contact to Catholicos-Patriarch Ambrose and enjoyed the support of the mountainous clans of eastern Georgia.

First, the militiamen blocked all the roads to Tusheti, Pshavi, and Khevsureti and after winning the battle in Zhinvali, the army moved in Khevsureti. Notably, the Bolsheviks used vast inexperienced military resources, including combat aviation, against the militiamen and had heavy casualties whereas the casualties of Cholokashvili's force was zero in some cases

The rebellion was weakened from disagreement within different political parties of Georgia. For example, Social Democrats thought that Cholokashvili, a nobleman, should not be the leader of a Partisan army. On the other hand, the Bolsheviks arrested and executed supporters of militia in Kartli and Kakheti and moved more army divisions from Grozny.

Combination of hostility of Cheka towards the population of Georgia and disagreement between different political parties forced Cholokashvili to escape to the neighboring Chechnya, whence he made several inroads into Georgia, preventing the Bolsheviks from gaining a foothold in the eastern Georgian mountains before joining the major revolt against the Soviets in August 1924.

== See also ==
- August Uprising
- Svaneti uprising of 1921
