= Svaneti uprising =

- Part of the Russian Civil War; Red Army invasion of Georgia
Date	May 1921 – December 1921
Location	Svanetia
Result	Uprising crushed

Belligerents
Georgian SSR: Georgian Revkom; Russian SFSR: Red Army; VOKhR	(Democratic Republic of Georgia) National Democrats of Georgia

Commanders and leaders
Lavrentiy Beria	Mosostr Dadeshkeliani; Nestor Gardapkhadze; Bidzina Pirveli

Strength
1,600 (Soviet sources)	Unknown

The Svaneti uprising was an unsuccessful rebellion against the recently established Bolshevik regime in Georgia in 1921.

The uprising broke out in Svaneti, a highland western Georgian province, almost immediately after the Red Army invasion of Georgia and the establishment of the Georgian SSR (February–March 1921). The first disturbances among the local peasants appeared already in May 1921, and quickly developed into an armed revolt against the highly unpopular Revolutionary Committee of Georgia (Revkom), an acting Bolshevik government in the transitional period. The guerrilla detachments led by Mosostr Dadeshkeliani, Nestor Gardapkhadze and Bidzina Pirveli, disarmed the Svaneti-based Red Army units in September, and launched preparations for the march on Kutaisi, the second largest city of Georgia. The Georgian Revkom, which faced the distinct prospect of a nationwide insurrection and civil war, ordered, on October 7, 1921, the formation of special punitive detachments to fight the insurgents who were denounced as "political bandits". On November 15, 1921, Soviet officials reported that the number of Svanetian rebels amounted to 1,600, and their actions were coordinated by the National-Democratic Party of Georgia, which maintained contacts with a Tbilisi-based Menshevik organization.

The fighting in Svaneti continued for six months, but the Soviet troops managed to curb the spread of the uprising into neighboring regions. By late December 1921, the fresh Red Army reinforcements finally crushed the revolt. The chief rebels were executed and severe repressive measures were established in the area. The defeat of the Svanetian rebellion forced major Georgian opposition parties to seek closer cooperation, which would later conclude with the generalization of an anti-Soviet uprising in August 1924.

== See also ==
- August Uprising
- Kakhet–Khevsureti rebellion
