= 1920 Georgian coup attempt =

Failed Bolshevik coup in the Democratic Republic of Georgia

- Part of the Russian Civil War
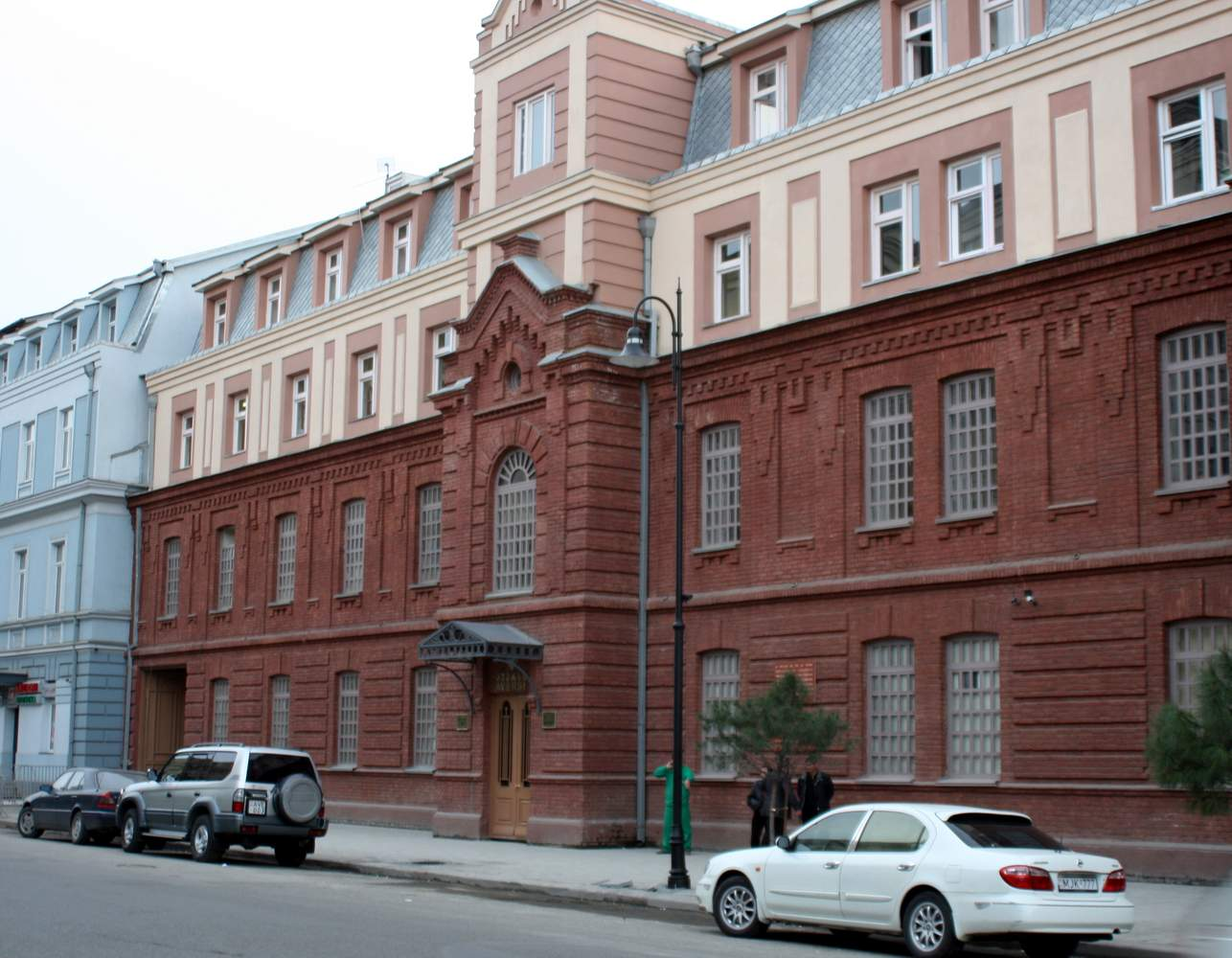
- The former Military College in Tbilisi, targeted during the coup
Date	May 2–3, 1920
Location	Georgia
Result	Georgian victory: Treaty of Moscow signed

Belligerents
Georgian Bolsheviks supported by: Soviet Russia	(Democratic Republic of Georgia) Georgian government

Commanders and leaders
Sergo Ordzhonikidze	Giorgi Kvinitadze

Strength
Approx 25 fighters	Georgian military cadets

Casualties and losses
Several killed and wounded, three captured and later executed	
- A simultaneous invasion of Georgian territory from Azerbaijan was repulsed and a treaty of mutual recognition signed by Georgia and Russia on May 7

The Georgian coup in May 1920 was an unsuccessful attempt to take power by the Bolsheviks in the Democratic Republic of Georgia. Relying on the 11th Red Army of Soviet Russia operating in neighboring Azerbaijan, the Bolsheviks attempted to take control of a military school and government offices in the Georgian capital of Tiflis on May 3. The Georgian government suppressed the disorders in Tiflis and concentrated its forces to successfully block the advance of the Russian troops on the Azerbaijani-Georgian border. The Georgian resistance, combined with an uneasy war with Poland, persuaded the Red leadership to defer their plans for Georgia's Sovietization and recognize Georgia as an independent nation in the May 7 treaty of Moscow. The Bolsheviks eventually took control of Georgia by invading the country one year later.

== Background ==
After their failure to secure the control of government in Georgia following the Russian Revolution of 1917, most of the Bolshevik Georgian leaders relocated to Soviet Russia, from where they guided underground activities aimed at undermining the Menshevik-dominated government in Tiflis. A series of attempts to lead a peasant revolution against the Mensheviks were rendered abortive from 1918 to 1919, but preparations for a larger-scale revolt had been set in motion.

The overthrow of the Democratic Republic of Azerbaijan by the Red Army in April 1920 created a precedent for the Bolsheviks in Georgia. Georgia had been in a defense alliance with Azerbaijan since 1919, but the Menshevik government hesitated to get involved in the conflict. In his April 30 speech, Georgian Premier Noe Zhordania stated that his country had been prepared to come to aid to Azerbaijan provided that the latter's own people fought for their independence. But as the Reds met minimal resistance in Baku, the Georgian government chose not to, a decision that was heavily criticized by the opposition. In conclusion, Zhordania declared that Georgia, if attacked, would defend its independence.

== Attempted coup ==
Sergo Ordzhonikidze, a Bolshevik commissar with the Red Army in the Caucasus and close ally of Joseph Stalin, tried to persuade the Russian leader Lenin to allow an advance into Georgia. On May 1, the Georgian government ordered mobilization and appointed General Giorgi Kvinitadze, Director of the Tiflis Military College, as commander-in-chief. The Bolsheviks in Georgia, fully confident that the Red Army would continue its march into Georgia, no longer hesitated. Following the restive May 1 International Workers' Day manifestations and unrest in Tiflis, the Bolsheviks formed and supported armed groups to take control of government buildings. On the night of May 2–3, some 25 Bolshevik fighters attacked the Tiflis Military College as a preliminary step to taking power. General Kvinitadze was still in residence there, and he and his cadets resisted, killing and wounding several attackers. Afterwards, the ringleaders, three Armenian Bolsheviks, were court-martialed and executed. The attempt to take power had failed and Bolsheviks were rounded up throughout Tiflis and other Georgian towns.

== Border clashes ==
In the meantime, the Red Army, upon reaching the Georgian-Azerbaijani frontier, continued to advance into Georgian territory apparently on Ordzhonikidze's own initiative. Having successfully dealt with the unrest in Tiflis, the Georgian government concentrated all its forces on the border with Azerbaijan and repulsed the Red Army detachments, staging a counter-offensive. The Russian government tried to maintain that this fighting was a local conflict between Georgia and Soviet Azerbaijan. Facing renewed hostilities with Poland, the Soviets concluded that under the circumstances it would cost too much to open a second front and occupy Georgia. Lenin decided for the moment to give up the attempt and agreed on negotiations for which the Georgian delegation had been in Moscow since late April, days before the attempted invasion. On May 7, 1920, Russia and Georgia signed a treaty of mutual recognition.

== See also ==
- May Uprising, a similar coup attempt in Armenia
