= Pyotr Aleksandrovich Gruzinsky =

Head of the Royal House of Georgia
- Tenure: 1865 – 3 February 1922
- Predecessor: Alexander Bagratovich Gruzinsky
- Successor: Petre Gruzinsky
- Born: 26 April 1857
- Died: 3 February 1922 (aged 64)
- Spouse: Tamara Dekanozishvili
- Issue: Prince Konstantin; Prince Petre
Names
- Petre Aleksandres dze Bagrationi Gruzinsky
- House: Bagrationi dynasty
- Father: Alexander Bagratovich Gruzinsky
- Mother: Princess Elena Tarkhan-Mouravi
- Religion: Georgian Orthodox Church

Prince Petre (Georgian: პეტრე), known in Russia as the tsarevich Pyotr Aleksandrovich Gruzinsky (Russian: Пётр Александрович Грузинский) (26 April 1857 – 3 February 1922) was a Georgian prince (batonishvili).

== Early life and ancestry ==
Born a descendant of the Kartli-Kakhetian branch of the Bagrationi dynasty, the former royal house of Georgia, Petre was the son of Prince Alexander Gruzinsky and his first wife, Princess Elena Tarkhan-Mouravi (1831-1903).

== Marriage and issue ==
Prince Petre married Tamara Dekanozishvili (1897–1977), at an unknown date by the historians (certainly during the war turmoil). She was born into a family of a Georgian nobility, whose family held the title of Aznauri. Tamara Dekanozishvili, who was 40 years his junior, was firstly [or secondly] married to Aleksandr Timofeevich Oboladze (1884–1923).

They had two sons:

1. Konstantin (1915–1939).
2. Petre (28 March 1920 – 13 August 1984).

== Sources ==
1. ბაგრატიონები, თბილისი, 2003, გვერდი 537 Bagrations, Tbilisi, 2003, page 537
2. პეტრე ბაგრატიონ-გრუზინსკი, თბილისი, 2004, გვერდი 71 Petre Bagration-Gruzinsky, Tbilisi, 2004, page 71
3. ჩიმაკაძე გ. ცხოვრება და ღვაწლი დავით სარაჯიშვილისა, თბილისი, 2003, გვერდი 133 Chimakadze G. Life of David Sarajishvili, Tbilisi, 2003, page 133
4. ჯაგოდნიშვილი თ. ერეკლეს ეპოსი, თბილისი, 2005, გვერდი 180 Jagodnishvili T. Epos of Erekle, Tbilisi, 2005, page 180
5. Джавахишвили Н. Грузины под российским флагом, Тб., 2003, с.42.
