= Gulnara Mehmandarova =

Azerbaijani architect and researcher

- Gülnarə Mehmandarova
- Born: Gulnara Mamedbekova; August 9, 1959 (age 66); Azerbaijan
- Spouse: Kerim Mehmandarov
- Children: 2 children: Rustam Mehmandarov; Jamila Mehmandarova
- Parents: Kamal Mamedbekov (father); Jamila Rzayeva (mother)
- Relatives: Oktay Mamedbekov (brother)

Gulnara Mehmandarova (Azerbaijani: Gülnarə Mehmandarova; born in 1959) is an Azerbaijani architect, researcher (historian of architecture and art) and Corresponding Member of the International Academy of Architecture of Oriental Countries. She has a PhD in theory and history of architecture and restoration of architectural monuments. She has published more than 70 scientific publications.

== Work with World Heritage Sites, UNESCO ==
=== World Heritage List (WHL), UNESCO ===
Mehmandarova has prepared the documentation for the proposed inclusion of several architectural monuments in Azerbaijan onto the List of World Heritage Sites, including the Walled City of Baku with the Shirvanshah's Palace and Maiden Tower (declared a UNESCO World Heritage Site in 2000), and the Fire Temple "Ateshgah" in Surakhany

== Work with International Council on Monuments and Sites (ICOMOS) ==
- ICOMOS-CIVVIH — member of The International Scientific Committee on Historic Towns and Villages of ICOMOS
- ICOMOS-IWC — member of The International Scientific Wood Committee of ICOMOS
- President of Azerbaijan Committee of International Council on Monuments and Sites (ICOMOS)

== Memberships in the Unions of Architects ==
- National Association of Norwegian Architects
- Society for the Preservation of Ancient Norwegian Monuments
- International Academy of Architecture of Oriental Countries
- Union of Architects of Azerbaijan
- Union of Architects of USSR — Soviet Union

== See also ==
- Mammadbeyov, noble family of Azerbaijan
- Mgeladze, noble family of Georgia
- Ashurbeyov, noble family of Azerbaijan
- Mehmandarov, noble family of Azerbaijan
