= Karim bey Mehmandarov =

Azerbaijani physician (1854–1929)

Karim bey Mehmandarov Kərim bəy Mehmandarov
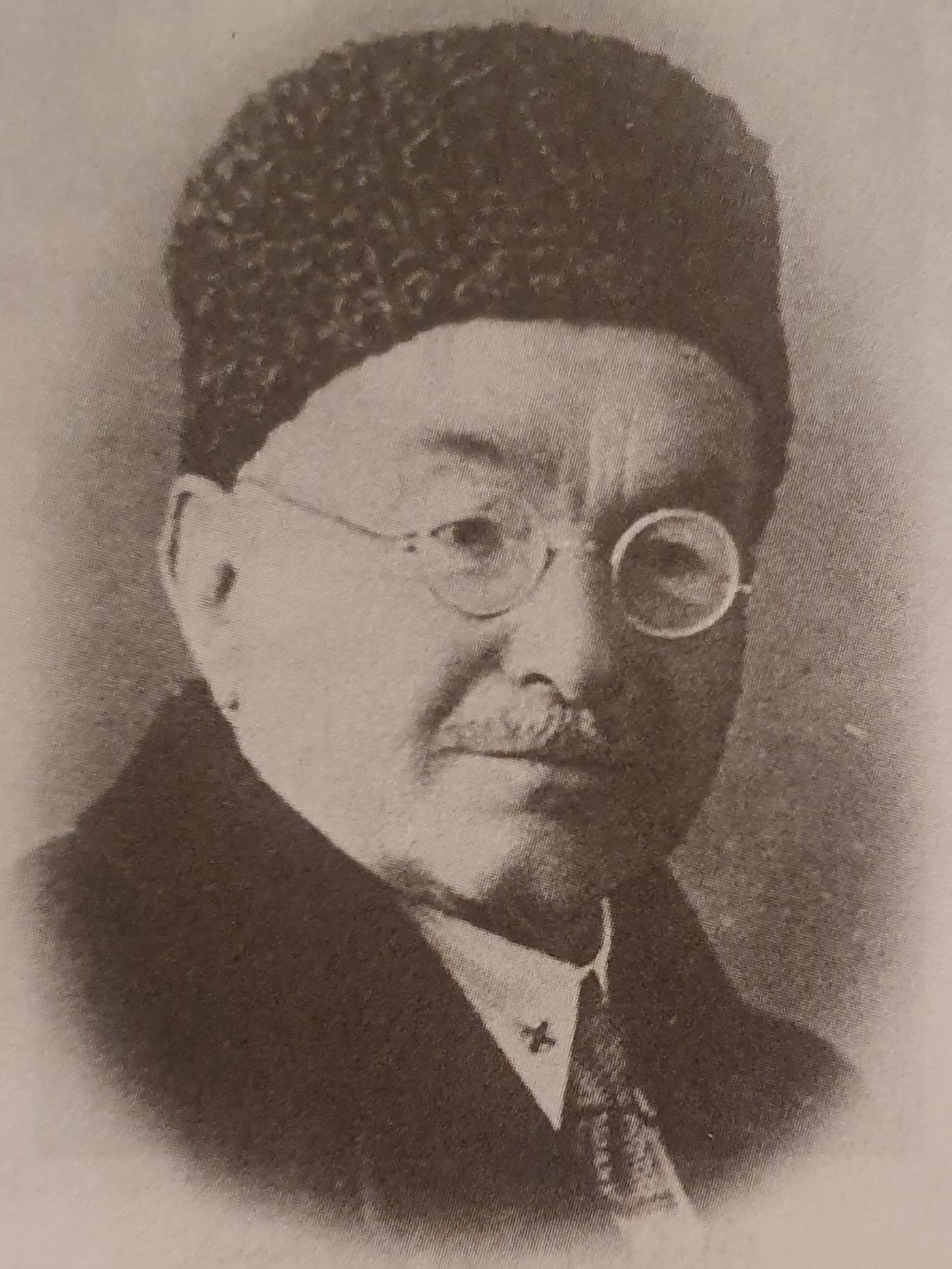
- Born: 2 December 1854; Shusha, Russian Empire
- Died: 20 December 1929 (aged 75); Shusha, Azerbaijan SSR, USSR
- Occupations: Therapeutist, surgeon
- Spouse: Princess Zari Qajar
- Relatives: Samad bey Mehmandarov
- Awards: Order of St. Anna 3rd class (1878); Order of St. Stanislaus 2nd class (1880); Order of St. Anna 2nd class (1897); Order of St. Vladimir 4th class (1911)

Abdul Karim bey Mirza Mustafa bey oghlu Mehmandarov (Azerbaijani: Əbdül Kərim bəy Mirzə Mustafa bəy oğlu Mehmandarov, 2 December 1854 – 20 December 1929) was a Russian and Soviet medical doctor of Azerbaijani ethnicity. He was one of the first ethnic Azerbaijanis to graduate from the Medico-Surgical Academy in St. Petersburg, one of the leaders of the Shusha educational society "Neshr Maarif", founder of the first Russian-Azerbaijani Shusha school for girls.

== Early life ==
He was born in 1854 in Shusha, as a member of the Azerbaijani noble family Mehmandarovs. His father Mirza Mustafa was an Imperial Russian officer, while his grandfather Mirza Ali was a mehmandar (an official courier appointed to escort an important traveller) of Ibrahim Khalil Khan, the origin of the surname. He graduated from Baku Gymnasium (1872) and St. Petersburg Medical-Surgical Academy (1877), then worked in a military hospital during Russo-Turkish War (1877–1878) and combated diphtheria outbreak in Poltava Guberniya. He later served in 162nd Akhaltsikhe regiment as a doctor. Having returned to Azerbaijan in 1883, he continued his practice.

== Political activities ==
He was elected to head Shusha local committee of "Difai" - a secret Azerbaijani organization. Several Russian officers were assassinated under his commands - Shusha prosecutor Lunyakin, Elizabethpol police chief Bannikov and Tartar police chief Felikinski were all killed under his orders. He died in 1929 in Shusha.

== Family ==
He married had an affair with a Petersburger woman named Alexandra Dolganova who by then studied at the Women's Medical Courses with whom he had a son who would grow to be the famous doctor - Mikhail Tushinsky. He officially was married to Zarri Qajar (1864-1943), a daughter of Bahman Mirza in 1884 with whom he had 3 sons and 4 daughters:

1. Mikhail Tushinsky Mehmandarov (1882–1962) — married to Maria Zvyagina
2. Adil beg Mehmandarov (1885-1937) — married to Ziver Javanshir Beybutova
3. Rashid beg Mehmandarov (1885-1937) — married to Varvara .....dze
4. Surkhay beg Mehmandarov (1890-?) —
5. Turan Mehmandarova — married to Fatulla beg Rustambegov
6. Kubra Mehmandarova — married to Bala beg Taghi-zadeh
7. Nushaba Mehmandarova — married to Shahbaz beg Rustambegov
8. Zahra Mehmandarova (1985-1957) — married to firstly to Azad beg Vazirov, then Jumshud beg Vazirov
9. Mahbuba Mehmandarova (1902-1976) — married to Shamil Mahmudbekov

Through his daughter Mahbuba he is great-grandfather of Eldar Azizov - current Mayor of Baku.

== Legacy ==
The Central Hospital and a street in Shusha, Azerbaijan are named after him.
