= Mammadbeyov =

Mamedbekov (Azerbaijani: Məmmədbəyov; Russian: Мамедбеков) is a masculine surname, of Azerbaijani origin. The feminine counterpart name is Mammadbeyova. The name consists of three elements: Mammad, a reduced form of the male name Mahammad; bey, a title of a chief or a landowner; and the Russian ending -ov. It is the name of a noble family of Azerbaijan.

== People with the surname Mamedbekov/a ==
They Were the First:

- Kamal Mamedbekov (1924–1997), architect and researcher (academic of International Academy of EC, professor, PhD in Theory and History of Architecture and Restoration of Architectural Monuments), the first academic researcher and expert in urban planning to conduct scientific research specifically on the architectural and urban planning development of Sumgait, the first academic secretary of the Scientific and Methodological Council for the Protection of Monuments under the Presidium of the Academy of Sciences and was a recognized expert in heritage protection and one of the first honored architects of Azerbaijan.

 Kamal Mamedbekov – father of Oktay Mamedbekov and Gulnara Mehmandarova, brother of Leyla Mamedbekova.

- Leyla Mamedbekova (scientist) (1922–2006), physician and researcher (professor, PhD in Medicine), the first female professor in Azerbaijan specializing in pathology, the first female forensic medical expert and the first female chief pathologist of Azerbaijan.

 Leyla Mamedbekova – sister of Kamal Mamedbekov.

- Oktay Mamedbekov (born 1956), drilling engineer and researcher (professor, PhD in Technical Sciences. The youngest Doctor of Sciences and professor in this field in Azerbaijan. Author of numerous patents for inventions, with officially recognized and protected intellectual property rights.

 Oktay Mamedbekov – son of Kamal Mamedbekov.

- Gulnara Mamedbekova (name at birth), now Gulnara Mehmandarova (born 1959), architect and researcher (professor, PhD in Theory and History of Architecture and Restoration of Architectural Monuments), first President of ICOMOS (UNESCO) Azerbaijan.

 Gulnara Mehmandarova – daughter of Kamal Mamedbekov.

== People with the surname Mammadbeyov/a ==
They Were the First:

- Leyla Mammadbeyova, first female pilot of Southern Europe and the Middle East.
- Rashid Mammadbeyov, first Olympic medal winner from Azerbaijan.

- Heybatgulu Mammadbeyov, Azerbaijan's tax minister in 1919–1920.
- Karim Mammadbeyov, Dagestani statesman of the 1920s and 1930s.
- Lutfi Mammadbeyov, actor, screenwriter, artistic director of films.

== See also ==
- Mammad, name list
