= Grigol Uratadze =

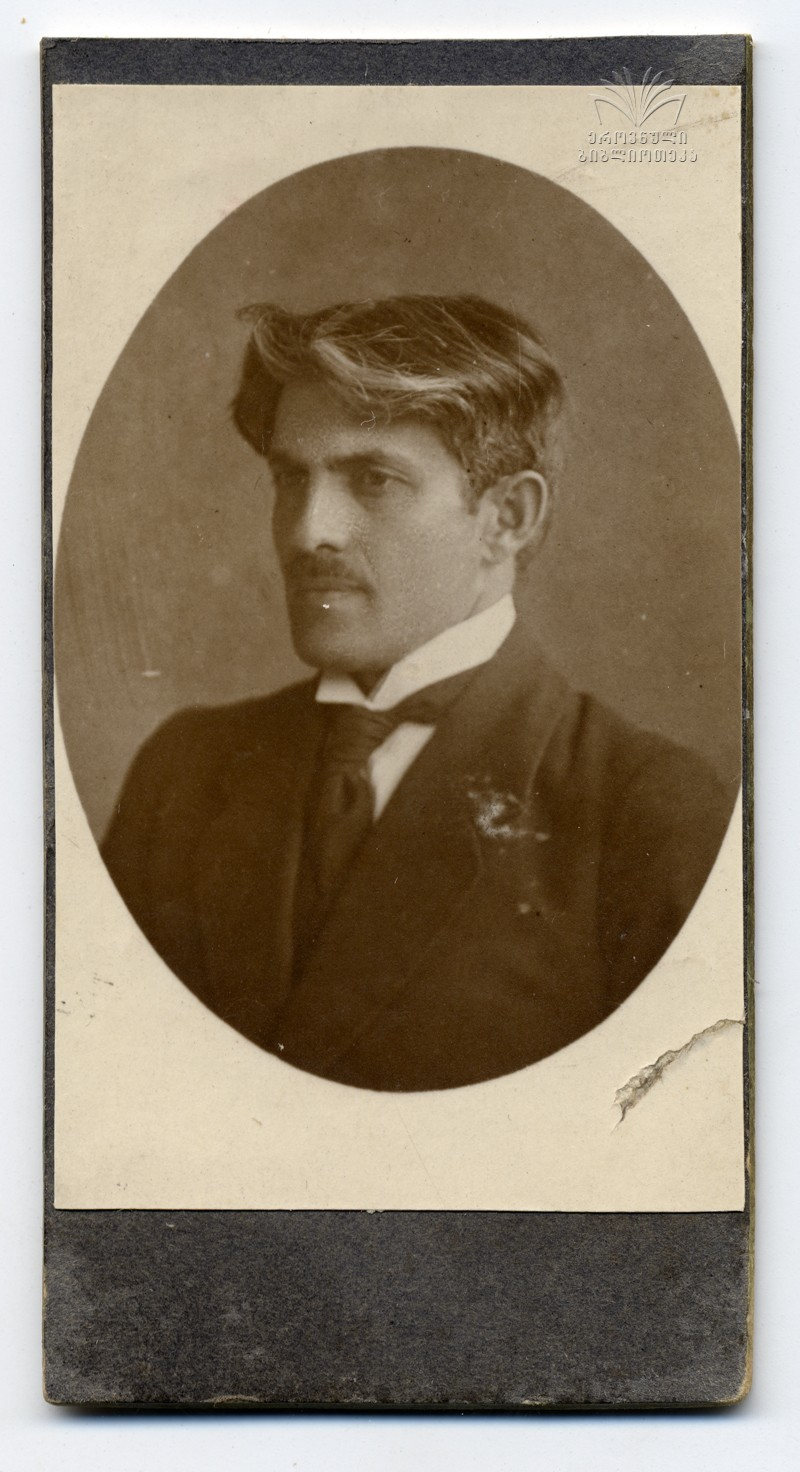

Grigol "Grisha" Uratadze (Georgian: გრიგოლ "გრიშა" ურატაძე) (10 February 1878 – 12 February 1959) was a Georgian Social Democratic politician, diplomat and author. His name is also spelled Grégoire Ouratadze in a French manner.

Uratadze was born in Atsana in the Ozurget Uyezd (modern Guria).

In 1912, Uratadze, together with Vlasa Mgeladze, was part of the Georgian delegation to Vienna, where Leon Trotsky organized his short-lived union of social democratic factions as an alternative to Lenin's narrow notion of party unity. A close associate of Noe Zhordania, he figured prominently in the development of Menshevism in Georgia and took an active part in the establishment of an independent republic of Georgia in 1918. As a Georgian plenipotentiary in Moscow, he signed a 7 May 7, 1920 treaty with Soviet Russia in which Georgia's independence was de jure recognized. The Red Army invasion of Georgia in 1921 forced him into exile to France, where he authored several monographs and numerous articles on the revolutionary movement in Georgia and the Soviet nationalities policy.
