= Sona Mehmandarova =

- Born: 1894; Lankaran
- Died: After 1966; Baku
- Occupation: model

Sona Mehmandarova (1894 in Lankaran — after 1966, Baku) was an Azerbaijani woman who won a world-renowned beauty contest in 1912. She was also a laureate of beauty competitions organized in the Russian Empire.

== Early life ==
Sona Mehmandarova was born in 1894 (or 1896) in Lankaran. She was the daughter of Naghi bey Mehmandarov, the brother of Samad bey Mehmandarov, the Minister of Defense of the Azerbaijan Democratic Republic. Her mother, Bika khanum, was the daughter of ensign Abulfet khan Talishinsky. Naghi bey, who was the city chief of Lankaran, was one of the first Azerbaijani intellectuals educated in Europe at the time. He wanted Sona to receive an education as well, so she attended a gymnasium. She learned French and Russian languages to a proficient level from private tutors.

Due to Sona Mehmandova's exceptional beauty, suitors frequently came to the house. Her father, Naghi bey, prioritized her education and rejected the marriage proposals. One of the rejected suitors, Ahmad bey Zeynalov, killed Naghi bey in 1910 and threw his body into the sea. Naghi bey's servant witnessed the incident, and the matter was uncovered. The murderers were exiled to Siberia.

== Beauty competitions ==
After her father's death, her mother sent Sona to Baku to stay with relatives. In 1912, at the insistence of her relatives, she participated in a beauty contest held at the "Obshchestvennoye sobraniye" building (now the Azerbaijan State Academic Philharmonic Hall). After winning this contest, Sona entered another competition in Tbilisi, where she was awarded the title of "Pearl of the Caucasus." Following Tbilisi, she traveled to Saint Petersburg and won the "Miss Russia" contest there. At the end of 1912, Sona won an internationally significant contest in Paris, earning the title of "World Beauty" and the "Grand Prix," gaining worldwide fame. After this victory, Sona could not return to Baku or Lankaran and began living in Saint Petersburg. A year after the contest, in 1913, she married Uruzov, a man of Dagestani origin. Although her family did not approve of this marriage, Sona did not separate from Uruzov.

== Soviet era ==
After the Russian Revolution, the Bolsheviks, who seized power, converted private properties in the country into state property. As a result, Sona's family became impoverished. Despite the establishment of the Azerbaijan Democratic Republic, where her uncle, Samad bey Mehmandarov served as the Minister of Defense, she did not return to Azerbaijan. Soon, the Bolsheviks also occupied Azerbaijan. During this period, several prominent families, including the Mehmandarovs and Talishkhanovs, faced persecution. In such circumstances, Sona moved to Moscow under the patronage of Anatoly Lunacharsky, the People's Commissar for Education of the RSFSR, and lived there throughout the 1920s. In the 1930s, when the repressions intensified, she burned all documents and photos that indicated she was from the Mehmandarov family.

== Afterlife and death ==
Many years later, in 1966, Mehmandarova returned to Baku, and a few years later, she died due to illness. Although her body was buried in one of the cemeteries in Baku, the exact location of her grave is unknown.
