= Vakhtang Kikabidze =

Georgian musician and politician (1938–2023)

- ვახტანგ კიკაბიძე
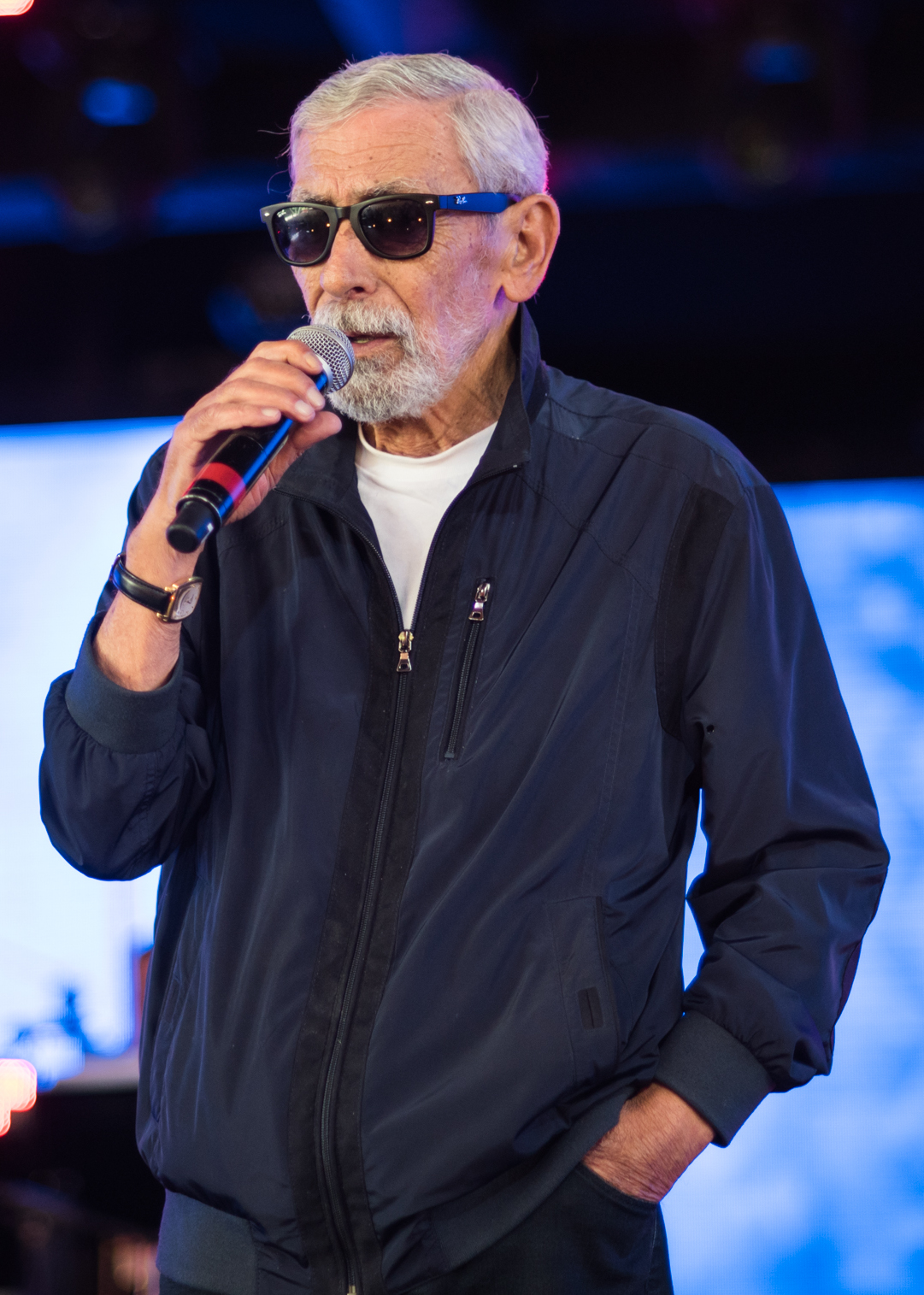
- Kikabidze in 2017

Member of the Parliament of Georgia
- In office 11 December 2020 – 15 January 2023

Personal details
- Born: 19 July 1938 Tbilisi, Georgian SSR, Soviet Union
- Died: 15 January 2023 (aged 84) Tbilisi, Georgia
- Party: United National Movement
- Profession: Actor, singer
- Awards

Vakhtang Konstantines dze Kikabidze (Georgian: ვახტანგ კონსტანტინეს ძე კიკაბიძე; 19 July 1938 – 15 January 2023), also known as Buba (Georgian: ბუბა), was a Georgian actor, singer-screenwriter, producer, composer and politician who served in the Parliament of Georgia from 2020 until his death.

== Personal life ==
Vakhtang Kikabidze was born on 19 July 1938 in Tbilisi, the then-capital of Soviet Georgia. His father Konstantin was born into a noble family in Kartli, while his mother was Manana Bagration-Davitashvili, a descendant of King Alexander I of Kakheti. At just 4 years old, he lost his father, who went missing during the 1942 Battle of the Kerch Peninsula. From 1959 to 1965, he studied at the Tbilisi State University, with second courses in 1961–1963 at the Institute of Foreign Languages of Tbilisi.

Vakhtang Kikabidze was married to Irina Kebadze until her death in 2021. Together, they had one son, Konstantin, and two grandsons, Vakhtang Jr. (Vato) and Ioane. Vakhtang's wife had a daughter named Marina from a previous marriage to her first husband Guram Sagaradze.

=== Death ===
Kikabidze died on 15 January 2023, at the age of 84, from complications from kidney failure. Practically the entire city of Tbilisi and representatives from many other countries, including diplomats and government officials came to bid their final farewells. Thousands of people walked along his coffin, which was draped with the Georgian and Ukrainian flags, from the Philarmonic Concert Hall to the Vera Cemetery, his songs blaring from loudspeakers and people standing on their balconies and clapping.

== Career ==
=== As a singer ===
While still a student, Vakhtang Kikabidze, whose nickname from childhood was Buba, joined the Tbilisi Philharmonic. In 1967, he became a soloist at the Orera ensemble, a Georgian vocal group that was registered in 1958 as the first-ever Vocal-Instrumental Ensemble in the Soviet Union. By the 1980s, he had become an acclaimed singer across the USSR, releasing the Poet Vakhtang Kikabidze EP in 1979 and his first Russian-language album, While the heart sings ("Пока сердце поёт") in 1981, followed by The Wish later that year. His 1985 Love Melody ("Мелодия Любви") gained international praise.

Since the fall of the Soviet Union, Buba had remained a popular musician in the Russian-speaking world, regularly holding concerts in Russia (until 2008), Belarus, Ukraine, Azerbaijan and other countries of the former Soviet bloc. At times, his concerts have been held with financing from the Georgian government. His 2010 concert in Minsk was controversial as it took place in the midst of violent crackdowns by the Lukashenko regime in the aftermath of a disputed presidential election. While he had cut off his ties with Russia following the 2008 Russo-Georgian War, he said "missing the Russian audience". He had inspired several younger singers, including the Georgian-born Valery Meladze.

==== Discography ====
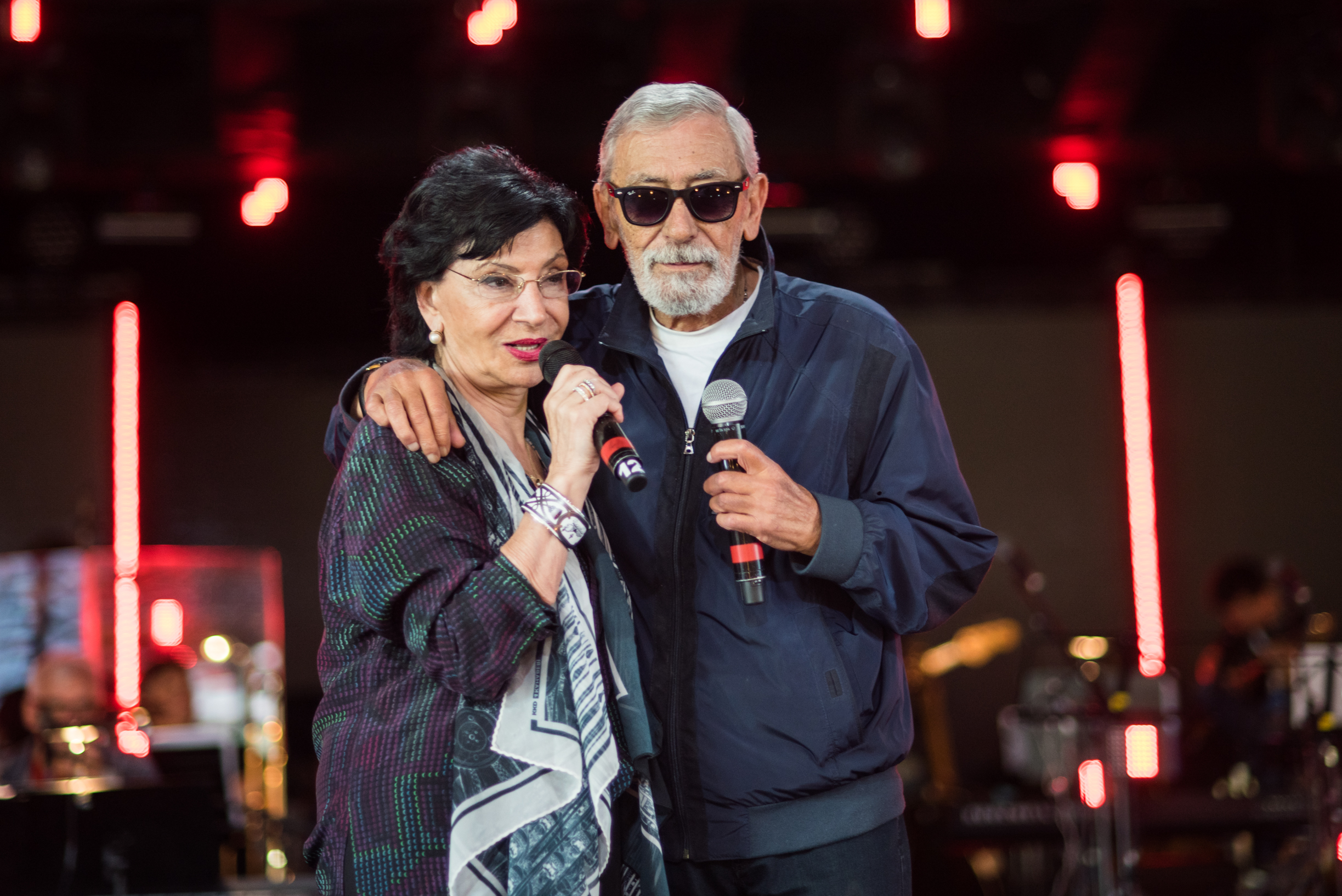
Buba and Georgian singer Nani Bregvadze in 2017

- Pismo drugu. BUBA Records, 1999
- Sekret Schastya. BUBA Records, 1999
- Tango Lyubvi. OST-Records, 1999
- Luchshie pesni. Noks Myuzik 2001
- Grand Collection. Kvadro-Disk, 2002
- Moi goda. Russkoie snabshenie 2003
- Stariki-pazboiniki. Super Music 2004
- Lyubownoye nastroyenie. Nikitin, 2005

=== As an actor ===
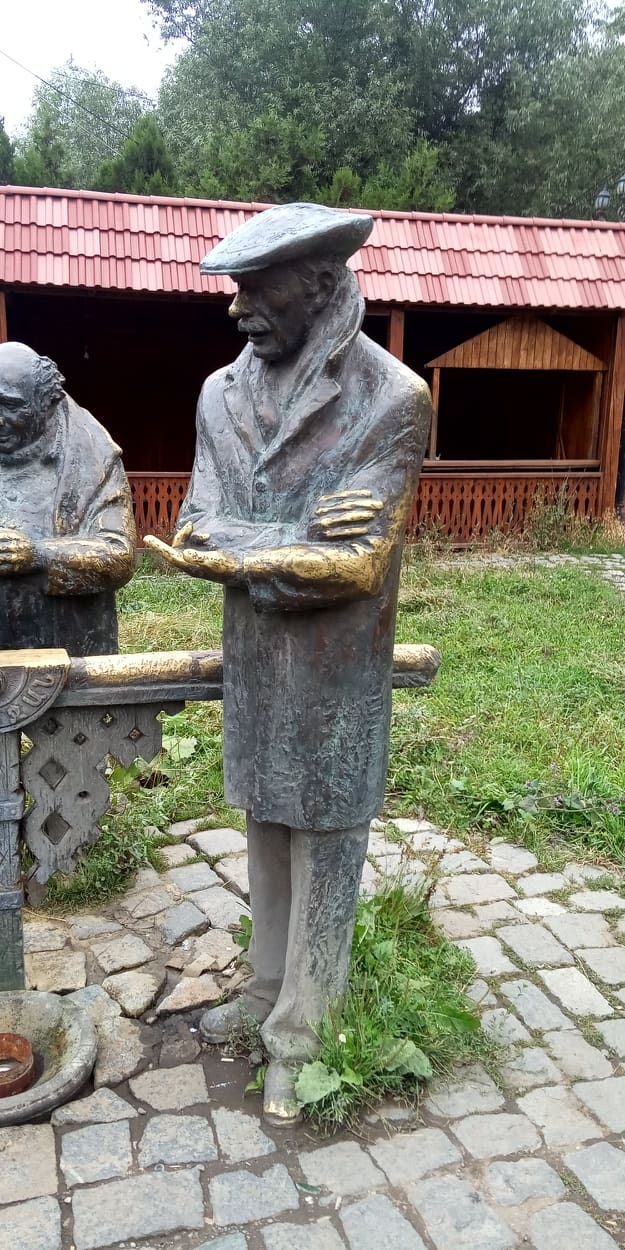
Statue of Mimino in Armenia

In the late 1960s, Buba rose to fame as an actor in the Soviet movie industry, focusing his work on Georgian Soviet movies, though he played in several Russian movies as well, including Don't Grieve (1969), for which he was awarded best performance of a male role at the 1970 film festival "Cartakhan-70", and Hopelessly Lost (1972). His most famous role was as Mimino in the eponymous 1977 movie, a helicopter pilot dreaming of piloting Tu-144. The movie would become an iconic motion picture in the Soviet world and received several national and international awards. Buba became a household name in Georgia and Russia with movies like Melodies of the Vere Neighborhood (1974) and the miniseries TASS Is Authorized to Declare... (1984). In 1999, his star was opened in Moscow's Star Square. His last film, Fortune (Fortuna), was directed by the famous Georgian and Soviet film director Georgi Daneliya in 2000.

==== Filmography ====
- "Ku! Kin-dza-dza" (Ku! Kin-dza-dza) – Russia, 2013
- "Fortune" (Fortuna) – Russia, 2000
- "Real Men and the Others" (Mamakatsebi) – Georgian SSR, 1985
- "Olga and Konstantin" (Olga i Konstantin) – Russian SFSR, 1984
- "TASS Is Authorized to Declare..." (TASS upolnomochen zayavit...) – Russian SFSR, 1984
- "Morning Without Marks" (Utro bez otmetok) – Russian SFSR, 1983
- "Cheers, My Dear!" (Itsotskhle genatsvale) – Georgian SSR, 1981
- "Till Next Time, Friend..." (Shekhvedramde, megobaro...) – Georgian SSR, 1980
- "Mimino" – Russian SFSR, 1977
- "The Lost Expedition" (Propavshaya ekspeditsiya) – Russian SFSR, 1974
- "Melodies of the Vere Quarter" (Veris ubnis melodiebi) – Georgian SSR, 1974
- "Hopelessly Lost" (Sovsem propashchiy) – Russian SFSR, 1972
- "I'm a Detective" (Me, gamomdziebeli) – Georgian SSR, 1971
- "Don't Grieve" (Ar daidardo, Ne goryuy) – Georgian SSR/Russian SFSR, 1969
- "Orera, Full Forward)" (Orera, sruli svlit) – Georgian SSR, 1967
- "Meeting in Mountains" (Shekhvedra mtashi) – Georgian SSR, 1966

=== As a screenwriter ===
As a screenwriter and director, Kikabidze produced two feature films: Be Well, Dearest One (Bud' zdorov dorogoj), which received the top award at the International Comedy Festival in Gabrovo, Bulgaria, and Men and All Others (Muzhchiny i vse ostal'nye).

==== Filmography ====
- "Cheers, My Dear!" (Itsotskhle genatsvale) – Georgian SSR, 1981
- "Real Men and the Others" (Mamakatsebi) – Georgian SSR, 1985

=== Political views ===
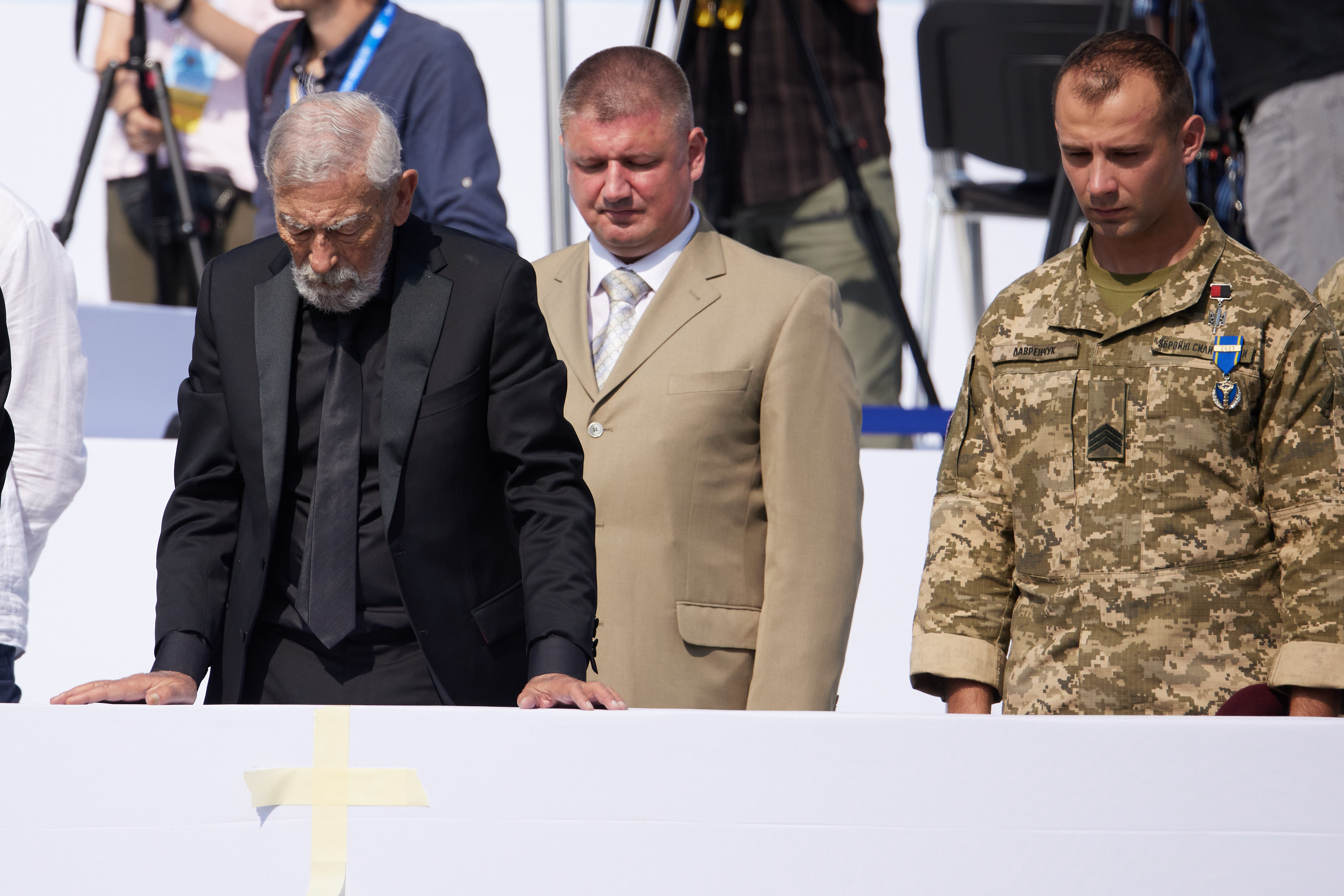
Buba Kikabidze at an Independence Day parade in Ukraine

Already during the Soviet Union, Buba Kikabidze was one of the rare public figures to make critical statements against the Communist government. In 1989, he recorded a song along with other famous singers in solidarity with the victims of the 9 April tragedy. As a public figure in Georgia, he regularly endorsed the United National Movement and voiced campaign ads for the party during the 2008 parliamentary election. He told Russian media that he voted for Mikheil Saakashvili. During the 2019 anti-Russian protests in Tbilisi that resulted in the violent dispersal of demonstrators by law enforcement, he declared standing with the protestors.

Although Buba had been a famous figure in Russian culture, he cut off all ties with the country in the aftermath of the 2008 Russo-Georgian War. During the conflict, he rejected the Order of Friendship bestowed upon him in July 2008 by President Dmitry Medvedev and canceled the concert dedicated to his 70th birthday which was to be held at the Kremlin as a protest against Russia's actions. He claimed to be a persona non grata in Russia and was supported by several Russian artists, including Mikhail Kozakov, Oleg Basilashvili, and Valery Meladze. Following the war, he performed the song You Disappointed Me in which he sings,

You haven't betrayed me. You've disappointed me.

According to the artist, the song was not addressed to the Russian government but to the Russian intelligentsia which he believed was to blame for failing to come to the help of Georgia. He had stated he would return to perform in Russia "only once last Russian boot would leave Georgian soil".

Buba Kikabidze was a supporter of the 2014 Euromaidan protests in Ukraine and a close friend of former Ukrainian President Viktor Yushchenko. President Volodymyr Zelenskyy called Buba a "role model" and invited him to his 2019 inauguration.

=== Political career ===
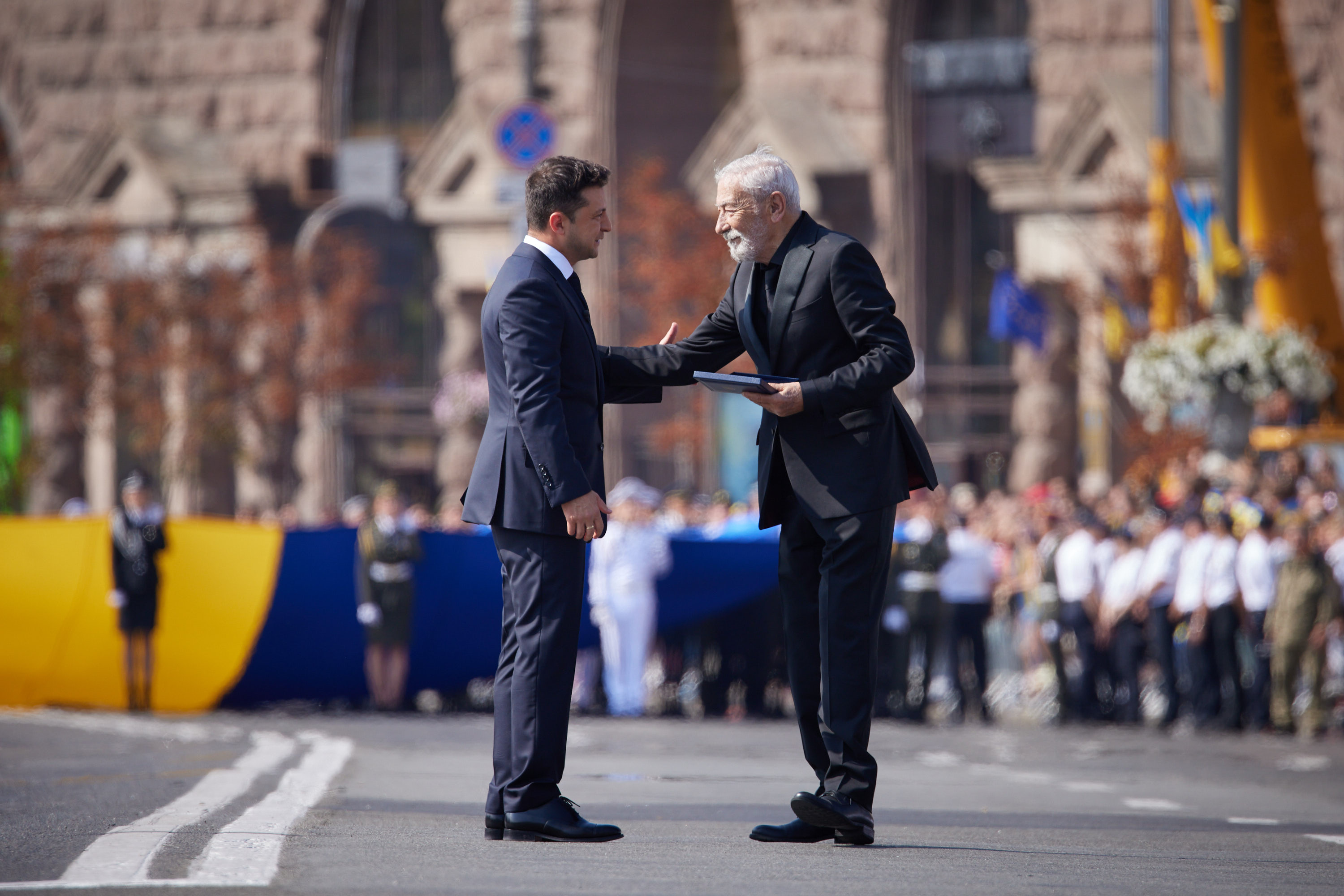
Buba receives the Order of Prince Yaroslav the Wise in 2021

During the 2020 parliamentary election, Vakhtang Kikabidze was nominated as head of the electoral list of Strength Is in Unity, an electoral bloc led by the United National Movement and including several opposition parties. The choice was controversial, with former Speaker David Usupashvili claiming the choice made "little sense since he would not be involved in the [bloc's] policy-making" and Prime Minister Giorgi Gakharia calling him "old like the ideas [the opposition] supports", a statement criticized as an example of ageism. Former President Mikheil Saakashvili, the bloc's prime ministerial candidate, endorsed the choice, calling him "a great Georgian patriot", while influential UNM MP Tinatin Bokuchava called him a "symbol of patriotism". Though Saakashvili called him a "talented politician", Kikabidze himself said his candidacy did not mean he was "entering politics" and added an UNM-led government could "use him" to rebuild ties with Russia. During the campaign, Buba caused controversy for singing a verse of the Georgian song Tbiliso in Russian during a campaign rally, something he justified with his desire "to let everyone know how beautiful Georgia is."

Winning a seat in Parliament, he was one of 49 MPs that refused to recognize the election results after allegations of mass voter fraud surfaced and declared a boycott. He remained nonetheless active in politics and was present at the UNM headquarters when law enforcement stormed it in February 2021 to arrest party chairman Nika Melia. He ended his boycott in May 2021 after a short-lived EU-facilitated agreement between Georgian Dream and the opposition and since then served as a member of the Culture Committee. The senior member of Parliament, he has never voted since entering the legislature.

In a speech during the Petra Summit between the leaders of Association Trio, Ukrainian President Zelenskyy congratulated Kikabidze on his 83rd birthday and invited him to Kyiv. He was in Kyiv on 24 August, where he was awarded the Order of Prince Yaroslav the Wise by Zelenskyy, one day after the latter awarded Georgia's Prime Minister Irakli Gharibashvili the Order of Merit. Kikabidze was critical of the Georgian government over its treatment of Mikheil Saakashvili, in prison since October 2021, supporting his release and return to Ukraine. In November, he met with Zelenskyy to lobby for his intervention and made a public appeal to Bidzina Ivanishvili, the Russia-tied businessman and founder of the ruling Georgian Dream party.

== Awards ==
Buba Kikabidze held several awards from Georgia, Russia, and Ukraine. He had been a People's Artist of Georgia since 1980, entitling him to a lifetime pension from the state and has been acknowledged by a number of various music contests and film festivals in the former USSR. He was awarded the Lifetime Achievement Award at the Batumi Film Festival of 2017. He also held the USSR State Prize, the Order of King Vakhtang Gorgasali, as well as of Nikolai Wondermonger and Knight Cross of St. Konstantin the Great.

He became an honorary citizen of Tbilisi in 1999. In 2013, he was awarded the Shota Rustaveli Prize by President Saakashvili. In 2014, he was named "Man of the Year" in Ukraine and awarded by former President Yushchenko.
