= Revaz Gabashvili =

Revaz Gabashvili (Georgian: რევაზ გაბაშვილი; November 6, 1882 – 1969) was a Georgian politician and writer involved in the independence movement and revolutionary journalism in the early 20th century.

Gabashvili was born of a noble family in Tiflis (Tbilisi). His mother was the popular writer Ekaterine Gabashvili. He abandoned his studies at the Montefiore Institute in Liège, Belgium, in 1905 to return to Georgia and take part in the revolution against the Russian rule. Briefly fleeing police persecution to Paris, he returned in 1907 and enrolled in the University of St. Petersburg, from where he was excluded on charges of being involved in students’ disorders in 1910. On his return to Georgia, Gabashvili engaged in opposition journalism; he founded and edited the newspaper klde (კლდე; "Rock"). A group of Georgians collaborating with klde formed the nucleus around which the Georgian National Democratic Party organized. The party held its founding congress in June 1917, in the aftermath of the 1917 February Revolution in St. Petersburg. After Georgia’s declaration of independence (May 26, 1918), Gabashvili was elected to the Constituent Assembly for the National Democratic Party. The 1921 Red Army invasion of Georgia forced Gabashvili into exile to Paris where he wrote for local press on the politics and society of Georgia and the book L’apport de la race caucasienne dans la civilisation mondiale (Paris, 1967). His resonant memoirs რაც მახსოვს (rats’ maxsovs; "What I Remember") – published in Munich in 1959 – was highly critical of the Social Democratic leadership whom Gabashvili accused of incompetence and inability to respond Georgians’ national demands.
