= Vlasa Mgeladze =

Georgian and Persian revolutionary (1868-1943)

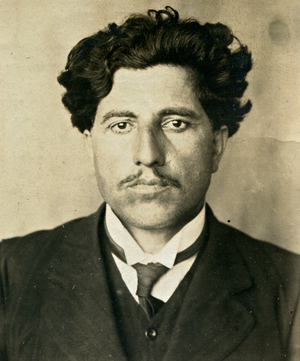
Vlasa Mgeladze

Vlasa Mgeladze (Georgian: ვლასა მგელაძე; Russian: Власа Джарисманович Мгеладзе, Vlasa Dzharismanovich Mgeladze), alias Tria (Russian: Триа) (1868 – 1943), was a Georgian social democratic revolutionary and a Bolshevik-turned-Menshevik also known as a participant of the Persian Constitutional Revolution, of which he wrote a valuable account.

== Biography ==
Born into the Georgian noble Mgeladze family, Vlasa was an active participant of the Russian Revolution of 1905 and the Persian Constitutional Revolution. In 1910, he authored a special report “The Caucasian Social-Democrats in the Persian Revolution” which was sent to the 12th International Socialist Congress in Copenhagen at Lenin's urgent request. The report was published in 1910–1911 in Paris and then republished in 1925. His complete memoirs were published in Paris in 1974.

In 1912, Mgeladze, together with Grigol Uratadze, was part of the Georgian delegation to Vienna, where Leon Trotsky organized his short-lived union of social democratic factions as an alternative to Lenin's narrow notion of party unity. After the 1917 October Revolution which swept the Bolsheviks to power, Mgeladze withdrew into energetic opposition to Lenin and returned to his native Georgia, where he became involved in the politics of the independent Democratic Republic of Georgia whose government made him a commissar for the People's Guard of Georgia. The 1921 invasion by the Soviet Russian army forced Mgeladze into exile to France, where he died in 1943.
