= Rezo Lagidze =

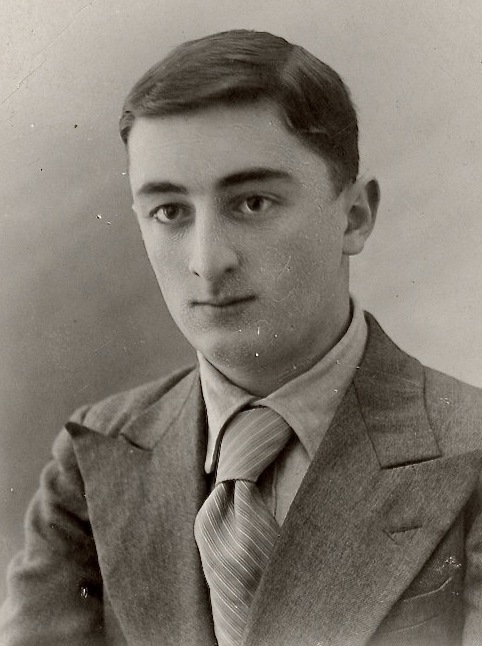
- Lagidze in his youth
- Born: July 10, 1921; Baghdati
- Died: October 16, 1981 (aged 60); Tbilisi
- Era: 20th century
- Awards: Shota Rustaveli Prize (1975)

Revaz Ilias dze Lagidze (Georgian: რევაზ ლაღიძე; July 10, 1921 – October 16, 1981), known professionally as Rezo Lagidze, was a 20th-century Georgian composer. Recognized as the People's Artist of the Georgian SSR (1961) and a laureate of the USSR State Prize, he wrote a variety of compositions ranging from opera to symphonic works and film scores. Lagidze's notable compositions include his 1973 opera "Lela" and the "Song about Tbilisi", which remains popular in Georgia and Russia to this day.

== Biography ==
Lagidze was born on July 10, 1921, in the Imereti region of Georgia, which had been occupied by Bolshevik Russia a few months prior.

In 1939, he graduated from the 4th Tbilisi Music School, where he studied violin. Throughout the 1940s, he played violin at the Georgian State Symphony Orchestra and then radio.

In 1948, Lagidze graduated from the Tbilisi Conservatory, where he studied composition under Andria Balanchivadze.

Throughout the 1950s and 1960s, Lagidze wrote music for more than 30 films. He authored numerous ballads for Georgian pop singers of his time, such as Lily Gegelia.

In 1973, Lagidze completed the opera "Lela", which touched upon Georgian historical themes and earned him the state prize of the Georgian SSR.

Through the end of his life, Lagidze taught music, being the head of the music department at the Tbilisi Pedagogical Institute and an instructor for the state symphony orchestra.

Lagidze died in 1981 and was interred at the Didube Pantheon.

== Filmography ==
Lagize produced music for dozens of well-known Georgian and Soviet films of the mid 20th century.

== Bibliography ==
- ახმეტელი მ., რევაზ ლაღიძე, "საბჭოთა ხელოვნება", 1976, No. 7;
- Орджоникидзе Г. Ш.,Реваз Лагидзе, წგნ.: Советская музыка, М., 1956;
- Торадзе Г. Г., Творения щедрого дара, «Советская музыка», 1976, No. 5;
- ქართული საბჭოთა ენციკლოპედია, ტ. 6, თბ., 1983. — გვ. 146–147.
- ზ. ბაბუნაშვილი, თ. ნოზაძე, "მამულიშვილთა სავანე", გვ. 232, თბ., 1994
