= Tsira Kurashvili =

- ცირა ყურაშვილი
- Born: May 1, 1962 (age 64); Baghdati, Georgia
- Citizenship: Georgia
- Education: Philology
- Alma mater: Akaki Tsereteli State University
- Occupations: Novelist, short story writer, poet
- Writing career
- Language: Georgian
- Years active: 1986
- Period: 1986
- Genres: Prose, Short story, poetry
- Subject: Andria Kurashvili
- Notable works: The Refugees at Kamani Monastery, 2011
- Notable awards: The International Poetry Competition award, 2016
- Literary movement: Metamodernism
- Website: armuri.georgianforum.com/t980-topic

Tsira Kurashvili (IPA: [tsʰiɾa qʼuɾaʃʷili]; Georgian: ცირა ყურაშვილი; born 1 May 1962) is a Georgian writer, poet, children's author and philologist.

== Biography ==
Tsira Kurashvili was born in Baghdati, Georgia, to the family of Lamara Chelidze and the founder of the Baghdati Museum, Elguja Kurashvili. She is the sister of the Georgian priest Andria Kurashvili, who was killed in July 1993, during the War in Abkhazia, particularly in the Kamani massacre.

She graduated from Akaki Tsereteli State University in 1979 as a philologist. During the period of 1986–1993, she worked for the literary magazine Gantiadi as the editorial proofreader, and later, as the head of a department.

In 2001, she initiated the publication Lile of poems for children by various poets.

In 2002, the short story "Don't Look Back" by Tsira Kurashvili was named "The best story of the year" by the literary newspaper Alternativa of the Caucasian House, and after this short story was included in the two-volume edition Woman, Image and Problems, published by the Caucasian House (2005).

In 2004, she co-founded the literary newspaper Enigma, which has been published as a magazine since 2006.

Kurashvili's poems, "Father", "Rabbi", "Mneddis on the Night of December" have been translated and published into the German anthology of Georgian poetry in 2015. In the same year Azerbaijanian Publishing house "ADK Publishing House" was published modern Georgian writers' collection of short stories named "A Man-ZERO", which also includes the short story by Tsira Kurashvili.

== Books ==
- Who Will Clear Away the Plates? (essays), Tbilisi, Intelecti, 2016
- At Playtime (Stories), Tbilisi, Intelecti, 2016, ISBN 978-9941-466-41-0
- The Paradise Window (poems), Saunje Publishing, 2013, ISBN 978-9941-442-54-4
- The Refugees at Kamani Monastery (Stories), Tbilisi, Intelecti, 2012, ISBN 978-9941-430-90-9
- Christesia (Fairy Tale, co-authored with Imeda Kurashvili), LLC "Encyclopedia" Kutaisi, 2009
- Alphabetic Period (poems), Kutaisi, 2006
- Asphalt Flowers (poems), Kutaisi, 1991

== Awards and honors ==
- Nominated Literary prize Saba for the short stories collection "The Refugees at Kamani Monastery", 2012
- The International Poetry Competition award with the poem "Father" (English translation by Eliso Pantskhava), 2014
