= Eter Tataraidze =

Georgian poet, folklorist and philologist

- Born: Eter Tataraidze; March 15, 1956 (age 70); Akhmeta municipality, Georgia
- Education: Philology
- Alma mater: Tbilisi State University
- Occupations: Poet, Essayist, Short story writer
- Spouse: Amiran Arabuli
- Relatives: Lela Tataraidze
- Writing career
- Language: Georgian
- Years active: 1984
- Period: 1984
- Genres: Poetry, Prose, Short story
- Notable works: As the bird chirrups, 2012
- Notable awards: The Saba literary prize, 2008
- Literary movement: Metamodernism
- Website: armuri.georgianforum.com/t41-topic

Eter Tataraidze (IPA: [etʰeɾ tʰatʰaɾaidze]; Georgian: ეთერ თათარაიძე; born 15 March 1956) is a Georgian poet, folklorist and philologist.

== Biography ==
Eter Tataraidze was born in Zemo Alvani, Akhmeta municipality, Georgia.

She graduated from Tbilisi State University in 1984 as a philologist. 1985–2006 she worked in the Department of Folklore by the Tbilisi State University.

Eter Tataraidze is the author of thirteen books, including six poetic collections.

She writes her poems one of Georgian dialects Tushetian (Tušuri, თუშური); because of this phenomenon Eter Tataraidze's poetry works have a special colour, as in the case of Frédéric Mistral, who wrote in a Provençal.

"Loyal to her creative principle, Eter Tataraidze writes in the dialect which seems to be the only means of expressing her thoughts, emotions and attitudes. Still, her lyrical language is different from her native Tushuri dialect which abounds in heroic poetry. The poems of the present collection are written in the everyday language which has no analogues in the otherwise rich Tushuri dialect. In this respect it is an untilled soil, a virgin land."

In 2007 she was awarded with a State Order of Honor.

In addition, Tataraidze is a winner of several prizes. Some of his works have been translated into English and Italian.

== Books ==
- Two, Three, Four (verses), Meridiani publishing, 2018
- It’s Our End!, Tbilisi, Intelecti publishing, 2016
- As the bird chirrups (verses), Tbilisi, Saunje publishing, 2012
- My father took his glory from the Lord God (non-fiction), Tbilisi, 'Erovnuli Mtserloba' publishing, 2008
- 100 Poems, Tbilisi, Intelecti publishing, 2012
- Agato (non-fiction), Tbilisi, Universali publishing, 2009
- Life Has Passed At Me (verses), Tbilisi, Lomisi publishing, 1988
- Horse-shoe of Moon (verses), Tbilisi, Merani publishing, 1988
- Hope Chamomile (verses), Tbilisi, Nakaduli publishing, 1979

== Awards and honors ==
- Ilia Chavchavadze prize of Georgian-European Institute of Paris for the book - „Graced from God‟ (1990);
- Literary Price Saba for the book „Remember Me With Mercy‟, 2008
- The Golden Wing prize, 2011
- Ilia Chavchavadze prize „Saguramo‟ – for poetry, 2012
- The folklore national prize in 2009.
- For the contribution to the popularisation and advancement of Georgian folklore, she was awarded with Zurab Tsereteli Prize

(2013).
