= Alexander Bagratovich Gruzinsky =

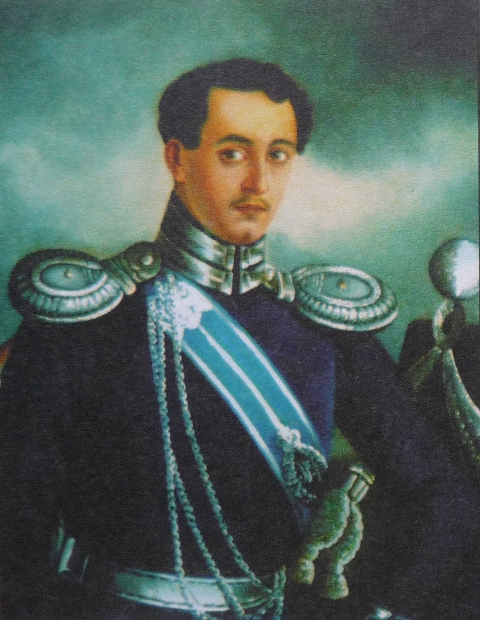

Head of the Royal House of Georgia
- Tenure: 8 May 1841 – 1865
- Predecessor: Bagrat Gruzinsky
- Successor: Pyotr Gruzinsky
- Born: 1820
- Died: 1865 (aged 44–45)
- Spouse: Princess Elene Tarkhan-Mouravi; Princess Ketevan Andronikashvili
- Issue: 9 children
Names
- Aleksandre Bagratis dze Bagrationi Gruzinsky
- House: Bagrationi dynasty
- Father: Prince Bagrat of Georgia
- Mother: Princess Ketevan Cholokashvili
- Religion: Georgian Orthodox Church

Prince Alexander (Georgian: ალექსანდრე), known in Russia as the tsarevich Alexander Bagratovich Gruzinsky (Russian: Александр Багратович Грузинский) (1820–1865) was a Georgian prince (batonishvili), a descendant of the Kartli-Kakhetian branch of Bagrationi dynasty, the former royal house of Georgia. Alexander was a son of Prince Bagrat of Georgia, the 4th son of king George XII of Georgia.

== Family ==
Prince Aleksandre (1820–1865) married firstly, in 1851, Princess Elena Tarkhan-Mouravi (7 July 1831 – 1903) and later divorced; and secondly married Princess Ekaterina (Ketevan) Andronikashvili.

He had 9 children from the first marriage:

1. Princess Ekaterine Gruzinskaya (born 1852).
2. Prince Bagrat Gruzinsky (born 1853).
3. Prince Ilia Gruzinsky (13 September 1854 – 4 August 1885).
4. Prince Pyotr Gruzinsky (26 April 1857 – 3 February 1922).
5. Prince Giorgi Gruzinsky (25 April 1858 – 1922).
6. Prince Mikheil Gruzinsky (10 February 1860 – 1935) married Princess Sofia Sumbatashvili (24 September 1869 – 4 October 1943)
  1. Prince Alexander Gruzinsky, Prince of Georgia (1894 – 18 November 1931) married in 1920 Princess Mariam Tumanishvili (1892–1943), with no issue.
  2. Princess Elene Gruzinskaya, Pss of Georgia (6 April 1896 – 8 June 1966) married in 1895 Prince Iesse Tsereteli (16 March 1894 – 1924).
  3. Prince Elizbar Gruzinsky, Prince of Georgia (1900-1926).
  4. Princess Nino Gruzinskaya, Princess of Georgia (1900 – 16 June 1974) married 1stly (div 1923) Prince Peter Mkheidze (21 December 1892 – 1972) and married 2ndly in 1923 Vano Gvelesiani.
7. Princess Sopio Gruzinskaya (1861–1863).
8. Prince Ivane Gruzinsky (born 1863).
9. Prince Levan Gruzinsky (1863–1864).

== Ancestry ==
Ancestors of Alexander Bagratovich Gruzinsky

16. Teimuraz II
8. Heraclius II of Georgia
17. Tamar of Kartli
4. George XII
18. Zaal Abashidze
9. Anna Abashidze
2. Prince Bagrat of Georgia
20. Jesse Andronikashvili
10. Papuna Andronikashvili
5. Ketevan Andronikashvili
1. Prince Alexander Bagration-Gruzinsky
6. Durmishkhan Cholokashvili
3. Ketevan Cholokashvili
