= Giorgi Tsabadze =

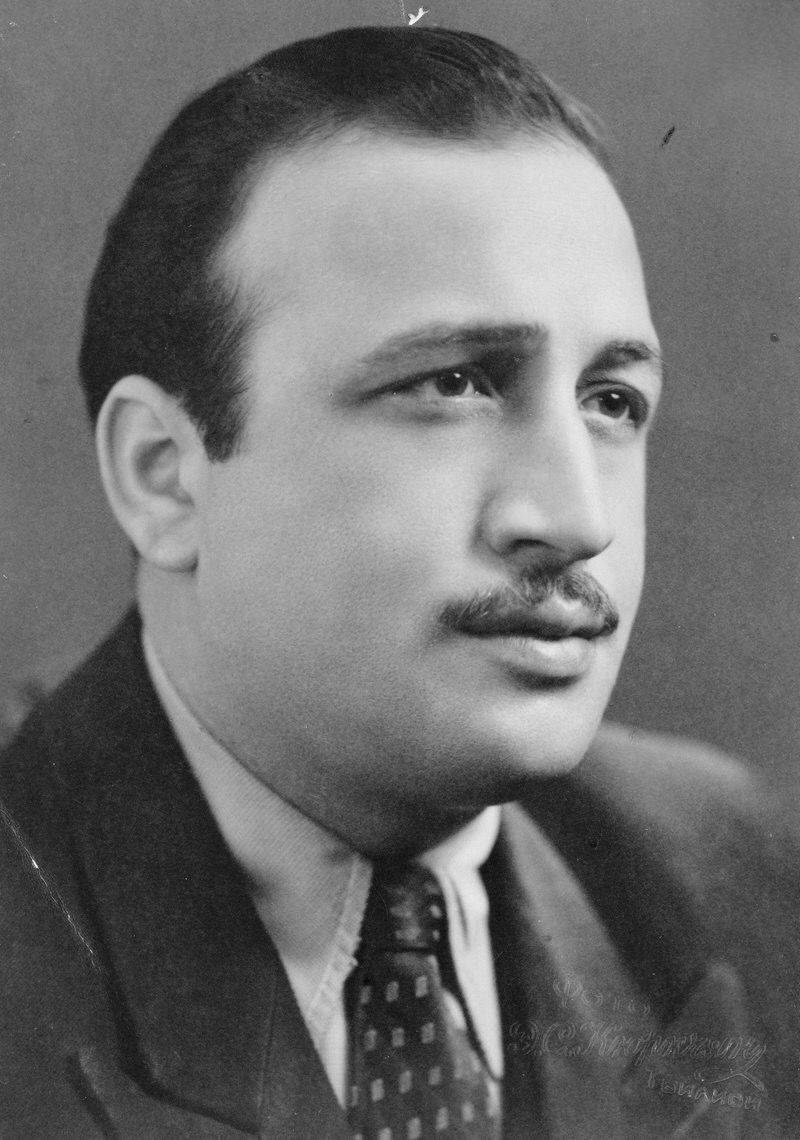
Giorgi Tsabadze

Giorgi Gabrielis dze Tsabadze (Georgian: გიორგი (გოგი) გაბრიელის ძე ცაბაძე) (b. August 24, 1924, Tbilisi — d. November 30, 1986, Gori), also known by his nickname Gogi Tsabadze, was a Georgian composer. Recognized as the People's Artist of the Georgian SSR (1973), he was one of the preeminent composers of the Georgian urban pop music.

== Biography ==
In 1956, Tsabadze graduated from the Tbilisi State Conservatory. From 1956 to 1975, he was a music department head at the Georgian Philharmonic.

Tsabadze became widely known for his songs: “Moon of Mtatsminda", "Kucha-Kucha", "Mephaitone" and many others. The composer's musicals are particularly noteworthy. His music features in the popular musical film "Melodies of Vera Quarter", among others.

Tsabadze died on stage, while singing. He is buried at the Didube Pantheon of Writers and Public Figures. There is a street named after him in Tbilisi.

== Bibliography ==
- Z. Babunashvili, T. Nozadze, "The Mamulishvili's Homeland", p. 391, Tbilisi, 1994
