= Mgeladze =

Mgeladze (Georgian: მგელაძე) is a Georgian surname. It literally means "son of a wolf". Notable people with the surname include:

- Akaki Mgeladze (1910–1980), Soviet politician
- Illarion Mgeladze (1890–1941), Georgian revolutionary
- Kesaria Mgeladze (born 2010), Georgian chess player
- Liya Mgeladze (b. 1926), Georgian noblewoman, second wife of Prince Petre Gruzinsky
- Tatia Mgeladze from musical group Trio Mandili
- Vlasa Mgeladze (1868-1943), Georgian and Persian revolutionary
