= Vasily Gabashvili =

Georgian military commander

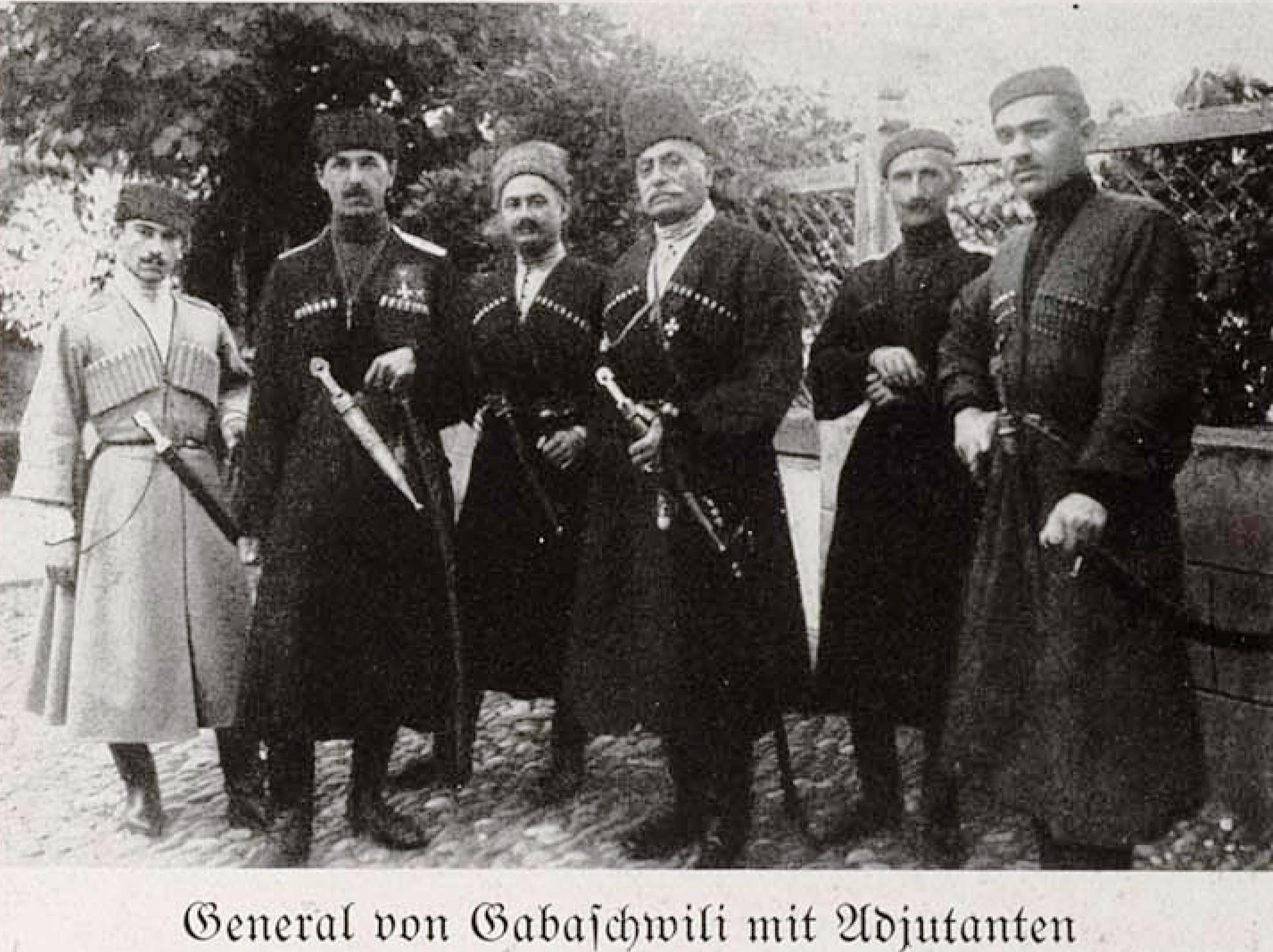
Vasily Gabashvili with aides in 1918

Vasily Gabashvili (Georgian: ვასილ გაბაშვილი), also known by his Russified name Vasily Davidovich Gabayev (Russian: Василий Давидович Габаев) (1853–1933) was a Georgian military commander in the service of the Russian Empire and the Democratic Republic of Georgia.

Of a noble family, Gabashvili served as an officer in the Imperial Russian army and took part in the 1877-78 war with the Ottoman Empire. He then fought in World War I and was promoted to lieutenant general in 1916. He served as a military commandant of Tiflis from 1916 until 1917 when he was appointed commander of the newly created Georgian Army Corps which provided a basis for a future national Georgian army. He retained a top military post during Georgia's short-lived independence (1918-1921), but retired after the Soviet takeover in 1921.
