= Jorge Bagration of Mukhrani =

Jorge de Bagration
- Prince of Georgia; Prince of Mukhrani

Head of the Royal House of Georgia (disputed)
- Tenure: 30 October 1977 – 16 January 2008
- Predecessor: Irakli Bagration of Mukhrani
- Successor: David Bagration of Mukhrani
- Born: 22 February 1944; Rome, Kingdom of Italy
- Died: 16 January 2008 (aged 63); Tbilisi, Georgia
- Burial: Svetitskhoveli Cathedral
- Spouse: María de las Mercedes Zornoza y Ponce de León; Nuria Llopis y Oliart
- Issue: María Antonieta Bagrationi-Mukhraneli; Irakli Bagrationi-Mukhraneli; David Bagration of Mukhrani; Ugo Bagration
- House: Mukhrani
- Father: Irakli Bagration of Mukhrani
- Mother: Maria Antonietta Pasquini dei Conti di Costafiorita
- Religion: Georgian Orthodox Church

Jorge de Bagration y de Mukhrani or Giorgi Bagration-Mukhraneli or George Bagration of Mukhrani (Georgian: გიორგი (ხორხე) ბაგრატიონ-მუხრანელი, romanized: giorgi (khorkhe) bagrat'ion-mukhraneli; 22 February 1944 – 16 January 2008) was a Spanish racing car driver of Georgian descent and a claimant to the headship of the Bagrationi dynasty and to the historical throne of Georgia.

== Early life ==
Jorge was born in Rome, Italy in 1944, the eldest son of émigré Prince Irakli Bagration-Mukhrani, head of the Mukhraneli branch of the Bagration royal family of Georgia. His father, Prince Irakli Bagration-Mukhrani, had gone into exile in Italy following the Bolshevik Revolution, but retained his claim to the throne of Georgia.

His Italian mother, Maria Antonietta Pasquini (1911–1944), daughter of Ugo, Count di Costafiorita, died giving birth to him. In 1946, the widowed Prince Irakli married Princess María de las Mercedes de Baviera y Borbón (1911–1953), daughter of Prince Ferdinand of Bavaria (who had been naturalised as a Spanish infante) and granddaughter of King Alfonso XII of Spain, thus bringing the Bagrationis into the marital and social orbit of the dynasties of Western Europe. Giorgi's cousin, Maria Vladimirovna, Grand Duchess of Russia is, like him, a royal pretender.

== Racing career ==
He started his motor sport career in 1959, firstly with motorcycles and from 1963 in cars, racing in various series. He made two attempts at Formula One, firstly at the 1968 Spanish Grand Prix with a Lola, but his entry was refused.

His second attempt to enter a Grand Prix was again in Spain, at the 1974 Spanish Grand Prix, but his efforts fell victim to a very unusual set of circumstances. He had bought a Surtees TS16 for this race, and he was included on the entry list. Unfortunately this entry list was mislaid as the outgoing president of the Spanish Motor Sport Federation cleared his office. When a new entry list was drawn up, in the light of some sponsorship problems that de Bagration was experiencing, he was omitted from it. Whether or not he would have been able to race with his reduced backing, he should still have been included on the list of entrants. Thus ended his hopes of competing at motor sport's highest level.

He turned later to rallying, and his best result was winning the Spanish Rally Championship in 1979 and 1981 with a Lancia Stratos HF. He retired from motor sport in 1982.

== Head of the Royal House of Georgia ==
Known as "Giorgi" in Georgia, the prince became a claimant to the Headship of the Georgian royal family in exile upon the death of his father on 30 October 1977, and as such used the style of Royal Highness. The House of Bagrationi is one of the oldest Christian dynasties in Europe, and reigned over the kingdom of Kartli and Kakheti until 1801, when Giorgi's ancestral realm was annexed to the Russian Empire by Tsar Alexander I of Russia in violation of the Treaty of Georgievsk. Many of the Bagrationi were then deported to Russia, and many fled both Georgia and Russia following the Russian Revolution of 1917. Today there is a small but politically active monarchist movement in Georgia.

Giorgi was recognised in 1991 by the Georgian government and parliament as head of the former royal family despite rival claims by other branches of the Bagrationi dynasty. He inherited from his father the titles Duke of the Lasos, Prince of Kakhetia, Kartalia and Mukhraneli. He was also Grand Master of the Order of the Eagle of Georgia and the Tunic of Our Lord Jesus Christ, and the Protector Egregio of Divisa of the Old Cavalry and Devotion of San Miguel the Milagroso.

Prince Giorgi made his first visit to his ancestral homeland to bury his father's ashes in 1995. He lived in Marbella, Spain most of his life, but moved to Georgia, where his sons David and Irakli lived. He died in Tbilisi on 16 January 2008 from complications of hepatitis. He was interred among his ancestors, the kings of Georgia, in the Svetitskhoveli Cathedral in Mtskheta on 20 January 2008.

== Family ==
Jorge married, firstly, María de las Mercedes Zornoza y Ponce de León (14 August 1942, Madrid – 17 March 2020, Villafranca del Castillo). Their children were:

- Princess María Antonieta Bagrationi-Mukhraneli (born 21 June 1969), wed in 1994 to Jaime Gaixas Marcet. They have a son, Jaime Gaixas Bagration (born 15 September 1995).
- Prince Irakli Bagrationi-Mukhraneli (born 26 August 1972), unmarried and without issue, who renounced the succession in favour of his brother.
- David Bagration of Mukhrani (born 24 June 1976), who wed Ana Bagration-Gruzinsky (born 1 November 1976), daughter of the head of the Kakhetian branch of the Bagrationi dynasty, Prince Nugzar Bagration-Gruzinsky, on 8 February 2009 at the Tbilisi Sameba Cathedral, in Tbilisi. Prince David and Princess Anna's son, Giorgi Bagration Bagrationi was born in 2011.

Jorge married, secondly, fellow race car driver Nuria Llopis y Oliart (born 14 November 1953 in Barcelona). They had one child:

- Prince Gourami Ugo Bagration (born 14 February 1985), wed civilly on 19 November 2022, Niki "Nekia" Lane (California-born and Bahrain-based Regional Director for Oxford Business Group), at Benahavís, Province of Málaga, Spain.

== Complete Formula One World Championship results ==
(key)

Year	Entrant	Chassis	Engine	1	2	3	4	5	6	7	8	9	10	11	12	13	14	15	WDC	Points
1968	Escudería Nacional CS	Lola T100	Ford Cosworth FVA 1.6 L4	RSA	ESP; DNA	MON	BEL	NED	FRA	GBR	GER	ITA	CAN	USA	MEX				NC	0
1974	Escudería Nacional CS	Surtees TS16	Ford Cosworth DFV 3.0 V8	ARG	BRA	RSA	ESP; DNA	BEL	MON	SWE	NED	FRA	GBR	GER	AUT	ITA	CAN	USA	NC	0

== Ancestors ==
Ancestors of Jorge de Bagration

16. Prince Irakli Konstantinovich Bagration of Mukhrani
8. Alexander, Prince Bagrationi-Mukhraneli
17. Princess Ekaterina Ivanovna Argutinskaya-Dolgorukova
4. George, Prince Bagrationi-Mukhraneli
18. Vice-Admiral Dmitry Zakharovich Golovachev
9. Maria Dmitrievna Golovatcheva
19. Leonida Augusta Georgievna von Hessen
2. Irakli, Prince Bagrationi-Mukhraneli
20. Dymitr Złotnicki
10. Sigismund Nowina Złotnicki
21. Celestyna Trzeciak
5. Helena Nowina Złotnicka
22. Prince Elizbar Eristavi of Ksani
11. Princess Maria Elisabarowna Eristavi-Ksani
23. Princess Ketevan Eristavi of Ksani
1. Prince Jorge Bagration-Mukhrani
24. Quirino Pasquini
12. Carisio Pasquini
25. Eva Matteucci
6. Ugo Pasquini, Count di Costafiorita
26. Domenico Mancini
13. Caterina Mancini
27. Agnese Martelli
3. Maria Antonietta Pasquini dei conti di Costafiorita
14. Francesco Antonio Gastaldi
7. Enrichetta Albertina Cesira Gastaldi
15. Augusta Petrini
31. Piera Petrini

== See also ==
- Monarchism in Georgia

Jorge Bagration of Mukhrani House of Mukhrani Cadet branch of the Bagrationi dynasty Born: 22 February 1944 Died: 16 January 2008
Titles in pretence
Preceded by Irakli Bagration-Mukhraneli	— TITULAR — Pretender of the throne of Georgia; 1977–2008	Succeeded by David Bagrationi of Moukrani
