= Monarchism in Georgia =

Support for the Bagrationi dynasty

Georgia has a monarchic tradition that traces its origins to the Hellenistic period. The medieval Kingdom of Georgia ruled by the Bagrationi dynasty has left behind a legacy that lasts in Georgia even in modern times. The qualities and symbols associated with the Bagrationi monarchy have been crucial in the making of the Georgian nation and the subsequent construction of national history. Their rule ended with the annexation of Georgian lands by the Russian Empire early in the 19th century, although several branches of the dynasty survive to this day. The monarchic restoration was considered by various royalist groups throughout the 20th century. Although Georgia's politics has been taking place in the framework of a semi-presidential republic since the nation regained its independence from the Soviet Union in 1991, the debate on monarchy, particularly its constitutional form, has never actually ceased. The issue came up most recently amid a political crisis in late 2007 and in 2017.

== Imperial Russian rule and Revolution ==
The Russian Empire absorbed the two principal Georgian kingdoms, those of Kartli-Kakheti and Imereti in 1801 and 1810, respectively. The members of the dispossessed royal dynasty fomented a series of rebellions against Russian rule, but all of them failed. The Russian administration, using a combination of military pacification and diplomatic persuasion, succeeded in winning a degree of loyalty of local elites. The Bagrationi princes themselves subsequently bowed to the inevitable and reconciled with a fait accompli.

Shortly after the Decembrist revolt of 1825, royalist Georgians in St. Petersburg and Moscow, urged on by the grandsons of the penultimate king of Georgia Erekle II, the princes Okropir and Dimitri, tried to convince Georgian students in the two Russian cities that Georgia should be independent under the Bagrationi dynasty. Okropir visited Tiflis in 1829 and helped found a secret society with the aim of restoring the Georgian monarchy. Inspired by the French revolution of 1830 and the Polish insurrection of 1830-1831, the conspirators were united in their anti-Russian sentiment but divided in their program although the majority favored a restoration of the Bagrationi to the Georgian throne. The planned coup was prevented by the police in 1832.

The loyalty of Georgian nobility to the Russian Tsar, won by liberal politics of the Imperial viceroy Prince Vorontsov (1844–1854), began to fade in the 1860s. Yet, after the Georgian royalist-led conspiracy in 1832, no Georgian movement or political party called for an outright independence until World War I.

During the World War I years, Georgian émigrés, under the guidance of Prince Matchabelli established a National Committee in Berlin which considered a reinstatement of a monarchy in Georgia under the German protectorate. An influential lobby of the idea was Otto von Lossow, who suggested putting the German prince Joachim of Prussia on the Georgian throne. However, following the Russian Revolution of 1917, Georgians restored their independent state in the form of a democratic republic (May 26, 1918), the result of a long-time domination of Georgian political scene by Social Democrats. Georgian nobility, including the scions of the former royal dynasty, lent their support to a new republic. As a contemporary Western observer noted: "Like that of France, the Georgian nobility has a social rather than a political significance. The people are democratic in spirit; there is not the least chance of a revival of monarchy in Georgia, and the nobles will hardly have more political weight than their individual merit entitles."

== Soviet era and post-Soviet independence ==
The Democratic Republic of Georgia fell to Soviet Russia’s Red Army invasion in 1921. The subsequent political repressions, especially during the abortive August Uprising in 1924, forced many of the Bagrationi family members to flee the Soviet Union; some of them died in purges.

One of the émigrés, Prince Irakli of the House of Mukhrani (a collateral branch of the Bagrationi dynasty) (1909–1977), tried to enlist the support of European powers for a Georgian monarchist cause. After settling in Spain before World War II, Prince Irakli founded what he called the Royal House of Georgia and sought support from European governments for a Georgian monarchy independent from the Soviet Union. When Prince Irakli died in Spain in 1977, his son Jorge became first in line to the royal house of Georgia and was recognised as such, albeit as a formality, by the government and parliament of the new independent republic in 1991, despite rival claims from others. The legitimate rights of the Mukhrani branch, albeit senior genealogically, to the throne have been questioned, however, due to the fact that the patrilineal descendants of the last king of Kartli-Kakheti in eastern Georgia to reign – the Bagration-Gruzinsky – still survive in Georgia, although close to extinction. This line was represented by Prince Nugzar Bagration-Gruzinsky (1950 – 2025), the heir male of Kartli-Kakheti's last reigning king, George XII.

As Georgia was moving towards independence from the Soviet Union early in the 1990s, monarchical restoration was an issue on the fringes of politics, but without actual candidates to a throne and popular support for monarchy. Various Georgian political groups tried to negotiate a return of Jorge de Bagration, Head of the Royal House of Georgia, and even sent a delegation to Madrid to persuade the reluctant prince. Some political activists, especially those associated with the National Democratic Party, speculated that a constitutional monarchy in Georgia would help abort any efforts by Moscow to keep Georgia inside the Soviet Union. After Georgia's declaration of independence on April 9, 1991, weak and fractious opposition groups again raised the issue of restoration hoping to neutralize Zviad Gamsakhurdia, the first popularly elected President of Georgia. However, after the coup against Gamsakhurdia, there was no serious consideration given to monarchist ideas during the rule of Eduard Shevardnadze (1992–2003). Several minor opposition parties, including the Union of Georgian Traditionalists led by the former parliamentary chairman Akaki Asatiani, continued to unsuccessfully advocate for constitutional monarchy as a viable alternative for Georgia's government. The House of Mukhrani itself was divided over the issue of heir: Jorge de Bagration himself supported the restoration, believing that the monarchy would help to guarantee democracy in Georgia and avoid the political unrest, although his sister Maria Paz doubted that the restoration would solve the country's problems and described Jorge as a "playboy unfit for the job", instead supporting the candidacy of their brother Bagrat.

The Mukhrani and Gruzinsky branches acted to resolve their conflict over succession by uniting through the marriage of Jorge's son David Bagration of Mukhrani with Nugzar's eldest daughter, Anna Bagration-Gruzinsky, in February 2009. Prince David and Princess Anna became the parents of a baby boy on September 27, 2011, Prince Giorgi Bagration Bagrationi who, in his person, potentially unites the Mukhraneli and Gruzinsky claims. Since no other Bagrationi prince was born in the Gruzinsky line before Nugzar's death in 2025, Prince Giorgi became both the heir apparent to both the heir male of the House of Bagrationi and the heir general of George XIII of Kartli-Kakheti.

Nonetheless, speculation about the candidacy for a restored throne of other Bagrationis has occurred. Some monarchists have floated the name of Don Lelio Nicolò Orsini, a son of Don Raimondo Orsini and Princess Khétévane Bagration de Moukhrani, but Princess Khétévane herself rejected the idea as impossible.

== Current debate ==
A monarchy option has always caused an ambiguous resonance in Georgia. On the one hand, the monarchy is considered a symbol of Georgian unity and independence, and on the other hand it belongs to a remote past, with a significant gap of more than 200 years in monarchic tradition. Thus, according to one survey conducted in 1998, only 16.3% of 828 respondents believed that a monarchy would be a good or very good form of government when asked how suitable they think various types of government were or would be for Georgia.

The skeptics say the restoration of the monarchy is technically impossible due to several reasons including the number of candidates and an unsettled question of succession to the Georgian throne. Additionally, they believe that the criteria for selecting the king will lead to major disagreements. The fact that Prince Giorgi will very likely unite the two principal surviving branches of the family after inheriting the rival claims from his parents, may help diminish such skepticism. However, the attempts to bring two royal families together proved to be short-lived as the Giorgi's parents divorced two years after his birth, in 2013, and in 2019 Ana Bagration-Gruzinsky and her father Nugzar filed a lawsuit against Davit Bagration-Mukhraneli over who should be allowed to speak and give away gifts in the name of the Georgian monarchy, with both sides questioning authenticity of each other's royal origins during the court hearings.

The supporters of constitutional monarchy continue to argue that this form of state would best protect the interests of citizens of Georgia; a monarch "would reign not rule", and act as a safeguard of stability and national unity. They see the return to monarchy as a "historical justice", referring to the fact that the native royal dynasty has never been rejected or overthrown by the Georgian people, but was dispossessed by a foreign power (i.e., Russia).

=== Recent events ===
The debate on a constitutional monarchy was revitalized with the political crisis that emerged in Georgia late in 2007. The October 7, 2007 sermon of Catholicos-Patriarch Ilia II, the popular head of the Georgian Orthodox Church, gave an impetus to a renewed political debate. The patriarch, who always sympathized with the idea of constitutional monarchy, said, during his Sunday service at the Cathedral of the Holy Trinity, that the restoration of the royal dynasty was a "desirable dream of the Georgian people". He also emphasized that if the people of Georgia chose this model of governance, "a candidate to the crown should be selected among representatives of the royal dynasty, and he should be suitably raised to be King from childhood."

The Patriarch's sermon gave an unexpected continuation to the political crisis in Georgia. Although the Patriarch's sympathies towards the monarchy were not something new for the regular parish to hear, several opposition parties immediately seized on the opportunity to advance their slogan "Georgia without a President", a reference to the model of parliamentary rule advocated by the Georgian opposition. Many politicians expressed their support to a constitutional monarchy, with a transitional stage in the form of a parliamentary republic. The leader of opposition party The Way of Georgia, Salome Zourabichvili said in October 2007, "I have always been a supporter of constitutional monarchy as the right form for Georgia. But, this issue needs to be resolved after the elections in the country. Right now, the main thing is to get the country out of the turmoil and prepare for the next elections, and then [we can] decide whether we need the institution of the president. Personally, I think that the presidential republic does not [have justification] in our country and we need to think about switching to a system of constitutional monarchy."

The authorities' response to the calls for a monarchy was restrained. Nino Burjanadze, a co-speaker of the Parliament of Georgia, expressed skepticism about the idea and stated that Georgia would not be able to decide on such an important issue until the restoration of its territorial integrity, referring to the disputed secession of Abkhazia and South Ossetia. President Mikheil Saakashvili, having jokingly remarked on his remote Bagratid ancestry, said that "serious consideration is necessary to this issue so that we do not add new problems to the already existing ones." Giga Bokeria, an influential member of the parliament from Saakashvili's United National Movement, tried to soft-pedal the Patriarch's statement: "The patriarch didn’t suggest establishing monarchy today. He meant this may happen after Georgia resolves its fundamental problems." He later alleged that the opposition's call for a constitutional monarchy was merely a populist move: "they speak about constitutional monarchy here and do not say anything about it abroad. This is their double-standard policy." Ilia II himself avoided further commenting on the topic.

Meanwhile, the opposition New Rights party, which stood aside from the anti-government demonstrations staged by a coalition of ten opposition parties in October and November 2007, became the only major political group to add a more nuanced view on the establishment of a constitutional monarchy to their agenda. They issued a special declaration supporting the idea and proposing to hold a referendum on the issue, a suggestion which was also included in the pre-election campaign of David Gamkrelidze, a candidate from the New Rights/Industrialists bloc for the early presidential elections held on January 5, 2008.

In June 2017, the issue of restoration was again brought up by Patriarch Illia II, who said that "the constitutional monarchy will bring peace to the country". The Vice Speaker of Parliament and one of the leaders of the ruling Georgian Dream party Gia Volski said that he considered the potential restoration of Georgian monarchy as a "positive development". He said that monarchy would help to unify various nationalities of the country under the common banner, such as Abkhazians and Ossetians. However, he said that he did not consider the restoration as realistic because of the royal family not being "prepared" to present a "real candidate", although he emphasized that he supported promoting positive views on constitutional monarchy. Mamuka Mdinaradze, the chairman of the Georgian Dream parliamentary faction, said that he considered the restoration of monarchy as "premature" but possibly more acceptable in 10-20 years.

On 16 December 2018, Prince David Bagration of Mukhrani was invited to the inauguration at a former royal residence of Georgia's first female president, Salome Zourabichvili.

As of 2024, Georgian Idea and Eri support the restoration of the monarchy in Georgia.

== Public opinion ==
Public opinions about the restoration of monarchy in Georgia.

Date	Polling organization	Question	Yes	No	No answer	Ref
October 23, 2007	"Kviris Palitra" (newspaper)	"Do you support the idea of a transition to constitutional monarchy?"	45%	29.6%	25.4%	
November 4, 2013	"Big Politics" (talk show)	"Should Georgia have a King?"	78.9%	21.0%	—	
November 5, 2013	"Barrier" (talk show)	"Should monarchy be restored in Georgia?"	56.8%	42.4%	—	

== See also ==
- Georgian monarchs family tree of Bagrationi dynasty
- Georgian monarchs family tree of Bagrationi dynasty of Kartli
- Georgian monarchs family tree of Bagrationi dynasty of Kakheti
- Georgian monarchs family tree of Bagrationi dynasty of Imereti
