= Bagrationi dynasty =

Georgian royal dynasty

Bagrationi ბაგრატიონი
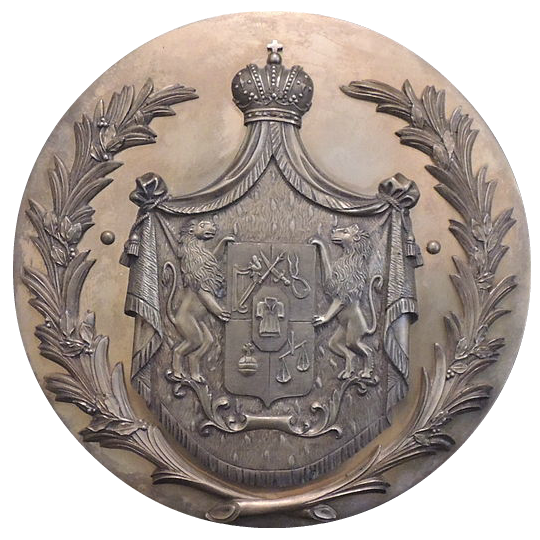
- Coat of arms of Batonishvili Vakhtang at Alexander Nevsky Lavra
- Country: Georgia
- Current head: disputed
- Final ruler: George XII and Prince David Bagrationi in Kartli-Kakheti Solomon II in Imereti
- Style: see list
- Deposition: 1801 in Kartli-Kakheti; 1810 in Imereti
- Cadet branches: Mukhrani; Gruzinsky; Davitishvili; Imeretinsky

The Bagrationi dynasty (/bʌɡrʌtiˈɒni/; Georgian: ბაგრატიონი, romanized: bagrat'ioni; [ˈbäɡɾätʼio̞n̪i]) is a royal dynasty which reigned in Georgia from the Middle Ages until the early 19th century, being among the oldest extant Christian ruling dynasties in the world. In modern usage, the name of the dynasty is sometimes Hellenized and referred to as the Georgian Bagratids, also known in English as the Bagrations.

The origins of the dynasty are disputed but most scholars agree that the dynasty shares them with the Armenian Bagratuni dynasty. The early Georgian Bagratids gained the Principality of Iberia through dynastic marriage after succeeding the Chosroid dynasty at the end of the 8th century. In 888 Adarnase IV of Iberia restored the Georgian monarchy; various native polities then united into the Kingdom of Georgia, which prospered from the 11th to the 13th century. This period of time, particularly the reigns of David IV the Builder (1089–1125) and of his great-granddaughter Tamar the Great (1184–1213) inaugurated the Georgian Golden Age in the history of Georgia.

After the collapse of the Kingdom of Georgia in the late 15th century, the branches of the Bagrationi dynasty ruled the three breakaway Georgian kingdoms, the Kingdom of Kartli, the Kingdom of Kakheti, and the Kingdom of Imereti, until Russian annexation in the early-19th century. While the 3rd article of the 1783 Treaty of Georgievsk guaranteed continued sovereignty for the Bagrationi dynasty and their continued presence on the Georgian throne, the Russian Empire later broke the terms of the treaty and fully annexed the protectorate. The dynasty persisted within the Russian Empire as an Imperial Russian noble family until the 1917 February Revolution. The establishment of Soviet rule in Georgia in 1921 forced some members of the family to accept demoted status and loss of property in Georgia. Other members relocated to Western Europe, but some Bagrations repatriated after Georgia regained independence in 1991.

== Origins ==
The earliest Georgian forms of the dynastic name are Bagratoniani, Bagratuniani and Bagratovani, changed subsequently into Bagrationi. These names as well as the Armenian Bagratuni and the modern designation Bagratid mean "the children of Bagrat" or "the house of/established by Bagrat", Bagrat being a given name of Iranian origin. The origins of the Bagratid dynasty is still matter of debate between Georgian and Armenian scholars. Georgian scholars argue that the Bagrationis were of Georgian origin, while Armenian and Western scholars believe them to be a branch of the Armenian Bagratunis.

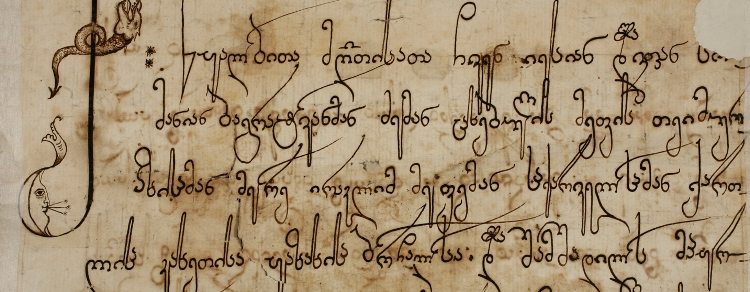
A royal charter issued by Heraclius II of Georgia styling him as "by the mercy of God ... we, of Iesian-Davitian-Solomonian-Bagratovani, son of the anointed King Teimuraz, Heraclius the Second, King of Georgia, Kartli, Kakheti, ..."

According to a tradition first recorded in the work of the 11th-century Georgian chronicler Sumbat Davitis-Dze and repeated much later by Prince Vakhushti Bagrationi (1696–1757), the dynasty claimed descent from the biblical king and prophet David and came from Israel around 530 AD. The tradition had it that of seven refugee brothers of the Davidic line, three of them settled in Armenia and the other four arrived in Kartli (also known as Iberia), where they intermarried with the local ruling houses and acquired some lands in hereditary possession, with one of the four brothers, Guaram (died in 532), founding a line subsequently called Bagrationi after his son Bagrat. A successor, Guaram, was installed as a presiding prince of Iberia under the Byzantine protectorate, receiving on this occasion the Byzantine court title of Kouropalates (Note: From the time of Justinian I, the dignity of Kouropalates (Greek: κουροπαλάτης, i.e., chancellor) was one of the highest in the Byzantine Empire, reserved usually for members of the Imperial family. Its frequent conferral upon various Georgian and Armenian dynasts attests to their importance in the politics of those times..) in 575. Thus, according to this version, began the dynasty of the Bagrationis, who ruled until 1801.

This tradition enjoyed a general acceptance until the early 20th century. The Jewish origin, let alone the biblical descent, of the Bagratids has been discounted by modern scholarship. Cyril Toumanoff's research concluded that the Georgian Bagratids branched out of the Armenian Bagratid dynasty in the person of Adarnase, whose father Vasak (son of Ashot III the Blind, presiding prince of Armenia from 732 to 748) passed to Kartli following an abortive uprising against Arab rule in 775. Adarnase's son, Ashot I, acquired the Principality of Iberia in 813 and thus founded the last royal house of Georgia. Accordingly, the legend of the Davidic origin of the Georgian Bagratids was a further development of the earlier claim entertained by the Armenian dynasty, as given in the work of the Armenian author Moses of Khorene. Once the Georgian branch, which had quickly acculturated in the new environment, assumed royal power, the myth of their biblical origin helped to maintain their legitimacy and became a major ideological pillar of their millennium-long rule of Georgia.

The generation-by-generation history of the Bagrationi dynasty begins only in the late 8th century. Toumanoff claimed that the first Georgian branch of the Bagratids may be traced as far back as the 2nd century AD, when they were said to rule over the princedom of Odzrkhe in what is now southern Georgia. The Odzrkhe line, known in the medieval annals as the Bivritianis, lasted until the 5th century AD. They cannot, however, be considered the direct ancestors of the later Bagratids who eventually restored Georgian royal authority. Pavle Ingorokva suggested that the Bagrations were a branch of the Pharnavazid dynasty of the Kingdom of Iberia.

== History ==
=== Early dynasty ===
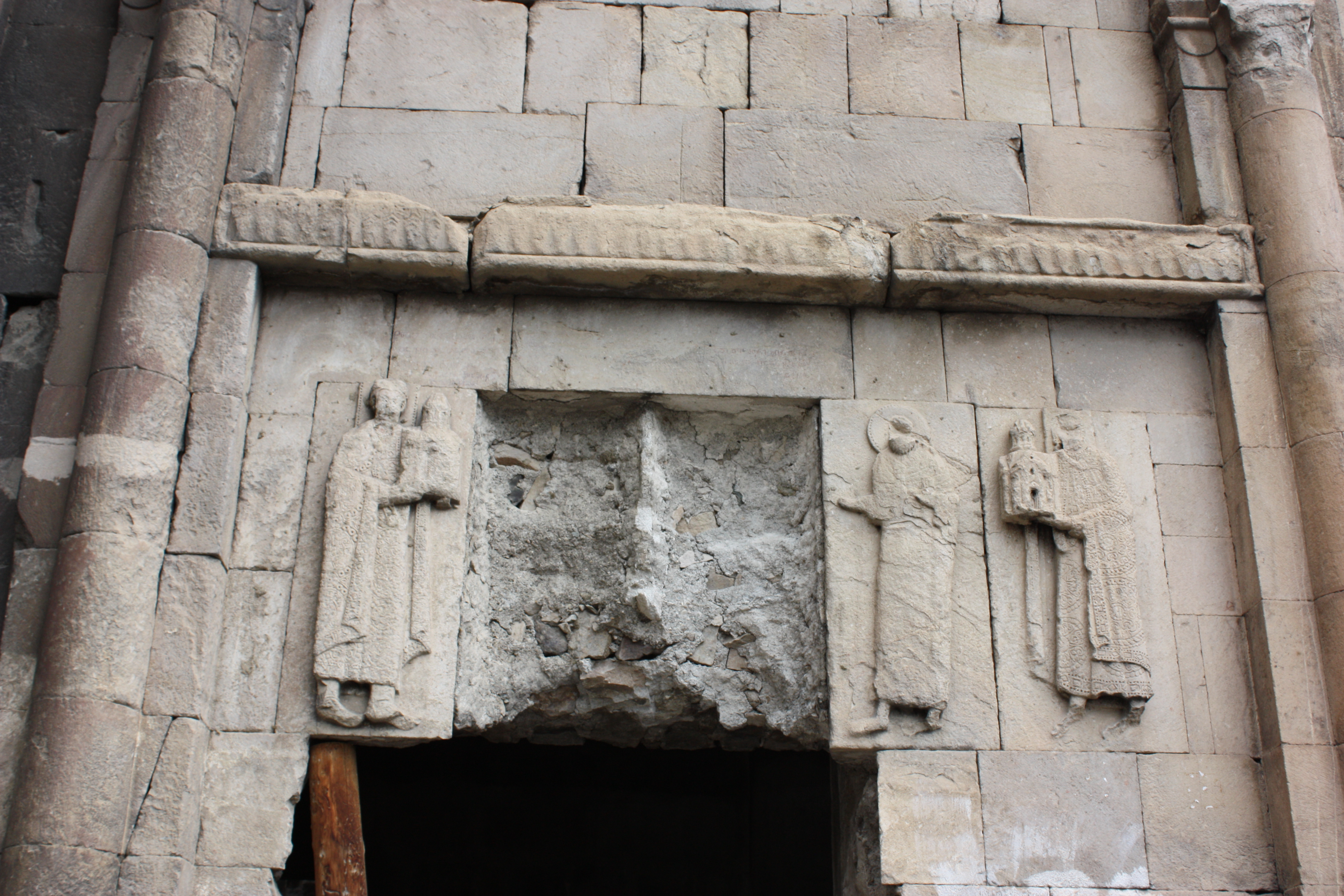
David III of Tao depicted on a bas-relief from the Oshki Monastery.

The Bagrationi family had grown in prominence by the time the Georgian monarchy (Caucasian Iberia) fell to the Sassanid Persian Empire in the 6th century, and the leading local princely families were exhausted by Arab attacks. The rise of the new dynasty was made possible by the extinction of the Guaramids and the near-extinction of the Chosroids, the two earlier dynasties of Iberia with whom the Bagratids extensively intermarried, and also by the Abbasid preoccupation with their own civil wars and conflict with the Byzantine Empire. Although Arab rule did not allow them a foothold in the ancient capital of Tbilisi and eastern Kartli, the Bagratids successfully maintained their initial domain in Klarjeti and Meskheti and, under the Byzantine protectorate, extended their possessions southward into the northwestern Armenian marches to form a large polity conventionally known in modern history as Tao-Klarjeti. In 813, the new dynasty acquired, with Ashot I, the hereditary title of presiding prince of Iberia (Kartli), to which the emperor attached the honorific title of kourapalates.

Despite the revitalization of the monarchy, Georgian lands remained divided among rival authorities, with Tbilisi remaining in Arab hands. The sons and grandsons of Ashot I established three separate branches – the lines of Kartli, Tao, and Klarjeti – frequently struggling with each other and with neighboring rulers. The Kartli line prevailed; in 888, with Adarnase I, it restored the indigenous Iberian royal authority dormant since 580. His descendant Bagrat III was able to consolidate his inheritance in Tao-Klarjeti and the Abkhazian Kingdom, due largely to the diplomacy and conquests of his energetic foster-father David III of Tao.

=== Golden Age ===
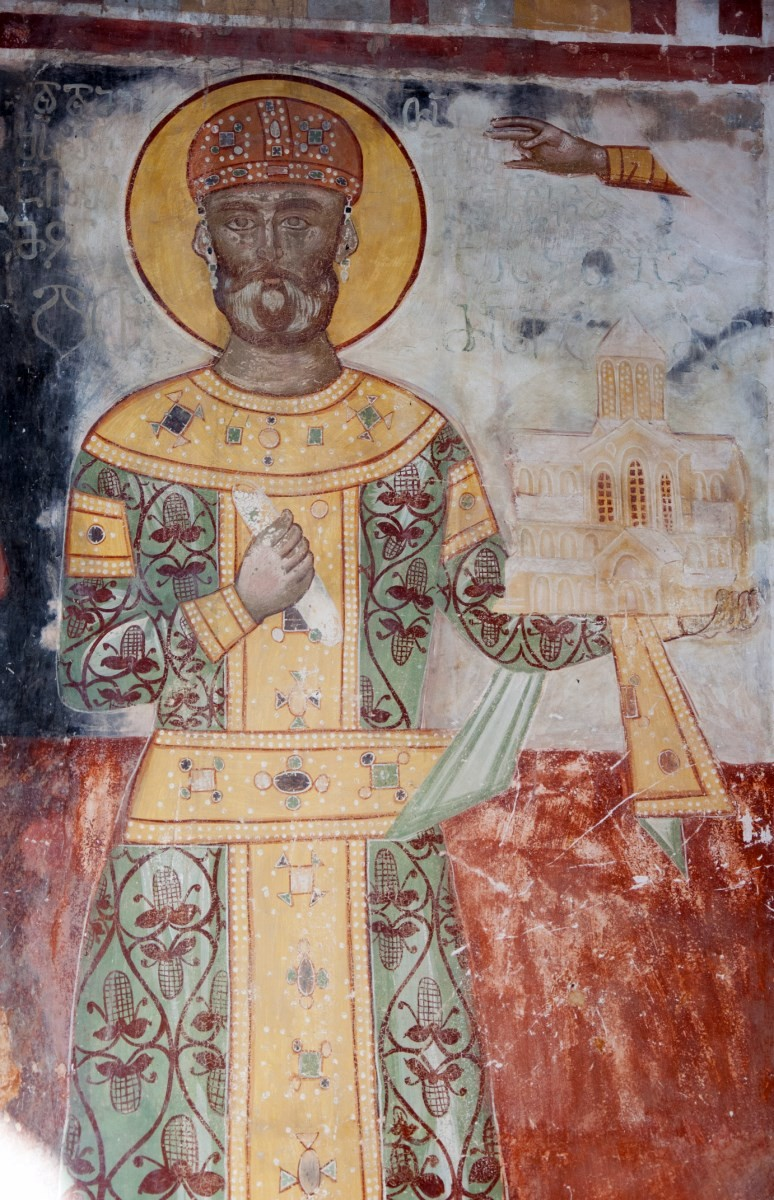
King David IV.

This unified monarchy maintained its precarious independence from the Byzantine and Seljuk empires throughout the 11th century, flourished under David IV the Builder (1089–1125), who repelled the Seljuk attacks and essentially completed the unification of Georgia with the re-conquest of Tbilisi in 1122. With the decline of Byzantine power and the dissolution of the Great Seljuk Empire, Georgia became one of the pre-eminent nations of the Christian East, her pan-Caucasian empire stretching, at its largest extent, from the North Caucasus to northern Iran, and eastwards into Asia Minor.

In spite of repeated incidents of dynastic strife, the kingdom continued to prosper during the reigns of Demetrios I (1125–1156), George III (1156–1184), and especially, his daughter Tamar the Great (1184–1213). With the death of George III the main male line became extinct and the dynasty continued through the marriage of Queen Tamar with the Alan prince David Soslan, of reputed Bagratid descent. (Note: According to Prince Vakhushti, David Soslan's ancestry traced back to the Georgian refugee prince David, a grandchild of George I of Georgia (1014–1027) and his Alan wife Alde. This continues to be disputed.)

=== Downfall ===
The invasions by the Khwarezmians in 1225 and the Mongols in 1236 terminated Georgia's "golden age". The struggle against the Mongol rule created a dyarchy, with an ambitious lateral branch of the Bagrationi dynasty holding sway over western Georgia (Imereti). There was a brief period of reunion and revival under George V the Brilliant (1299–1302, 1314–1346), but the eight onslaughts of the Turco-Mongol conqueror Timur between 1386 and 1403 dealt a great blow to the Georgian kingdom. About a century later, its unity was finally shattered by two rival Turkic federations; the Kara Koyunlu, and the Ak Koyunlu. By 1490/91, the once powerful monarchy fragmented into three independent kingdoms – Kartli (central to eastern Georgia), Kakheti (eastern Georgia), and Imereti (western Georgia) – each led by a rival branch of the Bagrationi dynasty, and into five semi-independent principalities – Odishi-Mingrelia, Guria, Abkhazia, Svaneti, and Samtskhe – dominated by their own feudal clans.

During the three subsequent centuries, the Georgian rulers maintained their perilous autonomy as subjects under the Turkish Ottoman and Persian Safavid, Afsharid, and Qajar domination, although sometimes serving as little more than puppets in the hands of their powerful suzerains. In this period, in order to receive investiture from their suzerains, as a necessary prerequisite, many Georgian rulers converted to Islam. Individuals from the Georgian royal family and nobility were frequently chosen for prominent administrative roles within the Safavid state. Members of the Muslim royals from the Bagrationi dynasty, amongst others, held the esteemed position of darugha ("prefect") of the Safavid royal capital of Isfahan for an extensive period spanning over 100 years, from 1618 to 1722. Despite being seated in Kartli starting from 1632, Rostom Khan, in particular, served as Isfahan's darugha for 40 years. Additionally, he appointed deputies to represent him in the Safavid capital.

The line of Imereti, incessantly embroiled in civil war, continued with many breaks in succession, and the kingdom was only relatively spared from the encroachments of its Ottoman suzerains, while Kartli and Kakheti were similarly subjected to its Persian overlords, whose efforts to annihilate the fractious vassal kingdoms were in vain, and the two eastern Georgian monarchies, survived to be reunified in 1762 under King Erekle II, who united in his person both the Kakhetian and Kartlian lines, the latter surviving in male descent in the branch of Mukhraneli since 1658.

=== Last monarchs ===
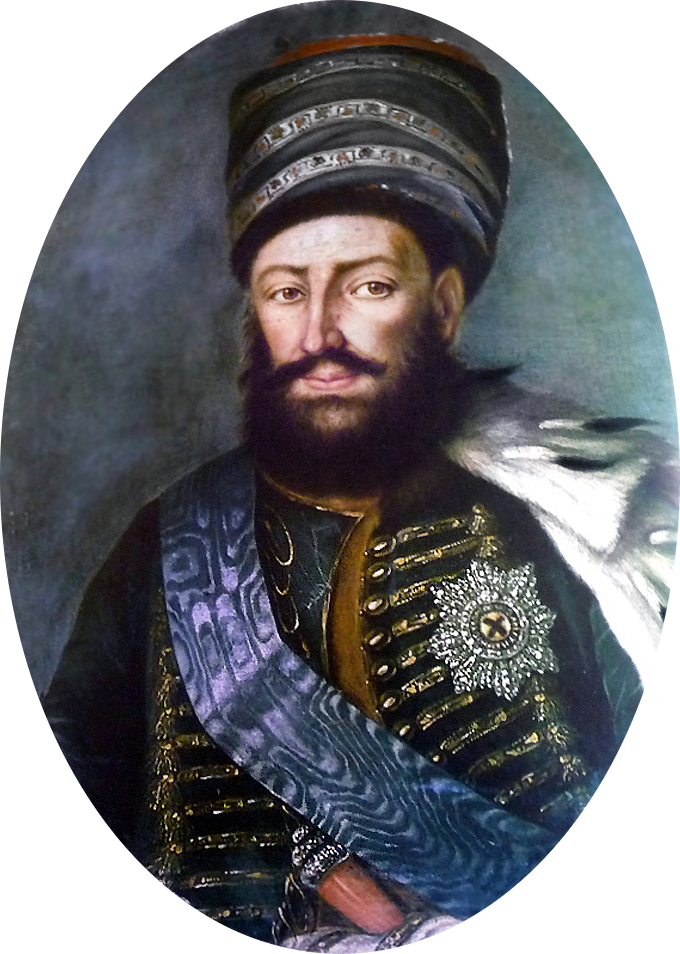
Erekle II, king of the eastern Georgian kingdoms of Kakheti and Kartli-Kakheti

In 1744, Erekle II and his father Teimuraz II were granted the kingships of Kakheti and Kartli respectively by their overlord Nader Shah, as a reward for their loyalty. Following Nader Shah's death in 1747, Erekle II and Teimuraz II capitalized on the eruption of instability, and declared de facto independence. After Teimuraz II died in 1762, Erekle II succeeded his father as ruler of Kartli, and united the two kingdoms in a personal union as the Kingdom of Kartli-Kakheti, becoming the first Georgian ruler to preside over a politically unified eastern Georgia in three centuries. At about the same time, Karim Khan Zand had ascended the Iranian throne; Erekle II quickly tendered his de jure submission to the new Iranian ruler, however, de facto, he remained autonomous throughout the entire Zand period.

Erekle II (Hercules) achieved a degree of stability in Kartli-Kakheti and established political hegemony in eastern Transcaucasia. In the 1783 Treaty of Georgievsk, he placed his kingdom under the protection of Imperial Russia. The latter failed, however, to provide timely help when the Persian ruler Agha Mohammad Khan Qajar captured, sacked and ravaged Tbilisi in 1795 to compel severance of Georgian ties to Russia, as he sought to re-establish Persia's traditional suzerainty over the region.

After the death of Erekle in 1798, his son and successor, King George XII, renewed a request for protection from Emperor Paul I of Russia, and urged him to intervene in the bitter dynastic feud among the numerous sons and grandsons of the late Erekle. Paul offered to incorporate the Kingdom of Kartli-Kakheti into the Russian Empire, while reserving to its native dynasty a degree of internal autonomy – essentially, mediatisation, and in 1799 the Russians marched into Tbilisi. Negotiations of terms were still in process, when Paul signed a manifesto on December 18, 1800, unilaterally declaring the annexation of Kartli-Kakheti to the Russian Empire. This proclamation was kept secret until the death of King George on December 28. His eldest son, the Tsarevich Davit, had been formally acknowledged as heir apparent by Emperor Paul on 18 April 1799, but his accession as king after his father's death was not recognized.

On September 12, 1801, Emperor Alexander I of Russia formally re-affirmed Paul's determination, deposing the Bagrationi dynasty from the Georgian throne. Although divided among themselves, some of the Bagrationi princes resisted Russian annexation, trying to instigate rebellion. Most of them were subsequently arrested and deported from Georgia.

The reign of the House of Imereti came to an end less than a decade later. On April 25, 1804, the Imeretian king Solomon II, nominally an Ottoman vassal, was persuaded to conclude the Convention of Elaznauri with Russia, on terms similar to those of the Treaty of Georgievsk. Yet the Russian forces dethroned Solomon on February 20, 1810. Defeated during a subsequent rebellion to regain power, he died in exile in Trabzon, Ottoman Turkey, in 1815. Russian rule over Georgia was eventually acknowledged in various peace treaties with Iran and the Ottomans and the remaining Georgian territories were absorbed by the Russian Empire in a piecemeal fashion in the course of the 19th century.

== Bagrationi in Russia ==
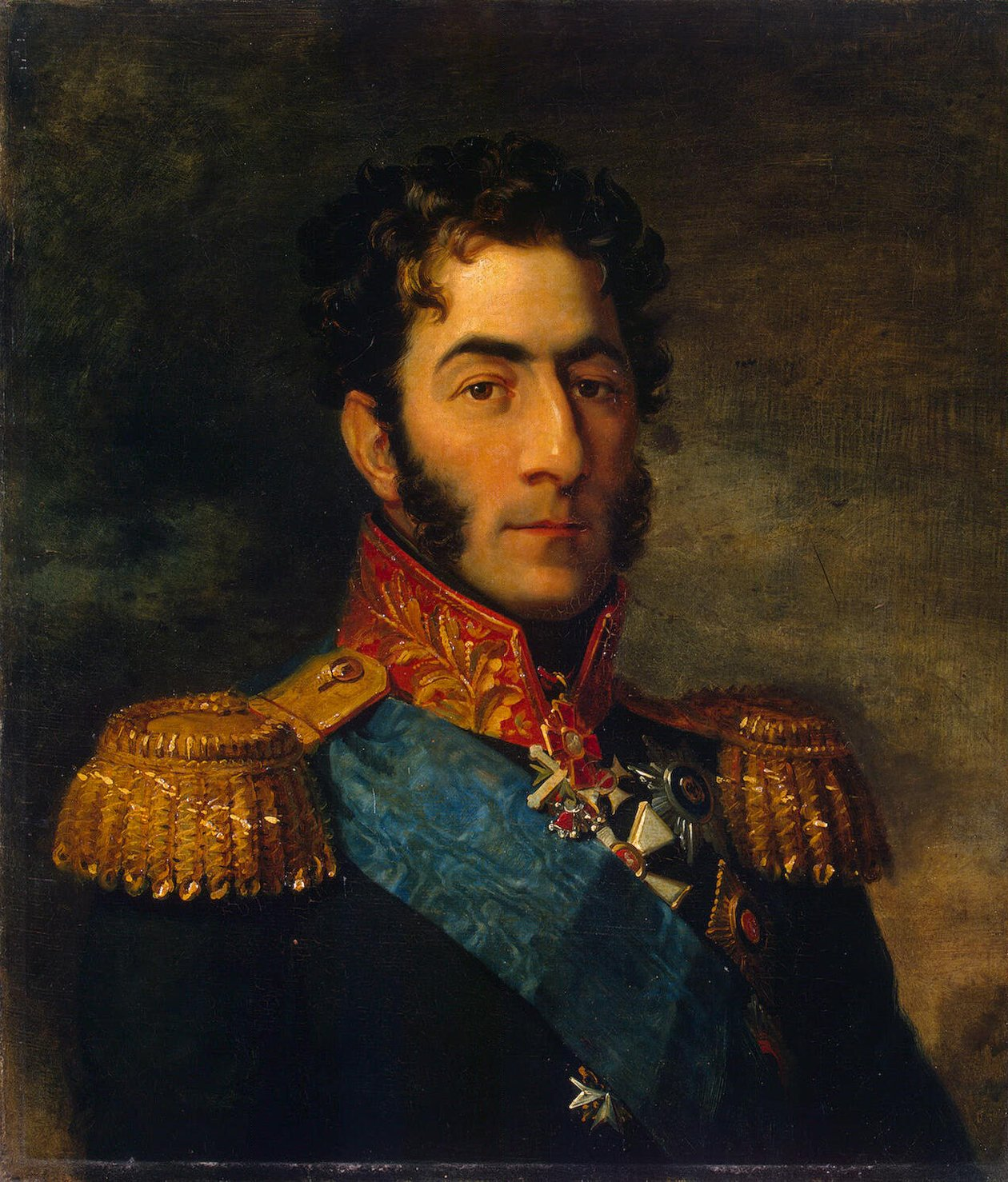
General Pyotr Bagration

In the Russian Empire, the Bagrationis became a prominent family of aristocrats. The most famous was Prince Pyotr Bagration, a great-grandson of King Jesse of Kartli who became a Russian general and hero of the Patriotic War of 1812. His brother Prince Roman Bagration also became a Russian general, distinguishing himself in the Russo-Persian War (1826–1828), and was the first to enter Yerevan in 1827. Roman Bagration was also known for his patronage of the arts, literature and theatre. His home theater in Tbilisi was regarded as one of the finest in the Caucasus. His son Prince Pyotr Romanovich Bagration became governor of the Tver region and later governor-general of the Baltic provinces. He was also a metallurgic engineer known for the development of gold cyanidation in Russia. Prince Dmitry Petrovich Bagration was a Russian general who fought in World War I in the Brusilov Offensive and later joined the Red Army.

== Bagrationi today ==
The majority of the Bagrationi family left Georgia after the Red Army took over Tbilisi in 1921.

=== Mukhrani branch ===

The House of Mukhrani is a cadet branch of the Bagrationi dynasty, descending directly from King Constantine II of Georgia. Originally a cadet branch of the former Royal House of Kartli, they claim agnatic genealogically seniority from the line of the Bagrationi family in the early 20th century; and although this elder branch had lost the rule of Kartli by 1724, it retained the Principality of Mukhrani until its annexation by Russia, along with Kartli-Kakheti, in 1800.

This branch of the family is related to the House of Borbón, the House of Wittelsbach, the House of Habsburg-Lorraine, and the House of Romanov. A member of this branch, Princess Leonida Georgievna Bagration-Moukhransky, married Vladimir Cyrillovich, Grand Duke of Russia, and became the mother of one of the claimants to the Romanov legacy, Maria Vladimirovna, Grand Duchess of Russia. The overwhelming majority of regnant and non-regnant Royal Houses recognize Prince Davit's claim to the Headship of the Royal House of Georgia.

In 1942 Prince Irakli (Erekle) Bagrationi-Mukhraneli, of the genealogically senior branch of the dynasty, proclaimed himself head of the Royal House of Georgia. He founded the Union of Georgian Traditionalists in exile. His second wife, Maria Antonietta Pasquini, daughter of Ugo, Count di Costafiorita, bore him a son and heir, but died in childbirth in February 1944. In August 1946 the widower married Princess María Mercedes de Baviera y Borbón, a granddaughter of King Alfonso XII, and daughter of Don Fernando de Baviera y Borbón, who had renounced his royal rights in Bavaria to become a naturalised infante in Spain.

Beginning in the 1990s, senior members of the Bagrationi-Mukhraneli descendants began re-patriating to Georgia from Spain, ending generations of exile. Irakli's elder son, Prince Georgi Bagrationi-Mukhraneli, was officially recognized by government and church leaders when he brought his father's remains from Spain to rest with those of his ancestors in Svetitskhoveli Cathedral at Mtskheta in 1995, and moved to Tbilisi in 2005, where he died. His eldest son, Prince Irakli (Erekle), born in 1972, deferred his dynastic claim to his younger brother, Prince Davit (born 1976). Thus, Prince Davit — who moved to Tbilisi and reclaimed his Georgian citizenship — became Head of the Family Council and the Mukhraneli dynastic titles.

=== Bagration-Gruzinsky branch ===
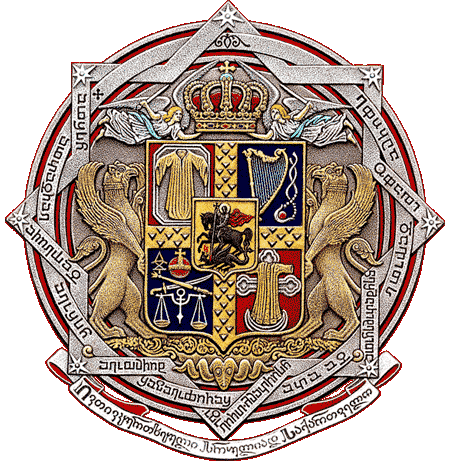

The Bagration-Gruzinsky line is the direct line of descendants from the last Sovereign George XII according to Georgian tradition who reigned over the kingdom of Kakheti, re-united the two realms in the kingdom of Kartli-Kakheti in 1762, and did not lose sovereignty until Russian annexation in 1800.

Prince Nugzar Petrovich Bagration-Gruzinski (1950–2025) was the last known male patrilineal descendant of Kartli-Kakheti's last king, George XII, and was, as such, head of the Kakhetian branch of the dynasty which, although genealogically junior to the Mukhranelis, has reigned more recently over a part of Georgia, not having lost the throne of a Georgian kingdom until 1800.

Nugzar was a theatrical and cinema director, while his father, Prince Petre Bagration-Gruzinski (1920–1984), was a poet, and authored "Song of Tiflis".

As Nugzar had no male issue, Prince Evgeny Petrovich Gruzinsky (1947-2018), the great-great-grandson of Bagrat's younger brother Ilia (1791–1854), who lived in the Russian Federation, was considered to be an heir presumptive within the same primogeniture principle. But he died without issue and no male descendant (recorded and official) was left in the Gruzinsky branch except Nugzar himself. Despite basing his claim on male primogeniture, Nugzar argued in favor of having his eldest daughter, Ana, designated as his heir prior to his death in 2025.

Princess Ana's role as Heir to the Throne and Head of the Royal House was acknowledged on May 12, 2025, in Tbilisi, Ana Bagration-Gruzinsky was officially recognized as Head of the Royal House of Georgia. The event took place on St. Andrew's Day at the Tbilisi City Assembly. The conference was opened by Metropolitan Shio Mujiri and Metropolitan Daniel (Datuaashvili). With the consent and in the presence of Georgia's spiritual and academic elite, Metropolitan Anania (Japaridze) confirmed Decree No. 2 (2009) issued by Crown Prince Nugzar Bagration-Gruzinsky. This recognition marks strong support for Ana's position from both the Church and the scholarly community.

=== Bagration-Davitishvili branch ===

The Bagration-Davitishvil, known in the Russian tradition as the Bagration-Davydov, are a tavadi branch of the Kakhetian line of the Bagrationi dynasty. They descend in direct male line from Prince Demetre (born 1472), younger son of King Alexander I of Kakheti and grandson of George VIII, the last king of a unified Georgia. After Demetre was blinded by his brother, King George II "the Mad", in 1511, the family first appeared in sources under the surnames Tvaldamtsvriani and Tvaldamtsvrishvili ("of the house of the blinded one"), before taking the name Davitishvili after Prince David, son of the blinded Demetre. Their hereditary domain, Sadavitishvilo, lay in Shida Kartli, and their family sepulchre is the Ruisi Cathedral. As a junior line of the royal house, they were classified as natomi mepeni ("of the royal root"). In the Russian Empire the family was Russified as the princes Davydovs, later Bagration-Davydov, and was confirmed in princely dignity by the Highest Decrees of 1849 and 1857. According to the genealogist S. V. Dumin, by the end of the 20th century (1998) the male line of King George II of Kakheti had died out, and by the rules of Georgian dynastic law seniority in the Kakhetian royal house passed to the descendants of Prince Demetre — that is, to the Bagration-Davitishvili family. Among modern representatives of the branch are Tamar Bagration, wife of the incumbent President of Georgia Mikheil Kavelashvili; Jansug (Jano) Bagration (1938–2022), a public figure, member of the Parliament of Georgia (1999–2004) and chairman of the Georgian National Olympic Committee (1996–2004).

A separate line — the aznaurs (untitled nobles) Davitishvili — has no documentary basis for its claim to descent from the princely house. The claim was fabricated by the historian Iosif Bichikashvili, who asserted that a junior, non-princely branch split off from the Bagration-Davitishvili in the first half of the 18th century. On the basis of forged and falsified documents, in 2014 the Georgian Ministry of Justice officially recognised their surname as Bagration-Davitishvili — a decision that was legally unfounded. Georgian historians Manana Khomeriki and Yuri Chikovani exposed the falsification: the sources cited record only the existence of aznaurs Davitishvili, with no evidence of descent from the princes, and the historian David Ninidze, whose work was invoked in support, explicitly denied any such connection. The aznauri line has consistently refused Y-DNA testing, whereas other Bagrationi branches — the Mukhrani, the Most Serene Princes Gruzinsky (Evgeny Petrovich), and the tavadi Bagration-Davitishvili themselves — share the haplogroup Q1b-L939, confirming a common male ancestor (Constantine I of Georgia). Khomeriki describes the affair as a deliberate "Bagrationisation" — the artificial attribution of royal descent — carried out to manufacture a mass base of support for Nugzar Bagration-Gruzinsky's claim to headship of the dynasty.

=== Imereti branch ===

Various sources present three different lines as the head of the House of Imereti, potential claimants to the long-defunct Kingdom of Imereti, the last of the three Georgian kingdoms to lose its independence in 1810. The male line descending from the deposed David II of Imereti became extinct in 1978 when Prince Constantine Imeretinski died. He was survived by three daughters of his older brother.

However, Prince Nugzar Petrovich Bagration-Gruzinski claims that the headship of the Imereti branch had – for one reason or another – transferred in the early 20th century to a cadet branch descending from an older son of Prince Bagrat of Imereti (1741–1800). Regardless, this branch died out in the male line in 1937 and in the female line in 2009.

The third claim names another branch descending from Prince Bagrat's younger natural son. This line survives in the male line and is headed by Prince David Bagrationi (born 1948) (not to be confused with his younger namesake from the Mukhrani branch).

The current claimant is Irakli Davitis Dze Bagrationi (Georgian: ირაკლი დავითის ძე ბაგრატიონი), head of the Georgian scion of the royal Bagrationi dynasty of Imereti, the direct male-line descendant of the kings of Imereti, the direct descendant of Alexander V (Georgian: ალექსანდრე V) (c. 1703/4 – March 1752), of the Bagrationi Dynasty, King of Imereti (western Georgia). Irakli is a son of David Bragationi and Irina Kobakhidze, born 10 July 1982 in Terjola, Imereti, Georgia. He is the future successor and head of the House of Bagrationi-Imereti. Irakli has been recognized by the Patriarch of Georgia, as well as the Ecumenical Patriarch of Constantinople, as well as the Unione della Nobiltà Bizantina (Ένωση της Βυζαντινής ευγένειας).

=== Union of Bagrationi branches ===
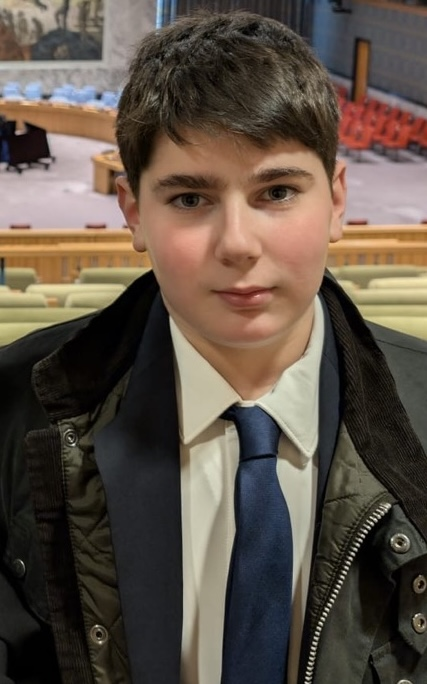
Giorgi Bagrationi in 2025.

Prince Nugzar's daughter, Princess Ana, a divorced teacher and journalist with two daughters, married Prince Davit Bagrationi-Mukhraneli, on 8 February 2009 at the Tbilisi Sameba Cathedral. The marriage united the Gruzinsky and Mukhrani branches of the Georgian royal family, and drew a crowd of 3,000 spectators, officials, and foreign diplomats, as well as extensive coverage by the Georgian media.

The dynastic significance of the wedding lay in the fact that, amidst the turmoil in political partisanship that has roiled Georgia since its independence in 1991, Patriarch Ilia II of Georgia publicly called for the restoration of the monarchy as a path toward national unity in October 2007. Although this led some politicians and parties to entertain the notion of a Georgian constitutional monarchy, competition arose among the old dynasty's princes and supporters, as historians and jurists debated which Bagrationi has the strongest hereditary right to a throne that has been vacant for two centuries.

Although some monarchists support the Gruzinsky branch's claim, others — including most Royal Houses — support that of the re-patriated Mukhraneli branch. Both branches descend from the medieval kings of Georgia down to Constantine II of Georgia who died in 1505, and continue as unbroken, legitimate male lines into the 21st century.

Aside from his unmarried elder brother Irakli, Davit is the heir male of the Bagrationi family, while the bride's father is the most senior descendant of the last Bagrationi to reign over the united kingdom of eastern Georgia. The marriage between Nugzar Gruzinsky's heiress and the Mukhrani heir may resolve their rivalry for the claim to the throne.

Prince Davit and Princess Ana became the parents of a boy on 27 September 2011, Prince Giorgi Bagrationi, who, in his person, became the potential uniter of the Mukhraneli and Gruzinsky claims. Since no other Bagrationi prince was born in the Gruzinsky branch, Prince Giorgi became the heir apparent to the heir general of George XIII of Kartli-Kakheti on 1 March 2025, alongside already being heir apparent to the heir male of the House of Bagrationi, when his maternal grandfather died and the Gruzinsky branch went extinct in the male line, which left his mother as the Gruzinsky heiress general.

== Gallery of some Georgian monarchs of Bagrationi dynasty ==
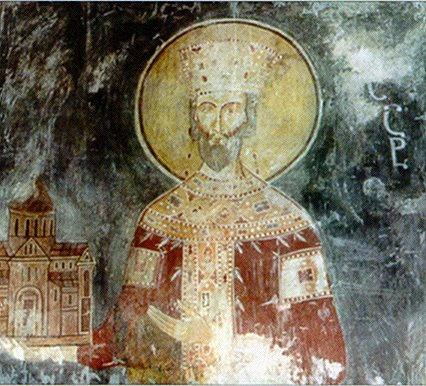
Bagrat III of Georgia

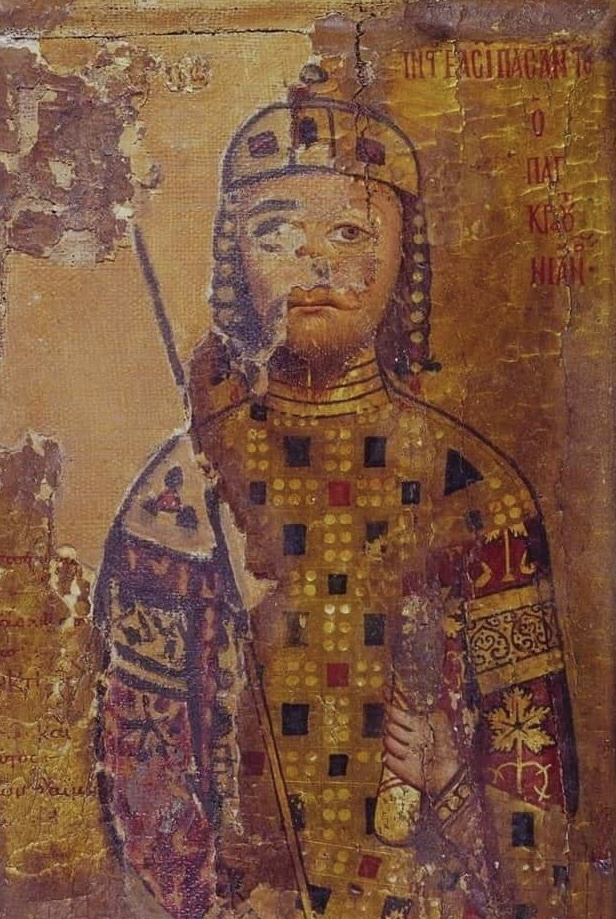
David IV of Georgia

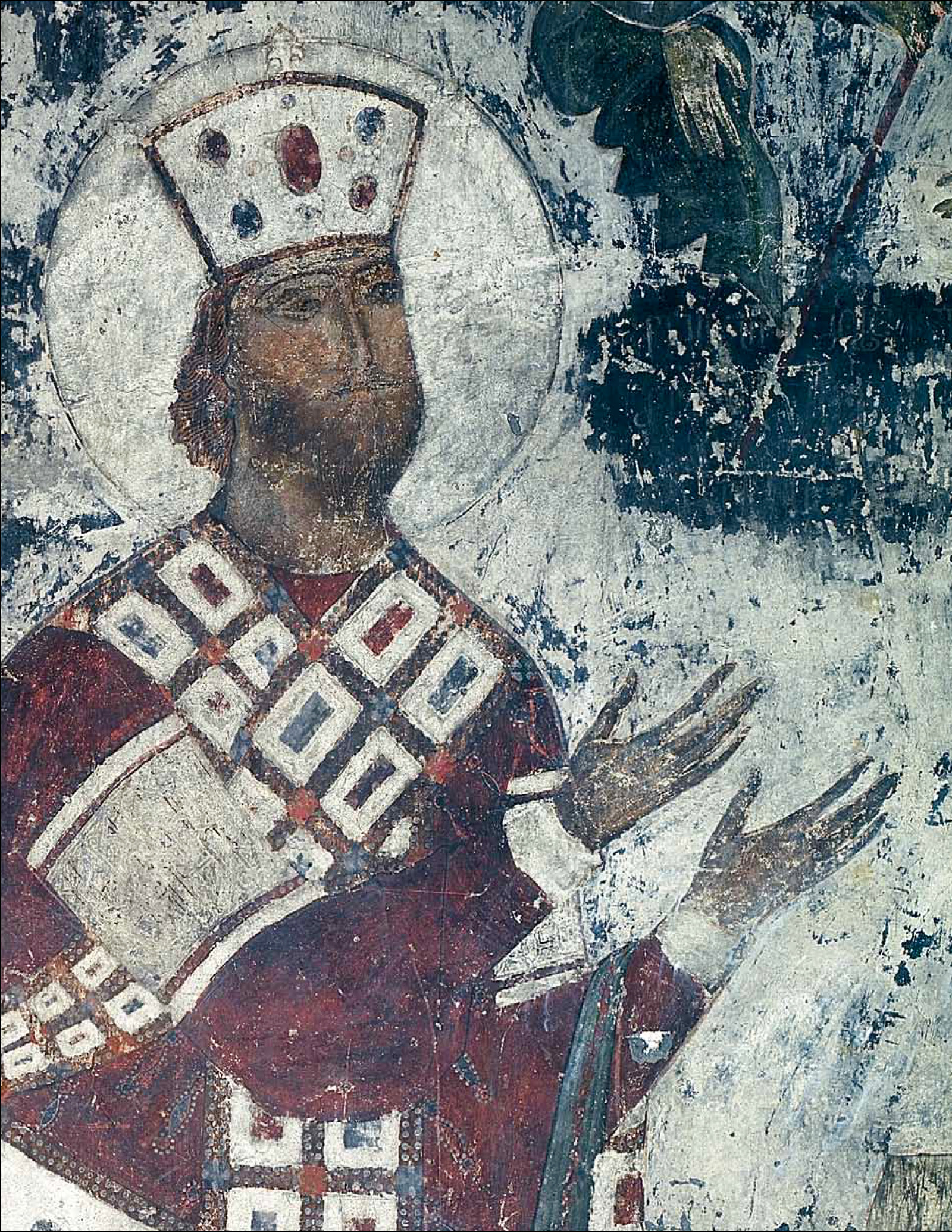
George III of Georgia

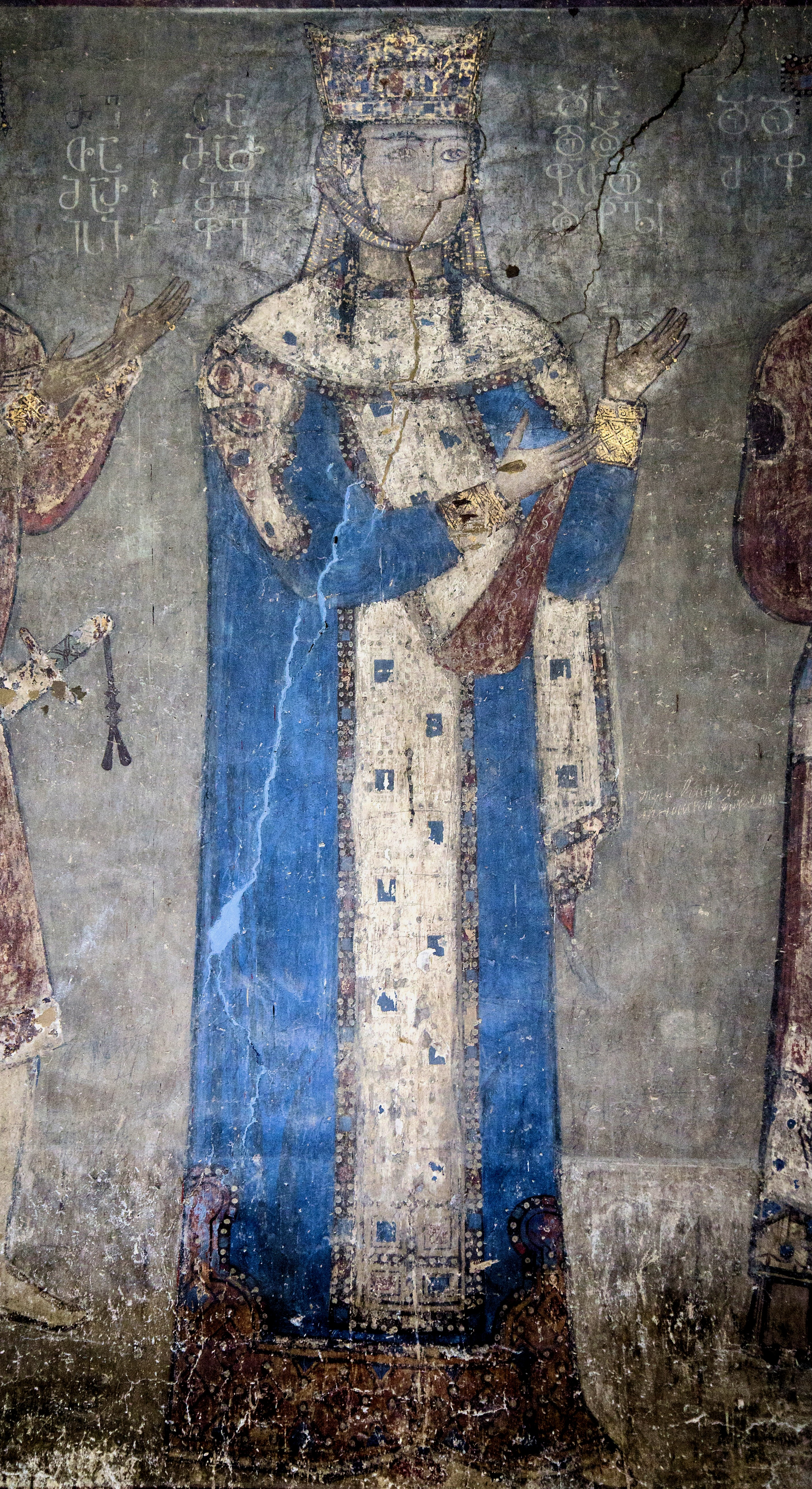
Queen Tamar of Georgia

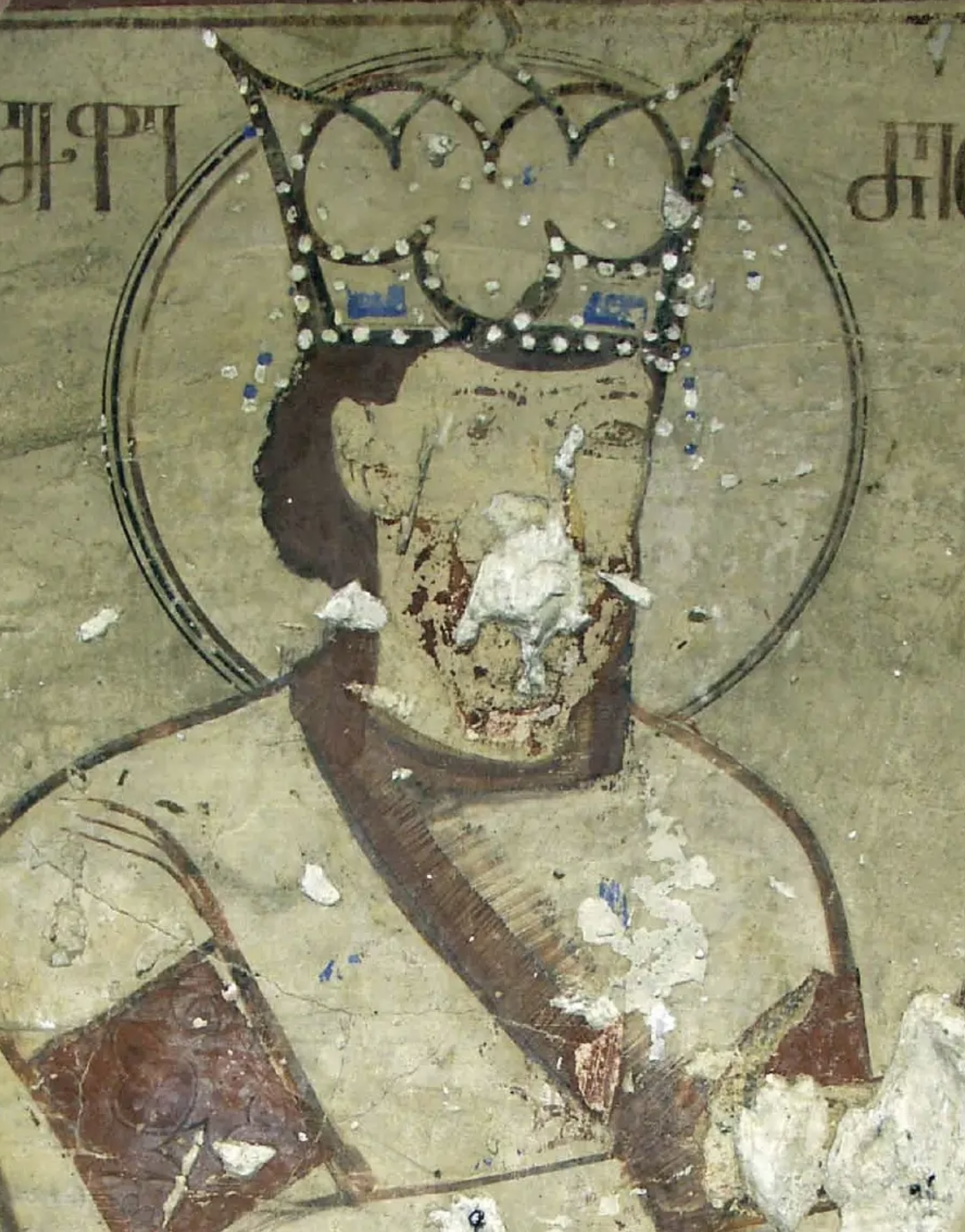
George IV (Lasha-Giorgi)

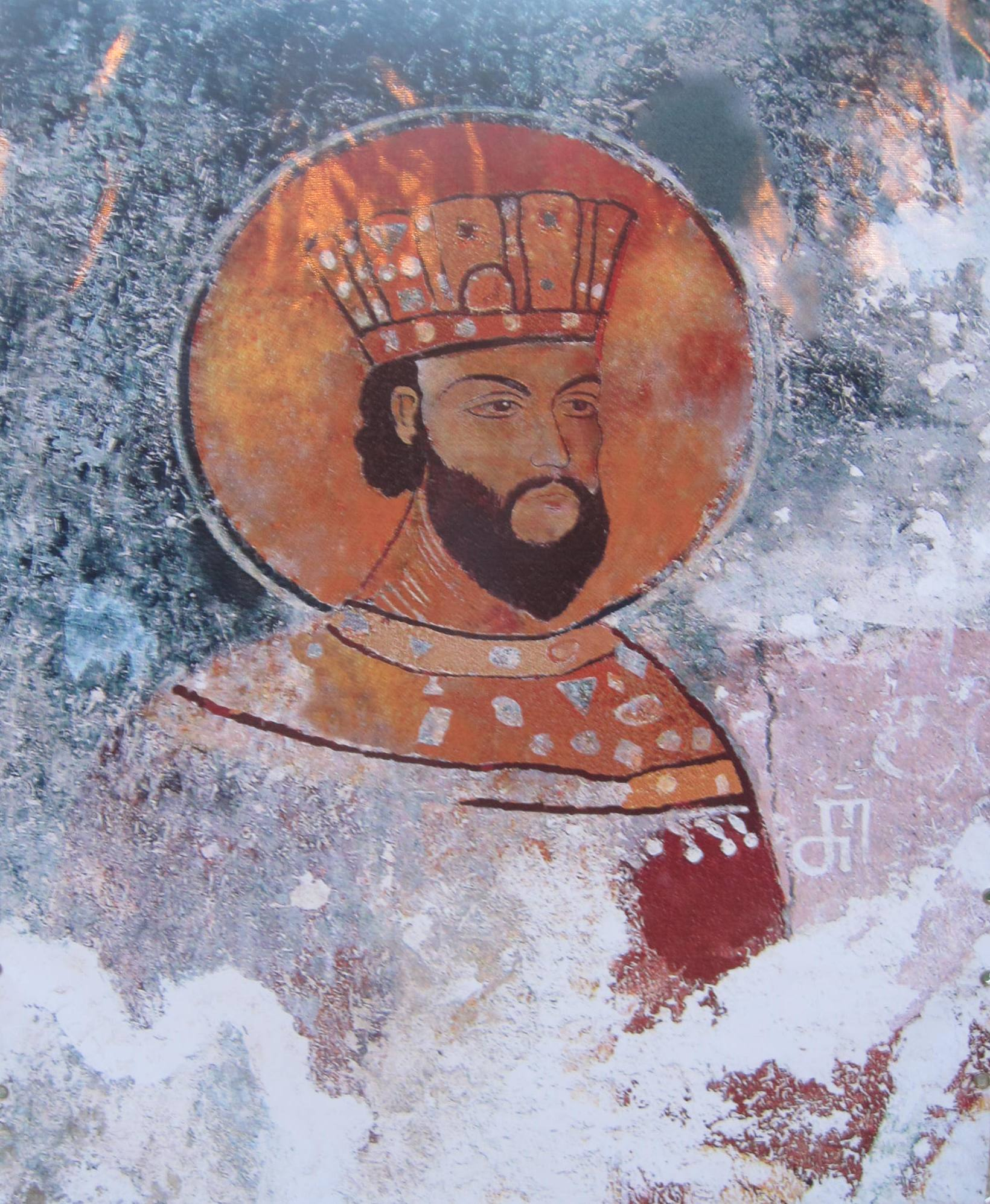
David VI of Georgia

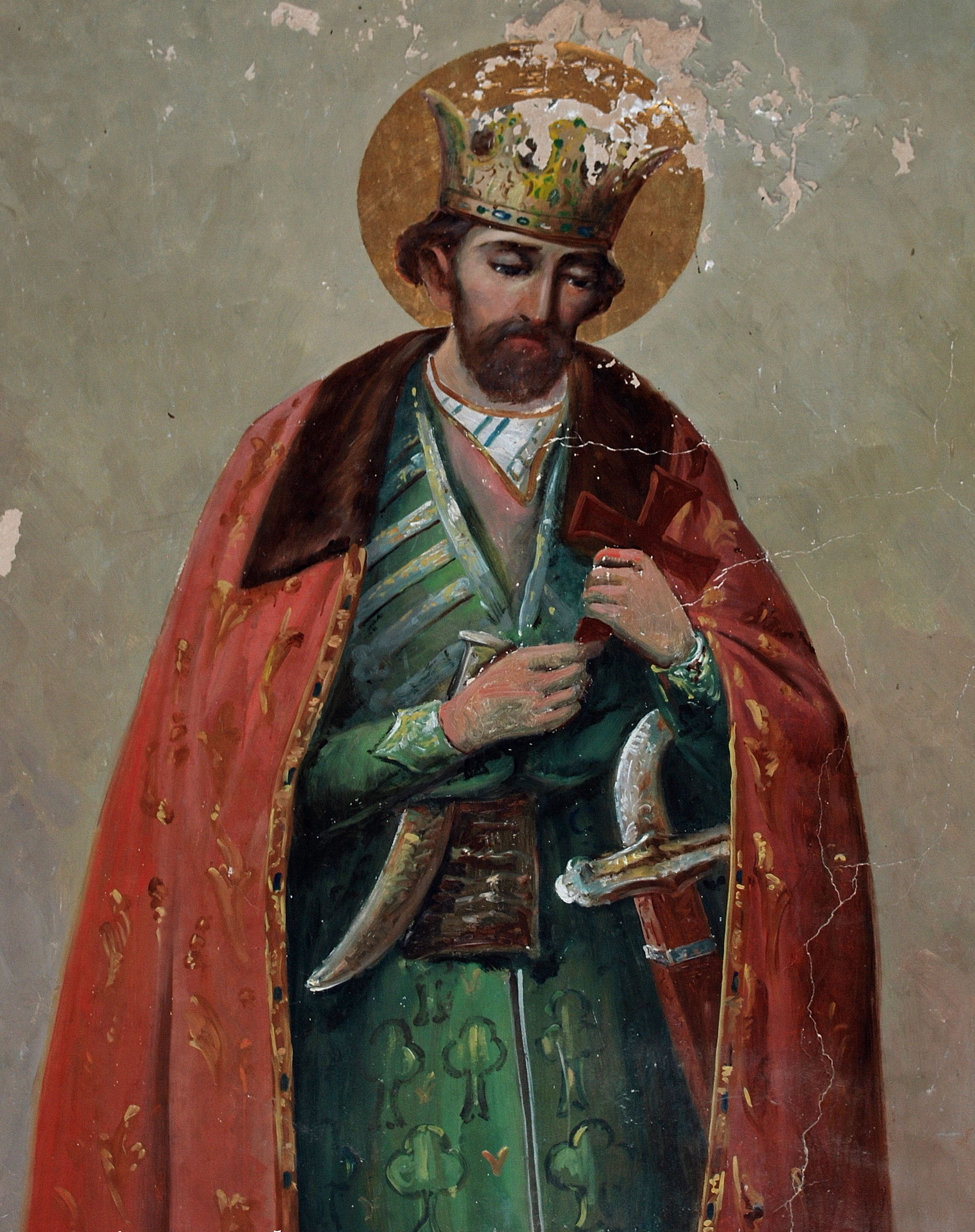
Luarsab II

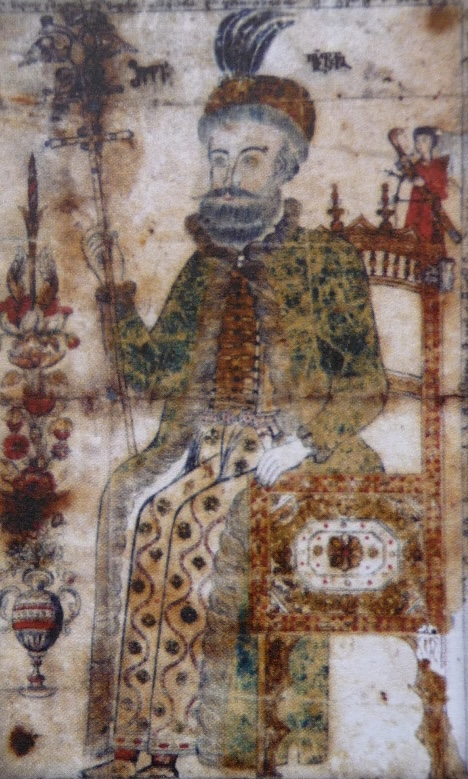
Vakhtang VI

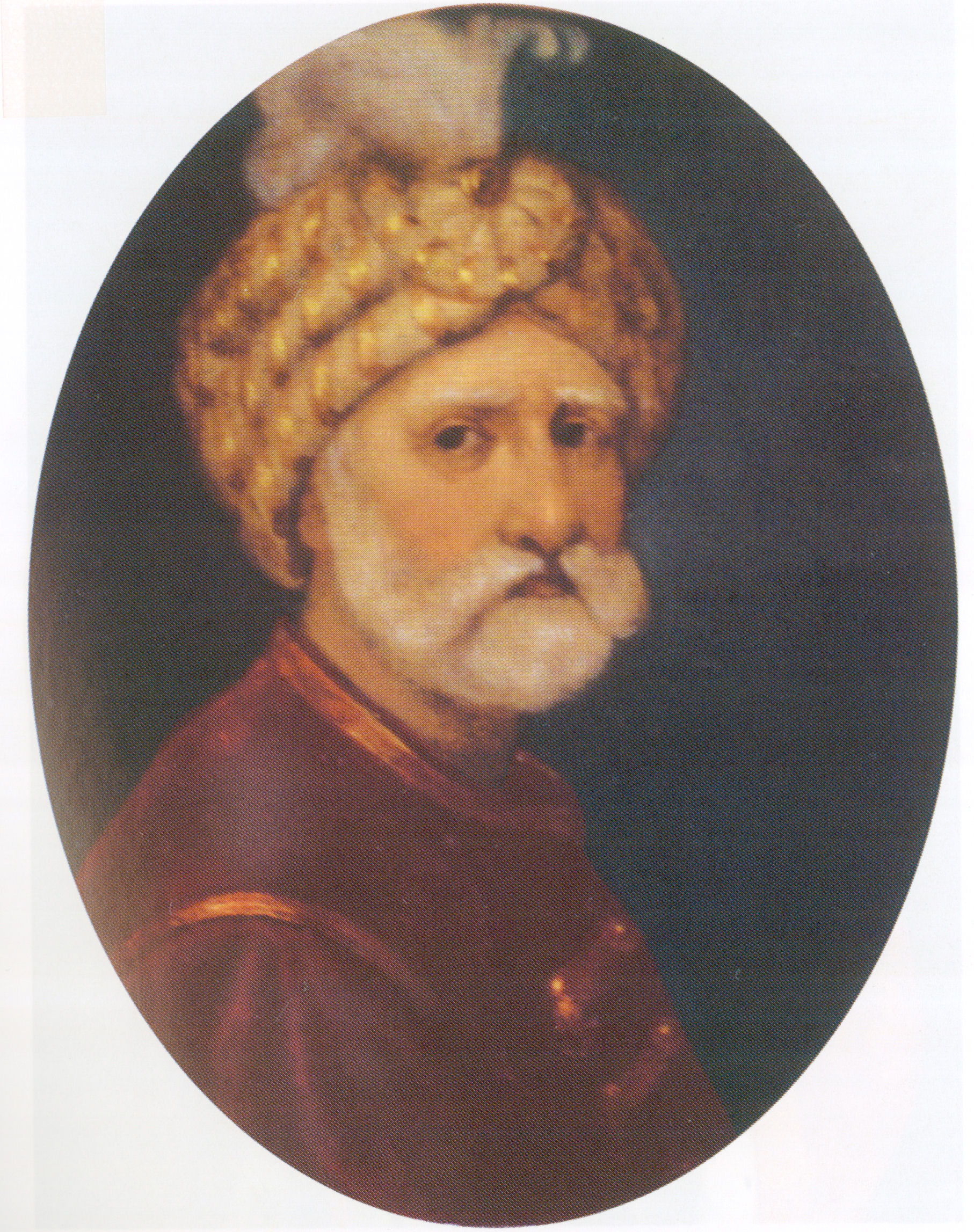
Teimuraz I

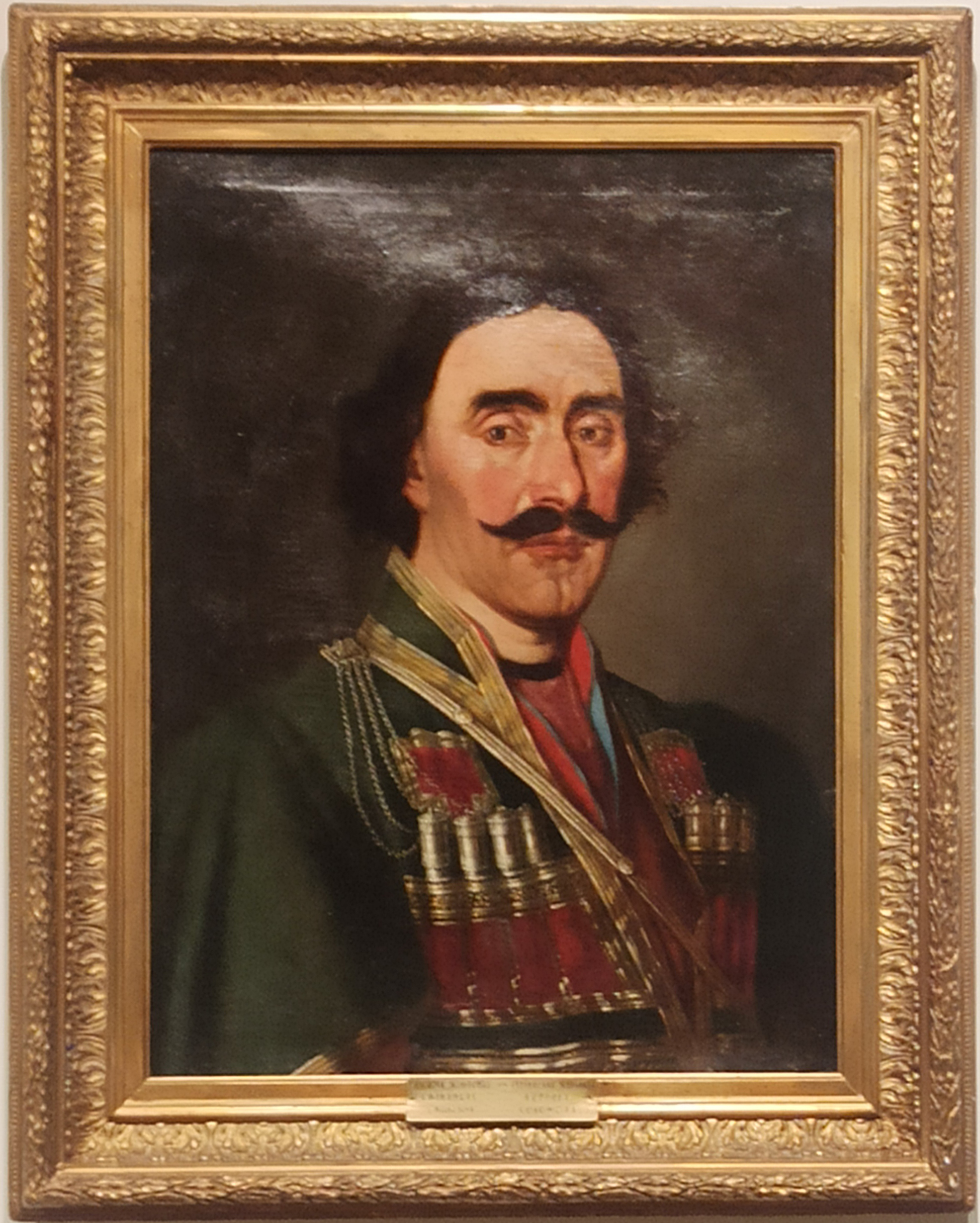
Solomon I of Imereti

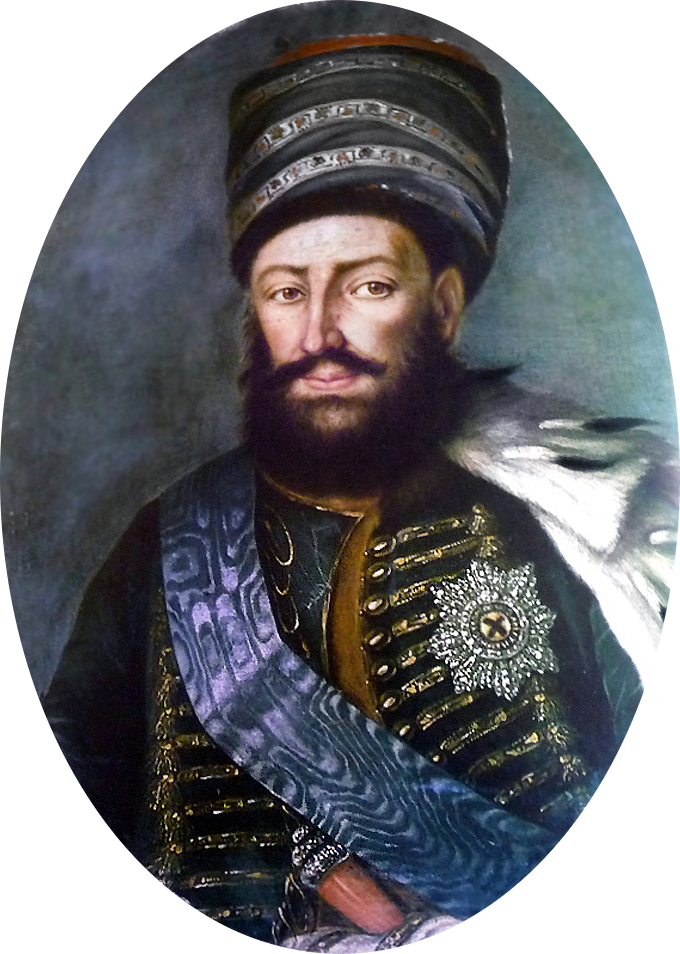
Heraclius II of Georgia

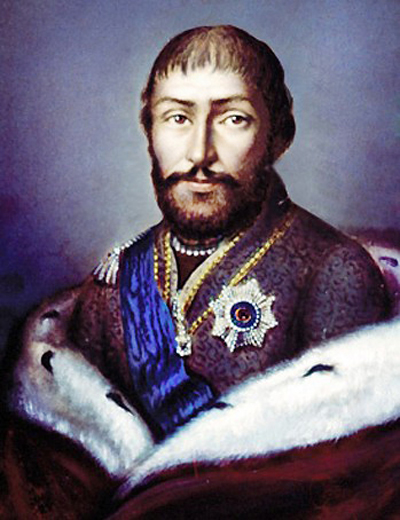
George XII

== See also ==
- Georgian monarchs family tree of Bagrationi dynasty of united Georgia
- Georgian monarchs family tree of Bagrationi dynasty of Kartli
- Georgian monarchs family tree of Bagrationi dynasty of Kakheti
- Georgian monarchs family tree of Bagrationi dynasty of Imereti
- Monarchism in Georgia

== Sources ==
- Baddeley, John F. (1999) [1908]. The Russian Conquest of the Caucasus. Foreword by Moshe Gammer. Routledge. ISBN 0-7007-0634-8.
- Hitchins, Keith (2013) [1998]. "Erekle II". In Yarshater, Ehsan (ed.). Encyclopædia Iranica (Online ed.). Encyclopædia Iranica Foundation.
- Kazemzadeh, Firuz (1991). "Iranian relations with Russia and the Soviet Union, to 1921". In Avery, P.; Hambly, G.; Melville, C. (eds.). The Cambridge History of Iran. Vol. 7. Cambridge University Press. ISBN 978-0521200950.
- Lang, David M. (1957). The last years of the Georgian Monarchy: 1658–1832. New York City: Columbia University Press.
- Mikaberidze, Alexander (2015). Historical Dictionary of Georgia (2nd ed.). Rowman & Littlefield. ISBN 9781442241459.
- Perry, John (1991). "The Zand dynasty". In Avery, P.; Hambly, G.; Melville, C. (eds.). The Cambridge History of Iran. Vol. 7: From Nadir Shah to the Islamic Republic. Cambridge University Press. pp. 63–104. ISBN 9780521200950.
- Rapp, Stephen H. (2003). Studies In Medieval Georgian Historiography: Early Texts And Eurasian Contexts. Corpus Scriptorum Christianorum Orientalium. Vol. 601. Peeters Publishers. ISBN 90-429-1318-5.
- Rota, Giorgio (2017). "Conversion to Islam (and sometimes a return to Christianity) in Safavid Persia in the sixteenth and seventeenth centuries". In Norton, Claire (ed.). Conversion and Islam in the Early Modern Mediterranean: The Lure of the Other. Routledge. ISBN 978-1317159797.
- Sanikidze, George (2021). "The Evolution of the Safavid Policy towards Eastern Georgia". In Melville, Charles (ed.). Safavid Persia in the Age of Empires, the Idea of Iran Vol. 10. Bloomsbury Publishing. ISBN 978-0755633807.
- Suny, Ronald Grigor (1994). The Making of the Georgian Nation. Indiana University Press. ISBN 978-0253209153.
