= David Bagration of Mukhrani =

Georgian royal; disputed head of the House of Bagrationi

David Bagration: დავით ბაგრატიონ-მუხრანელი
- Bagrationi in 2025

Head of the Royal House of Georgia (disputed)
- Tenure: 16 January 2008 – present
- Predecessor: Jorge de Bagration
- Heir apparent: Giorgi Bagrationi
- Born: 24 June 1976 (age 50); Madrid, Spain
- Spouse: Ana Bagration-Gruzinsky (m. 2009; div. 2013)
- Issue: Giorgi Bagrationi
- House: Bagrationi
- Father: Jorge de Bagration
- Mother: María de las Mercedes Zornoza y Ponce de León
- Religion: Georgian Orthodox Church

Prince David Bagrationi Mukhrani (Mukran-Batoni [მუხრანბატონი]) of Georgia, David Bagration de Moukhrani y Zornoza, or Davit Bagrationi-Mukhraneli (Georgian: დავით ბაგრატიონ-მუხრანელი; born 24 June 1976), is the Head of the Princely House of Mukhrani, a branch of the Georgian Bagrationi dynasty, and claims by primogeniture the headship of the Royal House of Bagrationi, which reigned in Georgia from the medieval era until the early 19th century. His family is related to the House of Bourbon-Anjou, the House of Wittelsbach, the House of Habsburg-Lorraine, and the House of Romanov. He succeeded his father Prince Giorgi (Jorge) Bagration Mukhrani as claimant to the Georgian throne upon his death on 16 January 2008.

Bagrationi returned his family to Georgia in 2003, ending decades of exile resulting from the 1921 Red Army invasion of Georgia. He married Princess Ana Bagration-Gruzinsky, a member of the genealogically junior Gruzinsky branch of the Bagrationi, in 2009, divorcing in 2013. Their son Prince Giorgi, born in Georgia in 2011 as the Pretender Crown Prince of the Mukhraneli, also became Pretender Crown Prince of the Gruzinsky branch in 2025, after his maternal grandfather Nugzar Bagration-Gruzinsky died and his mother became Pretender Queen of the Gruzinsky branch, due to its extinction in the male line.

== Early life ==
Bagrationi was born to the Georgian émigré family as the second son of Spanish race car driver Prince George Bagrationi-Mukhraneli, by his first wife María de las Mercedes Zornoza y Ponce de León (1942–2020) in Madrid, Spain. He has an older sister, Maria-Antonietta, and brother, Irakly, and a younger half-brother, Gourami (Ugo). Bagrationi is also a cousin of Grand Duchess Maria Vladimirovna of Russia, head of the Russian Imperial House, as her mother was born Princess Leonida Bagration of Mukhrani.

== Dynastic activities ==
Bagrationi settled permanently in Georgia's capital of Tbilisi in 2003 and obtained dual citizenship from Georgia in 2004. He has been an altar server to Ilia II, Catholicos-Patriarch of All Georgia.

In January 2008, Bagrationi announced his father's death, declaring himself to be his father's successor as the patrilineal head of the Georgian royal family while his elder brother, Irakly, continued to reside in Spain. As such his supporters recognize him as Royal Prince of Kartli and Hereditary Prince of the sovereign principality (satavado) of Mukhrani. Bagrationi's paternal grandfather, Prince Irakly Bagration-Mukhransky, had claimed headship of the Bagrationi dynasty in 1957 and, as such, the additional designations of Prince and Head of the Royal House of Georgia, of Kartalia, and of Mukhrani, Duke of the Lasos, Sovereign Head and Grand Master of the Order of the Eagle of Georgia and of the Order of the Queen-Saint Tamara, styles which his grandson also claims. As the Mukhrani line are related by marriage to the Spanish Royal family, Bagrationi was among the guests invited to King Felipe VI's 2014 enthronement as king.

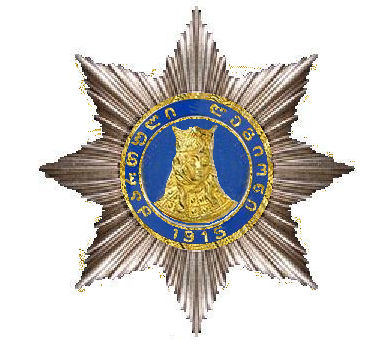
Order of the Saint Queen Tamar

During the Russia–Georgia war over South Ossetia in August 2008, Bagrationi accompanied Georgian soldiers to the front line to render moral support. He commented afterwards that he regretted Georgia "had to pay such a high price to show the world the true face of Russia", and issued a message to the Georgian nation. Bagrationi believes that restoration of monarchy in Georgia is not an option at this time because of ongoing Russian occupation of parts of the country; and it is up to the people of Georgia to decide when the monarchy should be restored.

During his second royal visit to the United Kingdom, on 8 March 2017, Bagrationi was received at Kensington Palace, where he presented the insignia of the Grand Collar of the Order of the Eagle of Georgia to Prince Richard, Duke of Gloucester and his wife Birgitte, Duchess of Gloucester on behalf of Queen Elizabeth II. On 16 December 2018 he was invited to the inauguration of Georgia's first female President, Salome Zourabichvili, He was the "First Godfather" at the marriage of Grand Duke George of Russia, heir to the last Tsar of Russia, to Victoria Bettarini; George's grandmother was the sister of Bagrationi's grandfather.

He has been involved in numerous Georgian cultural and other broadly humanitarian charities, including one of the largest fundraisers in GoFundMe history, when he joined with Instagram influencer Tommy Marcus (aka Qarantino) and UNWTO ambassador Shiv Shanker Nair to raise $7 million for the rescue of approximately 2000 Afghan reformers from the Taliban.

== Marriage and divorce ==
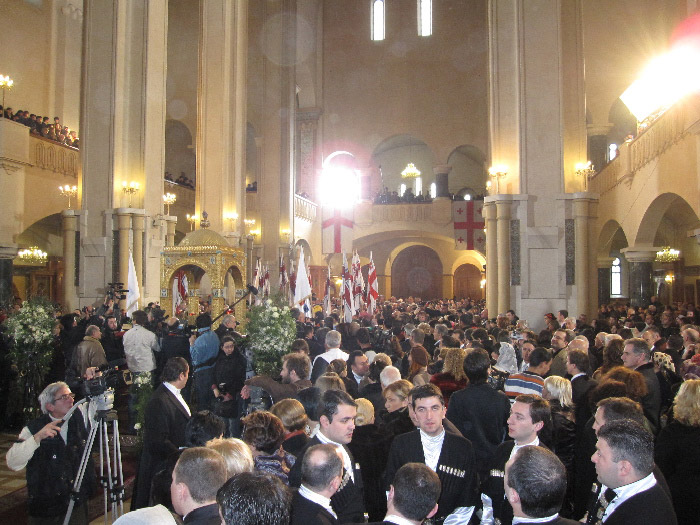
Wedding ceremony, Holy Trinity Cathedral, Tbilisi

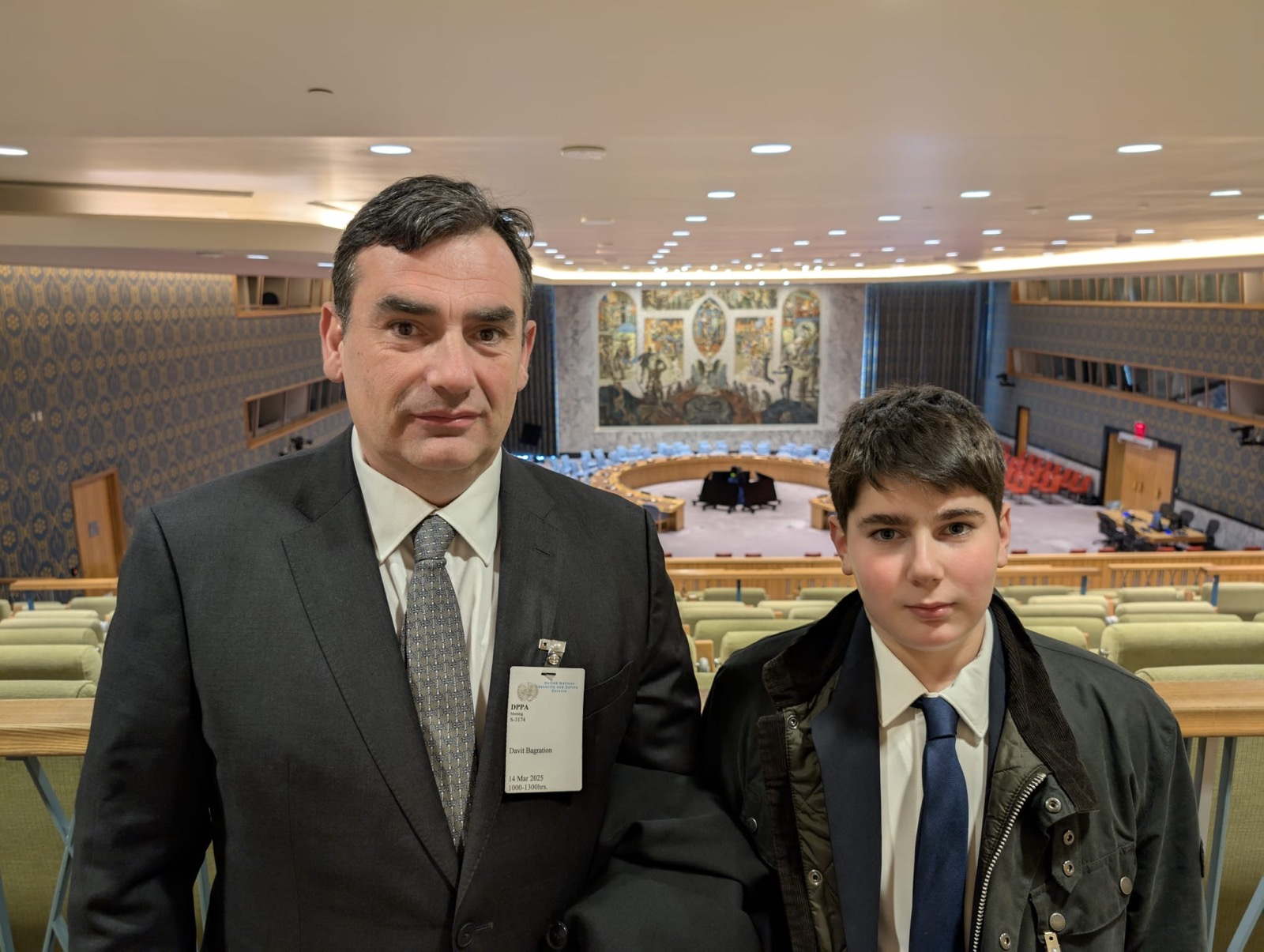
Bagrationi and his son Giorgi Bagrationi at the UN, 14 March 2025

Bagrationi married Princess Ana Bagration-Gruzinsky on 8 February 2009 at the Tbilisi Sameba Cathedral. The marriage had come to fruition with the support and blessing of the pro-monarchist Catholicos Patriarch of the Georgian Orthodox Church, Ilia II, and was officiated by two Bishops Metropolitan, Theodore and Gerasimos. It united the two branches of the Georgian former royal family with competing claims to the throne of Georgia, Gruzinsky and Mukhrani. The dynastic significance of the wedding lay in the fact that, amid the turmoil in political partisanship that has roiled Georgia since its independence in 1991, Patriarch Ilia II publicly called for restoration of the monarchy as a path toward national unity in October 2007. Without naming any preferred claimant, prior to Prince David and Princess Ana's wedding, he had emphasized the need to prepare the populace for restoration of the monarchy, "and elect a Bagration, to be educated from childhood" to take the crown. Although this led some politicians and parties to entertain the notion of a Georgian constitutional monarchy, competition arose among the old dynasty's princes and supporters, as historians and jurists debated which Bagrationi had the strongest hereditary right to a throne that has been vacant since the 1800s. Although some Georgian monarchists support the Gruzinsky branch's claim, others support that of the repatriated Mukhrani branch. Both branches descend in unbroken, legitimate male line from the medieval kings of Georgia down to King Constantine II of Georgia, who died in 1505. Whereas the Bagration-Mukhrani (Bagrationi-Mukhraneli) was a cadet branch of the former Royal House of Kartli, it became the genealogically senior line of the Bagrationi dynasty in the early 20th century. The elder branch had lost the kingship of Kartli by 1724; meanwhile, the Bagration-Gruzinsky line, although junior to the Mukhrani genealogically, reigned over the kingdom of Kakheti, re-united the two eastern Georgian realms in the kingdom of Kartli-Kakheti in 1762, and did not lose sovereignty until Russian annexation in 1801.

Bagrationi is the only member of his branch who retains Georgian citizenship and residence since the death of his father in 2008. Aside from his unmarried elder brother, he is senior in male-line descent of the Bagrationi family, while Ana's father, Prince Nugzar Bagration-Gruzinsky, is the only remaining prince descended in the male line from George XII, the last king to reign over the united Kartli and Kakheti kingdom. The marriage between Nugzar Gruzinsky's heiress and the Mukhrani heir potentially resolves their rivalry for the claim to the throne, which had divided Georgian monarchists.

There were reports of marital discord in 2009. In December 2009, in a Georgian version of The Moment of Truth on Imedi TV, the Georgian actress Shorena Begashvili admitted to having an affair with Bagrationi. Georgian Interior Minister Vano Merabishvili alleged in an interview published by Russian newspaper Kommersant on 7 April 2010 that their marital union had been arranged with the primary purpose of promoting the restoration of the Georgian monarchy under the Bagrationi. Therefore, according to Merabishvili, Ana Bagration-Gruzinsky was forced to divorce her first husband, Grigol Malania, in order to allow her to wed Bagrationi. At that time Merabishvili claimed that the Bagrationi couple were no longer married. However it was rumored by the Georgian press that the couple had reconciled and was expecting their first child.

The couple are said to have retaken their marital vows in a civil ceremony on 12 November 2010 in Madrid.

The couple's only child, a son, Giorgi, was born in Madrid on 27 September 2011 and baptized by Patriarch Ilia II at the Svetitskhoveli Cathedral in Mtskheta on 3 November 2013.

On 15 December 2013, an official statement from Bagrationi posted on the website "Royal House of Georgia" confirmed his divorce from Ana. Giorgi remains the only son of David and Ana, who have both not married again.

Following Prince Nugzar's death in 2025, Bagrationi's former wife Ana became his rival pretender due to the Gruzinsky branch going extinct in the male line. Their son Prince Giorgi subsequently became heir apparent to both of his parents.

== Ancestors ==
Ancestors of David Bagration of Mukhrani

16. Alexander, Prince Bagration of Mukhrani
8. George, Prince Bagration of Mukhrani
17. Maria Dmitrievna Golovatcheva
4. Irakli, Prince Bagration of Mukhrani
18. Sigismund Nowina Złotnicki
9. Helena Nowina Złotnicka
19. Princess Maria Elisabarowna Eristavi of Ksani
2. Jorge, Prince Bagration of Mukhrani
20. Carisio Pasquini
10. Ugo Pasquini, Count di Costafiorita
21. Caterina Mancini
5. Maria Antonietta Pasquini dei Conti di Costafiorita
22. Francesco Antonio Gastaldi
11. Enrichetta Albertina Cesira Gastaldi
23. Augusta Petrini
1. David Bagration of Mukhrani
6. José de Zornoza
3. María de las Mercedes Zornoza y Ponce de León
7. María de los Dolores Ponce de León y Puicercus

== Honours ==
=== Dynastic orders of knighthood ===
- (Georgia (country)) Bagrationi Dynasty (Royal House of Georgia): Grand Master of the Order of the Eagle of Georgia
- (Georgia (country)) Bagrationi Dynasty (Royal House of Georgia): Grand Master of the Order of Queen Tamar
- Royal House of Portugal: Grand Cross of the Order of the Immaculate Conception of Vila Viçosa
- House of Petrovic-Njegos, Montenegro: Knight Grand Cross of Order of Prince Danilo I
- (Italy) Royal House of Savoy: Grand Cross of the Order of Saints Maurice and Lazarus
- Imperial House of Ethiopia: Grand Cross of the Order of the Seal of Solomon
- (Sulu Sultanate) Royal house of Sulu: Grand Cordon of the Royal and Hashemite Order of the Pearl

=== Other ===
- Spain (military, Civil Guard): Medal of the Centennial of the Virgen del Pilar - Medalla del Centenario de la Virgen del Pilar
- United States (Veterans and Hereditary Association): Military Order of Foreign Wars
- United Kingdom (Charitable Order): Badge of the Order of Mercy
- Ecumenical Patriarchate: Gold medal of the Metropolis of the Princes' Islands
- (Serbia) Centre for Development of Šajkaška: Cross of Vozhd Djordje Stratimirovich
- Spain (military): Knight of the Order of the Spanish Legion
- Sweden: Grand Commander of the Grand Order of the Amaranth
- (Spain) Protector of the Royal Corps of the Nobility of the Principality of Asturias
- Knight Grand Cross of the Order of St. Lazarus, Malta-Paris Obedience.

== See also ==
- Monarchism of Georgia
- Georgian monarchs family tree of Bagrationi dynasty

David Bagration of Mukhrani House of Mukhrani Born: 24 June 1976
Titles in pretence
Preceded by Jorge de Bagration	— TITULAR — Pretender of the throne of Georgia disputed with Ana; 16 January 2008 – present	Incumbent; Heir: Giorgi Bagrationi
