= Nugzar Bagration-Gruzinsky =

Georgian royal; disputed head of the House of Bagrationi (1950–2025)

Prince Nugzar Bagration-Gruzinsky: ნუგზარ ბაგრატიონ-გრუზინსკი
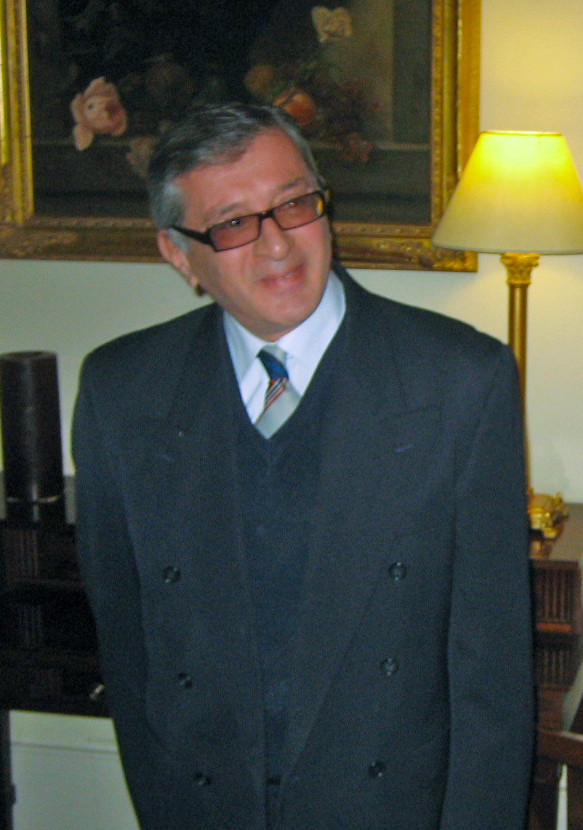
- Nugzar in 2010

Head of the Royal House of Georgia (disputed)
- Tenure: 13 August 1984 – 1 March 2025
- Predecessor: Petre Gruzinsky
- Successor: Ana Bagration-Gruzinsky
- Born: 25 August 1950; Tbilisi, Georgian SSR, USSR
- Died: 1 March 2025 (aged 74); Tbilisi, Georgia
- Spouse: Leila Kipiani (m. 1971)
- Issue: Ana Bagration-Gruzinsky; Maia Bagration-Gruzinsky
Names
- Nugzar Petres dze Bagrationi-Gruzinsky
- House: Bagrationi
- Father: Petre Gruzinsky
- Mother: Liya Mgeladze
- Religion: Georgian Orthodox Church
- Khelrtva

Prince Nugzar Petres dze Bagration-Gruzinsky (Georgian: ნუგზარ პეტრეს ძე ბაგრატიონ-გრუზინსკი; 25 August 1950 – 1 March 2025) was a Georgian theatrical director and head of the princely House of Gruzinsky and represented its disputed claim to the former crown of Georgia.

== Biography ==
Prince Nugzar was the son of Prince Petre Bagration-Gruzinsky of Georgia (1920–1984), a prominent poet and claimant to the headship of the Georgian dynasty from 1939 until his death, by his second wife, Liya Mgeladze (b. 8 August 1926). Prince Nugzar was the director of the Tbilisi theatre of cinema artists.

On 18 December 2007, Nugzar met with Kristiina Ojuland, the Vice-President of the Riigikogu (Parliament of Estonia) at the Marriott-Tbilisi Hotel in which Ojuland "paid homage to the Bagrationi dynasty, which has made an extraordinary contribution in support of Georgia".

Prince Nugzar was the senior descendant by primogeniture in the male line of George XII, the last King of the eastern Georgian Kingdom of Kartli-Kakheti to reign.

Prince Nugzar died on 1 March 2025, at the age of 74.

== Family ==
Nugzar married Leila Kipiani (b. Tbilisi 16 July 1947), an actress, on 10 February 1971, and they have two daughters:

- Princess Ana Bagration-Gruzinsky, b. Tbilisi 1 November 1976. Married firstly to Grigoriy Malania and had two daughters with him, Irina and Mariam Bagration-Gruzinsky, and secondly, to Prince David Bagration of Mukhrani with whom she has a son, Prince Giorgi Bagrationi (see below). She became the Heiress General of the Gruzinsky branch on Nugzar's death.
- Princess Maia Bagration-Gruzinsky, b. Tbilisi 2 January 1978. She married Nikolai Chichinadze and has two children with him, Themour and Ana Chichinadze.

As Nugzar had no male issue, Yevgeny Petrovich Gruzinsky (born 1947–died 17 July 2018), the great-great grandson of Bagrat's younger brother Ilia (1791–1854), who lived in the Russian Federation, was considered to be Nugzar's heir presumptive within the primogeniture principle. Yevgeny died without issue. Nugzar himself argued in favor of having his elder daughter, Ana, designated as his heir in accordance with the Georgian dynastic law of "Zedsidzeoba" according to which every child of Princess Ana would inherit eligibility for dynastic succession through their mother, thus continuing the elder line of George XII.

== Dynastic marriage of the Gruzinsky and Mukhrani heirs ==
Princess Ana Bagration-Gruzinski, daughter of Prince Nugzar Bagration-Gruzinski and direct descendant of King George XII, the last reigning monarch of the Kingdom of Kartli-Kakheti, married Prince David Bagration of Mukhrani, on 8 February 2009 at the Tbilisi Sameba Cathedral. The marriage united the Gruzinsky and Mukhrani branches of the Georgian royal family, and drew a crowd of 3,000 spectators, officials, and foreign diplomats, as well as extensive coverage by the Georgian media.

The dynastic significance of the wedding lay in the fact that, amidst the turmoil in political partisanship that has roiled Georgia since its independence in 1991, Patriarch Ilia II of Georgia publicly called for restoration of the monarchy as a path toward national unity in October 2007. Although this led some politicians and parties to entertain the notion of a Georgian constitutional monarchy, competition arose among the old dynasty's princes and supporters, as historians and jurists debated which Bagrationi has the strongest hereditary right to a throne that has been vacant for two centuries. Although some Georgian monarchists support the Gruzinsky branch's claim, which descends directly from the last reigning monarch of Georgia, others support the recently repatriated Mukhrani branch, a historically cadet branch. While both branches descend from the Bagrationi medieval kings of Georgia down to Constantine II of Georgia who died in 1505., only the Gruzinsky branch maintained royal sovereignty until the Russian annexation in 1801."

Whereas the Bagration-Mukhrani were a cadet branch of the former Royal House of Kartli, they were considered the genealogically senior in the agnatic sense by the early 20th century: yet the elder branch had lost the rule of Kartli by 1724. Meanwhile, the Bagration-Gruzinsky line, although junior in terms of agnatic distance, reigned over the Kingdom of Kakheti, re-united the two realms in the kingdom of Kartli-Kakheti in 1762, and did not lose sovereignty until Russian annexation in 1801.

Prince Giorgi, the son of David and Ana, was born on 27 September 2011 in Madrid, Spain. Nugzar did not officially recognize his grandson as heir to the Georgian throne. He continued to demand that David sign a written agreement in which he would recognize Nugzar and the Gruzinsky branch as the sole rightful heir to the Georgian throne and to the legacy of the Georgian kings.

Nevertheless, in 2013, Prince Giorgi returned to Georgia with his mother and father and was baptised by Patriarch Ilia II of Georgia at the cathedral in Mtskheta. This service was attended by Prince Nugzar, who after the christening of his grandson said:

Prince Giorgi is the direct descendant of the last king of united Georgia, George VIII of Georgia and the last king of Kartli-Kakheti George XII of Georgia through his mother's side and we have a big hope that he will get the royal dignity from his mother in the future.

== Honours ==
=== Foreign honours ===
- Rwandan Royal Family: Knight Grand Cross with Collar of the Royal Order of the Drum

== Ancestors ==
Ancestors of Nugzar Bagration-Gruzinsky

16. Prince Bagrat of Georgia
8. Alexander, Prince Bagration-Gruzinsky
17. Princess Ketevan Cholokashvili
4. Petre, Prince Bagration-Gruzinsky
18. Prince Zakhari Tarkhan-Mouravi
9. Princess Elene Tarkhan-Mouravi
2. Petre, Prince Bagration-Gruzinsky
10. Alexander Dekanozishvili
5. Tamara Dekanozishvili
1. Prince Nugzar Bagration-Gruzinsky
6. Dmitri Mgeladze
3. Liya Mgeladze

== See also ==
- Georgian monarchs family tree of Bagrationi dynasty

== Sources ==
1. W.E.D. Allen, A History of the Georgian People, from the beginning down to the Russian conquest in the nineteenth century. Kegan Paul, Trench, Trubner & Co., Ltd., London, 1932.
2. Almanach de Gotha, annuaire généalogique, diplomatique et statistique. Justus Perthes, Gotha, 1826–1944.
3. I.L. Bichikashvili, D.V. Ninidze and A.N. Peikrishvili, The Genealogy of the Bagratides. Tiflis, 1995
4. M.L. Bierbrier, "The Descendants of Theodora Comnena of Trebizond". The Genealogist, Volumes 11, No. 2, Fall 1997 to 14, No. 1, Spring 2000 (inclusive). American Society of Genealogists, Picton Press, Rockport, ME.
5. M. Brosset (ed.), Rapporta sur un Voyage Archéologique dans la Géorgie et dans l'Arménie exécute en 1847–1848. L'académie Impériale des Sciences, St.- Pétersbourg, 1849 [British Library Shelfmark 1269.dd.10]
6. Marie-Félicité Brosset, Histoire de la Géorgie, depuis la'antiquité jusqu'au XIXe siècle, traduite du Géorgien. L'académie Impériale des Sciences, St.- Pétersbourg, 1856.
7. Marie-Félicité Brosset, "Inscriptions tumulaires géorgiennes de Moscou et de St.-Pètersbourg". Mémoires de l'Académie Impériale des Sciences de Saint-Pètersbourg. Sixième série. Sciences politiques, histoire et philologie. Tome IV. L'académie Impériale des Sciences, St.- Pétersbourg, 1840 pp. 461–521. [British Library shelfmark Ac. 1125/2]
8. Marie-Félicité Brosset, "Nouvelles rescherches sur l'histoire Wakhoucht, sur le roi Artchil et sa famille, et sur divers personages géorgiens enterrés à Moscou". Mélanges Asiatiques, Vol. III, l'Académie Impériale des Sciences, St Petersburg, 1859. pp. 534–575. [British Library shelfmark Ac. 1125/11]
9. Burke's Royal Families of the World, Volume II Africa & the Middle East, Burke's Peerage Ltd., London 1980.
10. Stanislav Dumin, "Tsars and Tsarevitchs of the United Kakheti and Kartli. T.S.H. Princes Gruzinsky", The Families of the Nobility of the Russian Empire, Volume III, Moscow, 1996.
11. Jacques Ferrand, Les Families Princieres de l'Ancien Empire de Russie en émigration. 3 parts. Montreuil, France, 1978.
12. Giorgi Gabeskiria. Georgian History. National Parliamentary Library of Georgia/Electronic Text Center, Tbilisi, 2001.
13. A. Gugushvili, "The Chronological-Genealogical Table of the Kings of Georgia". Georgica. Volume 1, Nos. 2 & 3, pp. 106–153. The Georgian Historical Society, London, October 1936.
14. János József Gudenus, Magyar családtorténeti adattár. Petófi Irodalmi Múzeum, Budapest. Internet, 2006.
15. Nicolas Ikonnikov, la Noblesse de Russie. Deuxième Edition. Paris, 1958.
16. Davit Marshal Lang, The Last Years of the Georgian Monarchy, 1658–1632. Columbia University Press, New York, 1957.
17. "Oukase Impérial réglant le titre et le raing des princes Géorgiens domiciliés en Russie". Journal Asiatique. Troisième série, Tome 1, Fevrier 1836, pp. 205–207. Société Asiatique, Paris, 1836.
18. S. Quakhchishvili (ed.), The Georgian Chronicle: the Period of Giorgi Lasha. Adolf M. Hakkert, Amsterdam, 1991.
19. Nino Salia, "le martyr de la reine Kéthévan de Georgie", Bedi Karthlisa "Le Destin de la Georgie", Revue de Karthvelologie, No 23 (N.S.), pp. 55–57, Paris, January 1957.
20. Kalistrat Salia and Katharine Vivian (trans.), History of the Georgian Nation. Paris, 1983.
21. Mihail-Dimitri Sturdza, Dictionnaire historique et génealgique des grandes familles de Grèce, d'Albanie et de Constantinople. Paris, 1999.
22. Cyril Toumanoff, "The Fifteenth-Century Bagratides and the Institution of Collegial Sovereignty in Georgia". Traditio. Volume VII, Fordham University Press, New York 1949–1951, pp. 169–221.
23. Cyrille Toumanoff, Manuel de généalogie et de chronologie pour l'histoire de la Caucasie Chrétienne (Arménie-Géorgie-Albanie). Edizioni Aquila, Roma, 1976.
24. Tsarévitch Wakhoucht (Prince Vakusht), Description géographique de la Géorgie. L'Académie Impérial des Sciences, St Pétersbourg, 1842.

Nugzar Bagration-Gruzinsky House of Gruzinsky Born: 25 August 1950 Died: 1 March 2025
Titles in pretence
Preceded by Peter Bagration-Gruzinsky	— TITULAR — Pretender of the throne of Georgia disputed with David; 1984–2025	Succeeded by Ana Bagration-Gruzinsky
