= Giorgi Sanikidze =

Professor and writer

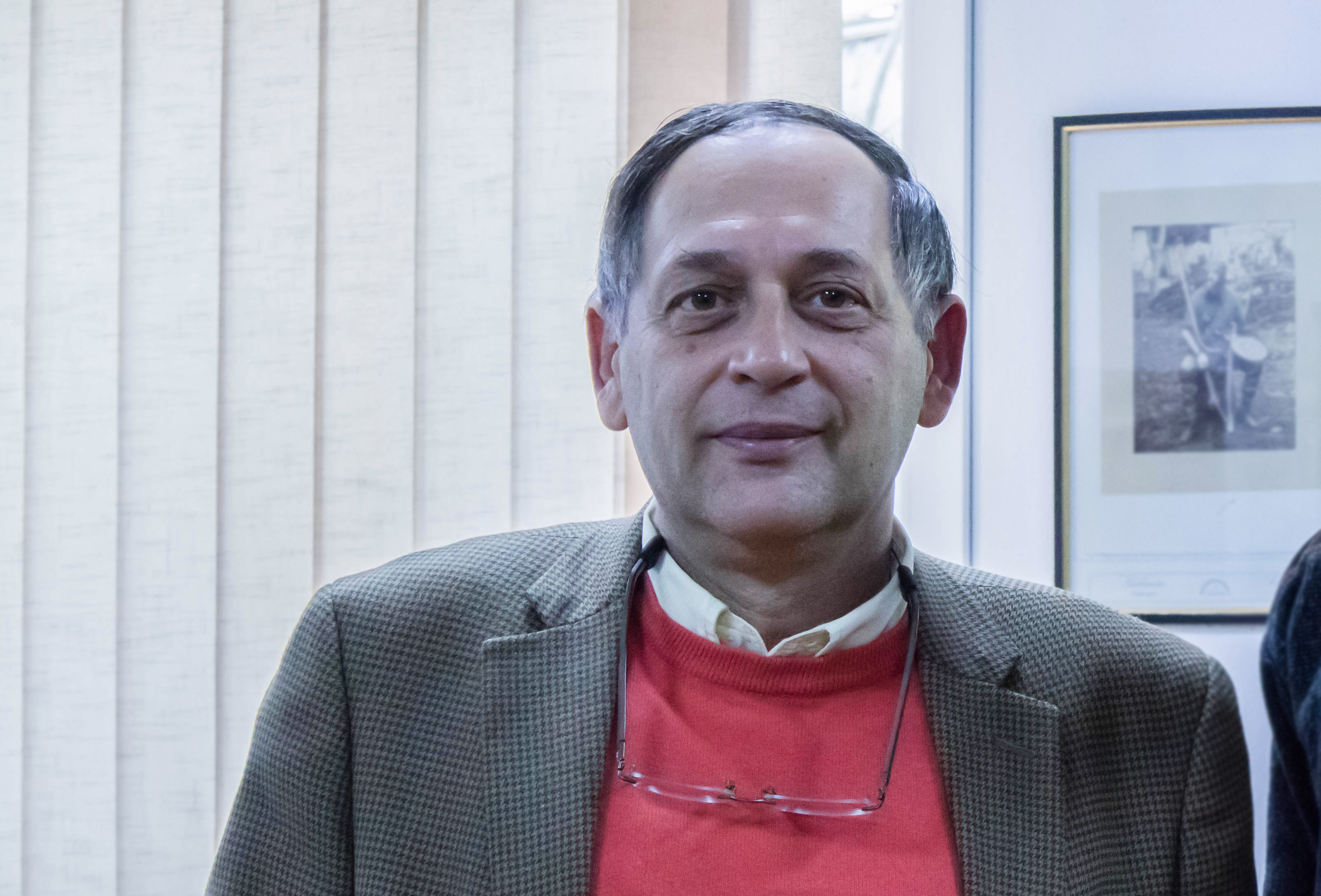
Prof. Giorgi Sanikidze

Giorgi Sanikidze (Georgian: გიორგი სანიკიძე; born 1962) is a professor and writer, specialising in Middle Eastern history and politics, particularly Iran. He graduated from the State University of Tbilisi in 1984, at the Faculty of Oriental Studies.

Since 1986, he has worked at the Institute for Oriental Studies at G. Tsereteli Institute. From 1996 to 2002, he was chairman of the Eastern European History School at the Asia-Africa Institute in Tbilisi. He received his undergraduate degree in 1990 and his doctorate in 2001.

He has written in more than 50 scientific publications (published in 9 countries), as well as several textbooks and articles in the Georgian press. He has participated in more than 70 scientific associations.

== Awards ==
He received the 2012 Farabi International Award for Islamic and Iranian Studies (sponsored by UNESCO).

== Research interests ==
History and politics of the Middle East countries (especially Iran); Georgia-Caucasus interactions with Middle Eastern countries; problems related to Islam and Islamic movements; East-East questions and East-West interactions; Middle East historiography.
