= Ana Bagration-Gruzinsky =

Georgian princess (born 1976)

Princess Ana Bagration-Gruzinsky
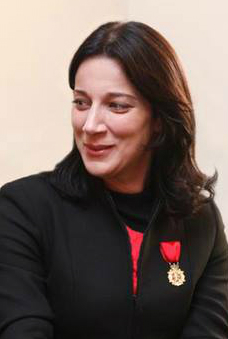

Head of the Royal House of Georgia (disputed)
- Tenure: 1 March 2025 – present
- Predecessor: Nugzar Bagration-Gruzinsky
- Heir apparent: Giorgi Bagrationi

Consort to the Head of the Royal House of Georgia (disputed)
- Tenure: 8 February 2009–15 December 2013
- Born: 1 November 1976 (age 49); Tbilisi, Georgian SSR, USSR (now Georgia)
- Spouse: Grigoriy Malania (m. 2001; div. 2007) David Bagration of Mukhrani (m. 2009; div. 2013)
- Issue: Irina Bagration-Gruzinsky; Mariam Bagration-Gruzinsky; Giorgi Bagrationi
Names
- Ana Nugzaris asuli Bagration-Gruzinsky
- House: Bagrationi
- Father: Nugzar Bagration-Gruzinsky
- Mother: Leila Kipiani
- Religion: Georgian Orthodox Church
- Khelrtva

Princess Ana Bagration-Gruzinsky (Georgian: ანა ბაგრატიონ-გრუზინსკი; born 1 November 1976) is a royal princess and senior heir of the Gruzinsky branch of the Bagrationi dynasty, which is one of the two branches that claim the right to the crown of Georgia. The other claimant is her former husband David Bagration of Mukhrani, with whom she had a son Giorgi, who is their common heir apparent.

== Early life and career ==
Princess Ana was the eldest child of the head of the Bagration-Gruzinsky family, Prince Nugzar Bagration-Gruzinsky (1950–2025), and his wife, Leila, scion of the noble Kipiani family, and a former actress. Ana has one younger sister, Princess Maia Bagration-Gruzinsky, born on 2 January 1978.

Originally a journalist, Princess Ana more recently worked as a teacher in a Tbilisi school.

Princess Ana attended Tbilisi State University.

== Marriages and children ==
=== First marriage ===
Princess Ana Bagration-Gruzinsky was firstly married civilly and religiously on 17 May 2001 to Grigoriy Malania (born in 1970). Malania, an architect, is the son of Grigoriy Malania (1947-2009) and Nana Mgaloblishvili (born in 1951). Through his mother, Grigoriy Malania is a descendant of the last king of Georgia, George XII. He was accorded the day of his religious marriage the courtesy title of Prince and the status of member of the royal house of Bagrationi by his then-father-in-law.

Princess Ana and Grigoriy Malania had two daughters, who, with the agreement of their father, bear the surname of their mother:

1. Princess Irina Bagration-Gruzinsky (born in 2003).
1. Princess Mariam Bagration-Gruzinsky (born in 2007).

The marriage of Princess Ana Bagration-Gruzinsky and Grigoriy Malania was dissolved by divorce in 2007.

=== Second marriage ===
In a lavish ceremony attended by over 3,000 guests, Princess Ana Bagration-Gruzinsky was secondly married on 8 February 2009 at the Holy Trinity Cathedral of Tbilisi to a distant cousin, Prince David Bagration of Mukhrani. On the wedding day, Princess Ana told Georgian television channel Rustavi 2 that "I hope that this (day) will be the happiest of my life." Her father, Prince Nugzar, was also quoted as saying, "The most important thing is that this day will be beneficial for Georgia's future."

The wedding received the blessing of Patriarch Ilia II of Georgia, who was very supportive of the joining of the Bagration-Gruzinsky and Bagration-Mukhransky lines. Reports also surfaced that the Patriarch hoped that any son born of the union of Princess Ana and Prince David would become the first post-Soviet monarch of Georgia. The marriage was also hailed by Georgian monarchists hoping for the establishment of a constitutional monarchy under the Bagrationi dynasty.

Princess Ana and Prince David separated within months of their nuptials. Allegations arose that members of the Georgian government conspired to thwart the patriarch's hopes by encouraging Georgian model Shorena Begashvili to undermine the marriage by seducing Prince David, and she subsequently admitted having an affair with him. Their first marriage was dissolved in August 2009. The couple subsequently reconciled and contracted a civil marriage in Spain on 12 November 2010.

Princess Ana Bagration-Gruzinsky and Prince David Bagration-Mukhransky had one son:

1. Prince Giorgi Bagrationi (27 September 2011).

The second divorce of Princess Ana and Prince David took place on 15 December 2013. Princess Ana received custody of their son, Prince Giorgi.

== Recent activities ==
Princess Ana has shown an interest in the socioeconomic issues affecting vulnerable segments of the Georgian population. Working with Heifer International and other local NGOs, she is seeking to ameliorate the living conditions of internally displaced persons, especially those affected by the Russo-Georgian War. The humanitarian efforts of Princess Ana have met with cooperation from members of the governments of Georgia and the Autonomous Republic of Abkhazia.

== Gruzinsky Heiress ==
Her father died on 1 March 2025 as the last male member of the dynastically senior reigning line from King George XII. Prior to his death he named Ana as his designated successor. she is therefore the head of the Royal House of Georgia.

Princess Anna's role as Heir to the Throne and Head of the Royal House was acknowledged on May 12, 2025, in Tbilisi, Anna Bagrationi-Gruzinski was officially recognized as Head of the Royal House of Georgia. The event took place on St. Andrew's Day at the Tbilisi City Assembly. The conference was opened by Metropolitan Shio Mujiri and Metropolitan Daniel (Datuaashvili). With the consent and in the presence of Georgia's spiritual and academic elite, Metropolitan Anania (Japaridze) confirmed Decree No. 2 (2009) issued by Crown Prince Nugzar Bagrationi. This recognition marks strong support for Anna's position from both the Church and the scholarly community.

== Honours and awards ==
=== Honours ===
==== Dynastic honours ====
- (Georgia (country)) House of Bagrationi:
  - Grand Master Knight Grand Cross with Chain of the Royal Order of the Crown
  - Knight Grand Collar of the Order of the Eagle of Georgia and the Seamless Tunic of Our Lord Jesus Christ

==== Foreign honour ====
- (Kingdom of Rwanda) Rwandan Royal Family: Knight Grand Cross of the Royal Order of the Crown

=== Award ===
- Sweden: Grand Commander of the Grand Order of the Amaranth

Ana Bagration-Gruzinsky House of Gruzinsky Born: 1 November 1976
Titles in pretence
Preceded by Nugzar Bagration-Gruzinsky	— TITULAR — Pretender of the throne of Georgia disputed with David; 2025–	Incumbent; Heir: Giorgi Bagrationi
