= Giorgi Bagrationi (born 2011) =

Georgian prince

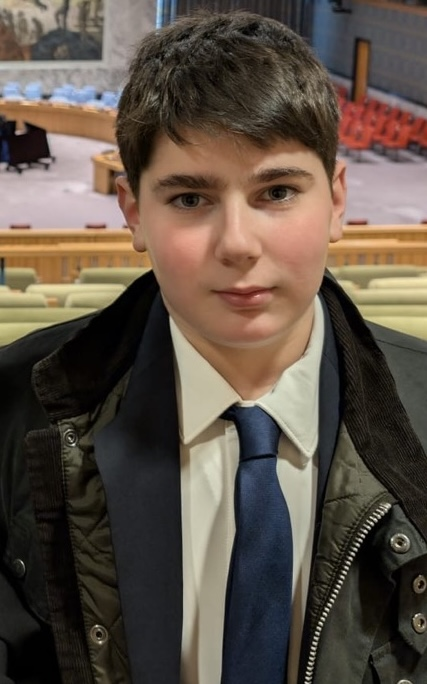
- Giorgi at the UN, 2025
- Born: 27 September 2011 (age 15); Madrid, Spain
- Dynasty: Bagrationi
- Father: David Bagration of Mukhrani
- Mother: Ana Bagration-Gruzinsky
- Religion: Georgian Orthodox Church

Giorgi Bagrationi (Georgian: გიორგი ბაგრატიონი; born 27 September 2011) is a Georgian prince of the Bagrationi dynasty.

== Family ==
Born in Spain, Giorgi is the only child of Prince David Bagration of Mukhrani and Princess Anna Bagration-Gruzinsky, married in February 2009. With his birth he became the potential heir to the rival claims of the Mukhraneli and Gruzinsky branches of the House of Bagration to the former throne of the Kingdom of Georgia on the condition no other Bagrationi prince was born in the Gruzinsky branch to displace his mother. Since the divorce of Giorgi's parents, he has been pictured in attendance at several civic and religious events with his father. On 2 April 2016, accompanying Prince David, Giorgi visited and was photographed in Tbilisi with the Catholicos-Patriarch of All Georgia Ilia II, who had christened him.

== Succession dispute ==
Before his death in 2025, his maternal grandfather Prince Nugzar Bagration-Gruzinsky refused to officially recognize his grandson as the heir to the Georgian throne or to the Gruzinsky branch (however, without calling into question his daughter’s dynastic rights, nor her capacity to recognize the dynastic rights of her own son when she assumes the succession). Nugzar had demanded that David sign a written agreement recognizing Nugzar and the Gruzinsky branch as the sole rightful heirs to the Georgian throne and to the legacy of the Georgian kings.

Following Nugzar's death on 1 March 2025, his mother is presumed to have become the Gruzinsky Pretender Queen of Georgia and therefore it is now almost assured that Giorgi will unite the rival claims, since he has now become the heir apparent to both the genealogical heir male of the Bagrationi dynasty as well as the heir general of Georgia's last monarch, King George XII.

== Christening ==
Giorgi's christening was held on 3 November 2013 by Patriarch Ilia II, primate of the Georgian Orthodox Church, in Svetitskhoveli Cathedral in Mtskheta. His godfathers are the patriarch himself, his uncles Irakli and Ugo, Levan Vasadze, said to be closely associated with ex-Prime Minister Bidzina Ivanishvili and the President Giorgi Margvelashvili, and Mikheil Akhvlediani, the honorary consul of Spain. Government minister Irakli Alasania was also present during the ceremony.

Patriarch Ilia II of Georgia said "Such royal christening has not been since 1801"

Prince Nugzar Bagration-Gruzinsky after the christening of his grandson said:

Batonishvili Giorgi is the direct descendant of the last king of united Georgia, George VIII and the last king of Kartli-Kakheti George XII through his mother's side.

== Honours ==
- Grand Collar of the Order of the Eagle of Georgia and the Seamless Tunic of Our Lord Jesus Christ (at birth).
- Honorary Inspector of the Spanish police.

== See also ==
- Georgian monarchs family tree of Bagrationi dynasty

Giorgi Bagrationi (born 2011) House of Mukhrani Born: 27 September 2011
Titles in pretence
Preceded by David Bagration of Mukhrani the current Mukhrani pretender	— TITULAR — Line of succession to the Georgian throne	Succeeded by Gourami Ugo Bagration
Preceded by Ana Bagration-Gruzinsky the current Gruzinsky pretender	— TITULAR — Line of succession to the Georgian throne	Succeeded by Irina Bagration-Gruzinsky
