= Kipiani =

Coat of Arms of the Princes Kipani

The House of Kipiani (Georgian: ყიფიანი) is an old Georgian noble family, formerly a princely one (tavadi). "Kipi"(Georgian: ყიფი) means proud in Georgian language.

== History ==
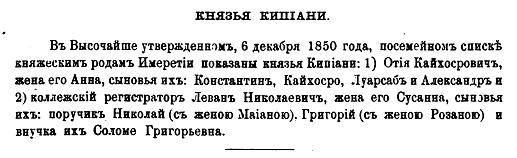
Genealogy of the Princes Kipiani in the Russian Empire (1892)

After the Russian annexation of the Kingdom of Georgia in 1801, Kipiani family became incorporated into the Russian nobility.

On 6 December 1850 they were granted the hereditary title of Knyaz in the Russian Empire by Nicholas I, Emperor of Russia. After receiving the title, the family became one of the Russian princely families.

== Notable members ==
- Prince Dimitri Kipiani (1814–1887), Georgian publicist, writer, translator, leader of liberal nobility

== Other people with the same surname ==
- David Kipiani (1951–2001), Soviet and Georgian footballer and coach
- Georgi Kipiani (born 1978), Georgian footballer and coach
- Nikolai Kipiani (born 1997), Russian footballer
- Tornike Kipiani (born 1987), Georgian singer
- Vakhtang Kipiani (born 1971), Ukrainian opinion journalist and historian

Fictional people

- Nino Kipiani, early 20th century protagonist of the German novel Ali and Nino
