= Gruzinsky =

Georgian royal house

Bagration-Gruzinsky (Bagrationi-Gruzinski)
- Parent house: Bagrationi dynasty
- Country: Georgia
- Current head: Ana Bagration-Gruzinsky
- Final ruler: George XII
- Deposition: 1801

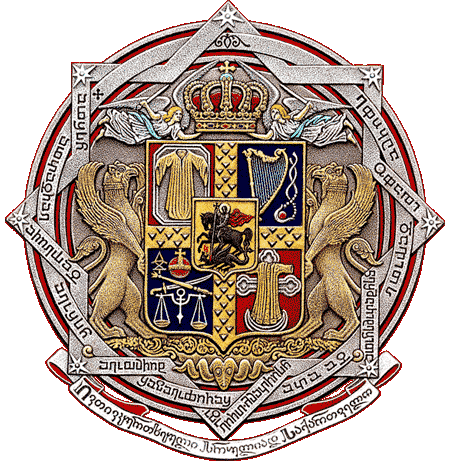
Insignia that is currently used by the family.

Gruzinsky (Russian: Грузинский; Georgian: გრუზინსკი) was a title and later the name of two different princely lines of the Bagrationi dynasty of Georgia, both of which received it as subjects of the Russian Empire. The name "Gruzinsky" (also spelled Gruzinski or Gruzinskii) derives from the Russian language, originally and literally meaning "of Georgia". Of the two lines, the younger one is the only line that still exists.

== Elder line ==
The "Elder House" of Princes Gruzinsky was an offshoot of the House of Mukhrani. Vakhtang V became the first King of Kartli from the Mukhrani line in 1658 but it was dispossessed of the throne of Kartli in 1727. The descendents of this offshoot from Bakar of Kartli (1700–1750) survived in Russia after he moved there in 1724 following his brief rule in Kartli. In Russia his royal family received the title of Gruzinsky but became extinct with deaths of Prince Pyotr (1837–1892) and Prince Ivane (1831–1898). The family had estates in the governorates of Moscow and Nizhegorod, and it was confirmed among the princely nobility of Russia in 1833.

== Younger line ==
The "Younger House" of Princes Gruzinsky (Bagrationi-Gruzinski) is an offshoot of the House of Kakheti (after 1462) and of Kartli (after 1744). The title of Prince(ss) Gruzinsky (Serene Prince[ss] after 1865) was conferred upon the grandchildren of the penultimate king of unified Kartli-Kakheti, Heraclius II (1720–1798), after the Russian annexation of Georgia in 1801. Descendants of Prince Bagrat (1776–1841), grandson of Heraclius II and son of the last king of Georgia, George XII (1746–1800), still survive in Georgia.

The most recent head of this family, Nugzar Bagration-Gruzinsky (1950-2025), claimed the legitimate headship of the Royal House of Georgia (also claimed by the genealogically senior surviving line of Bagrations of Mukhrani) based on male primogeniture descent from the last king of Kartli-Kakheti in eastern Georgia. As Nugzar had no male issue, Yevgeny Petrovich Gruzinsky (1947–17 July 2018), the great-great grandson of Bagrat's younger brother Ilia (1791–1854), who lived in the Russian Federation, was considered to be Nugzar's heir presumptive within the primogeniture principle. Yevgeny died without issue. Nugzar himself argued in favor of having his elder daughter, Ana, designated as his heir in accordance with the Georgian dynastic law of "Zedsidzeoba" according to which every child of Princess Ana would inherit eligibility for dynastic succession through their mother, thus continuing the elder line of George XII.
