= Leonida Bagration of Mukhrani =

Princess Leonida Bagration
- Grand Duchess Leonida Georgievna of Russia
- Photo portrait of Grand Duchess Leonida of Russia
- Born: Princess Leonida Georgievna Bagration-Mukhrani; 6 October 1914; Tiflis, Caucasus Viceroyalty, Russian Empire (now Georgia)
- Died: 23 May 2010 (aged 95); Madrid, Spain
- Burial: 2 June 2010; Grand Ducal Mausoleum, St. Petersburg
- Spouse: Sumner Moore Kirby (m. 1934; div. 1937) Grand Duke Vladimir Kirillovich of Russia (m. 1948; died 1992)
- Issue: Helen Louise Kirby, Countess Dvinskaya; Grand Duchess Maria Vladimirovna of Russia
- House: Bagration-Mukhrani
- Father: Prince George Bagration of Mukhrani
- Mother: Helena Złotnicka h. Nowina

Grand Duchess Leonida Georgievna of Russia (Russian: Леонида Георгиевна Романова; née Princess Leonida Georgievna Bagration of Mukhrani (Georgian: ლეონიდა გიორგის ასული ბაგრატიონი-მუხრანელი); 6 October [O.S. 23 September] 1914 – 23 May 2010) was the consort of Vladimir Kirillovich, Grand Duke of Russia.

== Early life ==
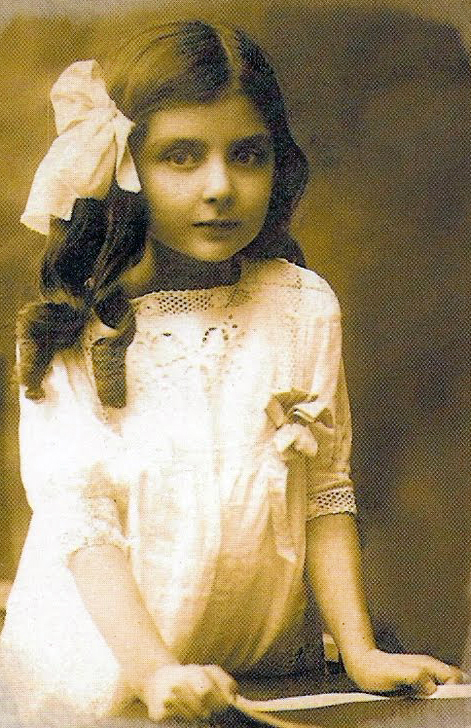
Princess Leonida Bagration

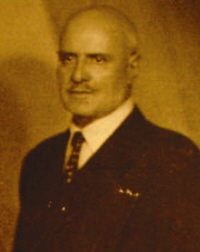
Father of Leonida: Prince George Bagration of Mukhrani

Born on 6 October 1914, in Tiflis, Georgia, Russian Empire as Princess Leonida Bagration of Mukhrani, she was a daughter of Prince George Bagration of Mukhrani and his Polish wife Helena Sigismundovna, née Nowina Złotnicka (1886–1979). She descended patrilineally from former Kings of Georgia. Her mother's family belonged to an ancient untitled Polish nobility, although one of Leonida's two lines of descent from Georgia's penultimate king Erekle II (Heraclius II) is through her mother, a descendant of the king's daughter, Princess Anastasia, who married an Eristavi prince. The other ancestral line derives through the marriage of another of the king's daughters, Princess Tamara, to Ioane Bagrationi, 18th Prince of Mukhrani.

The Bagration family's genealogy traces back at least to the medieval era in its male line and hundreds of years further back as rulers in the female line. Leonida's grandfather, Prince Alexander Bagration of Mukhrani, was born in 1853 in Georgia's historical capital Tbilisi, then part of the Russian Empire, and was killed by Bolsheviks at Pyatigorsk in 1918 during the Russian revolution. Fearing for their lives, the family took refuge in Constantinople, then spent eight months in Germany before returning to Tbilisi, now capital of the Georgian Soviet Socialist Republic, to re-claim a portion of property which, as émigrés they risked losing to total confiscation. Although the family made repairs to their home and Leonida would recall her grandfather's insistence that they continue to dine formally on silver plate to retain their sense of propriety, they were eventually deprived of all but two rooms of their old palace and subjected to harassment. Thanks to the intervention of Maxim Gorky, who had enjoyed the patronage of the Bagrations, in 1931 they once again fled the Soviet Union, going into exile in Spain. The family moved to France, where Leonida's grandmother and relations had already settled.

== First marriage ==
In France, Princess Leonida met Sumner Moore Kirby (1895–1945), a wealthy "Pennsylvanian Protestant". They were married in Nice, France, on 6 November 1934. Sumner Moore Kirby was born in Wilkes Barre, Pennsylvania, the youngest of the two sons of Fred Morgan Kirby, a millionaire and business partner of one of the F. W. Woolworth Company heirs (Charles Sumner Woolworth) and wife Jessie Amelie Owen. Leonida was his third wife; he had been married from 1925 to 1931 to Doris Landy Wayland, with whom he had a daughter, Gloria Price Kirby (1928-2017). Kirby's second marriage, to Valentine Wagner, lasted from 20 January 1932 to 19 July 1934. Valentine Wagner's mother was Princess Elisabeth Bagration, a member of the same family as Princess Leonida. Kirby had no children from this second marriage. Leonida and Kirby had one daughter, Helen Louise Kirby, born in Geneva, Switzerland, on 26 January 1935. Leonida and Sumner Kirby divorced after three years on 18 November 1937. Leonida's first husband died on 7 April 1945 in a hospital at Leau, near the Buchenwald Concentration Camp, to which he had been deported from France after being arrested along with other U.S. and British civilians by the Vichy France in 1944.

As war intensified, Leonida and her daughter relocated to officially neutral Spain. In 1944, Leonida's brother, Prince Irakli, also moved to Spain.

== Second marriage ==
According to her published memoirs, Leonida first met Vladimir Kirillovich at a restaurant in France during World War II. But they did not see each other again for a few years, when both were making extended visits to Sanlúcar de Barrameda, Spain, where their hosts happened to be neighbors. Vladimir was staying with his aunt, the Princess Beatrice, Duchess of Galliera, a first cousin of both the murdered Emperor Nicholas II and Empress Alexandra Feodorovna.

On 13 August 1948 (civilly on 12 August 1948) at the Orthodox Church of St. Gerasimus, Lausanne, Switzerland, Princess Leonida wed for the second time, marrying religiously The Grand Duke, who used the pre-revolutionary Russian title Grand Duke, the style Imperial Highness and claimed to be, from 1938 to his death, Head of the Russian Imperial House by virtue of being hereditary heir by primogeniture to the throne of the Romanovs according to the Fundamental Laws of the Russian Empire, as codified in 1906 and in force until overturned by the Bolshevik Revolution of 1917.

As his consort she used the title Grand Duchess Leonida Georgievna. By him, she had another daughter, Maria Vladimirovna, who claims to have succeeded her father upon his death in 1992.

In 1946, Leonida's brother, Prince Irakly, married King Alfonso XIII of Spain's maternal niece, Princess Doña María de las Mercedes de Baviera y Borbon (1911–1953), obtaining Vladimir's recommendation that the Spanish pretender, Don Juan, Count of Barcelona, would accept the marriage as dynastic, which he did not. The Count of Barcelona, then Head of the Royal House of Spain, considered the issue of this marriage to be disqualified from the Spanish succession. The only son of this marriage was sponsored at his baptism by the Count of Barcelona but the latter's refusal to recognize his god-son as a Spanish dynast led to the Bagrations' alienation from the Spanish Royal Family according to Guy Stair Sainty. In 1948 Vladimir, relying on his own earlier advice on the Bagrations' historically royal status, chose to wed Leonida dynastically in Lausanne, Switzerland.

== Controversy ==
The Grand Duke's marriage to Leonida Bagration remained controversial; some considered it to be morganatic. Although the princess descended from the Bagrationi dynasty which had ruled as kings of Georgia since the early Middle Ages, it had been deposed and reduced to the status of Russian nobility for more than a century prior to the Russian Revolution in 1917. Leonida belonged to the senior surviving branch of that family, but the last Georgian king from whom she descended in the male line was Constantine II who died in 1505, although other branches of the family continued to reign in the Caucasus as late as 1810. Besides, according to the Almanach de Gotha, as per the decision of Emperor Nicholas II made in 1911, the Princess Tatiana Constantinovna of Russia had morganatically wed Prince Konstantin Alexandrovich Bagration-Mukhransky, a member of the same branch of the House of Bagration into which Princess Leonida would later be born. Because the Russian Empire did not accord royal rank to the Bagrations at the time of the Russian Revolution, some Romanov dynasts in exile maintained that Leonida's daughter, Maria Vladimirovna, could not succeed to her father's claim to the Russian throne.

== Claimant's consort ==
Leonida accompanied her husband when he made his only visit to Russia in November 1991, following the implosion of the Soviet Union. She was also at Vladimir's side the following year when he collapsed and died following delivery of a speech in Florida.

She visited her own ancestral land with her nephew Prince George Bagration of Mukhrani in 1995 when he first visited Georgia as a royal pretender to that country's abolished monarchy. But she did not attend the much-publicized 2009 wedding of her grand-nephew, Prince David Bagration of Mukhrani to Princess Ana Bagration-Gruzinsky, the heiress of King George XII of Georgia, celebrated at the restored Holy Trinity Cathedral of Tbilisi.

Wealth inherited by her elder, unmarried daughter Helen Kirby (styled by Vladimir's declaration as "Countess Dvinskaya"), helped Leonida, her second husband and younger daughter maintain homes in the north of France and in Madrid. There, both Maria Vladimirovna and her only son, Grand Duke George Mikhailovich, were raised.

== Death ==
Leonida Georgievna died on 23 May 2010. She requested to be buried next to her husband Vladimir Kirillovich in the Grand Ducal Mausoleum, Saint Petersburg. She was the last member of the Romanov family born on the territory of the Russian Empire during the monarchy.

== Honours ==
=== Dynastic ===
- House of Romanov Knight Grand Cordon with Collar of the Imperial Order of Saint Andrew
- House of Romanov Former Grand Mistress Dame Grand Cordon of the Imperial Order of Saint Catherine
- House of Romanov Knight Grand Cordon of the Order of Saint Nicholas the Wonderworker
- House of Romanov: Former Grand Mistress Dame of the Order of Saint Olga, 1st Class

==== Foreign honours ====
- Georgia: Dame Grand Collar of the Order of the Eagle of Georgia (House of Bagration)
- Italy:
  - Sovereign Military Order of Malta: Dame Grand Cross of the Order of Merit
  - (Kingdom of the Two Sicilies) Two Sicilian Royal Family: Dame Grand Cross of Merit of the Two Sicilian Royal Sacred Military Constantinian Order of Saint George

== Ancestors ==
Ancestors of Grand Duchess Leonida Georgievna of Russia

8. Prince Iraklij Konstantinovich Bagrationi of Mukhrani
4. Prince Alexander Bagration of Mukhrani
9. Princess Katharina Ivanovna Argutinsky-Dolgorukov
2. George, Prince Bagration of Mukhrani
10. Dmitri Zakharovitch Golovachev
5. Maria Dmitrievna Golovacheva
11. Leonida Igorevna von Hessen
1. Leonida Georgievna, Grand Duchess of Russia
12. Dymitr Złotnicki h. Nowina
6. Zygmund Czesław Złotnicki h. Nowina
13. Celestyna Trzeciak h. Sas
3. Helena Złotnicka h. Nowina
14. Prince Elisabar Eristavi of Ksani
7. Princess Maria Elisabarowna Eristavi of Ksani
15. Princess Kethevan Eristavi of Ksani

== See also ==
- Georgian monarchs family tree of Bagrationi dynasty of Kartli, the line of Leonida Bagration of Mukhrani's descent

Leonida Bagration of Mukhrani House of Mukhrani Born: 23 September 1914 Died: 23 May 2010
Titles in pretence
Vacant Title last held by Princess Victoria Melita of Saxe-Coburg and Gotha	— TITULAR — Empress consort of Russia; 13 August 1948 – 21 April 1992; Reason for succession failure: Empire abolished in 1917	Succeeded by disputed
