= George Bagration of Mukhrani =

Georgian nobleman

Prince George Bagration
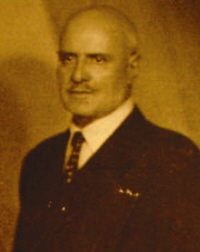
- Born: 16 July 1884; Saint Petersburg, Russia
- Died: 29 September 1957 (aged 73); Madrid, Spain
- Burial: Svetitskhoveli Cathedral
- Spouse: Helena Złotnicka h. Nowina (m. 1908)
- Issue: Prince Irakli Bagration of Mukhrani; Princess Maria Bagration of Mukhrani; Princess Leonida, Grand Duchess of Russia
- Father: Prince Alexander Bagration of Mukhrani
- Mother: Maria Golovatcheva

George Bagration of Mukhrani, Giorgi Bagration-Mukhraneli (Georgian: გიორგი ბაგრატიონ-მუხრანელი) or Prince Georgi Alexandrovich Bagration-Mukhranski (28 July [O.S. 16 July] 1884 – 29 September 1957) was a Georgian nobleman, and a titular head of the House of Mukhrani, a collateral branch of the former royal dynasty of Bagrationi.

== Biography ==
George was born in Saint Petersburg, Russia, the son of Prince Alexander Bagration of Mukhrani and Princess Maria Bagration of Mukhrani, née Golovatcheva. He was educated at the Page Corps. He married, in July 1908, half Georgian and half Polish aristocrat Helena Sigismundovna Złotnicka-Nowina [or Złotnicka herbu Nowina] (Tiflis, 10 April [O.S. 29 March] 1886 – Madrid, 25 April 1979), daughter of Zygmunt-Czeslaw Dimitrievich Złotnicki h. Nowina (2 June 1849 – ?, aka Count Złotnicki-Nowina and descendant of Mikołaj Złotnicki) and wife Princess Mariam Elisabarovna Eristova of Ksani (1858–1934, a remote descendant of the 18th-century Georgian king Erekle II), daughter of Prince Elisabar Georgievich Eristov of Ksani (son of Prince Shanshe Ieseevich Eristov-Ksansky and wife Princess Elena Ivanovna Orbeliani) and wife Princess Kethevan Shalvaevna Eristova of Ksani (daughter of Prince Shalva Revazovich Eristov-Ksansky [grandson of King Erekle II of Georgia] and wife Princess Ekaterina Aslanovna Orbeliani).

George Bagration served as a marshal of the Council of Nobility of Dusheti in Georgia from 1916 to 1917. After the Russian Revolution of 1917, he hailed independent Georgia and fought against the Bolsheviks during the Russian Civil War. George chose to stay in Georgia rather than follow his wife and children in exile following the Sovietization of the country in 1921. He was, nevertheless, arrested by the Soviet authorities in 1930, but was soon released through the efforts of the Russian writer Maxim Gorky. George Bagration left the Soviet Union and joined his family in their European exile. He finally settled in Spain in 1944. His son, Irakli, was energetically involved in Georgian political émigré activities. One of his daughters, the second one, Leonida, married Vladimir Cyrillovich Romanov, Pretender to the Russian throne; the other, Maria, homesick, returned to Soviet Georgia, but was arrested in 1948 and had to spend eight years in exile in Magadan. She died in Tbilisi in 1992.

George Bagration of Mukhrani died at Madrid, Spain, in 1957. His remains were brought back to Georgia by his grandson Jorge de Bagration in 1995 and interred at the Cathedral of Living Pillar at Mtskheta.

== Ancestors ==
Ancestors of George, Prince Bagration of Mukhrani

16. Ioane, Prince of Mukhrani
8. Constantine IV, Prince of Mukhrani
17. Princess Ketevan of Georgia
4. Prince Irakli Konstantinovich Bagration of Mukhrani
18. Prince Zaal Guramishvili
9. Princess Khorasan-Maria Guramishvili
2. Prince Alexander Bagration of Mukhrani
20. Prince Zakhary Argutinsky-Dolgoruky
10. Prince Ivan Zakharovich Argutinsky-Dolgoruky
5. Princess Ekaterina Ivanovna Argutinskaya-Dolgorukova
22. Prince Sulkhan Tumanishvili
11. Princess Nino Sulkhanovna Tumanova
23. Maria Karakhanovna
1. George, Prince Bagration of Mukhrani
24. Aleksei Ivanovich Golovachev
12. Zakhar Alekseevich Golovachev
25. Praskovya Vasilievna
6. Vice-Admiral Dmitry Zakharovich Golovachev
13. Varvara Alexandrovna Ivina
3. Maria Dmitrievna Golovacheva
28. Friedrich Leonhard (Fedor) von Hessen
14. Georg (Egor Fedorovich) von Hessen
7. Leonida Augusta Georgievna von Hessen
30. Reinhold Peter (Roman Petrovich) Scheltinga
15. Elisabeth Reinholdine Scheltinga

Georgian royalty
Preceded by Alexander Bagration of Mukhrani (father)	Head of the House of Mukhrani; 1918—1957	Succeeded by Irakli Bagration of Mukhrani (son)
