= Irakli Bagration of Mukhrani =

Georgian prince

Prince Irakli Bagrationi ირაკლი ბაგრატიონ მუხრანელი
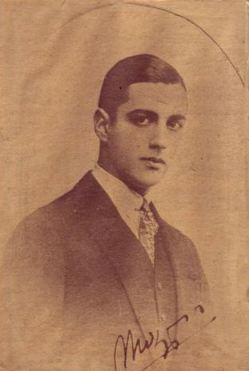
- Prince Irakli Bagration, 1926
- Born: 21 March 1909; Tbilisi, Georgia, Russian Empire
- Died: 30 October 1977 (aged 68); Madrid, Spain
- Burial: Svetitskhoveli Cathedral
- Spouse: Maria Belaiev (m. 19??; div. 19??) Maria Antonietta Pasquini dei Conti di Costafiorita (m. 1940; died 1944) Infanta Doña María de las Mercedes Raimunda de Baviera y Borbón (m. 1946; died 1953) María del Pilar Pascual y Roig, Marquesa de Carsani (m. 1961)
- Issue: Jorge de Bagration; Mariam de Bagration; Bagrat de Bagration
- House: Bagration-Mukhrani
- Father: Prince George Bagration of Mukhrani
- Mother: Helena Złotnicka h. Nowina
- Religion: Georgian Orthodox

Irakli Bagration-Mukhraneli (Georgian: ირაკლი ბაგრატიონ-მუხრანელი; 21 March 1909 – 30 October 1977) was a Georgian prince of the Mukhrani branch of the former royal dynasty of Bagrationi.

== Early life ==
He was born in Tbilisi, Georgia (then part of Imperial Russia), to Prince George Bagration of Mukhrani (1884–1957) and his wife Helena Sigismundovna, née Nowina Złotnicka. The 1921 Red Army invasion of Georgia forced the family to leave Georgia. Educated in Germany, Prince Irakli then settled in Italy in the 1930s.

== Personal life ==
He first married, then divorced Maria Belaiev. He married secondly Donna Maria Antonietta née Pasquini dei Conti di Costafiorita (1911-1944) in 1940. Following her death in childbirth in 1944, Irakli, with his infant son Giorgi, moved to Spain, where he naturalized and married (third) Infanta Doña María de las Mercedes Raimunda de Baviera y Borbón (1911–1953), a niece of Alfonso XIII of Spain, in 1946 at the Castle of San Sebastian, Spain. She died in 1953, leaving the daughter Mariam (born 1947) and son Bagrat (1949-2017) behind, and Prince Irakli married (fourth) Doña María del Pilar Pascual y Roig (d. 1994), Marquesa de Carsani, in 1961.

== Career ==
Irakli Bagration-Mukhraneli played a prominent role in Georgian political emigration circles and, as an active royalist, remained in opposition to Soviet rule in Georgia. He restored the Order of the Eagle of Georgia and the Seamless Tunic of Our Lord Jesus Christ in 1939. In April 1942 the German diplomat Friedrich-Werner von der Schulenberg attempted to unite Caucasus émigré leaders from the Northern Caucasus, Azerbaijan, Armenia, and Georgia - including Irakli Bagration - at the "Adlon meeting" in Berlin; however, the émigrés failed to obtain the endorsement of Reichsleiter Alfred Rosenberg's Ostministerium for recognition of independence in return for collaboration with the Axis powers. Irakli Bagration sponsored the establishment in the Northern-hemisphere autumn of 1942 of the Germany-based Union of Georgian Traditionalists, which fought to restore Georgia's sovereignty from the USSR and advocated a constitutional monarchy as a form of the government for an independent Georgia. In 1942 Georgian exiles in Rome recognised him as a pretender to the Georgian throne.

Following his father's death in 1957, Prince Irakli succeeded as Head of the Princely House of Mukhrani and declared himself Head of the Royal House of Georgia, assuming the style of "His Royal Highness". He died at Madrid in 1977. His remains lay in the British Cemetery of Madrid until transferred to the Svetitskhoveli Cathedral in Mtskheta in 1995.

== Patronages ==
- Member of the Union of the Nobility of Majorca.
- Member of the Majorca Academy for Genealogical Studies.

== Honours ==
- Founder and Grand Master of the Order of Queen Tamara.
- Founder and Grand Master of the Order of the Eagle of Georgia.
- Grand Provincial of the Order of Queen Ketevan.
- Knight of the Order of St. Andrew the First Called.
- Knight of the Order of Alexander Nevsky.
- Knight of the Order of the White Eagle.
- Knight 1st class of the Order of St. Stanislaus.
- Knight 1st class of the Order of St. Anna.
- Knight Grand Cross of the Order of St. Sava.
- Knight Grand Cross of the Order of Vasco Núñez de Balboa.
- Knight Grand Cross of the Order of the White Eagle.
- Knight Grand Cross with Collar of the Order of St. Lazarus of Jerusalem.

== Ancestors ==
Ancestors of Prince Irakli Bagration of Mukhrani

16. Constantine IV, Prince of Mukhrani
8. Prince Irakli Konstantinovich Bagration of Mukhrani
17. Princess Khorasan-Maria Guramishvili
4. Prince Alexander Bagration of Mukhrani
18. Prince Ivan Zakharovich Argutinsky-Dolgoruky
9. Princess Ekaterina Ivanovna Argutinskaya-Dolgorukova
19. Princess Nino Sulkhanovna Tumanova
2. George, Prince Bagration of Mukhrani
20. Zakhar Alekseevich Golovachev
10. Vice-Admiral Dmitry Zakharovich Golovachev
21. Varvara Alexandrovna Ivina
5. Maria Dmitrievna Golovacheva
22. Georg (Egor) von Hessen
11. Leonida Augusta Georgievna von Hessen
23. Elisabeth Reinholdine Scheltinga
1. Prince Irakli Bagration of Mukhrani
24. Antoni Polikarp Złotnicki
12. Dymitr Złotnicki
25. Elizaveta Dmitrievna Norova
6. Zygmunt Czesław Złotnicki
26. Celestyn Melchiorovich Trzeciak
13. Celestyna Trzeciak
27. Elżbieta Bejnarowicz
3. Helena Złotnicka
28. Prince Shanshe (Pavel) Iesseevich Eristavi of Ksani
14. Prince Elizbar Eristavi of Ksani
29. Princess Elena Ivanovna Orbeliani
7. Princess Maria Elizbarovna Eristavi of Ksani
30. Prince Shalva Revazovich Eristavi of Ksani
15. Princess Ketevan Eristavi of Ksani
31. Princess Ekaterina Aslanovna Orbeliani

Irakli Bagration of Mukhrani House of Mukhrani Cadet branch of the Bagrationi dynasty Born: 21 March 1909 Died: 30 October 1977
Georgian royalty
Preceded by George Bagration of Mukhrani (father)	Head of the House of Mukhrani; 1957-1977	Succeeded by Giorgi Bagration-Mukhraneli
Vacant Title last held by Alexander Bagration	Head of the House of Bagrationi; 1957-1977	Succeeded by Giorgi Bagration-Mukhraneli
