= Alexander Bagration of Mukhrani =

Alexander
- Prince of Mukhrani
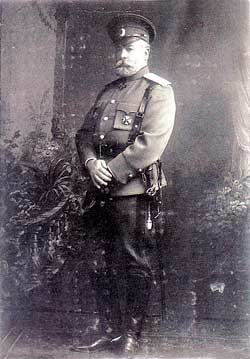

Head of the Princely House of Mukhrani
- Predecessor: Prince Constantine
- Successor: Prince George
- Born: 20 July [O.S. 02 July] 1853; Mchadijvari, Tiflis, Georgia, Russia
- Died: 30 October 1918 (aged 65); Pyatigorsk, Russian Soviet Federative Socialist Republic
- Spouse: Maria Golovatcheva (m. 1881)
- Issue: George, Prince of Mukhrani; Princess Nina; Prince Kyrion; Princess Maria
- House: Bagrationi-Mukhrani
- Father: Prince Irakli Bagration of Mukhrani
- Mother: Princess Ketevan Argutinsky-Dolgorukov
- Religion: Georgian Orthodox
- Military career
- Allegiance: (Russian Empire) Empire of Russia
- Branch: Imperial Russian Army
- Service years: 1874-1918
- Unit: Life Guard Horse Regiment
- Commands: Nizhny Novgorod dragoon regiment.
- Battles: Russo-Turkish War

Prince Alexander Bagration, Prince of Mukhrani (Georgian: ალექსანდრე ბაგრატიონ-მუხრანელი, romanized: aleksandre bagrat'ion-mukhraneli, Alek’sandre Bagration-Mukhraneli; Russian: Александр Ираклиевич Багратион-Мухранский, Aleksandré Iraklyevich Bagration-Mukhransky; 1 August [O.S. 20 July] 1853 – 12 November [O.S. 30 October] 1918) was a Georgian nobleman, and head of the princely House of Mukhrani, a collateral branch of the former royal dynasty of Bagrationi and a descendant of Erekle II, the penultimate monarch of the Kingdom of Kartli-Kakheti. A general in the Imperial Russian service and member of the tsar Nicholas II’s immediate circle, he was killed by the Bolsheviks in the post-revolution turmoil in Russia.

== Biography ==
Alexander was born to Prince Irakli Bagration of Mukhrani and Princess Ketevan née Argutinsky-Dolgorukov in the village of Mchadijvari, Georgia, then part of the Russian Empire. Educated at Nikolaevsky Cavalry School, he entered the Russian military service in 1874 and took part in the Russo-Turkish War (1877-1878). He was promoted to colonel in 1893 and served in the Caucasus military district until 1902, when he was appointed commander of the Nizhny Novgorod dragoon regiment.

In 1903, Prince Alexander succeeded on the death of his cousin Konstantin as Head of the Princely House of Mukhrani. Next year, he was made major-general and placed in command of the Leib Guard cavalry regiment. In 1905, he was appointed major-general à la suite to Tsar Nicholas II. He was a member of the State Duma of the Russian Empire and promoted to lieutenant-general in 1917. After the Bolshevik seizure of power, he attempted to make his way to his native Georgia, but was captured by the Red Guards in the North Caucasus and perished during a mass killing of Imperial army officers in Pyatigorsk in October 1918.

Alexander was survived by his noble wife, whom he married in Tiflis on 6 November [O.S. 25 October] 1881 Maria Dimitrievna Golovacheva (Tiflis, 23 October [O.S. 11 October] 1855 – Nice, 25 June [O.S. 12 June] 1932), daughter of Vice Admiral Dmitry Zakharovich Golovachev (13 January 1822 - 4 November 1886) and wife Leonida Egorovna von Hessen, paternal granddaughter of Zakhar Alexeievich Golovachev and wife Varvara Alexandrovna Ivina and maternal granddaughter of Egor (George) von Hessen and wife Elisaveta Reingoldovna van Scheltinga, who died as an émigré in France and by two of his children, Prince George and Princess Nina. He outlived two of his children – Prince Kyrion (died in infancy in 1898) and Princess Maria (1882–1893). His granddaughter Leonida, was wife of Grand Duke Vladimir Kirillovich of Russia.

Preceded by Constantine Bagration of Mukhrani	Head of the House of Mukhrani; 1903–1918	Succeeded by George Bagration of Mukhrani
