= Order of the Eagle of Georgia =

Order of the Eagle of Georgia and the Seamless Tunic of Our Lord Jesus Christ საქართველოს არწივისა და უფლისა ჩვენისა იესო ქრისტეს კვართის ორდენი
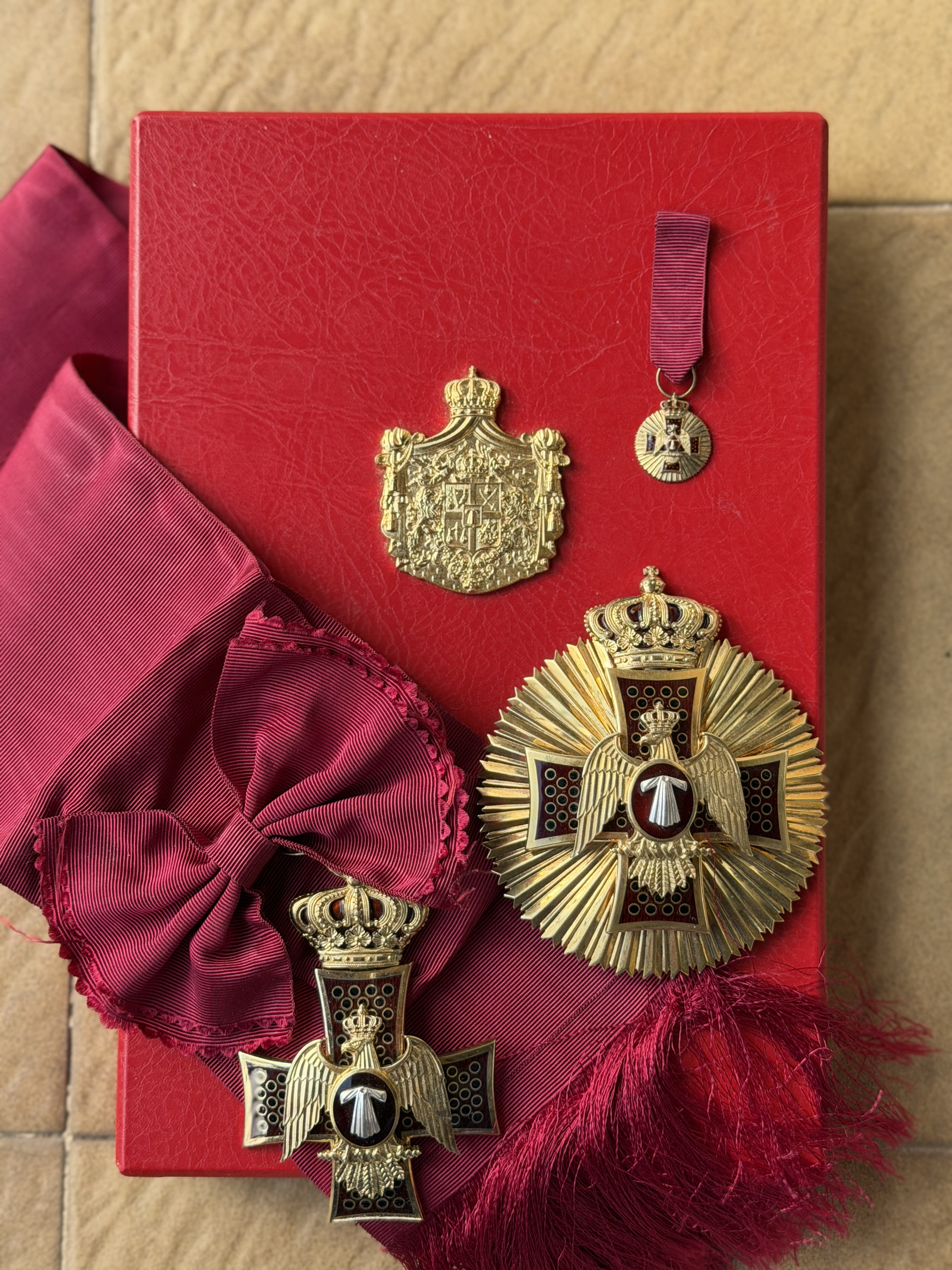
- Grand Cross insignia

Awarded by Prince David Bagration of Mukhrani
- Type: Dynastic order
- Established: 1939 (modern order)
- Royal house: House of Mukhrani
- Ribbon: Maroon
- Founder: Irakli Bagration of Mukhrani
- Grand Master: David Bagration of Mukhrani
- Website: Official website
- Ribbon bar

The Order of the Eagle of Georgia and the Seamless Tunic of Our Lord Jesus Christ, usually called the Order of the Eagle of Georgia, is a dynastic order of the Royal House of Bagrationi-Mukhrani, the senior male-line branch of the Bagrationi dynasty. Prince Irakli Bagration of Mukhrani founded the modern order in 1939. His grandson Prince David Bagration of Mukhrani has been Head of the Royal House and the Order's grand master since 2008.

== History ==
Irakli founded the order in 1939 while living in exile in Italy, where he led a group of Georgian political emigrants. In 1942 he established the Union of Georgian Traditionalists, which sought a constitutional monarchy in Georgia.

In his account in World Orders of Knighthood and Merit, Guy Stair Sainty describes a tradition in which the order originated as a collar awarded by Bagratid kings in the later Middle Ages and was reformed in the eighteenth century. He notes that there is little historical evidence for a medieval Georgian order organised on the western European model. The name also refers to the tunic of Jesus. According to Georgian religious tradition, the garment was brought from the Holy Land to Mtskheta after the Crucifixion and buried beneath what became Svetitskhoveli Cathedral.

Irakli's son Giorgi (Jorge) Bagrationi succeeded him as head of the order. Following Giorgi's death on 16 January 2008, the grand mastership passed to his son David.

On 13 July 2013, David conferred the order on the poet David Maghradze and the artist Nikusha Shengelaia at the Ateneo Mercantil in Valencia, Spain. On 8 March 2017, the Duke and Duchess of Gloucester received the Grand Collar from David on behalf of Elizabeth II.

World Orders of Knighthood and Merit includes the order among those founded by royal claimants in exile. The International Commission on Orders of Chivalry lists it as the "Tunic of Our Lord" in its 2024 register, under the category "Awards founded by the political claimant of a formerly reigning dynasty".

== Grand masters ==
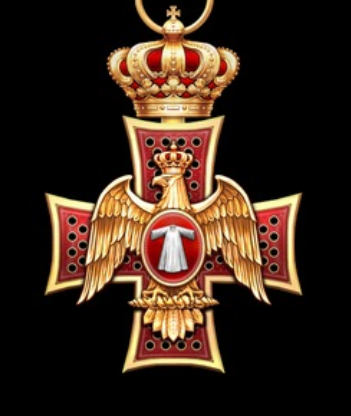
Badge of the order

The grand masters of the modern order have been:

- Irakli Bagration of Mukhrani (1939–1977)
- Giorgi (Jorge) Bagrationi (1977–2008)
- David Bagration of Mukhrani (2008–present)

== Grades and insignia ==
The badge is a red-enamelled cross pattée bearing a single-headed eagle, with a white tunic on a red oval at its centre. The collar alternates crosses, eagles, and tunics, and the ribbon is deep maroon.

The Royal House lists the following grades:

- Knight or Dame Grand Collar (KGCEG/DGCEG)
- Knight or Dame Grand Cross (GCEG)
- Knight or Dame Grand Officer (KGEG/DGEG)
- Knight or Dame Commander (KCEG/DCEG)
- Knight or Dame (KEG/DEG)
- Esquire
Insignia charts
Insignia worn by knights in each principal grade

Insignia worn by dames in each principal grade

Heraldic display of insignia for each principal grade

== Recipients ==
Recipients of the order include:

- Bartholomew I
- Duarte Pio, Duke of Braganza
- Elizabeth II
- Yukio Hatoyama
- Necla Sultan
- Nilüfer Hanımsultan

== See also ==
- Order of Queen Tamara
- Orders, decorations, and medals of Georgia

== Sources ==
- Montgomery-Massingberd, Hugh (1980). Burke's Royal Families of the World. Vol. II: Africa & the Middle East. Burke's Peerage. ISBN 0-85011-029-7.
- Martínez Larrañaga, Fernando; Escudero y Díaz Madroñero, Alfredo; de Montells y Galán, José María (2015). Armorial de la Orden del Águila de Georgia y la Túnica Inconsútil de Nuestro Señor Jesucristo. ISBN 978-84-943890-4-7.
- "Orden del Águila de Georgia y la Túnica sin Costuras de Nuestro Señor Jesucristo".
- "Elenco de caballeros y damas de la Orden del Águila de Georgia y la Túnica sin Costuras de Nuestro Señor Jesucristo" (PDF).
- Serrano, S. (2014). "The Georgian Church: Embodiment of National Unity or Opposition Force?". Russian Politics and Law. 52 (4): 74–92. doi:10.2753/RUP1061-1940520404. S2CID 142979772.
- Sainty, Guy Stair; Heydel-Mankoo, Rafal, eds. (2006). "Georgia". World Orders of Knighthood and Merit. Vol. 2. Burke's Peerage & Gentry. pp. 1847–1849. ISBN 978-0-9711966-7-4.
