= Simon, Prince of Mukhrani =

Georgian nobleman

Simon

Prince of Mukhrani
- Reign: 1756–1778
- Predecessor: Constantine II
- Successor: Ioane
- Born: 17 August 1726
- Died: 13 February 1785 (aged 58)
- Spouse: Tamar; Ana
- Issue: Katsia; Giorgi; Ermile; Dimitri; Salome
- House: Mukhrani
- Father: Levan, Prince of Mukhrani
- Mother: Helen
- Religion: Georgian Orthodox Church

Simon or Svimon Mukhranbatoni (Georgian: სიმონ [სვიმონ] მუხრანბატონი; 17 August 1726 – 13 February 1785) was a Georgian nobleman of the House of Mukhrani, a collateral branch of the royal Bagrationi dynasty of Kartli. He was Prince (batoni) of Mukhrani and ex officio commander of the Banner of Shida Kartli and Grand Master of the Household (msakhurt-ukhutsesi) at the court of Kartli from 1756 to 1778.

== Career ==
Simon was a son of Levan, Prince of Mukhrani, and a certain Helen. He acceded to the titles and possessions of his father in 1756, in the reign of King Teimuraz II, succeeding on the death of his relative, Constantine III, Prince of Mukhrani, whose heirs were in their minority. He was further appointed by Teimuraz as nasakhchibashi, "Lord High Executioner", the office which gave rise to his moniker, Svimon the nasakhchibashi (სვიმონ ნასახჩიბაში).

During the 1768–74 war between the Russian and Ottoman empires, in which the Georgians allied themselves with the Russians, Prince Simon contributed to the victory of Teimuraz II's son and successor, King Heraclius II of Georgia at Aspindza in April 1770. During the campaign, Heraclius was abandoned by his ally, the Russian general Totleben, and the Georgian forces had to confront a larger Turkish-Lezgin army. The night before the battle Prince Simon led some two dozen men and clandestinely dismantled the only bridge across the river, stranding the enemy forces on the riverbank and allowing Heraclius to win a decisive victory. In 1778, a change in political climate forced Prince Simon to abdicate in favor of his nephew, Ioane, and retire to Russia.

== Family ==
Simon was married twice, first to a certain Tamar and secondly to a certain Ana (1733–1823). His children were:

- Katsia (fl. 1826), who had two sons, Simon (born 1796) and Luarsab (born 1797). His male-line descendants survive in present-day Georgia;
- Giorgi (1765–1825), who had two daughters, Nina (fl. 1819) and Sophio (1809–1847);
- Ermile (Ermia; 1780–1862), who married Princess Ketevan Vachnadze and had six children;
- Dimitri (died 1828), who was married and had three children;
- Salome (fl. 1827).

Preceded by Constantine III	Prince of Mukhrani; 1756–1778	Succeeded by Ioane
