= Maria Pia de Saxe-Coburgo e Bragança =

Bastard daughter of King Carlos I of Portugal

Maria Pia of Saxe-Coburg and Braganza
- Pretender
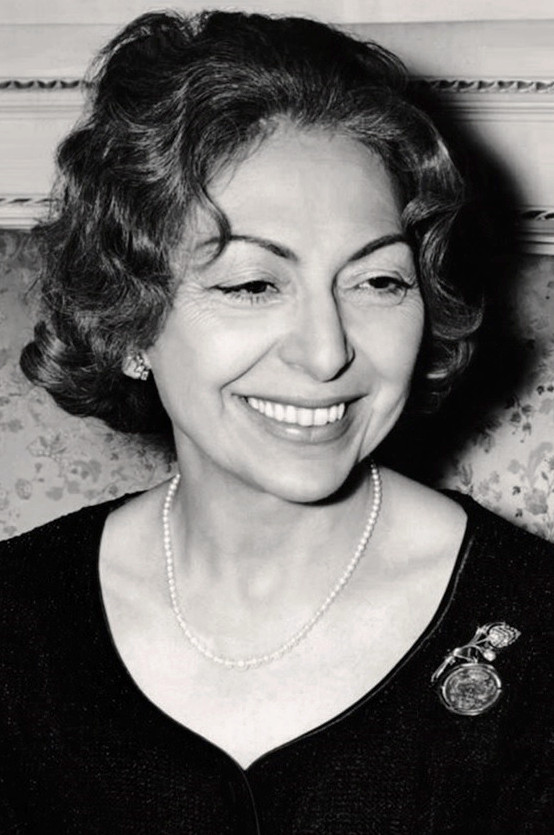
- Born: March 13, 1907; Lisbon, Kingdom of Portugal
- Died: May 6, 1995 (aged 88); Verona, Italy
- Title(s): Duchess of Braganza (as pretender)
- Throne(s) claimed: Portugal
- Pretend from: 1932–1987
- Monarchy abolished: 1910
- Last monarch: Manuel II
- Connection with: Alleged illegitimate half sister
- Royal House: House of Braganza-Saxe-Coburg and Gotha (as pretender)
- Father: Carlos I of Portugal (claimed)
- Mother: Maria Amélia Laredó e Murça
- Spouse: Francesco Javier Bilbao; Giuseppe Manlio Blais; António João da Costa Amado-Noivo
- Children: Fátima Francisca; Maria Cristina; Rosario Poidimani (adopted)
- Predecessor: Manuel II
- Successor: Rosario Poidimani

Maria Pia of Saxe-Coburg and Braganza (March 13, 1907 – May 6, 1995), also known by her literary pseudonym Hilda de Toledano, was a Portuguese writer and journalist who claimed to be the bastard daughter of King Carlos I of Portugal. From 1932 she also claimed the right to the title of Duchess of Braganza and to be the rightful heiress to the throne of Portugal.

Maria Pia of Braganza claimed that King Carlos I legitimized her through a royal decree and placed her in the line of succession, however no proof was presented to demonstrate this and the King similarly did not have the personal authority to do so. Maria Pia's paternity was never proven and her claim to the throne or of royal ancestry never widely accepted.

== Birth and baptism ==
Maria Pia of Saxe-Coburg and Gotha Braganza was born Lisbon, Portugal, allegedly as the royal bastard daughter of an adulterous relationship between King Carlos I of Portugal, then married to Princess Amélie of Orléans, and Maria Amélia Laredó e Murça, the daughter of a wealthy Brazilian couple who had moved to Europe: Armando Maurício Laredó and Maria Amélia Murça e Berhen. Maria Amélia's parents are sometimes given the title "baron", but they did not actually hold any noble title; their wealth and patrician status, however, may have allowed them to use such a title unquestioned.

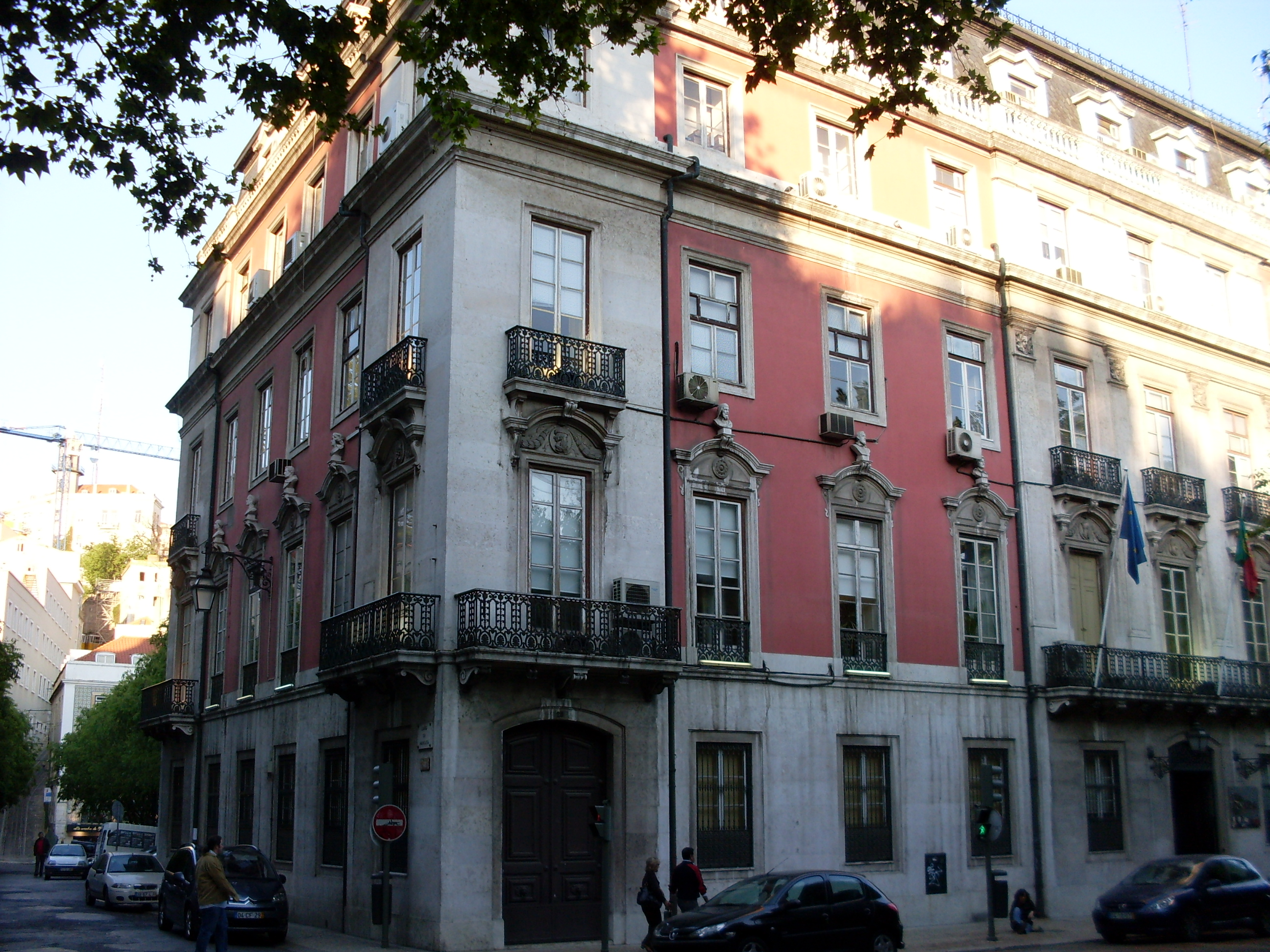
Number 26 Avenida da Liberdade, in Lisbon, where Maria Pia of Braganza was born.

Maria Amélia Laredó e Murça was not married at the time she gave birth to her daughter on March 13, 1907. Maria Pia of Braganza claimed that, shortly thereafter, she was taken by her mother and grandparents to Madrid, Spain. There, she said, she was baptised in the Church of Saint Fermin de los Navarros on April 15, 1907, and that the baptism was registered at the Church of the Blessed Virgin Mary of Mount Carmel and Saint Aloysius. She claimed that her baptismal registration recorded that her father was "D. Carlos de Sassonia-Coburgo y Savoya de la Casa de Braganza de Portugal". This clearly refers to King Carlos I of Portugal, who at the time was married to another woman, Princess Amélie of Orléans.

The original baptismal registers of the Church of the Blessed Virgin Mary of Mount Carmel and Saint Aloysius were destroyed during the Spanish Civil War, and no original birth record of Maria Pia of Braganza has ever been made public. In 1939 the Vicar-General of the Diocese of Madrid-Alcalas issued a baptismal certificate to Maria Pia of Braganza with information provided to him at that time by Don Antonio Goicoechea y Cusculluela, a member of the Spanish parliament and the Governor of the Bank of Spain, who had reportedly been present at the baptism. Subsequently, Maria Pia of Braganza used this baptismal certificate as evidence for her claim to be the recognised daughter of King Carlos.

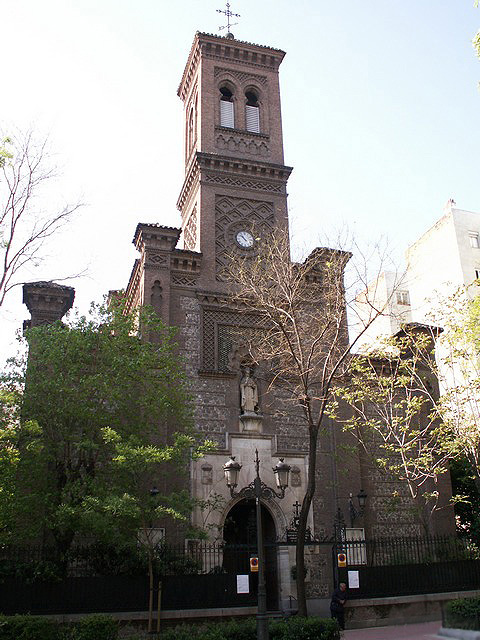
The Church of Saint Fermin de los Navarros, in Madrid, where Maria Pia de Saxe-Coburgo e Bragança was baptized.

Maria Pia of Braganza also claimed that in the archives of the Diocese of Madrid-Alcalá there was a copy of a document signed by King Carlos on March 14, 1907 in which he recognised Maria Pia of Braganza as his daughter and that "she may be called by my name and enjoy from now on the use of this name with the honours, prerogatives, rank, obligations and advantages of the princes of the House of Braganza of Portugal". Like the baptismal certificate, the original of this document did not survive.

== Marriages and children ==
In 1925, at the age of eighteen, Maria Pia of Braganza married Francesco Javier Bilbao y Batista, a Cuban playboy twenty years her senior. He came from a rich family of cattle breeders. Since Bilbao was divorced, the marriage was a civil one only and took place in the Cuban embassy in Paris. They had one daughter, Fátima Francisca Xaviera Iris Bilbao de Saxe-Coburgo e Bragança, in 1932, who became Sister Francisca, a cloistered nun in a convent.

Maria Pia of Braganza lived briefly with Bilbao in Cuba, before returning to Spain. Bilbao died November 15, 1935. Francisca died unmarried in 1982.

To escape the Spanish Civil War, Maria Pia of Braganza moved with her mother to Rome. In 1939, she married Giuseppe Blais, a colonel in the Italian carabinieri. At the time, members of the carabinieri were forbidden from marrying foreigners. The marriage was, therefore, celebrated clandestinely, and was not registered civilly until August 5, 1946. The union proved much happier and together they had a daughter, Maria da Glória Cristina Amélia Valéria Antónia Blais de Saxe-Coburgo e Bragança, born in 1946. Maria Cristina Blais de Saxe-Coburgo e Bragança (in Spain also called María Cristina Blais de Sajonia-Coburgo Braganza) married the Spanish sculptor Miguel Ortíz y Berrocal (1933–2006) and together they lived in Verona and had two sons: Carlos Miguel Berrocal de Saxe-Coburgo e Bragança (born 1976) and Beltrão José Berrocal de Saxe-Coburgo e Bragança (born 1978).

General Blais died in 1983. In 1985, Maria Pia of Braganza married António João da Costa Amado-Noivo (January 28, 1952 – December 29, 1996). At the time of the wedding, Maria Pia was 78, Amado-Noivo 33.

== Literary career ==
Like many society ladies, Maria Pia of Braganza supplemented her income by writing. In the early 1930s she had a number of articles published in two Spanish newspapers Blanco y Negro and ABC.

In 1937, Maria Pia wrote her first book La hora de Alfonso XIII (The Hour of Alfonso XIII) published in Havana, Cuba, by Ucar, Garcia y Companía. This work, written in Spanish and published under the name "Hilda de Toledano", is a defence of King Alfonso XIII of Spain, who was living in exile at the time.

In 1954, Maria Pia wrote Un beso y ... nada más: confidencia consciente de una pecadora inconsciente (A Kiss and ... Nothing More: Conscious Confidences of an Unconscious Sinner) published in Madrid by Plenitud. This novel was also written in Spanish and published under the name "Hilda de Toledano".

In 1957, Maria Pia wrote Mémoires d'une infante vivante (Memoirs of a Living Infanta) published in Paris by Del Duca. This work, written in French and published under the name "Maria Pia de Saxe-Cobourg Bragance", is an autobiography. It marks the first attempt of Maria Pia to receive widespread public recognition for her claim that she was the bastard daughter of King Carlos I of Portugal. In the book, however, Maria Pia makes no claim to any dynastic rights. The book closes with the sentence, "I claim no sceptre but my pen, no crown but that bequeathed by my father and mother: my dignity." Instead, Maria Pia of Braganza suggests that the rightful heir to the Portuguese throne should be Princess Isabelle d’Orléans, eldest child of Henri, Count of Paris.

== Controversies ==
=== Claim to the Portuguese throne ===
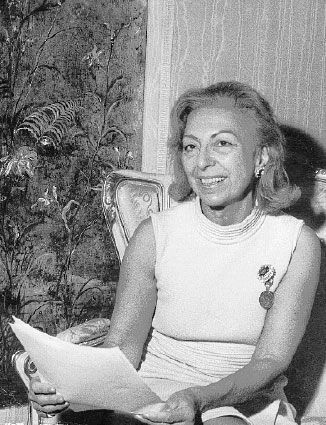
Maria Pia of Braganza in a public speech to the Portuguese people.

For at least several decades Maria Pia had claimed to be the bastard daughter of King Carlos I, and even to be entitled to the style "Her Royal Highness" and the title "Infanta". It was not, however, until 1957 that she claimed to be the rightful queen of Portugal in succession to Manuel II, the son of Carlos I (and the purported half-brother of Maria Pia) who had died childless in 1932.

On July 15, 1957, a group of ten Portuguese monarchists published a petition asking Maria Pia to claim the throne. In 1958 she went to Portugal where she was received by the President Francisco Craveiro Lopes; the Prime Minister, António de Oliveira Salazar, however, refused to meet her. In the presidential elections that year Maria Pia supported the failed candidacy of Humberto Delgado. She continued to support Delgado after he went into exile in Brazil.

From this point forward Maria Pia used the title Duchess of Braganza. She attracted the support of a small minority of monarchists who were actively opposed to Salazar. Maria Pia of Braganza played on the rivalry in monarchist circles between the Miguelists and the constitutionalists, presenting herself as the "constitutional" (i.e. liberal) candidate. The support given to Salazar by Miguel's heir at the time, Duarte Nuno, in the 1950s enabled Maria Pia of Braganza even more to represent herself as the liberal and democratic claimant to the Portuguese throne.

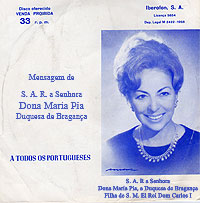
Cover of a vinyl record with speeches from Maria Pia as the Duchess of Braganza.

Maria Pia was very active in her claim to the Portuguese throne. Articles about her appeared in Italian and Portuguese newspapers. In February 1965, she went to Portugal to visit the tomb of King Carlos. As she was leaving Portugal and returning to Spain, she was arrested and held in custody overnight. She was released without charge at the request of the Italian embassy. In 1976, she infamously checked out of a hotel in Lisbon, where she had stayed for several weeks, without paying the bill, claiming simply that as the Duchess of Braganza she was not obligated to pay for her lodging.

Maria Pia mixed frequently with the jet set idle rich. She claimed that for many years she maintained an ongoing friendship with the exiled King Alfonso XIII of Spain and his son Infante Jaime, Duke of Segovia, and this was confirmed by the widow of the latter, Emmanuelle de Dampierre. Much correspondence exists between Maria Pia of Braganza and members of European royal families recording her efforts to gain legitimacy within royal circles, but most of the replies were merely polite but unsupportive.

=== Baptismal certificate ===
In October 1966 Duarte Nuno petitioned an ecclesiastical court of the Diocese of Madrid-Alcala to remove the name of King Carlos from the baptismal certificate of Maria Pia. Duarte Nuno claimed that there was no evidence that King Carlos was the father of Maria Pia. It is unusual for a baptismal registration to record the father of a bastard child. The Roman Ritual instructs the officiating priest only to record the father's name if the father himself requests it or if he is known to be the father from some public authentic document (Titulus XII, caput II). Clearly King Carlos was not present at Maria Pia's baptism, but Maria Pia claimed that the copy of the document purportedly signed by Carlos granting her the rights of the princes of Portugal was sufficient justification in ecclesiastical law for Carlos to be named her father on her baptismal certificate.

In February 1972 the case between Duarte Nuno and Maria Pia moved up to the Sacred Roman Rota, the normal appeal court for the Roman Catholic Church. On December 6, 1972, the court dismissed the claim, on the grounds that Duarte Nuno did not have legal standing in the case, being only the second cousin twice removed of King Carlos. The court did not address the primary question of whether there was sufficient evidence for Carlos being Maria Pia's father and thus named as such on the baptismal certificate. It did, however, question the necessity of changing a certificate which was over sixty years old.

Had the Roman Rota found in favour of Duarte Nuno, his supporters could have said that the court had determined that Carlos was not Maria Pia's father. Since the court found against Duarte Nuno, the supporters of Maria Pia of Braganza were able to say that the court had affirmed the validity of her baptismal certificate and therefore the validity of her claimed parentage – neither of which in fact actually occurred. The court found only that Duarte Nuno did not have the legal standing to bring such a case: "Patres Auditores de Turno ... decreverunt negative, seu non constare de legitimatione actoris ad causam".

=== Legal battle over property ===
In 1982 Maria Pia filed a claim for the restitution of the private real property of the Royal House of Portugal. It was rejected by the Supreme Tribunal of Justice at Lisbon on April 14, 1983. The Court found that Maria Pia had not established the identity of her father, despite the presentation of the same baptismal certificate presented to the court at the Vatican.

=== Rosario Poidimani ===
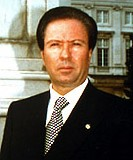
Rosario Poidimani

Rosario Poidimani (born Syracuse, August 25, 1941) is an Italian businessman. On December 2, 1985, Maria Pia signed a document purporting to amend the Portuguese Monarchic Constitution of 1838, and recognising Rosario Poidimani as her eventual heir. On February 19, 1986, she signed a second document affirming that there was a blood relationship between her and Poidimani – but not stating exactly what this relationship was. The Constitution of 1838, which excluded Miguel I of Portugal and his descendants, the present line of the Portuguese Royal family, was revoked in 1842, when the Constitutional Charter of 1826 was reinstated until the Republic, on October 5, 1910.

On April 3, 1987, Maria Pia signed a document abdicating her claim to the Portuguese throne and transferring her claimed rights to Poidimani. In the abdication document she stated that the reason for her action in favour of Poidimani was that she had been "totally deprived of the support of my descent".

Since 1987, Poidimani has styled himself "H.R.H. Dom Rosario of Saxe-Coburg and Gotha Braganza, 22nd Duke of Braganza", and has been active in promoting his claims.

In December 2003, Poidimani brought a libel suit in Italy against Guy Stair Sainty in response to Sainty's analysis of the claims of Maria Pia and Rosario Poidimani, A brief response to statements made by the supporters of the late Maria Pia de Saxe-Coburgo e Bragança, her grandson Carlos Miguel Berrocal y Blais, and her alleged cognate Rosario Poidimani in respect of their claims to the throne of Portugal. In August 2010, Poidimani won a decision against Sainty in the court of Vicenza; for defamation allegedly caused by the article, Sainty was ordered to pay €20,000 in the judgment. However, that judgment was reversed by the Italian Court of Appeal of Venice, no. 730/2016 published March 30, 2016, RG n. 2667/2010, Repert. n. 680/2016 of March 30, 2016.

In 2007, Poidimani was arrested on the charge of fraud in connection with the alleged sale of diplomatic passports; he claimed that he had the right to issue these passports as head of the Royal House of Portugal and as president of the Institute International pour les Relations Diplomatiques (IIRD), an entity founded by Poidimani himself. The Court of Busto Arsizio initially sentenced him to five years in prison in January 2011. However, on April 15, 2013, the Court of Appeal of Milan overturned the conviction and sentence. Poidimani has also initiated a number of complaints and lawsuits against Duarte Pio and against numerous Portuguese government officials.

== Death ==
Maria Pia of Braganza died in Verona, Italy, in 1995. She was buried with her second husband, General Blais, in the Cimitero Monumentale of Verona.

== Analysis ==
Maria Pia's claims, and those of Rosario Poidimani, have hinged upon the truth or falsehood of the following:

1. that she was the illegitimate daughter of King Carlos I;
2. that Carlos I had the constitutional power and the political clout (at a time shortly before his death and the overthrow of his son) to alter the line of succession to the Portuguese throne;
3. that Carlos I both recognized Maria Pia of Braganza as his daughter and declared her a legitimate heir, despite her birth from an adulterine union;
4. that Carlos I was able to do the above without causing public scandal or friction within the royal house, particularly in relation to Amélie of Orléans, his wife and their two sons;
5. that Maria Pia of Braganza, supposedly heir-presumptive, could then marry foreigners and/or commoners (which she did twice), in apparent violation of the Constitution and/or the laws of the Portuguese royal house;
6. that her daughter Maria Cristina of Braganza, and Maria Cristina's sons, all waived their rights of succession;
7. that she adopted Rosario Poidimani according to Italian laws comparable to those of Portugal; and that this adoption did not violate the Portuguese royal house's laws and/or the Constitution; and
8. that she could alter the succession line in favour of Rosario Poidimani, a foreigner and adopted son without authenticated blood relationship to her, although he claimed to be a descendant of Luis I of Portugal.

There are no original documents to support Maria Pia's claims to be both a daughter of Carlos I and an heir to the Dukedom of Braganza and pretender to the throne of Portugal. Maria Pia's baptismal certificate from 1907 was destroyed and there is only a copy of the document in which Carlos I supposedly granted succession rights to her. Nonetheless, there are some records concerning a relationship between Maria Pia's mother Maria Amélia Laredó e Murça and King Carlos I. A biography of Infanta Eulalia of Spain purports to reveal some letters of the Portuguese King and also reveals the existence of Maria Pia of Braganza as King Carlos I's bastard daughter. King Alfonso XIII of Spain and his son Infante Jaime, Duke of Segovia seem to have had an ongoing friendship with Maria Pia; her supporters have interpreted this relationship as an affirmation on the part of Alfonso and Jaime that they recognised Maria Pia of Braganza as Carlos's bastard daughter. In fact, most of the letters cited by Maria Pia in support of her claim were simply courteous replies by royals to her numerous queries and salutations.

Traditionally, the only way in which an illegitimate child of a Portuguese monarch could have been made legitimate and take his or her place in the line of succession was if his or her parents subsequently were married. At the time of Maria Pia's birth, Carlos was married to Queen Amélie and had two sons with her. Children born of adultery were specifically excluded from the line of succession.

Carlos I was a constitutional monarch. He did not claim autocratic power, but instead ruled according to the Constitutional Charter of 1826 which stated that the succession to the throne passed only to legitimate descendants. The Constitution, including all matters of succession, could only be amended by the Cortes. Even if Carlos had signed a document granting succession rights to Maria Pia, it would have had no legal value at all.

Just as Carlos could not unilaterally change the Constitutional Charter and grant Maria Pia succession rights, neither could Maria Pia (even if she were rightful queen of Portugal) unilaterally change the Constitution and grant succession rights to Rosario Poidimani above her daughter and grandsons.

The claims of Maria Pia of Braganza (or Hilda de Toledano) are similar to those of several Europeans born outside marriage who entertain the idea of descent from royalty; the late Enrico Vigo, who claimed the Byzantine Crown, is another example.

== See also ==
- House of Braganza-Saxe-Coburg and Gotha
