= Nowina-Konopka =

Polish noble family

- Szlachta (Polish nobility)
- Current region: Lesser Poland, Galicia
- Origin: 17th century

The Nowina-Konopka family is a Polish noble family (szlachta) bearing the Nowina coat of arms. The family has been documented since the 17th century in Lesser Poland and developed in the 18th and 19th centuries into an influential landed gentry family in the region around Kraków.

== History ==
The Konopka family belongs to the Nowina heraldic clan, one of the traditional armorial communities of the Polish nobility. Members of this clan shared a common coat of arms and formed a broader noble community.

From the 17th century onwards, members of the family were active in Lesser Poland. During the 18th century, the family divided into several branches, which developed geographically and socially in different ways.

== Modlnica–Mogilany branch ==
A major branch of the Nowina-Konopka family settled in Modlnica, near Kraków, in the second half of the 18th century. In 1782, Józef Nowina-Konopka (1739–1811) acquired the Modlnica estate from Michał Łętowski. Under his leadership, the estate became the central possession of this family line. The family retained ownership of the estate until 1945, during which time Modlnica developed into an important cultural and intellectual centre of the regional landed gentry.

In the early 19th century, the branch expanded its holdings. Around 1802, the estate of Mogilany was acquired, which developed into a second major family seat. Under the Konopka family, Mogilany gained a pronounced cultural function. From around 1870, the ethnographer Oskar Kolberg frequently stayed there, working on his documentation of Polish folk culture.

Further expansion followed with the acquisition of additional estates in the Kraków region. In 1802, the estate of Głogoczów also came into the possession of the family and remained in family hands for more than two centuries, making it one of the longest continuously held properties of the Nowina-Konopka family. The manor house, partly dating back to the 16th century and rebuilt in the 19th century, remained in the possession of descendants into modern times and represents a rare example of continuity of a noble estate in southern Poland.

In 1830, a further internal expansion took place when Tadeusz Konopka (1788–1864) acquired the estate of Tomaszowice for his son Roman Konopka, creating a secondary branch of the family while Modlnica and Mogilany remained the principal family centres.

Notable members of this branch include:

- Józef Nowina-Konopka (1739–1811), who acquired Modlnica and laid the foundation for the family's expansion;
- Tadeusz Konopka (1788–1864), author of memoirs and diaries describing the late 18th and early 19th centuries;
- Józef Adam Nowina-Konopka (1818–1880), jurist, ethnographer and politician, who further developed the family estates and strengthened their cultural significance.

== Baronial branch and the Wieliczka Salt Mine ==
A separate branch of the Nowina-Konopka family, represented by Jan and Piotr Konopka, was elevated to the rank of baron on 22 August 1791 by Emperor Leopold II in the Kingdom of Galicia and Lodomeria.

This baronial line was closely connected with the exploitation of the Żupy krakowskie (Kraków saltworks), including the Wieliczka Salt Mine. Although the mines themselves were royal and later state-owned, members of the family acted as leaseholders and officials within the economic system of salt production.

In the 1780s, the family built the Konopka Palace in Wieliczka, which was later taken over by Austrian authorities and integrated into the saltworks infrastructure. The Wieliczka Salt Mine has been listed as a UNESCO World Heritage Site since 1978.

In addition to their involvement in Wieliczka, this branch owned extensive estates in Galicia, the most important of which was Breń. The estate remained in the family for approximately one and a half centuries and formed the centre of their economic and social position in the Dąbrowa Tarnowska region.

In the 19th and early 20th centuries, this branch was represented by figures such as Jan Franciszek Konopka (1855–1948), a landowner and socio-political activist who managed and modernised the family estates.

After World War II, the Breń estate, along with other family properties, was nationalised as part of agrarian reforms.

== Other branches ==
The broader Nowina-Konopka family also included branches active in Greater Poland and the eastern territories of the former Polish–Lithuanian Commonwealth.

A representative of this line was Jan Konopka (1777–1814), a general in the service of Napoleon. He was the son of Franciszek Konopka, a komornik ziemski (land court official responsible for executing legal decisions, particularly concerning property and boundaries).

== Lineage (selection) ==
A simplified genealogical line of the Modlnica–Mogilany branch is as follows:

- Marcin Konopka (1644–1724)
- Adam Konopka (1697–1759)
- Józef Nowina-Konopka (1739–1811)
- Tadeusz Konopka (1788–1864)
- Józef Adam Nowina-Konopka (1818–1880)
- Adam Grzegorz Józef Konopka (1851–1927)
- Adam Konopka (1876–1931)
- Mikołaj Maria Ignacy Konopka (1911–1962)
- Piotr Nowina-Konopka
- Tadeusz Konopka (journalist and correspondent of ANSA)

== Coat of arms ==
The family bears the Polish coat of arms Nowina, belonging to a broader heraldic clan within the Polish nobility.

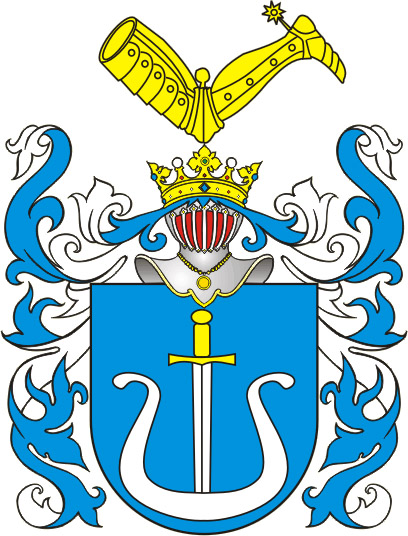
Nowina-Konopka

== See also ==
- Szlachta
- Wieliczka Salt Mine
- Lesser Poland

== Literature ==
- Adam Boniecki, Herbarz Polski
- Seweryn Uruski, Rodzina. Herbarz szlachty polskiej
- Marek Jerzy Minakowski, Genealogia potomków Sejmu Wielkiego
