= Blanco y Negro (magazine) =

Spanish Magazine

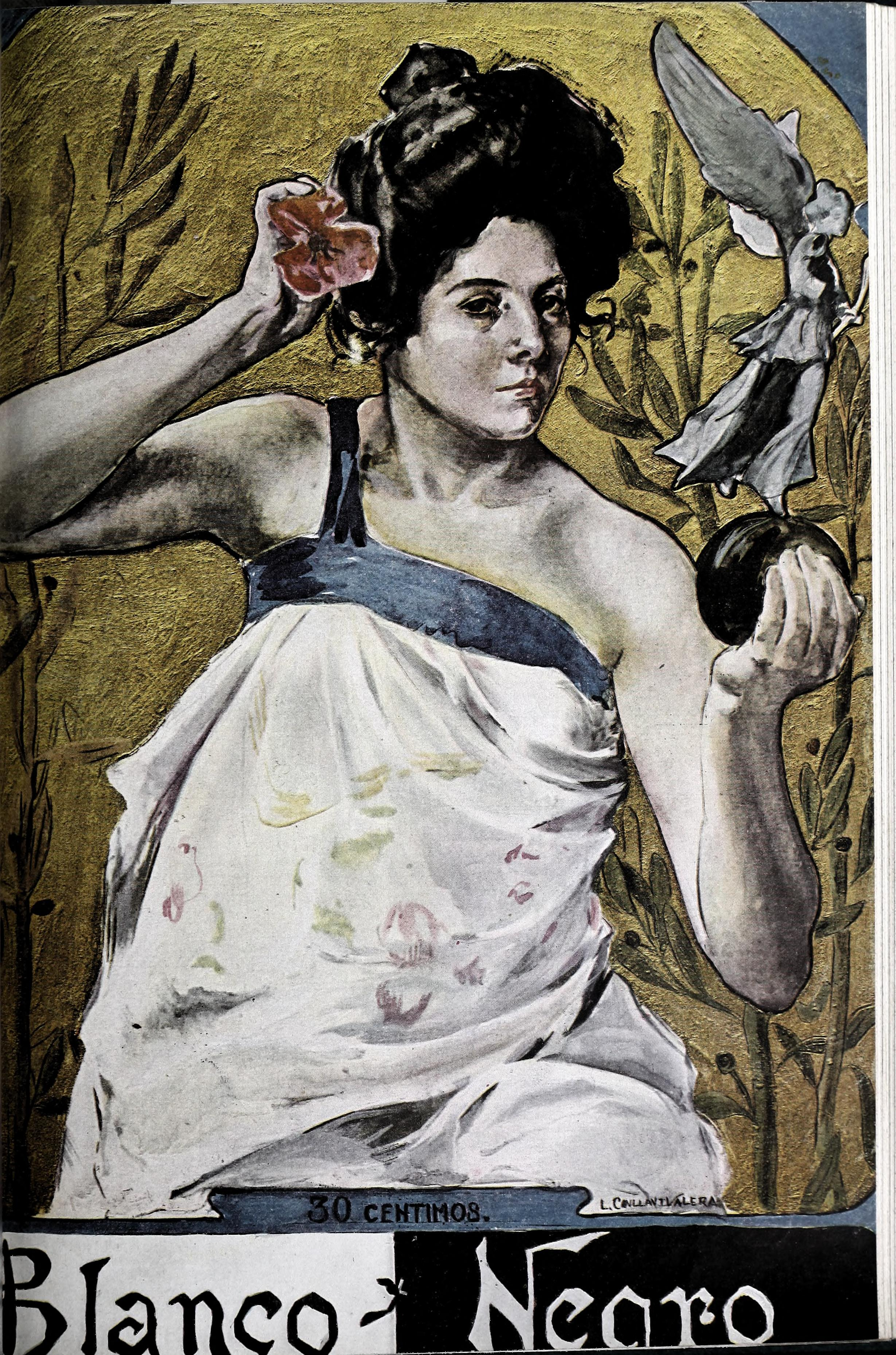
- Categories: Literary magazine
- Frequency: Weekly
- Publisher: Editorial Catolica
- First issue: 1891
- Final issue: 1988
- Country: Spain
- Based in: Madrid
- Language: Spanish

Blanco y Negro (English: "White and Black") was a Spanish-language weekly art and literary magazine and later, the companion of the daily ABC. The magazine was published in Madrid, Spain.

== History and profile ==
Blanco y Negro was established in 1891. The title of the magazine was a reference to the contrasts in life such as laughter and tears and the sad and happy. Its founder was Torcuato Luca de Tena. The magazine was controlled by the Catholic Church through Editorial Catolica which also published it on a weekly basis. The headquarters of the weekly was in Madrid.

Blanco y Negro employed color print, paper couché and advanced image printing techniques such as photoengraving and photogravure for the first time in Spain. In addition, it published the first color photo in the country on 15 May 1912. The magazine covered the articles of various Spanish writers and caricaturists, including Cecilio Pla, Ramon Cilla among the others. Carmen de Icaza, 8th Baroness of Claret's novel Cristina Guzman, profesora de idiomas, was first published in Blanco y Negro in August 1936. The weekly also published articles by Hilda de Toledano (literary pseudonym of Maria Pia of Saxe-Coburg and Gotha Braganza), a writer and famous pretender to the throne of Portugal.

In 1988, Blanco y Negro became a Sunday supplement to the daily newspaper ABC. In 2005, it was renamed ABCD Las Artes y Las Letras and continues as a weekly supplement.

== See also ==
- List of magazines in Spain
