= Grigol Bagration of Mukhrani =

Nobleman from Georgia

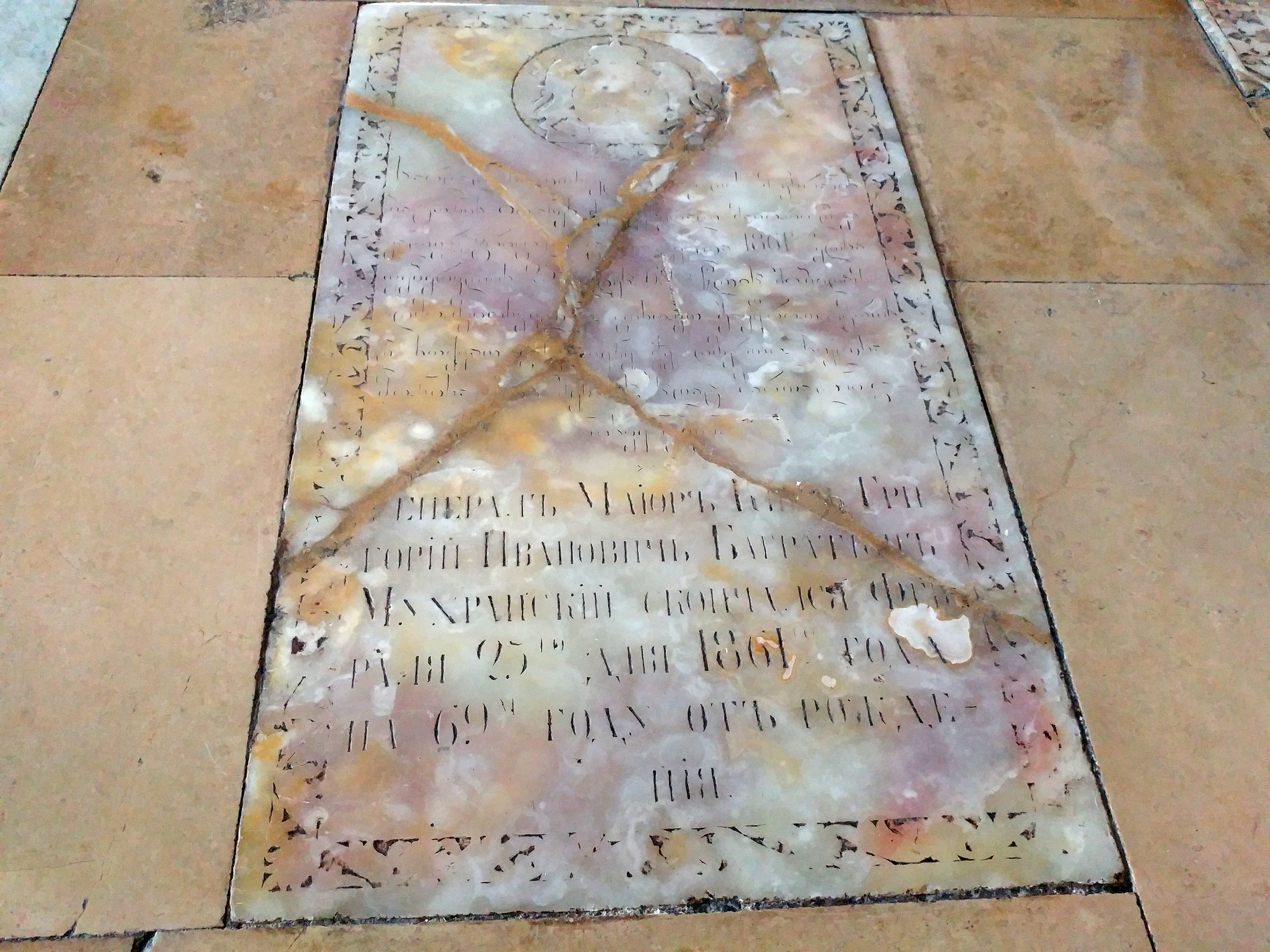
Prince Grigol Bagration of Mukhrani's gravestone

Prince Grigol Bagration of Mukhrani (Georgian: გრიგოლ ბაგრატიონ მუხრანელი) (1787—1861) was a Georgian nobleman of the House of Mukhrani.

== Life ==
Prince Grigol was son of Ioane I, Prince of Mukhrani and was born in 1787. He married Princess Mariam Tsereteli but had no children. He died on 26 February 1861.

Through his mother, Princess Ketevan of Georgia, Prince Ivane Bagration of Mukhrani was his nephew.

He was a Major-General and participant of Russo-Turkish War (1828–29), Russo-Persian War (1826–28) and Caucasian War. He was also a recipient of Order of St. George in 1847.
