= Irakli Bagration of Mukhrani (1813–1892) =

Georgian nobleman

Prince Irakli Konstantines dze Bagration of Mukhrani (Georgian: ირაკლი კონსტანტინეს ძე ბაგრატიონ-მუხრანელი) or Prince Irakli Konstantinovich Bagration-Mukhranski (1813–1892) was a Georgian nobleman of the House of Mukhrani.

== Biography ==
Son of Constantine IV of Mukhrani or Prince Konstantin Ioannovich Bagration-Mukhranski and wife Maria Khorashan Guramishvili or Princess Maria Khorashan Zaalovna Guramova (1786–1831).

In 1848 Irakli married Princess Ketevan Mkhardgrdzéli-Arghutashvili or Princess Ekaterina Ivanovna Argutinskaya-Dolgorukova (1813 - 1880?), daughter of Prince Ioann Mkhardgrdzéli-Arghutashvili or Prince Ivan Zakharievich Argutinsky-Dolgorukov and wife Princess Nina Tumanova, a relative of Prince Cyril Toumanoff. They were parents of eight children:

- Barbare Bagration of Mukhrani (1848–1930)
- Sofia Bagration of Mukhrani (1850–1932)
- Ketevan Bagration of Mukhrani (1852–1918)
- Alexander Bagration of Mukhrani (1853–1918)
- Giorgi Bagration of Mukhrani (1854–1861)
- Tamar Bagration of Mukhrani (1855–1918)
- Levan Bagration of Mukhrani (1862–1888)
- Mikheil Bagration of Mukhrani (1865–1872)
