= Ioane, Prince of Mukhrani =

Georgian prince, diplomat, and military commander

Ioane

Prince of Mukhrani
- Reign: 1778–1801
- Predecessor: Simon
- Successor: Constantine IV
- Born: 12 December 1755
- Died: 1 October 1801 (aged 45)
- Spouse: Princess Ketevan of Georgia
- Issue Among others: Constantine IV, Prince of Mukhrani
- House: Mukhrani
- Father: Constantine III, Prince of Mukhrani
- Religion: Georgian Orthodox Church

Ioane (Georgian: იოანე მუხრანბატონი, romanized: ioane mukhranbat'oni; 12 December 1755 – 1 October 1801) was a Georgian diplomat and military commander. As the head of the Mukhrani branch of the royal Bagrationi dynasty of Kartli, he was Prince (batoni) of Mukhrani and ex officio commander of the Banner of Shida Kartli and Grand Master of the Household (sakhltukhutsesi) at the court of Georgia from 1778 to 1801.

== Biography ==
Tavadi Ioane Bagrationi Signature of Ioane on the Treaty of Georgievsk.

Ioane was a son of Prince Constantine III of Mukhrani. He succeeded to the headship of the House of Mukhrani on the retirement of his relative, Simon. He was a son-in-law and senior official of King Heraclius II of Georgia. In 1783, Ioane signed, together with Prince Garsevan Chavchavadze, the Treaty of Georgievsk whereby Georgia was promised Russian protection and preservation of its throne under the House of Bagrationi. From 1786 to 1795, he was a military governor of the Erivan Khanate, Georgia's tributary state. He was responsible for putting down a revolt against Heraclius' hegemony in the Nakhichevan Khanate in 1786 and commanded elements of Georgian troops at the disastrous battle against the Iranian invasion of Tbilisi in 1795.

== Family ==
Prince Ioane was married to Princess Ketevan, daughter of Heraclius II of Georgia. Their children were:

- Constantine IV (1782–1842), Prince of Mukhrani (1801);
- Teimuraz (1784–1833);
- Barbare (1786–1843);
- Giorgi (Grigol) (1790–1861);
- David-Ioane (1793–1878);
- Tamar (1798–1851);
- Irakli (1800–1816).

Preceded by Simon	Prince of Mukhrani; 1778–1801	Succeeded by Constantine IV
