= Tumanov =

Tumanov (Russian: Туманов) is a Russian masculine surname of Armenian or/and Georgian origin, its feminine counterpart is Tumanova. It may refer to

- Cyril Toumanoff (1913–1997), Russian-born American historian and genealogist
- Tamara Toumanova (1919–1996), Russian-born American ballerina and actress
