= Nowina coat of arms =

Polish coat of arms

Nowina
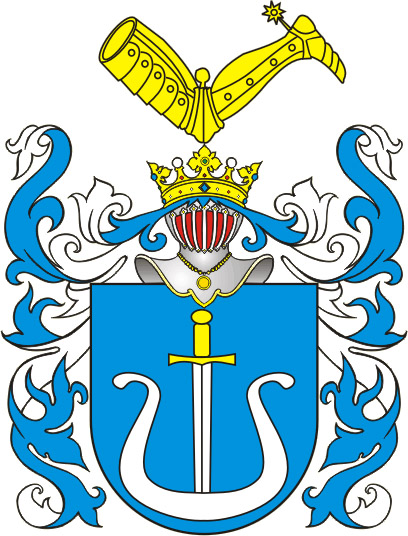
- Battle cry: Złotogoleńczyk
- Alternative names: Nowiny, Nowińczyk, Wojnia, Zawiasa, Złotogoleńczyk
- Earliest mention: 1293 AD
- Families: 157 names as of c.2005 A.D(this list is unedited so there may be a few more) : Axt, Bagnar, Banczalski, Bandoszewski, Barycki, Baynarowicz, Bejnar, Bejnarowicz, Bejner, Białkowski, Bochner, Bochrier, Bodzanek, Bogusławski, Borkowski, Boruta, Boynar, Boznański, Brzączewski, Brzoska, Bulewicz, Byk, Bylinar, Bzowski, Cewowski, Cholejewski, Cholejowski, Chrzanowski, Chrząstowski, Chwalibóg, Czerny, Daćkiewicz, Dalewski, Dobroszewski, Dobrowolski, Dominowski, Druszkowski, Dubasowski, Dulowski, Dworzycki, Dziwlewski, Elbowicz, Enochowicz, Falibowski, Frącewicz, Frincewicz, Frykacz, Gabryszewski, Gałąskowski, Garbowiecki, Garczyński, Giebułtowski, Gissowski, Giszowski, Gizowski, Giżewski, Glasenapp, Glezmierski, Glinka, Gliński, Glizmiński, Gliźmiński, Goczał, Goczałkowski, Gomor, Gośniewski, Grajowski, Gumicki, Gumowicz, Haniewicz, Harasimowicz, Hołdyszowicz, Hulewicz, Ignatowski, Ikmanowski, Jakunowski, Janikowski, Jankowski, Janota, Jelnicki, Jenota, Jezierski, Jeziorski, Kazigordzki, Kędzierzawski, Klimaszewski, Koczmycki, Konarski, Konopacki, Konopka, Konopkowski, Koraczycki, Koropolański, Koseper, Kosla, Koslicki, Kosmycki, Koszmyczski, Kośla, Koślicki, Kowalewski, Koziełło, Kozioł, Kozłowicz, Koźla, Koźmicki, Koźnicki, Krasuski, Krokwicki, Krowicki, Krysztoporski, Krzępowski, Krzysztoforski, Krzysztoporski, Kuflewski, Kuflowski, Kurowicki, Kwassowski, Kwiatkowski, Labeński, Lasotowski, Legawski, Lestwicz, Lissowski, Łabeński, Łabęcki, Ładnowski, Łaganowski, Łękawski, Łośniewski, Łucewicz, Łuczycki, Łysak, Macharzyński, Macherzyński, Maczanowicz, Mantul, Marski, Marzecki, Masiński, Masłoniecki, Maszeński, Maszewski, Maszycki, Maszyński, Mecherzyński, Mełwieński, Mełwiński, Mielżyński, Minocki, Mizgier, Młoszewski, Młoszowski, Mninowski, Moczydłowski, Mościcki, Mrozowski, Mściwojewski, Mściwujewski, Nabora, Naborowski, Nadbor, Nadbora, Naramski, Narembski, Narębski, Nargiełło, Nargieło, Nasuticz, Nasutowicz, Niewiadomski, Niewieski, Nowakowski, Nowaliński, Nowiński, Nowokrzycki, Nowoszycki, Ochocki, Oknicki, Olbierowski, Olbierz, Olbierzowski, Orlicki, Oriesek, Owczarski, Padniewski, Pasiński, Paszyński, Paziński, Perekałski, Perepecza, Pielat, Piestrzecki, Pilat, Pilatowski, Pilchowski, Pilichowski, Piłat, Pitkowski, Pitowski, Pochocki, Podegimski, Popowski, Prądzewski, Przanowski, Przerembski, Przerębski, Przesiecki, Przonowski, Przybylski, Przysiecki, Purwiński, Pytkowski, Pytowski, Radło, Raduski, Rampkowski, Rampowski, Redzi, Rożnowski, Rożnowski de Skoki, Rwieński, Ryszkowski, Rzwieński, Sankowski, Sapiński, Saryński, Sawinicz, Sąpieński, Schocki, Schodzki, Sewalla, Sępiński, Sępowicz, Sitko, Skocki, Skowzgird, Slachciński, Sładkowski, Słodzki, Słomiński, Smagłowski, Sobonowski, Sokolnicki, Spokojski, Sroczycki, Sroczyński, Stępowicz, Sworcz, Szaracki, Szczygielski, Szlachcicki, Szlachciński, Szlachta, Szupiński, Szwarc, Szytko, Ślachciński, Świątecki, Świerznia, Świrczyna, Świrczyński, Tomecki, Ujadzki, Ujazdski, Ujejski, Uła, Wandrycz, Watowski, Wieski, Wilkowski, Witkowski, Wojecki, Wojutyński, Wycieszewski, Wydzierzewski, Wydzierzowski, Wygierżewski, Załuski, Zarczycki, Zarzycki, Zasczyński, Zaszczyński, Zimnowski, Złotnicki, Zwęcki, Żarcicki, Żarczycki, Żeromski

Nowina (Polish pronunciation: [nɔˈvina]) is a Polish coat of arms. It was used by several Polish noble families in the times of the Polish–Lithuanian Commonwealth. The original clan consisted of only 24 families.

== History ==
Nowina is one of the oldest Polish heraldic marks with claims that it existed prior to 960 CE. However, the earliest known depiction was on a seal of Nacislaw of Dobrosolow of the Nowina clan in 1293 CE. It was first mentioned in a court registry of 1392 and spread across the families of Greater Poland and the lands of Kraków, Lublin, Sandomierz and Sieradz. After the Union of Horodło of 1413 CE several boyar families adopted this coat of arms. The representative of the Nowina clan adopted the nobility of Lithuanian descent was Mikołaj of Sepno, while the newcomers were represented by Mikołaj Bejnar.

== Blazon ==
Azure, a cauldron's handle Argent, with both ends upwards. Between them a cross or a sword proper, with the handle upwards. Out of the crest coronet an armoured leg bent in the knee as if kneeling. Foot directed leftwards.

== Notable bearers ==
- Hetman Fylyp Orlyk (1672–1742), secretary and close associate of Hetman Ivan Mazepa, diplomat, Hetman of Zaporizhian Host in exile
- Hryhoriy Orlyk (1702–1759), Ukrainian-born French military commander, special envoy and member of Louis XV's secret intelligence service
- Jan Przerębski (?–1523), castellan of Sieradz
- Jan Przerębski (1519–1562), Crown chancellor, secretary of the Crown, royal secretary, nominee for the bishopric of Chełm
- Stefan Przanowski (1874–1938), Minister of Provisions, Minister of Food and Control, Minister of Industry and Trade, Disputed 7th Prime Minister of Poland
- Edward Przanowski(1845–1929), soldier of the January Uprising, committee president of the Public Charity Council of the Łęczyca County, chief engineer and architect in Słupca and Łęczyca, chieftain and chairman of the Łęczyca volunteer fire brigade
- Jerzy Krasuski (1930–2009), historian, specializing in the history of the nineteenth and twentieth centuries
- Anton Luckievič (1884–1942), Prime Minister and Minister of Foreign Affairs of the Belarusian Democratic Republic
- Marcin Szlachciński (1511/1512–?), scholar, translator, poet, philosopher and professor at the Jagiellonian University
- Marian Przysiecki (1905–1943), economist, agronomist, officer of the Home Army
- Michał Jankowski (1842–1912), pioneer of the Russian Far East, naturalist and breeder
- Mikołaj Złotnicki (?–1694), cup-bearer to John III Sobieski
- Olga Boznańska (1865–1940), painter, portraitist and representative of Modernism
- Stanisław Brzóska (1832–1865), priest, general, one of leaders of the Polish insurgency and the last partisan of the January Uprising
- Halshka Hulevychivna (1570s - 1642), noblewoman and philanthropist from Ukraine, active in the Polish-Lithuanian Commonwealth
- Devil Boruta - fictional character, a devil from Polish folklore

== See also ==
- Polish heraldry
- Heraldry
- Coat of arms
