= Guy Stair Sainty =

British art dealer

Guy Stair Sainty KStJ KC*SG
- Born: 7 December 1950 (age 75); Hassocks, Sussex, England
- Education: Westminster School; University of Rome; College of Law
- Occupation: Art dealer
- Spouses: Cynthia Holland Ash Volk (m. 1983; div. 1993) Elizabeth Frost Pierson (m. 1995)
- Children: 6
- Parent(s): Christopher Lawrence Sainty and Virginia Cade Stair
- Relatives: John Sainty (half-brother)

Guy Stair Sainty, KStJ KC*SG (born 7 December 1950) is a British art dealer and author on nobility, royal genealogy, and heraldry.

== Life and education ==
Guy Stair Sainty is the son of Christopher Lawrence Sainty and Virginia Cade Stair, granddaughter of Alfred Stair. His father was Chief Engineer and Director of Carrier Engineering Co Ltd. He attended Highfield School in Hampshire and Westminster School, London, and continued his education in Rome and at The College of Law in London. In 1979, he moved to New York but returned to Europe in 2002, first to Paris and then to London where the Stair Sainty Gallery has been based since 2005. The gallery specialises primarily in French and Spanish painting from the sixteenth to the early twentieth century and has sold works of art to many of the world's great museums, publishing catalogues on a range of artists and schools.

He married, firstly, on 5 February 1983, Cynthia Holland Ash Volk, with three children, Charles, Clementine, and Della. The marriage ended in divorce in 1993 and ecclesiastical annulment in 1995. Sainty married Elizabeth Frost Pierson, the daughter of W. DeVier Pierson and Shirley Phelps Pierson, née Frost, a private dealer in 19th and 20th century art in New York, in Washington on 28 May 1995 and in a second ceremony at the London Oratory on 28 September 1995. With Elizabeth he had three children, George, Julian and Arabella.

Sainty is a half-brother, by his father's first wife, of Sir John Sainty, retired Clerk of the Parliaments.

== Publications ==
- Sacred Military Order of Constantine of Saint George 1976
- First Painters of the King: French Royal Taste from Louis XIV the Revolution 1985
- François Boucher: His Circle and Influence 1987
- The Orders of Chivalry and Merit of the Bourbon Two Sicilies Dynasty 1989
- Eighty Years of French Painting: 1775-1855 1991
- The Orders of Saint John 1991
- La Insigne Orden de Tosón de Oro 1996
- Romance and Chivalry: Literature and History Reflected in Early 19th Century French Painting 1996
- An Eye on Nature II: French Landscape Painting from 1785-1900 1999
- World Orders of Knighthood and Merit (ISBN 0971196672) 2006. With Rafal Heydel-Mankoo
- The Constantinian Order of Saint George, Boletín Oficial del Estado, 2018 (ISBN 978-84-340-2506-6).

== Appointments, awards, and decorations ==
Sainty has had an interest in the subject of chivalry and heraldry for many years. He is a Fellow with the International Commission on Orders of Chivalry. Sainty is a correspondent member of the Real Academia Matritense de Heraldica y Genealogia (Royal Academy of Heraldry and Genealogy of Madrid). He has served for more than twenty years as one of the consultants to the Committee on the Orders of Saint John of the Sovereign Military Order of Malta and The Alliance of the Orders of St. John of Jerusalem.

Sainty has served as a County Staff Officer (Sussex) in the St. John Ambulance. He was first appointed an Associate Officer (Brother), then promoted to an Associated Commander (Brother) on 16 June 1989, and again promoted to the rank of Associate Knight of the Venerable Order of Saint John on 30 July 1992. He was transferred to full membership as a knight of Justice with the change of Statutes in 1999, and served as Vice-Chancellor of the Priory in the US until June 2008, but has since transferred to the central roll of the Order.

Sainty is an armiger, having had arms granted by the College of Arms in London, and matriculated at the Court of the Lord Lyon in Edinburgh. Sainty has also served as a senior county staff officer to H.R.H. Prince Tomislav of Yugoslavia. He was formerly a member of the Savoy Order of Saints Maurice and Lazarus but resigned in 2006 and is the Vice-Grand Chancellor of the Sacred Military Constantinian Order of Saint George (Hispano-Neapolitan branch), of which he is a Bailiff Grand Cross. In 2018 the Boletín Oficial del Estado published "The Constantinian Order of Saint George" by Sainty, the first publication in English by the BOE, with a translation in Spanish published in 2020.

On 15 January 2014, Sainty was awarded the rank of Commander (Encomienda) of the Order of Isabella the Catholic by King Juan Carlos I and received unrestricted permission to wear the decorations on 27 July 2017.

- (United Kingdom) Knight of Justice of the Venerable Order of Saint John of Jerusalem
- (Holy See) Knight Commander with Star of the Order of Saint Gregory the Great
- (Spain) Commander (Encomienda) of the Order of Isabella the Catholic
- Bailiff Grand Cross of the Sacred Military Constantinian Order of Saint George
- Knight of the Order of Saint Januarius

== Libel suit by Rosario Poidimani ==
In December 2003, Rosario Poidimani sued Sainty in an Italian court for libel, on account of his published analysis of the claims to the Portuguese throne of Maria Pia de Saxe-Coburgo e Bragança and Rosario Poidimani. In August 2010, Poidimani won a decision against Sainty in the court of Vicenza. For defamation allegedly caused by the article, Sainty was ordered to pay €20,000 in the judgment. In March 2016, the Italian Court of Appeal of Venice decided in Sainty's favour, rejecting the claim of Poidimani. (No. 730/2016 published 30/03/2016, RG n. 2667/2010, Repert. n. 680/2016 of 30.03.2016.)
