= Mikołaj Złotnicki =

King's Cup-Bearer of the Crown

Mikołaj Złotnicki (died 4 July 1694) was a Great Officer of the Crown under John III Sobieski, as Crown Cupbearer, since 1688.
