= Constantine IV, Prince of Mukhrani =

Prince of Mukhrani (1782–1842)

Constantine IV
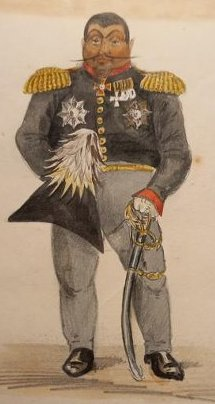
- Portrait of Constantine IV, 1830s.

Prince of Mukhrani
- Reign: 1801
- Predecessor: Ioane
- Born: 1782
- Died: 7 September 1842 (aged 59–60)
- Spouse: Khoreshan Guramishvili
- Issue Among others: Ivane; Irakli
- House: Mukhrani
- Father: Ioane, Prince of Mukhrani
- Mother: Princess Ketevan of Georgia
- Religion: Georgian Orthodox Church

Constantine IV (Georgian: კონსტანტინე IV მუხრანბატონი, romanized: k'onst'ant'ine IV mukhranbat'oni; Russian: Константин Иванович Багратион-Мухранский, Konstantin Ivanovich Bagration-Mukhransky; 1782 – 7 September 1842) was the head of the Mukhrani branch of the Bagrationi dynasty of Georgia and the last Prince (batoni) of Mukhrani and ex officio commander of the Banner of Shida Kartli and Grand Master of the Household (msakhurt-ukhutsesi) of Georgia in 1801. Afterwards, he was in the service of the Russian Empire, ending his career with the rank of general.

== Biography ==
Constantine was the eldest son of Ioane I, Prince of Mukhrani, and Princess Ketevan of Georgia, daughter of King Heraclius II of Georgia. He succeeded to the headship of the House of Mukhrani on the death of his father in October 1801. In the last years of the Georgian monarchy, he was among those dignitaries who saw Georgia's future within the Russian realm and opposed accession of Prince David, son of the ailing King George XII, to the throne of Georgia. When Georgia was annexed by Russia in 1801, the status of Mukhrani as a sovereign feudatory was revoked and the nobility of Georgia was integrated with that of Russia. Constantine's loyalty to the new regime was rewarded with the rank of colonel in 1808 and of major-general in 1817. In 1830, he was elected as the first Marshal of Nobility of the Tiflis Governorate, a move opposed by the general and poet Prince Alexander Chavchavadze. He retired from military service in 1838 with the right to a rank of lieutenant-general.

== Family ==
Constantine IV was married to Khoreshan (1789–1831), daughter of Prince Zaal Guramishvili. Their children were:

- Ivane (1812–1895);
- Irakli (1813–1890);
- Alexander (1817–1851);
- Giorgi (1820–1877);
- Ekaterine;
- Mariam (born 1826);
- Mikheil (1831–1907),
  - Alexander (1856-1935), chamberlain
    - Konstantine (1889–1915).

Preceded by Ioane	Prince of Mukhrani; 1801	Succeeded by Principality abolished
