= Golovachev =

Golovachev, Golovachov, Golovachyov (feminine: Golovachova) is a Russian family name, a patronymic from the nickname Golovach ("big headed"). It is also the name of a Russian noble Golovachyov family raising to prominence in the 16th century. Notable people with the surname include:

- Apollon Golovachyov (1831–1877), Russian journalist, literary critic, publicist, publisher and editor
- Andrei Golovachyov (born 1967), Russian serial killer
- Aleksandr Golovachev (1909–1945), Soviet colonel, twice Hero of the Soviet Union
- Ivan Golovachyov (born 1929), Soviet canoeist
- Nikolai Golovachev (born 1823, died 1887), a Russian general, participant in the Caucasian War and Turkestan campaigns
- Pavel Golovachev (1917–1972), Soviet ace, twice Hero of the Soviet Union
- Vasili Golovachyov (1948–2025), Soviet and Russian speculative fiction writer
- Yevdokiya Golovacheva, birth name of Yevdokiya Nagrodskaya (1866–1930), Russian novelist
