= Argutinsky-Dolgorukov =

Georgian and Russian noble family

Coat of arms of the Princes Argutinsky-Dolgorukov

The House of Arghutyan-Yerkaynabazuks, Mkhargrdzeli-Arghutashvilis (Armenian: Արղության-Երկայնաբազուկ, Georgian: მხარგრძელი-არღუთაშვილი), later known as Argutinsky-Dolgorukov (Russian: Аргутинский-Долгоруков) were a Georgian and Russian noble family of Armenian descent whose double surname indicates their descent from Arghut and the family's purported origin from the medieval House of Mkhargdzeli (Zakaryan-Zachariads). "Dolgorukov" is a direct Russian translation of "Mkhargrdzeli" or "Yerkaynabazuk", literally respectively meaning in Georgian and Armenian "a long-arm".

== History ==
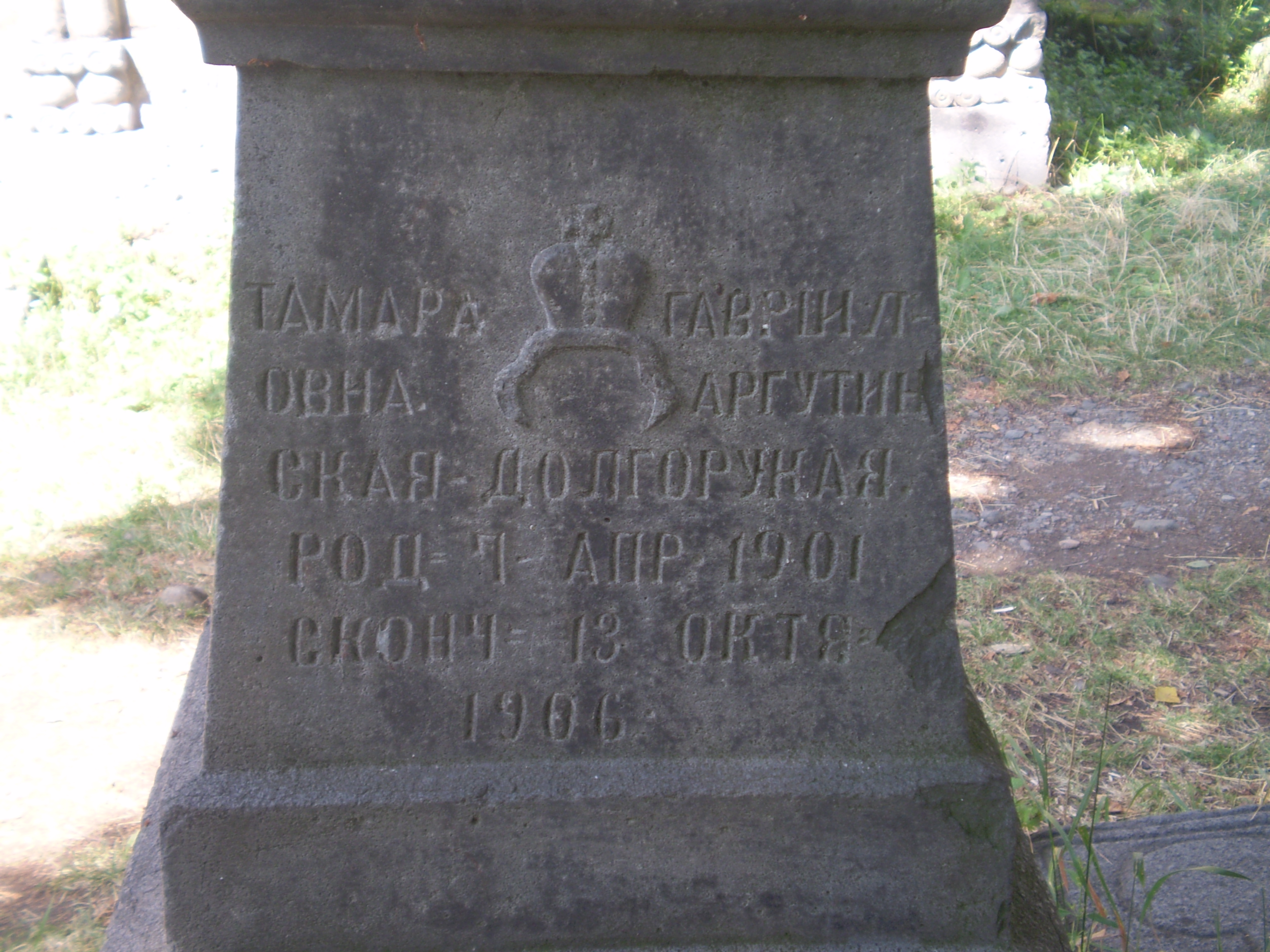
Tombstone of a member of the Argutinsky-Dolgorukov family at the courtyard of Sanahin monastery.

The founder of the family, Arghut, established himself in Lori, northern Armenia, then under Georgian control, at the end of the 15th century. His descendants were received among the lower-class nobility (aznauri) of Georgia, and enfeoffed of Sanahin, where the family's dynastic abbey was located. Under King Heraclius II of Georgia, the Arghutashvili family was officially recognized as descended from the Mkhargrdzeli and elevated to a princely rank (Georgian: tavadi, Russian: knyaz), a title which was confirmed by the Imperial Russian government on March 6, 1819; December 15, 1838; and November 14, 1857.

In contrast to the commonly accepted view, the Russian historian Pyotr Dolgorukov advanced a hypothesis of the family's Rurikid origin and attempted to trace the common ancestry of Argutinsky-Dolgorukov and the Rurikid house of Dolgorukov to the 12th-century prince Yuri Dolgoruki.
