= Kaikhosro, Prince of Mukhrani =

Georgian prince

Kaikhosro

Prince of Mukhrani
- Reign: 1625–1626
- Predecessor: Teimuraz I
- Successor: Prince David of Kakheti
- Died: 3 October 1629
- Spouse: Tinatin Gurieli
- Issue Among others: Ashotan II, Prince of Mukhrani; Catholicos-Patriarch Domentius III
- House: Mukhrani
- Father: Vakhtang I, Prince of Mukhrani
- Religion: Georgian Orthodox Church

Kaikhosro (Georgian: ქაიხოსრო მუხრანბატონი, romanized: kaikhosro mukhranbat'oni; died 3 October 1629) was a Georgian tavadi ("prince") of the House of Mukhrani, a collateral branch of the royal Bagrationi dynasty of Kartli. He was Prince (Mukhranbatoni) of Mukhrani, ex officio commander of the Banner of Shida Kartli, and regent of Kartli from 1625 to 1626. During the civil war in 1626, Kaikhosro sided with Giorgi Saakadze against Teimuraz I and followed him into exile in the Ottoman Empire, where they both, after three years of military service, were accused of treason and put to death.

== Biography ==
Kaikhosro was a son of Vakhtang I, Prince of Mukhrani, and a younger brother of Teimuraz I, Prince of Mukhrani, on whose death at the battle of Marabda against Safavid Iran he succeeded to the fief of Mukhrani in 1625. Kaikhosro was allied with the warlord Giorgi Saakadze, who helped him to become regent of Kartli during the anti-Iranian rebellion to the chagrin of his rival Zurab, Duke of Aragvi. Zurab, suspicious of the tandem's designs and inclined to believe that his brother George, who was married to Kaikhosro's daughter, was part of a plot against him, had George blinded and made an alliance with Teimuraz I, whom Saakadze tried to prevent from acceding to the throne of Kartli.

The split in the ranks of Georgian nobility degenerated to a civil war in 1626. Saakadze and Kaikhosro were defeated by Teimuraz and his party at Bazaleti and fled to the Ottoman Empire, where they entered the sultan's military service. Mukhrani was taken over by Teimuraz I and given in possession to his son David, while children and nephews of Kaikhosro took refuge in western Georgia, in the Kingdom of Imereti. Saakadze and Kaikhosro both fell victim to intrigues at the Ottoman court. They were accused of treason and beheaded at the order of Grand Vizier Gazi Hüsrev Pasha in 1629.

== Family ==
Kaikhosro was married to Tinatin (died 1627), daughter of Mamia II Gurieli, Prince of Guria. They had three sons and three daughters:

- Ashotan II (died 1697), Prince of Mukhrani (1688–1692); (Note: According to Cyril Toumanoff, Ashotan II was a son of Constantine I, Prince of Mukhrani;)
- Bagrat (fl. 1618–1622), who married Ketevan, a daughter of Prince Paremuz Amilakhvari. They had two sons, Simon (fl. 1659–1665) and Nikoloz (fl. 1665–1687), the latter becoming bishop of Bolnisi. His descendants survived until 19th century;
- Domentius III of Georgia (died 1676), Catholicos Patriarch of Georgia (1660–1676);
- Dedisimedi (died 1671), who married Papuna Tsitsishvili (died 1663), Prince of Lower Satsitsiano;
- Helen (fl. 1627–1675), who married George, son of Nugzar, Duke of Aragvi;
- Tinatin, who married Prince Elizbar Davitishvili.

== Notes ==
Preceded by Vakhtang I	Prince of Mukhrani; 1625–1626	Succeeded by David
