= Ashotan II =

Georgian prince of house of Mukhrani

Prince of Mukhrani
- Reign: 1688–1692
- Predecessor: Teimuraz II
- Successor: Papua
- Died: 1697
- Spouse: Ana
- Issue: Kaikhosro; Jesse, Prince of Mukhrani; Tinatin
- Dynasty: Bagrationi
- Father: Kaikhosro, Prince of Mukhrani
- Mother: Tinatin Gurieli
- Religion: Georgian Orthodox Church

Ashotan II (Georgian: აშოთან II მუხრანბატონი, romanized: ashotan II mukhranbat'oni; died 1697) was a Georgian tavadi ("prince") of the House of Mukhrani, a collateral branch of the royal Bagrationi dynasty of Kartli. He was Prince (batoni) of Mukhrani and ex officio commander of the Banner of Shida Kartli from 1688 to 1692.

== Biography ==
Prince Ashotan was son of Kaikhosro, Prince of Mukhrani (or of Constantine I, Prince of Mukhrani, according to the genealogist Cyril Toumanoff). Ashotan was allied with his relative, King George XI, who was deposed by the Safavid Shah Suleiman I in 1688. The rival Georgian royal, Heraclius I, of the Kakhetian Bagrationi, acceded to the throne of Kartli and began demoting the associates of George XI. The leading nobles of Kartli, Ashotan of Mukhrani included, lost their fiefs and privileges.

== Family ==
Ashotan II was married to a certain Ana (fl. 1687). They had three children:

- Kaikhosro (fl. 1672–1700);
- Jesse (died 1716), Prince of Mukhrani (1700);
- Tinatin (fl. 1700–1712).

== Notes ==
| Preceded by Teimuraz II | Prince of Mukhrani; 1688–1692 | Succeeded by Papua |
