= Jesse, Prince of Mukhrani =

Georgian prince

Iese Mukhranbatoni (Georgian: იესე მუხრანბატონი; died 1716) was a Georgian nobleman of the House of Mukhrani, a collateral branch of the royal Bagrationi dynasty of Kartli. He was Prince (batoni) of Mukhrani and ex officio commander of the Banner of Shida Kartli and Grand Master of the Household (msakhurt-ukhutsesi) at the court of Kartli c. 1700.

Iese was a son of Ashotan II, Prince of Mukhrani, and succeeded his cousin Constantine II, Prince of Mukhrani.

Jesse had a son, Ashotan (died 1750)

Preceded by Constantine II	Prince of Mukhrani c. 1700	Succeeded by Papua
