= Kristine de Bagration-Mukhrani =

Georgian princess

Princess Kristine de Bagration-Mukhrani
- Born: Kristine Dzidziguri; 20 September 1989 (age 37); Tbilisi, Georgia
- Spouse: Prince Juan de Bagration-Mukhrani (m. 2014)
- Issue: Prince Bagrat de Bagration-Mukhrani (b. 2021)
- House: Dzidziguri (by birth); Bagrationi (by marriage)
- Occupation: sociologist, model

Princess Kristine de Bagration-Mukhrani (née Dzidziguri; Georgian: ქრისტინე ძიძიგური; 20 September 1989) is a Georgian sociologist, fashion model, and former beauty pageant contestant. She is a member of the House of Mukhrani, a branch of the Bagrationi dynasty, through her marriage to Prince Juan de Bagration-Mukhrani.

== Early life and ancestry ==
Princess Kristine was born on 20 September 1989 in Tbilisi, Georgia to Teimuraz "Temur" Dzidziguri, a surgeon, and his wife, Lali Vashakidze, a veterinarian. The Dzidziguri family is a historic family belonging to the Aznauri (gentry) rank of Georgian nobility, tracing its roots back to the Principality of Mingrelia and the Kingdom of Imereti in the western part of Georgia. Following the Russian Empire's annexation of western Georgia in 1801, the family was formally integrated into the imperial class system and recognized as part of the minor, hereditary Russian nobility (dvoryanstvo).

== Education and career ==
She studied French culture and civilization at the Sorbonne before returning to Tbilisi to study sociology.

In 2008 she was awarded the title of Vice Miss Georgia. She was first-runner up at the 2010 Miss Georgia contest. After Miss Georgia she competed in the Miss Tourism International pageant. She is one of the highest paid models in Georgia, signed with City Models, and has frequently posed for Christian Dior.

== Personal life ==
In 2014 she met Prince Juan de Bagration-Mukhrani, a member of the House of Mukhrani, a branch of the Bagrationi dynasty which formally ruled Georgia until it was conquered by the Russian Empire. They were married in a civil ceremony on 10 May 2014 in Ronda, Spain. They began planning a religious ceremony, but were delayed due to a halt in political and social negotiations and because of Prince Juan's father, Prince Bagrat de Bagration y de Baviera,'s declining health. His father died on 20 March 2017, and the couple decided to allow a one-year mourning period before organizing the wedding. On 3 June 2018 they married in a Georgian Orthodox ceremony at Svetitskhoveli Cathedral. The day before the wedding, they had received a blessing from Ilia II of Georgia, the Catholicos-Patriarch of All Georgia. A reception was held at the Palace of Mukhrani.

After their wedding the couple honeymooned in Indonesia, where they attended the Tomohon International Flower Festival. While in Indonesia they also made an official visit to the Agung Rai Museum of Art.
