= Heraclius II, Prince of Mukhrani =

Georgian nobleman

Heraclius II

Prince of Mukhrani
- Reign: 1717–1719
- Predecessor: Constantine II
- Successor: Levan
- Born: 1666
- Died: 1723 (aged 56–57)
- Issue Among others: David; Mamuka, Prince of Mukhrani
- House: Mukhrani
- Father: Constantine I, Prince of Mukhrani
- Mother: Darejan Abashidze
- Religion: Georgian Orthodox Church

Heraclius II (Georgian: ერეკლე II მუხრანბატონი, romanized: erek'le II mukhranbat'oni; 1666–1723) was a Georgian nobleman of the House of Mukhrani, a collateral branch of the royal Bagrationi dynasty of Kartli. He was Prince (batoni) of Mukhrani and ex officio commander of the Banner of Shida Kartli and Grand Master of the Household (msakhurt-ukhutsesi) at the court of Kartli from 1717 to 1719.

== Biography ==
Heraclius was a son of Constantine I, Prince of Mukhrani, by his wife Darejan Abashidze. He was involved in internecine fighting which followed the forced detention of Vakhtang VI in Safavid Iran. Eventually, Heraclius was dispossessed of his offices and blinded at the order of Vakhtang's son Prince Bakar. Mukhrani was turned over to Heraclius' relative, Levan.

== Family ==
Heraclius was married to a princess of the Kherkheulidze family. They had two sons:

- David (died 1729);
- Mamuka (died 1735), Prince of Mukhrani (1730–1735).

Preceded by Constantine II	Prince of Mukhrani; 1717–1719	Succeeded by Levan
