= Vakhtang I, Prince of Mukhrani =

Vakhtang I

Prince of Mukhrani
- Reign: 1540–1580
- Predecessor: Bagrat
- Successor: Heraclius I

Regent of Kartli
- Regency: 1569–1578
- Born: 1510
- Died: 1 October 1580 (aged 69–70)
- Issue: Bagrat; Teimuraz I, Prince of Mukhrani; Kaikhosro, Prince of Mukhrani
- House: Mukhrani
- Father: Bagrat, Prince of Mukhrani
- Mother: Helen
- Religion: Georgian Orthodox Church

Vakhtang I (Georgian: ვახტანგ I მუხრანბატონი, romanized: vakht'ang I mukhranbat'oni; c. 1510 – 1 October 1580) was a Georgian tavadi ("prince") of the House of Mukhrani, a collateral branch of the royal Bagrationi dynasty of Kartli, and Prince (batoni) of Mukhrani from 1540 until his death in 1580. At the same time, he was an ex officio commander of the Banner of Shida Kartli. In the absence of his relative, King Simon I of Kartli, in the captivity in Safavid Iran, Vakhtang was installed by the nobility as a regent in opposition to the pro-Safavid regime of David XI (Daud Khan) from 1569 to 1579.

== Family background ==
Vakhtang was born around 1510, and was the son of Bagrat, Prince of Mukhrani, the founder of the House of Mukhrani and a younger son of Constantine II, the last de jure king of a unified Georgia. while his mother is apparently a princess named Helen (whose origins are unknown).

In 1540 (or 1539), his father abdicated to enter monastic orders under the name of Barnabas. He died some time later (around 1540), but his eldest son had already succeeded him. He inherits a principality which was created in 1512 as a buffer zone between the Kingdom of Kartli and Kakheti, which were on the brink of war. During his reign, he suffered several attacks from Muslim invaders. In 1554, the Safavid invasion forced Vakhtang and his family into a temporary exile to Samtskhe. One of brothers, Archil, was captured by the Iranian military in 1557 and another, Ashotan, was killed when the mountaineers of Pkhovi raided Mukhrani in 1561.

== Regent of Kartli ==
In 1569, the Safavid forces made Simon I of Kartli prisoner and the Shah Tahmasp I placed Simon's Islamized brother David XI (Daud Khan) on the throne of Kartli. David's authority was limited to the areas tightly controlled by the Iranian military as most of the Christian nobles of Kartli refused to recognize a Muslim overlord and made Vakhtang a regent of Kartli. In 1578, Kartli once again became a battleground of the Ottoman–Safavid war. After Daud Khan burned down his capital, Tbilisi, before abandoning it to the Ottoman army under Lala Mustafa Pasha, Vakhtang, as a regent of Kartli, sent Bardzim, Prince Amilakhvari, and Elizbar, Duke of Ksani, to come to common terms with the victor, saving, as the 18th-century historian Prince Vakhushti put it, "the people from annihilation".

In October 1578, Simon I, released by the shah from captivity, returned to Kartli and struck at the Ottoman garrisons as well as his old foes. One of them, Bardzim Amilakhvari, was arrested and, as Vakhtang tried to intercede, he too was imprisoned by Simon at the castle of Kekhvi. Simon's wife, Nestan-Darejan, moderated the king's anger and Vakhtang was soon released. He died shortly thereafter, in 1580, being succeeded as Prince of Mukhrani by his son, Teimuraz I, under the regency of Vakhtang's nephew Heraclius I.

== Family ==
Vakhtang had three sons:

- Bagrat (born 16 July 1572); (Note: Genealogist Cyril Toumanoff considered Bagrat and Teimuraz to have been the same person. Historian Davit Ninidze, however, rejects this identification.)
- Teimuraz I (died 1625), Prince of Mukhrani (1605–1625);
- Kaikhosro (died 1629), Prince of Mukhrani (1625–1626).

== Notes ==
Preceded by Bagrat	Prince of Mukhrani; 1540–1580	Succeeded by Heraclius I
