= Juan de Bagration-Mukhrani =

Georgian prince

Prince Juan de Bagration-Mukhrani
- Born: Juan Jorge de Bagration-Mukhrani; 18 August 1977 (age 49); Madrid, Spain
- Spouse: Florianne del Rio Thorn (m. 2003; div. 2008) Kristine Dzidziguri (m. 2014)
- Issue: Prince Bagrat de Bagration-Mukhrani (b. 2021)
Names
- Juan Jorge de Bagration-Mukhrani
- House: Bagrationi
- Father: Bagrat de Bagration y de Baviera
- Mother: María del Carmen de Ulloa y Suelves

Prince Juan Bagration of Mukhrani (born 18 August 1977) is a Spanish-born Georgian prince and member of the Royal House Bagration (brandch of Mukhrani) of the Bagrationi dynasty and a relation to the Bavarian royal family and Spanish royal family.

== Early life and family ==
Prince Juan Jorge de Bagration-Mukhrani was born on 18 August 1977 in Madrid to Prince Bagrat de Bagration y de Baviera (1949-2017) and Doña María del Carmen de Ulloa y Suelves. His paternal grandfather, Prince Irakli Bagration of Mukhrani, was exiled from Georgia during the invasion of the Red Army, living in Germany, Italy, and finally settling in Spain. His paternal grandmother, Infanta María de las Mercedes of Spain was a member of the Spanish royal family and the German House of Wittelsbach; she was the daughter of Prince Ferdinand of Bavaria, granddaughter of Alfonso XII of Spain, and niece of Alfonso XIII of Spain. His maternal grandfather was Gonzalo Maria de Ulloa y Ramírez de Haro, Marqués de Castro-Serna, Count de Adanero. Prince Juan's parents divorced in 2005 and his father remarried in 2009 to Françoise Cazaudehore. Prince Juan is a member of the House of Mukhrani, a branch of the Bagrationi dynasty that ruled Georgia from the Middle Ages until the nineteenth century, when Georgia was annexed into the Russian Empire. The family was recognized as part of the Russian nobility until the rise of communism in Russia.

Prince Juan studied at Collège Alpin International Beau Soleil, a boarding school in Villars-sur-Ollon, Switzerland and was a schoolmate and childhood friend of Cayetano Rivera Ordóñez.

== Personal life ==
Prince Juan met Kristine Dzidziguri, a Georgian model, in 2014. They were married a few months later in a civil ceremony on 10 May 2014 in Ronda, Spain. The couple began planning a religious ceremony but were delayed due to social and political conflicts within Georgia and because of Prince Juan's father's declining health. His father died on 20 March 2017, and the couple decided to mourn for one year before organizing a religious wedding ceremony. On 2 June 2018, Prince Juan and Dzidziguri received a blessing from Ilia II of Georgia, the Catholicos-Patriarch of All Georgia. On 3 June 2018, they were married in a Georgian Orthodox ceremony at Svetitskhoveli Cathedral in Mtskheta. Their wedding reception was held at the Palace of Mukhrani.

After their wedding the couple honeymooned in Indonesia, where they attended the Tomohon International Flower Festival. While in Indonesia, they also made an official visit to the Agung Rai Museum of Art. Later during their Indonesian tour, Prince Juan and Princess Kristine attended a gala lunch focused on establishing a cultural relationship between Indonesia and Georgia.

Prince Juan is the founder of the Georgian Foundation, a non-profit organization that promotes Georgian culture. He has dual Spanish and Georgian citizenship. In October 2019 he launched a wine brand called Prince Ioane Bagrationi wines.
