= Teimuraz II, Prince of Mukhrani =

Teimuraz II

Prince of Mukhrani
- Reign: 1668–1688
- Predecessor: Constantine I
- Successor: Ashotan II
- Born: 1649
- Died: 1688 (aged 38–39)
- Spouse: Ana; Ketevan Orbelishvili
- Issue: Constantine II, Prince of Mukhrani; Otia; Adarnase; Bagrat
- House: Mukhrani
- Father: Constantine I, Prince of Mukhrani
- Mother: Darejan Abashidze
- Religion: Georgian Orthodox Church

Teimuraz II (Georgian: თეიმურაზ II მუხრანბატონი, romanized: teimuraz II mukhranbat'oni; 1649–1688) was the head of the Mukhrani branch of the royal Bagrationi dynasty of Kartli. He was Prince (batoni) of Mukhrani and ex officio commander of the Banner of Shida Kartli and Grand Master of the Household (sakhlt-ukhutsesi) at the court of Kartli from 1668 to 1688.

Teimuraz was a son of Constantine I, Prince of Mukhrani, and his wife Darejan, daughter of Prince Ghuana Abashidze.

== Family ==
Teimuraz was married twice: first to a certain Ana (fl. 1687) and second to Ketevan Orbelishvili (Orbeliani). He had four sons:

- Constantine II (died 1716), Prince of Mukhrani (1696–1700);
- Otia (died 1719), who had two sons:
  - Alexander (fl. 1717);
  - Otia (born 1718).
- Adarnase (fl. 1670–1701);
- Bagrat (fl. 1687–1703), who had one son:
  - Luarsab (born 1715).

== Reference ==
- (in Georgian) ბაგრატიონები - სამეცნიერო და კულტურული მემკვიდრეობა" - თბ. 2003 მუხრან-ბატონთა და ბაგრატიონ-მუხრანელთა გენეალოგია
- (in Georgian) მუხრანბატონთა გენეალოგიური ტაბულა (იური ჩიქოვანი, სოსო ბიჭიკაშვილი, დავით ნინიძე) - კრებული "არტანუჯი" N 5 - 1996 წ. - გვ.28-36

Preceded by Constantine I	Prince of Mukhrani; 1668–1688	Succeeded by Ashotan II
