= Mamuka, Prince of Mukhrani =

Mamuka

Prince of Mukhrani
- Reign: 1730–1735
- Predecessor: Interregnum
- Successor: Constantine III
- Died: 1751
- Spouse: Unnamed daughter of George VII of Imereti
- House: Mukhrani
- Father: Heraclius II, Prince of Mukhrani
- Religion: Georgian Orthodox Church

Mamuka (Georgian: მამუკა მუხრანბატონი, romanized: mamuk'a mukhranbat'oni; died 1751) was a Georgian prince and the head of the Mukhrani branch of the royal Bagrationi dynasty of Kartli. He was Prince (batoni) of Mukhrani and ex officio commander of the Banner of Shida Kartli from c. 1730 and 1735. Having taken part in a rebellion against Nader Shah's Persia, Mamuka had to take refuge in the Russian Empire, where he pursued a military career. He was known as Mehmed Bek to the Persians and as Mamuka Davydov (Russian: Мамука Давыдов) to the Russians.

== Biography ==
Mamuka was a son of Heraclius II, Prince of Mukhrani. He assumed the headship of the house of Mukhrani in 1730 or 1734, when the Kingdom of Kartli was in a state of turmoil and occupied by the Ottoman army. As the Persians began to gain an upper hand in eastern Caucasia, the Georgian nobility became divided on how to deal with the reemerging regional power. Mamuka joined the dignitaries such as Givi Amilakhvari (1689–1754), Shanshe II, Duke of Ksani, and Vakhushti Abashidze in opposition to the Persian hegemony, but he was taken prisoner and sent to fight in the Persian ranks against the Afghans in 1735. He managed to escape and fled to the Russian Empire, where he adopted the surname Davydov, a reference to his family's claim of Davidic descent. In 1738, Mamuka and his fellow Georgian exiles opted for joining the Russian service and formed a Georgian Hussar Company, which was later reorganized into a regiment. Mamuka was appointed the unit's first commander with the rank of a captain and rewarded with an estate in what is now Ukraine. He took part in the concluding phase of the 1735–39 war with the Ottoman Empire and retired in 1741. Mamuka was married to a daughter of King George VI of Imereti; no children of his are known.

Preceded by Interregnum	Prince of Mukhrani; 1730–1735	Succeeded by Constantine III
