= Teimuraz I, Prince of Mukhrani =

Teimuraz I

Prince of Mukhrani
- Reign: 1605–1625
- Predecessor: Heraclius I
- Successor: Kaikhosro
- Died: 1 July 1625
- Spouse: Ana of Aragvi
- Issue Among others: Vakhtang V; Constantine I, Prince of Mukhrani
- House: Mukhrani
- Father: Vakhtang I, Prince of Mukhrani
- Religion: Georgian Orthodox Church

Teimuraz I (Georgian: თეიმურაზ I მუხრანბატონი, romanized: teimuraz I mukhranbat'oni; died 1 July 1625) was a Georgian tavadi ("prince") of the House of Mukhrani, a collateral branch of the royal Bagrationi dynasty of Kartli, and Prince (Mukhranbatoni) of Mukhrani from 1605 until his death in 1625. At the same time, he was an ex officio commander of the Banner of Shida Kartli and regent of Kartli, from 1623 to 1625, during the rebellion against Safavid Iran. Teimuraz was killed at the battle of Marabda against the Iranian punitive army.

== Early life ==
Teimuraz was the second son of Vakhtang I, Prince of Mukhrani. His known brothers were Bagrat (born 16 July 1572) and Kaikhosro (died 1629). Genealogist Cyril Toumanoff identified Teimuraz and Bagrat as the same person, suggesting that Bagrat was the name adopted by the prince upon his accession to the lordship of Mukhrani. This identification was rejected by historian Davit Ninidze.

When his father died in 1580, the lordship of Mukhrani passed to the late prince's nephew and Teimuraz's cousin, Heraclius I (died 1605), apparently, in the capacity of a regent for the underage Prince Teimuraz. During this period of time, Kartli was a battleground between the rivaling Muslim empires, the Ottomans and the Safavids. In 1582, Mukhrani itself became the scene of a major confrontation in which King Simon I of Kartli inflicted defeat on the invading Ottoman army.

== War and death ==
In 1609, Teimuraz was in person present at the battle of Tashiskari, in which the Kartlians under Giorgi Saakadze annihilated an Ottoman-allied Crimean Tatar force, saving the young king Luarsab II. After the Safavid shah Abbas I militarily subjugated eastern Georgia in 1615, a succession of puppet Muslim rulers was installed to rule Kartli, but their authority was shaky in the areas other than the heavily Iranian-garrisoned capital, Tbilisi, and the districts of Lower Kartli. That vacuum of power was temporarily filled by the nobility of Kartli by appointing Teimuraz as regent in 1623. In 1625, Teimuraz joined an uprising against the Safavid hegemony led by Giorgi Saakadze. Shah Abbas dispatched a large punitive army which clashed with the united forces of Kartlians and Kakhetians at Marabda on 1 July 1625. According to the 18th-century chronicler Prince Vakhushti, Teimuraz was killed while gallantly fighting the enemy. A word spread out that the fallen Teimuraz was King Teimuraz I of Kakheti, turning the Georgians into flight and their initial success into a rout.

== Family ==
Teimuraz was married to Ana (fl. 1618), daughter of Nugzar, Duke of Aragvi. They had six children:

- Vakhtang V (died 1676), who served as the Prince of Mukhrani (1629–1658) and later ascended to become the King of Kartli (r. 1658–1676);
- Luarsab (fl. 1620–1629);
- Archil (fl. 1618–1637);
- David (fl. 1618–1631);
- Heraclius (fl. 1618–1676);
- Constantine I (died 1668), Prince of Mukhrani (1658–1668);
- Darejan.

| Preceded by Heraclius I | Prince of Mukhrani; 1605–1625 | Succeeded by Kaikhosro |
