= Ashotan I =

Ashotan I (Georgian: აშოთან I მუხრანბატონი, romanized: ashotan I mukhranbat'oni) (died 1561) was a Georgian tavadi ("prince") of the House of Mukhrani, a collateral branch of the royal Bagrationi dynasty, and a co-prince (batoni) of Mukhrani from 1539 to 1561.

== Biography ==
Ashotan was a son of Bagrat, Prince of Mukhrani, son of Constantine II of Georgia, by his wife Helen. After the resignation of Bagrat in 1539, Ashotan acceded as co-prince with his elder brother Vakhtang I. At the same time, he was commander of the Banner of Shida Kartli, one of the key provinces of the Kingdom of Kartli, a successor of the Kingdom of Georgia ruled by his royal cousins. Ashotan followed the tradition of the Georgian royals of patronizing the Iviron monastery on Mount Athos. A refectory at the Iviron commissioned by Ashotan housed the tomb of Catholicos Nicholas V of Georgia. During the Safavid invasion of Georgia in 1554, Ashotan joined his brothers, Vakhtang and Archil, in their refuge at the court of their sister, Dedisimedi, in Samtskhe. Back to his demesne, Ashotan successfully defended Mukhrani against the attack by the highlanders of Pkhovi in 1561, but he himself died in the battle.

The identity of Ashotan's wife is not known, but he had a daughter, Ketevan (c. 1560 – 13 September 1624), who was married to King David I of Kakheti. She was tortured to death at the order of Shah Abbas I of Persia for having refused to convert to Islam and was subsequently canonized as a saint by the Georgian Orthodox Church.

Preceded by Bagrat	Prince of Mukhrani; 1539–1561	Succeeded by Vakhtang I
