= Constantine III, Prince of Mukhrani =

Constantine III

Prince of Mukhrani
- Reign: 1735–1756
- Predecessor: Mamuka
- Successor: Simon
- Born: 1696
- Died: 26 October 1756 (aged 59–60)
- Spouse: Ketevan; Barbare of Aragvi
- Issue Among others: Ioane, Prince of Mukhrani
- House: Mukhrani
- Father: Constantine II, Prince of Mukhrani
- Mother: Nino Amilakhvari
- Religion: Georgian Orthodox Church

Constantine III (Georgian: კონსტანტინე III მუხრანბატონი, romanized: k'onst'ant'ine III mukhranbat'oni; 1696 – 26 October 1756) was a Georgian prince and the head of the Mukhrani branch of the royal Bagrationi dynasty of Kartli. He was Prince (batoni) of Mukhrani and ex officio commander of the Banner of Shida Kartli and Grand Master of the Household (msakhurt-ukhutsesi) at the court of Kartli from 1735 and 1756.

== Biography ==
Constantine was a son of Constantine II, Prince of Mukhrani and Princess Nino Amilakhvari. Constantine was a military commander under his suzerains, Georgian kings Teimuraz II and Heraclius II. He served as a governor (mouravi) of Tbilisi. As a measure against the marauding Lesgian raids, he fortified the fortresses of Ksani, Mchadijvari, and Shiosubani. In 1749, he took part in a successful military expedition undertaken by the Georgian kings to defend the Erivan Khanate from the Turkic Tarakama tribe. From 1754 to 1755, he was involved in the defense of Georgia's frontier from the Avar Khanate. He was killed in a clash with the Lesgians in 1756 and interred at the Cathedral of Mtskheta. Since his sons were still in their minority, Constantine's titles and properties passed on to his family member, Simon.

== Family ==
Constantine III was married twice: first to a certain Ketevan and second to Barbare (died 1790), daughter of Bardzim, Duke of Aragvi. Constantine's children were:

- Ketevan (1744–1808), who married Vakhtang, eldest son of Heraclius II of Georgia;
- Mariam;
- Tinatin (1753–1846);
- David (born 1755);
- Ioane (1755–1801), Prince of Mukhrani (1778–1801).

Preceded by Mamuka	Prince of Mukhrani; 1735–1756	Succeeded by Simon
