= Levan, Prince of Mukhrani =

Georgian prince

Levan

Prince of Mukhrani
- Reign: 1719–1721
- Predecessor: Heraclius II
- Successor: Jesse
- Died: 14 May 1739
- Spouse: Helen
- Issue Among others: Simon, Prince of Mukhrani
- House: Mukhrani
- Father: Papua, Prince of Mukhrani
- Mother: Tamar Abashidze
- Religion: Georgian Orthodox Church

Levan Mukhranbatoni (Georgian: ლევან მუხრანბატონი; died 14 May 1739) was a Georgian nobleman of the House of Mukhrani, a collateral branch of the royal Bagrationi dynasty of Kartli. He was Prince (batoni) of Mukhrani and ex officio commander of the Banner of Shida Kartli and Grand Master of the Household (msakhurt-ukhutsesi) at the court of Kartli from 1719 to 1721.

== Biography ==
Levan was the only son of Papua, Prince of Mukhrani, and Princess Tamar Abashidze. He was enfeoffed of Mukhrani in 1719 on the deposition of his uncle, Prince Heraclius II, by King Bakar. Levan was, in turn, deposed in 1721, when King Vakhtang VI granted Mukhrani to his reconciled brother, Jesse. Levan went into exile to the Russian Empire, but returned in 1728.

== Family ==
Levan was married to a certain Helen. Their children were:

- Levan (born 1719);
- Papua (1719–1740);
- Simon (1726–1785), Prince of Mukhrani (1756–1778);
- Ioane (fl. 1727–1793);
- Mamuka;
- Ilia (born 1728);
- Edisher (born 1734);
- Kristepore (fl. 1727–1736), Archbishop of Tsilkani;
- George (fl. 1757–1788).

Preceded by Heraclius II	Prince of Mukhrani; 1719–1721	Succeeded by Jesse
