= Archil, Prince of Mukhrani =

Archil Mukhranbatoni (Georgian: არჩილ მუხრანბატონი; died 25 November 1582) was a Georgian nobleman of the House of Mukhrani, a collateral branch of the royal Bagrationi dynasty.

== Biography ==
Archil was a son of Bagrat I, Prince of Mukhrani, son of Constantine II of Georgia, by his wife Helen. After Bagrat's resignation, Archil's elder brothers, Ashotan and Vakhtang, succeeded as princes of Mukhrani. Archil was actively involved in contemporary war and politics.

During the Safavid invasion of Georgia in 1554, Archil joined his brothers in their exile at the court of their sister, Dedisimedi, in Samtskhe-Saatabago. Back to Kartli, Archil was allied with his cousin, King Simon I of Kartli, and perpetually challenged the Safavid control of Tbilisi, the capital of Kingdom of Kartli, frequently raiding the city's environs. In one of such forays, a Safavid force from the Tbilisi citadel assaulted and defeated Archil at Sapurtsle. The prince and his family were captured and sent to Iran. After Simon I himself was brought captive to the Shah Tahmasp I and cast in the Alamut fortress, Archil and his family were imprisoned in Shiraz in 1573. Both Simon and Archil were released on the death of Tahmasp and returned to Kartli in 1576. Archil once again visited his sister in Samtskhe and died in that principality, at Atskuri, on 25 November 1582.

== Family ==
Archil had three children:

- Heraclius I (29 March 1560 – 1605), Prince of Mukhrani (1580–1605);
- Helen (fl. 1572);
- Husein Beg.
