= Papua, Prince of Mukhrani =

Papua

Prince of Mukhrani
- Reign: 1692–1696
- Predecessor: Ashotan II
- Successor: Constantine II
- Born: 1651
- Died: February 1717 (aged 65–66)
- Spouse: Tamar Abashidze
- Issue: Levan, Prince of Mukhrani
- House: Mukhrani
- Father: Constantine I, Prince of Mukhrani
- Mother: Darejan Abashidze
- Religion: Georgian Orthodox Church

Papua (Georgian: პაპუა მუხრანბატონი, romanized: p'ap'ua mukhranbat'oni; 1651 – February 1717) was a Georgian tavadi ("prince") of the House of Mukhrani, a branch of the royal Bagrationi dynasty of Kartli. He was Prince (Mukhranbatoni) of Mukhrani and ex officio commander of the Banner of Shida Kartli from 1692 to 1696 and Grand Master of the Household (msakhurt-ukhutsesi) at the court of Kartli in 1692.

== Biography ==
Papua was a son of Constantine I, Prince of Mukhrani by his wife Darejan Abashidze and served loyally to his relative, King George XI, whose troops he commanded—together with Giorgi, Duke of Aragvi—in a confrontation with the army of King Heraclius I in Ertso-Tianeti in 1694. Prince Papua suffered a defeat, but the appearance of George XI in person at Tianeti resulted in an agreement with Heraclius to restore status quo ante bellum for the time being. In 1696, Heraclius employed the Iranian forces under Kalb Ali Khan, a Safavid governor of Kakheti, and forced George XI into exile to Imereti. The leading noblemen of Kartli, such as Papua and Tamaz Orbeliani, surrendered and were sent by the Iranian government for imprisonment at Kerman. After George XI was restored to the throne in 1703, Prince Papua and other Georgian notables were released from captivity.

== Family ==
Papua was married to Tamar (died 1704), daughter of Prince Levan Abashidze. They had a son:

- Levan (died 1739), Prince of Mukhrani (1719–1721);

Preceded by Ashotan II	Prince of Mukhrani; 1692–1696	Succeeded by Constantine II
