= Heraclius I, Prince of Mukhrani =

Heraclius I

Prince of Mukhrani
- Reign: 1580–1605
- Predecessor: Vakhtang I
- Successor: Teimuraz I
- Born: 29 March 1560
- Died: 1605 (aged 44–45)
- Spouse: Tamar
- House: Mukhrani
- Father: Archil, Prince of Mukhrani
- Religion: Georgian Orthodox Church

Heraclius I (Georgian: ერეკლე I მუხრანაბატონი, romanized: erek'le I mukhranabat'oni; 29 March 1560 – 1605) was a Georgian nobleman of the House of Mukhrani, a collateral branch of the royal Bagrationi dynasty, and Prince or co-Prince (batoni) of Mukhrani from 1580 to 1605. Heraclius was married to a certain Tamar, with no known issue.

== Biography ==
Heraclius was a son of Archil, a grandson of King Constantine II of Georgia. Traditional genealogies such as that by Cyril Toumanoff omit Heraclius' tenure as Prince of Mukhrani, instead placing a continuous rule of his cousin, Teimuraz I from 1580 to 1625. During Archil's captivity in Iran, Heraclius lived with his cousins from the ruling Jaqeli family in the Samtskhe-Saatabago and fought on their side against the Shalikashvili-led aristocratic revolt in Samtskhe from 1576 to 1578. In May 1578, Heraclius returned to the Kingdom of Kartli and provided support to Queen Nestan-Darejan, a consort of his exiled cousin, King Simon I of Kartli, who stayed at Surami. Soon, as the Ottoman army under Lala Mustafa Pasha marched into the Georgian lands in August 1578, Heraclius found himself in the heat of another war as an energetic and locally successful commander.

| Preceded by Vakhtang I | Prince of Mukhrani; 1580–1605 | Succeeded by Teimuraz I |
