= Konstantine Bagration of Mukhrani =

Konstantine Bagration of Mukhrani may refer to:

- Konstantine Bagration of Mukhrani (1838–1903), Georgian nobleman
- Konstantine Bagration of Mukhrani (1889–1915), Georgian nobleman
