= Ivane Bagration of Mukhrani =

Prince Ivane Bagration of Mukhrani
- Native name: ივანე კონსტანტინეს ძე მუხრანბატონი
- Born: 7 February 1812
- Died: 11 March 1895 (aged 83)
- Noble family: House of Mukhrani
- Father: Constantine IV
- Military career
- Education: Page Corps
- Allegiance: Russian Empire
- Rank: Lieutenant general
- Commands: Erivan 13th Grenadier Regiment, Caucasus Grenadier Division, 18th Infantry Division
- Conflicts: Caucasian War, Crimean War
- Awards: Order of St. Vladimir 4th degree with a ribbon (1838); Order of St. Anne 3rd degree with a ribbon (1839); Golden Weapon for Bravery (1844); Order of St. Anne 2nd degree (1846); Order of St. Anne 2nd degree with an Imperial Crown (1849); Order of St. George 4th degree for 25 years of service (1851); Order of St. Vladimir 3rd degree (1852); Order of St. George 3rd degree (1854); Order of St. Stanislaus 1st degree. (1854); Insignia for XXV years of immaculate service (1858); Order of St. Anne 1st degree with swords (1860); Order of St. Vladimir 2nd degree (1864); Order of the White Eagle (1875)

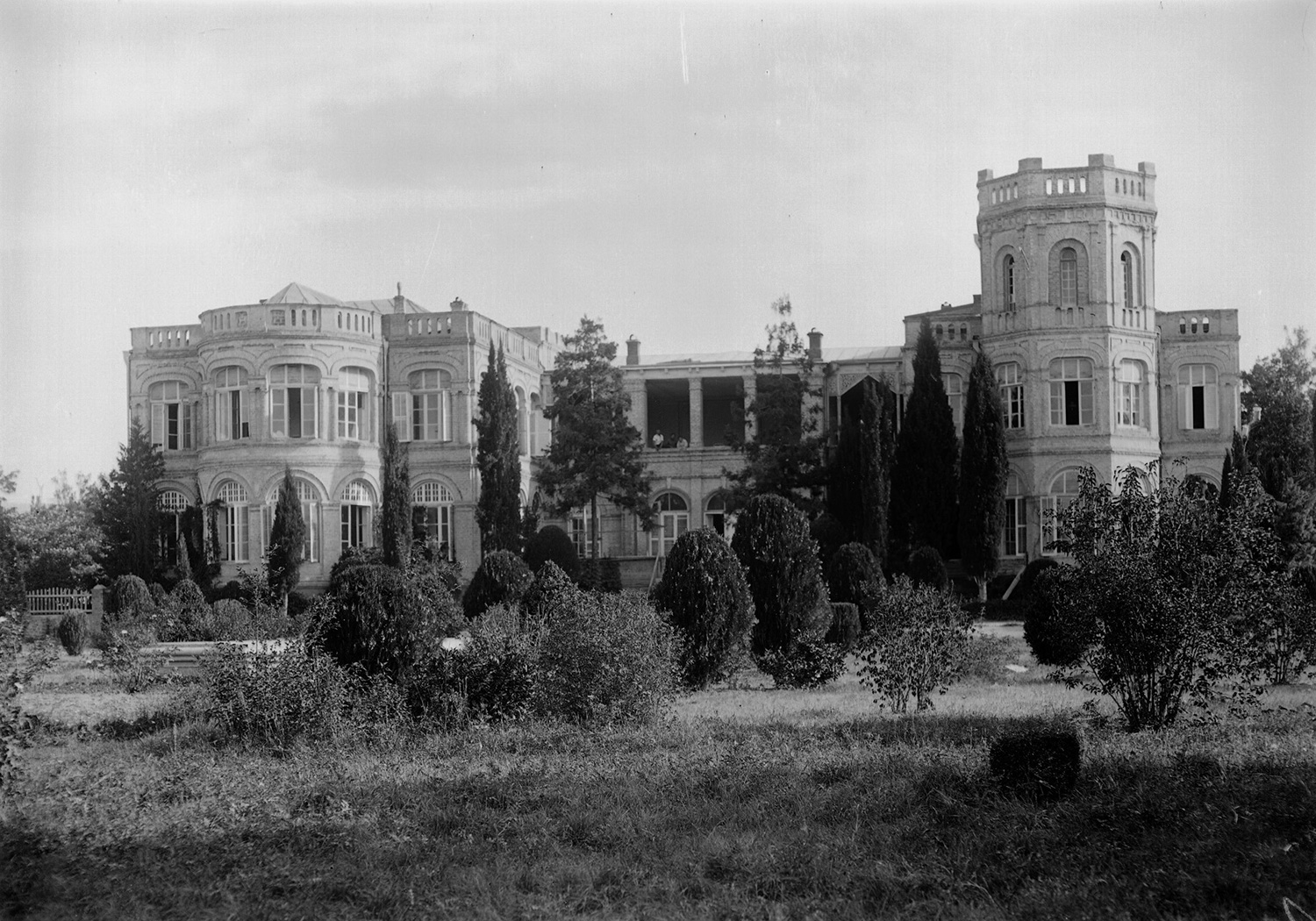
Palace of Mukhrani built by Prince Ivane

Ivane Bagration of Mukhrani (Georgian: ივანე მუხრანბატონი, Ivane Mukhranbatoni; Russian: Иван Константинович Багратион-Мухранский, Ivan Konstantinovich Bagration-Mukhransky) (February 7, 1812 – March 11, 1895) was a Georgian nobleman of the House of Mukhrani, and general in the Imperial Russian service. He was one of the biggest Georgian landowners of that time and a modernizer of winemaking industry.

== Biography ==
Born into a prominent aristocratic family of Constantine IV, Prince of Mukhrani and Princess Khoreshan née Guramishvili, Ivan Bagration was educated at St. Petersburg Page Corps and enlisted in the Nizhny Novgorod Dragoon Regiment in 1830. He participated in several expeditions against the rebellious mountaineers during the Caucasus War. In 1848, he was promoted to colonel and appointed commander of the Erivan Grenadier Regiment of the Russian Imperial Army located in Manglisi, Tiflis region. He became major-general in 1851 and scored his most notable achievements during the Crimean War (1853–1856), when Bagration, being in command of the Caucasian Reserve Grenadier Brigade, played a decisive role in the defeat of the Ottoman army at Basgedikler (near Kars) on November 19, 1853. For the rest of the war, he served as a governor-general of Kutaisi and defended its approaches from the invading Ottoman troops. Promoted to lieutenant-general, he was put in charge of the 18th Infantry Division in 1858.

Prince Bagration of Mukhrani married, in 1836, Princess Nino (1816–1886), daughter of Levan V Dadiani, Prince of Mingrelia, by whom he had the only son, Constantine.

== Later life and winemaking ==
Prince Bagration of Mukhrani resigned from military service in 1881 and was elected a Marshal of the Nobility of Tiflis Governorate from 1885 to 1891. He owned some 25,000 dessiatin of lands and took a big interest in winemaking. He employed French and Georgian specialists to construct, in 1876, a large winery in his familial estate of Mukhrani which exploited a French technology of bottling to produce Georgian sparkling wines. This brand, a winner of a Grand Prix at the 1882 St. Petersburg wine exhibition, is still produced by JSC "Bagrationi-1882", one of Georgia's largest wine-producing enterprises. In Paris (1889) wine exhibition - "Exposition Universalle Internationale de 1889", Mukhranian sparkling wine got gold medal. In 2001, a business group founded the Chateau Mukhrani Company which intends to revive the estate to its former glory and re-establish production at Mukhrani, combining modern and traditional technologies, following in the footsteps of Prince Ivane Mukhranbatoni.

Preceded by Constantine IV of Mukhrani	Head of the House of Mukhrani; 1842—1895	Succeeded by Constantine Bagration of Mukhrani
