= Ida Bagus Made =

Indonesian artist

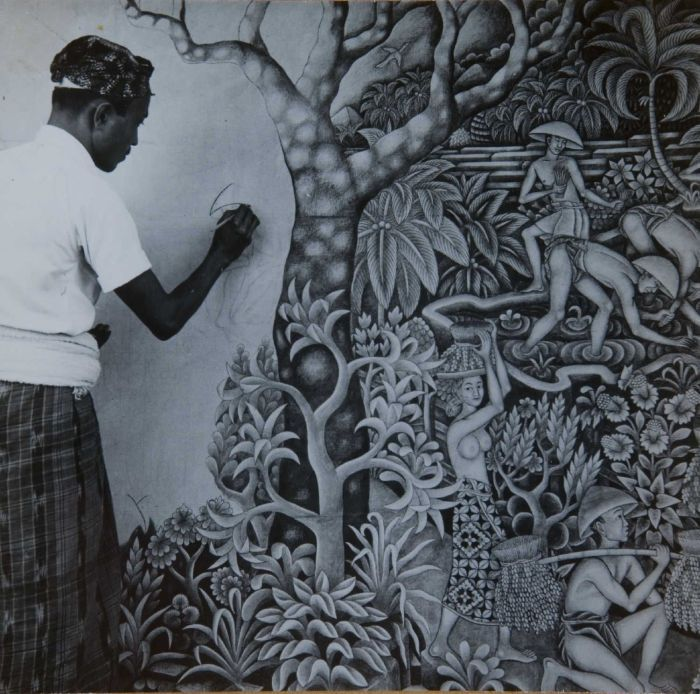
- Born: 1915; Ubud, Bali, Indonesia
- Died: 1999 (aged 83–84); Ubud, Bali, Indonesia
- Known for: Painter

Ida Bagus Made Poleng (1915–1999) was a traditional Balinese painter. Known also as Ida Bagus Made Poleng or Ida Bagus Made Tebesaya or simply Gus Made.

== Biography ==
He was born in Tebasaya, Ubud, Bali in 1915. Ida Bagus Made came from a Brahman family of accomplished artists in Tampaksiring, Bali. His Father, Ida Bagus kembeng (1897–1952), was a well-known painter who won the prestigious Silver Medal in 1937 at the International Colonial Art Exposition in Paris. Ida Bagus Made first learned painting and carving from his father. He later studied painting under the guidance of Rudolf Bonnet. Bonnet once wrote that Ida Bagus Made was one of the most talented artist in Bali. He was in his teens when the modernization of Balinese art began in the late 1920s, and only 21 years old when he joined the prestigious Pitamaha Artist Guild, founded in 1936 to preserve Balinese art from the threat of tourism and commercialism.

His father, Ida Bagus Kembeng had two wives: Jero Deblog and Ida Ayu Rai. Ida Bagus Made was a child from his second wife. From his marriage with Jero Deblog, Ida Bagus Kembeng had two sons: Ida Bagus Putu Wiri and Ida Bagus Made Belawa. With Ida Ayu Rai, Kembeng had a daughter, Ida Ayu Oka, and two sons: Ida Bagus Made Poleng and Ida Bagus Nyoman Raka.

Ida Bagus Made was married to Gusti Niang and had one daughter, Ida Ayu Sadri. Since Ida Bagus Made did not have a son, he adopted Ida Bagus Pudja, a son of his half brother, Ida Bagus Belawa.

He was known by the Balinese as a ritual specialist for carving sacred masks imbued with magical powers for the surrounding temples of Ubud. As a traditional painter of the Pitamaha generation, he became known worldwide for his artistic mastery.

Ida Bagus Made was a prolific painter who had a profound distrust of art dealers and collectors. He scrutinized his admirers and only a handful of collectors passed his test. The late Indonesian President Sukarno was one of such collectors that Ida Bagus Made revered. His works are well sought after and are in the collection of many museums in the world.

He died after an illness in 1999. In 2000, following the artist’s last wish, the widow of Ida Bagus Made loaned over 100 paintings from the artist’s private collection to the Puri Lukisan Museum for safekeeping.

== Works ==
Ida Bagus Made's paintings are some of the best examples of the Ubud school from the Pitamaha generation, and have not been surpassed by younger painters. His paintings have been acquired by prestigious institutions all over the world, including the United Nations, the Royal Tropical Institute Museum (Amsterdam) and the Royal Ethnographic Museum (Leiden). In Indonesia, his paintings are in the collections of former President Sukarno, the Museum Puri Lukisan, the Neka Museum, the Agung Rai Museum of Art, the Bentara Budaya Museum, and many others.

Several most important work from Ida Bagus Made are : (1) Atomic War in Indra's Heaven (Ida Bagus Made' estate in Museum Puri Lukisan). (2) Dancing Leyak (Ida Bagus Made' Estate). (3)Three Women Shape-Shifters (Ida Bagus Made's Estate).

== Exhibitions ==
Before the Second World War, his paintings were included in many touring exhibitions organized by the Pitamaha Artist Guild. Exhibitions were held in the Kunst-ring (Art Circle) of Batavia (1936, 1937, 1939); Bandung (1936, 1938); Tegal (1938); Medan, Palembang and Surabaya (1939).

After 1945, he stopped participating in any exhibitions. Not until 1998 that he gave a blessing to a solo exhibition organized by Darga Gallery (Sanur, Ubud). The exhibition (14 March - 14 April 1998) featured paintings from the Neka Museum, The Agung Rai Museum of Art and of a handful private collectors. Ida Bagus Made attended the opening of the exhibition. A short catalog, entitled Ida Bagus Made - Mata Air Campuhan Masa Silam, accompanied the exhibition.

In 2001, a posthumous solo exhibition was held at the Herbert Johnson Museum of the Cornell University, Ithaca, New York. The exhibition was curated by Prof. Kaja McGowan of Cornell University. Third teen paintings from three private collectors were shown from August 18 - October 28, 2001. An exhibition leaflet: Suaranya Gong Kebyar: the Balinese Art of Ida Bagus Made was published.

In July 2008, a posthumous solo exhibition was held in Museum Puri Lukisan in Bali. This exhibition features paintings from the estate of maestro Ida Bagus Made Poleng and celebrates the visual artistry of one of the foremost painters of Ubud. Fifty paintings from the estate of the artist was presented to the public for the first time. It is accompanied by a catalog: “Ida Bagus Made – the Art of Devotion”
