= Constantine II =

Constantine II may refer to:

- Constantine II (emperor) (317–340), Roman Emperor 337–340
- Constantine III (usurper) (died 411), known as Constantine II of Britain in British legend
- Patriarch Constantine II of Constantinople, Patriarch of Constantinople from 754 to 766
- Antipope Constantine II (died 768), antipope from 767 to 768
- Constantine II of Scotland (c.878 – 952), King of Scotland 900–942 or 943
- Constantine II, Prince of Armenia (died 1129)
- Constantine II of Cagliari (c. 1100 – 1163)
- Constantine II of Torres (died 1198), called de Martis, was the giudice of Logudoro
- Constantine II the Woolmaker (died 1322), Catholicos of the Armenian Apostolic Church
- Constantine II, King of Armenia (died 1344), first Latin King of Armenian Cilicia of the Lusignan dynasty
- Constantine II of Bulgaria (early 1370s–1422), last emperor of Bulgaria 1396–1422.
- Eskender (1471–1494), Emperor of Ethiopia sometimes known as Constantine II
- Constantine II of Georgia (c. 1447 – 1505)
- Constantine II, Prince of Mukhrani (died 1716), Georgian nobleman
- Constantine II of Kakheti (died 1732), King of Kakheti 1722–1732
- Constantine II of Greece (1940–2023), Olympic champion (1960) and formerly King of the Hellenes March 6, 1964 – June 1, 1973

== See also ==
- Constantius II (317–361), Roman Emperor from 337 to 361
- Constans II (630–668), Byzantine emperor from 641 to 668
