= Constantine II, Prince of Mukhrani =

Constantine II

Prince of Mukhrani
- Reign: 1696–1700
- Predecessor: Papua
- Successor: Jesse
- Died: 1716
- Spouse: Nino Amilakhvari
- Issue: Constantine III, Prince of Mukhrani
- House: Mukhrani
- Father: Teimuraz II, Prince of Mukhrani
- Religion: Georgian Orthodox Church

Constantine II (Georgian: კონსტანტინე II მუხრანბატონი, romanized: k'onst'ant'ine II mukhranbat'oni; died 1716) was a Georgian nobleman of the House of Mukhrani, a collateral branch of the royal Bagrationi dynasty of Kartli. He was Prince (batoni) of Mukhrani and ex officio commander of the Banner of Shida Kartli and Grand Master of the Household (sakhlt-ukhutsesi) at the court of Kartli from 1696 to 1700.

Constantine was a son of Prince Teimuraz II of Mukhrani. He succeeded to the lordship of Mukhrani and court titles on the deposition of his uncle, Papua, who was punished by the pro-Iranian king Heraclius I for his loyalty to the rebellious George XI.

== Family ==
Constantine II was married to Nino, daughter of Prince David Amilakhvari. They had one son:

- Constantine III (1716–1756), Prince of Mukhrani (1735–1756).

| Preceded by Papua | Prince of Mukhrani; 1696–1700 | Succeeded by Jesse |
