= Constantine I, Prince of Mukhrani =

Constantine I

Prince of Mukhrani
- Reign: 1658–1668
- Predecessor: Vakhtang II
- Successor: Teimuraz II
- Died: 1668
- Burial: Svetitskhoveli Cathedral
- Spouse: Darejan Abashidze
- Issue Among others: Teimuraz II; Papuna; Heraclius II; Tamar
- House: Mukhrani
- Father: Teimuraz I, Prince of Mukhrani
- Mother: Ana Sidamoni
- Religion: Georgian Orthodox Church

Constantine I (Georgian: კონსტანტინე I მუხრანბატონი, romanized: k'onst'ant'ine I mukhranbat'oni; died 1668) was a Georgian prince and the head of the Mukhrani branch of the royal Bagrationi dynasty of Kartli. He was Prince (Mukhranbatoni) of Mukhrani and ex officio commander of the Banner of Shida Kartli from 1658 to 1668.

== Biography ==
Constantine I was the son of Teimuraz I, Prince of Mukhrani, by his wife Ana, daughter of Nugzar, Duke of Aragvi. He was born between 1618 and 1622. In 1658, Constantine succeeded as Prince of Mukhrani his elder brother Vakhtang, who became King of Kartli on the death of his adopted father, Rostom, the last in the main male line of the Bagrationi of Kartli. On this occasion, Vakhtang, as a vassal of Safavid Persia, converted to Islam, but Constantine remained Christian. He is buried at the Cathedral of Mtskheta.

== Family ==
Constantine married Darejan (died 1667), daughter of Prince Ghuana Abashidze, and had the following children:

- Teimuraz II (1649–1688), Prince of Mukhrani (1668–1688);
- Papua (1651–1717), Prince of Mukhrani (1692–1696);
- Kristepore (died 1700), Archbishop;
- David (Datuna) (died 1728), he had one daughter, Darejan;
- Heraclius II (1666–1723), Prince of Mukhrani (1717–1719);
- Tatia, who married Bagrat IV of Imereti; he later divorced her in order to marry her sister Tamar;
- Tamar (died 1683), who first married Levan III Dadiani, Prince of Mingrelia, from whom she was divorced by King Bagrat IV of Imereti, who subsequently married her. Her third husband was her son-in-law, George III Gurieli, Prince of Guria, who had long been passionately in love with her.

Preceded by Vakhtang II	Prince of Mukhrani; 1658–1668	Succeeded by Teimuraz II
