= Heraclius II =

Heraclius II can refer to:

- Heraklonas (626–641), Byzantine co-emperor with Heraclius Constantine 3 May 612 - 25 May 641
- Heraclius II of Georgia (1720–1798), king of Kakheti 1744–1762, of Kartli and Kakheti 1762–1798
- Heraclius II, Prince of Mukhrani (1666–1723), Georgian nobleman
