= Battle of Aghaiani =

1625 battle

| Date | Early spring of 1625 |
| Location | Near Aghaiani 41°54′45″N 44°32′45″E |
| Result | Safavid victory |

Belligerents
| Kingdom of Kakheti | Safavid Iran |

Commanders and leaders
| Unknown | Qarachaqay Khan |

Strength
| Small | Large |

Casualties and losses
| 400 | Unknown |

The Battle of Aghaiani (Georgian: აღაიანის ბრძოლა; Persian: نبرد آقایانی) was a battle fought in 1625 between the armies of Safavid Iran and the Kingdom of Kakheti.

In early spring, Shah Abbas I sent a large Iranian army to Georgia under the command of Qarachaqay Khan, which encamped near the village of Aghaiani. The Iranian objective was to destroy the Kakhetians and deport the population of Kartli to Iran. Qarachaqay Khan summoned a select group of Kakhetian nobles and retainers under the pretext that they would receive gifts from the Shah. The Kakhetians were brought into the tents, where they were beheaded. After approximately 400 men had been killed, the treachery was discovered, and the Kakhetians fought their way back toward Kakheti. Following the battle, Kartli and Kakheti began preparations for an uprising against Iran.

== See also ==
- Battle of Martkopi
