= Aghaiani church of Saint Nino =

Georgian Orthodox medieval church in Aghaiani, Shida Kartli, Georgia

- აღაიანის ნინოწმინდის ეკლესია
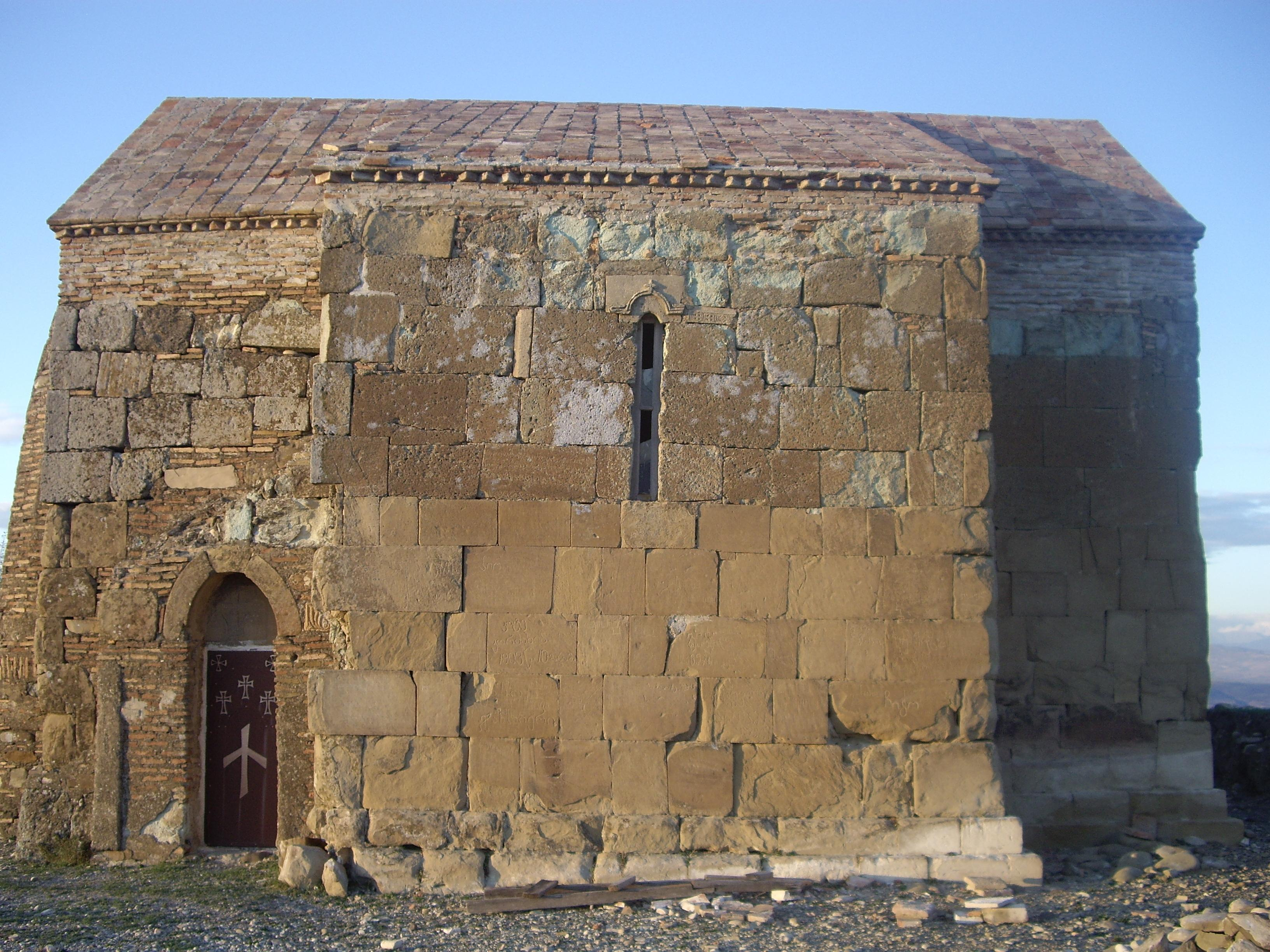
- Aghaiani church of Saint Nino.
- Interactive map of Aghaiani church of Saint Nino
- Location: Aghaiani, Kaspi Municipality; Shida Kartli, Georgia
- Coordinates: 41.942409°N 44.457348°E
- Type: Hall church

Aghaiani church of Saint Nino (Georgian: აღაიანის ნინოწმინდის ეკლესია, romanized: aghaianis ninots'mindis ek'lesia) is an early medieval Georgian Orthodox church on Mount Tkhoti, 2 km southeast of the village of Aghaiani in the Kaspi Municipality in Georgia's Shida Kartli region. It stands at the place of one of the three wooden crosses erected—according to historical tradition—at the behest of Saint Nino to mark adoption of Christianity by the people of Kartli. The extant structure is a hall church, a 9th–10th-century remodeling of an earlier cross-in-square building. The church is inscribed on the list of Georgia's Immovable Cultural Monuments of National Significance.

== Location ==
The Aghaiani church tops Mount Tkhoti, 845 m high, on the left bank of the Mtkvari (Kura). According to the medieval Georgian historical tradition, it was on this mount that the sudden darkness engulfed Mirian, a pagan king of Kartli, and the light did not resume until the king invoked "the god of Nino", a female preacher of Christianity. After Mirian's conversion—traditionally dated to 337—Nino had three wooden crosses erected in Kartli, one of them at Tkhoti, two others at Ujarma and Mtskheta, respectively. Later, a church was built in this place.

== Layout ==
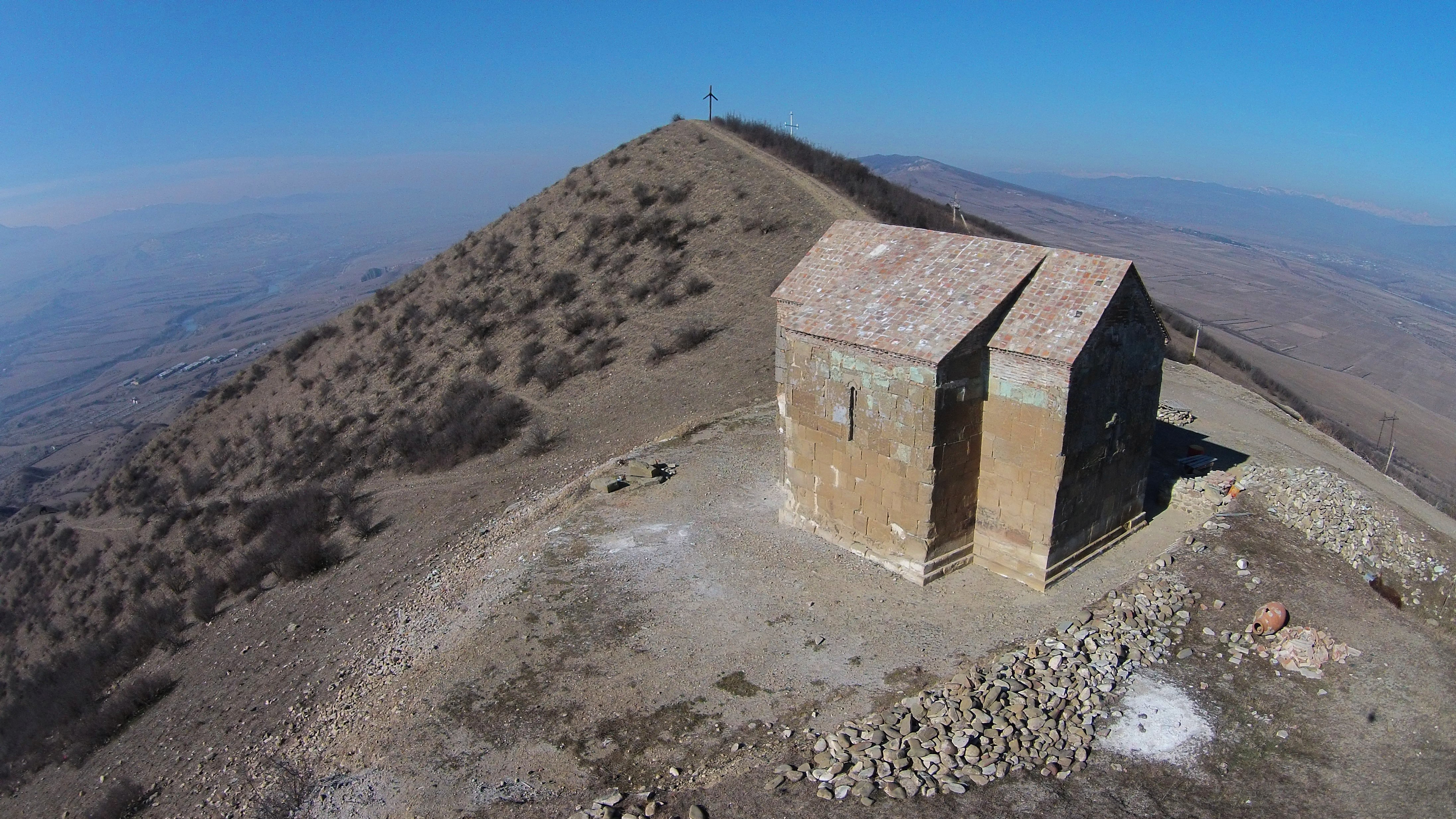
Church of St. Nino on Mt. Tkhoti.

The extant edifice, built of stone and brick, measures 8.48 × 4.18 m. It was originally a cross-in-square structure built in the 7th or 8th century. In the 9th or 10th century, the church was remodeled into a hall church: its cross-like appearance was retained as were a semi-circular apse and the western arm, but the dome was replaced with a barrel vault rested on five arches and the northern and southern arms were built up. The entrances are on the north and west. The interior is lit with two windows, one in the apse and the other in the southern wall. The central bay is covered with a gable, while the northern and southern projections have pent roofs. An arched buttress was annexed to the southern façade in the 16th century. The church was repaired in 2007.

The sanctuary walls bear surviving fragments of frescoes and inscriptions. The paintings are stylistically dated to the end of the 10th or the beginning of the 11th century. On the eastern façade, a keystone of window arch bears three sculpted crosses. The southern façade boasts an inscription in the medieval Georgian asomtavruli script, arranged in three lines.
