= Dmitry Bagration =

Russian general and military writer (1863–1919)

Prince Dmitry Petrovich Bagration
- Князь Дмитрий Петрович Багратион
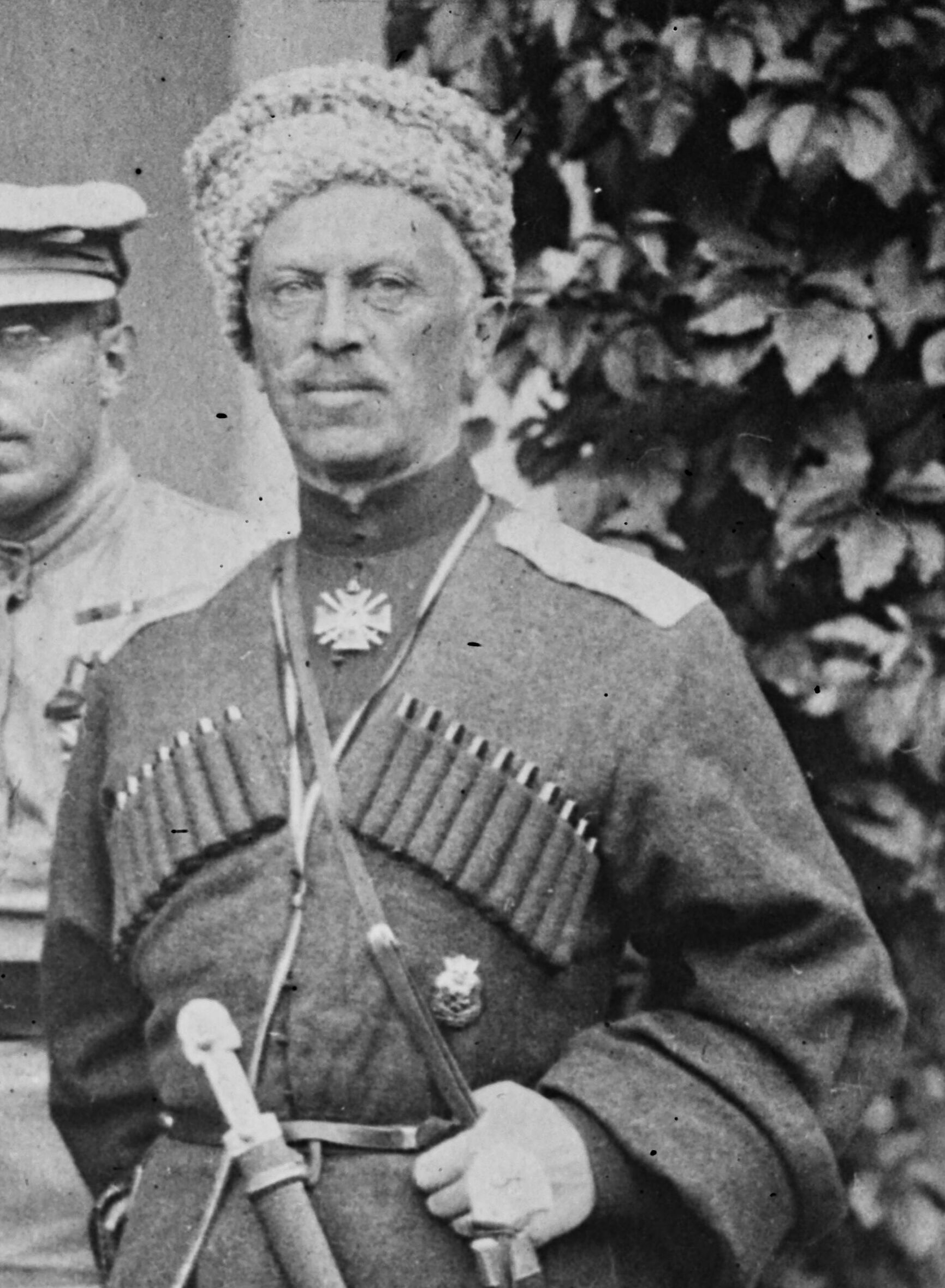
- In 1917
- Born: 13 June 1863
- Died: 21 October 1919 (aged 56)
- Military career
- Allegiance: Russian Empire; Russian Republic; Russian Soviet Federative Socialist Republic
- Unit: Savage Division
- Conflicts: World War I; Russian Civil War

Dmitry Petrovich Bagration (Russian: Дми́трий Петро́вич Багратио́н; 13 June 1863 – 21 October 1919) was a Russian general and military writer. A scion of the Georgian royal family, he served under the Imperial, Provisional, and Soviet governments.

== Biography ==
Prince Dmitry Bagration was born in the family of Prince Pyotr Bagration and Yelizaveta Rodzianko. He was a great-grandson of General Prince Kiril Bagration, himself a grandson of the Georgian monarch Jesse of Kartli of the Mukhrani branch of the Bagrationi. Dmitry Bagration was educated as a cavalry officer and also wrote for the military press. During World War I, he was appointed commander of the 1st Brigade of the Savage Division in 1914. He was twice an acting commander of the division and became a lieutenant-general in 1916. After the fall of the Russian monarchy in the February Revolution, Bagration played a role in the Kornilov affair in August 1917, in which he stepped back from supporting General Aleksandr Krymov's planned march against the Russian Provisional Government in Petrograd. Soon, Bagration was dismissed from field command to the army reserve. Under the Soviet administration, he joined the Red Army in December 1918. In 1919, he directed the High Cavalry School and took part in organizing cavalry units of the Red Army. He died the same year and was buried at the Alexander Nevsky Lavra.

Dmitry Bagration was married to Vera Zakharina (1883–1947), with one daughter, Princess Nina Bagration (d. 1927). His brother, Alexander (1862–1920), who had retired from army service as major-general in 1916, was executed by the Soviet government while being on a vacation. With the death of the Bagration brothers, the senior, royal line of the Bagrationi of Mukhrani became extinct in male line.
