= Bagrat, Prince of Mukhrani =

Georgian prince

Bagrat

Prince of Mukhrani
- Reign: 1512–1540
- Predecessor: Established
- Successor: Vakhtang I
- Died: 1540
- Spouse: Helen
- Issue Among others: Vakhtang I; Archil; Ashotan I; Dedisimedi
- House: Mukhrani
- Father: Constantine II of Georgia
- Mother: Tamar
- Religion: Georgian Orthodox Church
- Khelrtva

Bagrat, Prince of Mukhrani (Georgian: ბაგრატ მუხრანბატონი, romanized: bagrat' mukhranbat'oni; died 1540) was the third son of King Constantine II of Georgia, of the Bagrationi dynasty, and the founder of the House of Mukhrani.

== Biography ==
Constantine II, king of Georgia now reduced to that of Kartli, made all of his sons, Bagrat among them, his co-kings, as is indicated by the position of the royal style after his name in the royal acts. Unlike his two elder brothers, however, David X and George IX, Bagrat never came to the throne of Kartli. Bagrat received in appanage the princedom of Mukhrani and the title of High Constable of Upper Kartli in reward for his vital assistance to his brother David X against the aggression from George II, a neighboring Georgian Bagratid ruler of Kakheti, in 1512. Bagrat withheld a Kakhetian siege of his fortress on the river Ksani and forced George II to withdraw. In 1513, he captured George in an ambush and put in prison where the king died, leaving Kakheti vulnerable to Bagrat's raids.

In 1540 (or 1539), Bagrat resigned and took holy orders under the name of Barnaba. He authored a polemical work A Story of Religion of Ismaelite Infidels (მოთხრობაჲ სჯულთა უღმერთოთა ისმაილიტთაჲ), a Christian apology critical of Islam.

== Family ==
Bagrat was married to a certain Helen. Their children were:

- Vakhtang I (c. 1510–1580), who succeeded his father as Prince of Mukhrani (1540–1580);
- Heraclius, who married Helen, daughter of Levan of Kakheti;
- Archil (died 1582), who fought Safavid forces in Tbilisi until he was captured and imprisoned in Shiraz, and was eventually released to return to Kartli;
- Ashotan I (died 1561), who successfully defended Mukhrani against a raid by highlanders from Pkhovi in 1561 but was killed in the battle. He was the father of Ketevan the Martyr;
- Alexander (died 1604);
- Dedisimedi (fl. 1545–1587), who married Kaikhosro II Jaqeli, Atabeg of Samtskhe;
- Ioanatan;
- Guldapar;
- Iotam;
- Theodora.

Preceded by Title created	Prince of Mukhrani; 1512–1540	Succeeded by Vakhtang I
