= Aghaiani =

Aghaiani აღაიანი
- Location of Aghayani in Georgia
- Coordinates: 41°54′45″N 44°32′45″E
- Country: Georgia
- Region: Shida Kartli
- Municipality: Kaspi
- Elevation: 540 m (1,770 ft)

Population (2014)
  - Total: 1,505
- Time zone: UTC+4 (Georgian Time)

Aghaiani or Aghayani (Georgian: აღაიანი) is a village in Kaspi District, Shida Kartli, Georgia. It is located on Mukhrani plain, on the right bank of the river Ksani, at an altitude of 540 meters. It is 22 kilometers from Kaspi and lies just south of the de facto border of South Ossetia.

The historical sources first mention the village in 1459. In 1625 near the village a battle took place between Kakhetians and Persians. In the surroundings of the village archaeologists discovered the remnants of settlements from the Bronze and Antic periods. 2 kilometers southeast of the village, on Mt. Tkhoti, stands the Aghaiani church of Saint Nino.

== See also ==
- Shida Kartli
- Battle of Aghaiani
- Aghaiani church of Saint Nino
- Aghayan
