= Konstantine Bagration of Mukhrani (1838–1903) =

Georgian nobleman and Imperial Russian Officer

Konstantine "Kote" Bagration of Mukhrani (Georgian: კონსტანტინე [კოტე] მუხრანბატონი, Konstantine [Kote] Mukhranbatoni; 24 December 1838 – 2 May 1903) was a Georgian nobleman, of the House of Mukhrani, and a military officer in the Imperial Russian service.

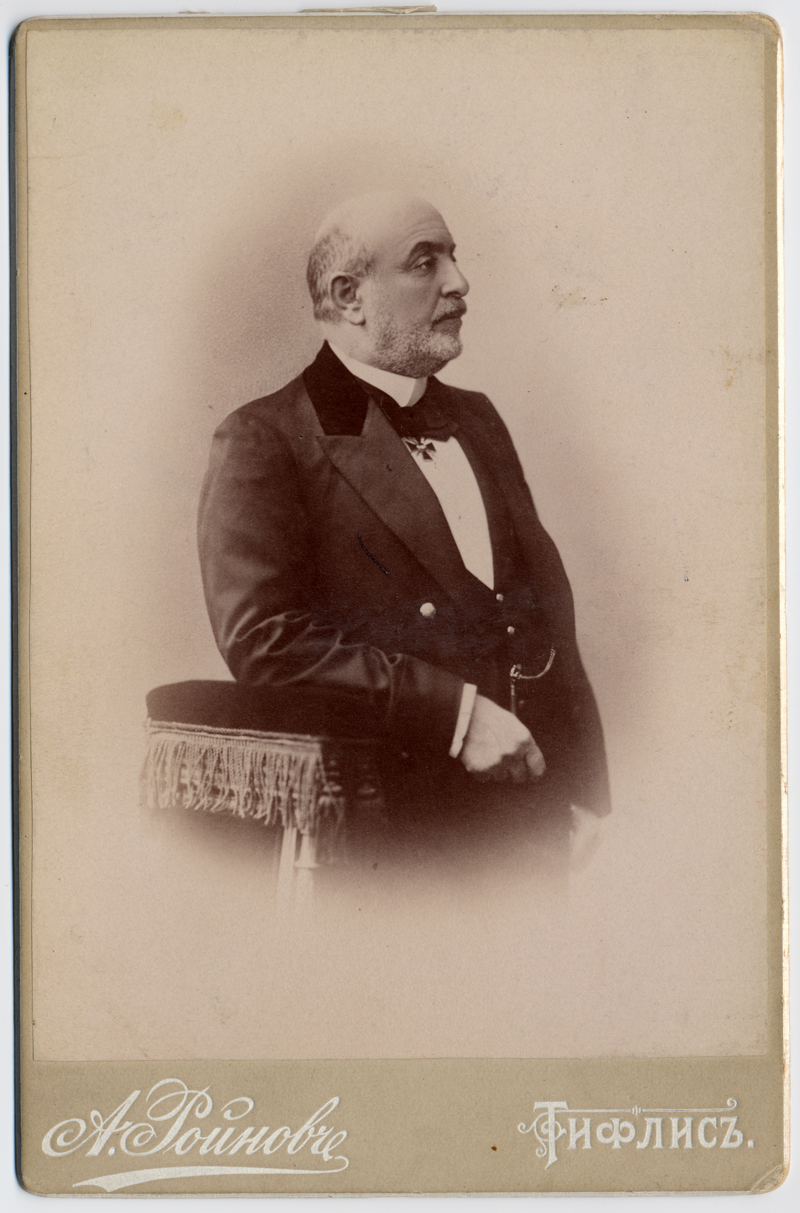
Constantine Bagration of Mukhrani

Konstantine was born into the family of General Prince Ivane Bagration of Mukhrani and his wife, Princess Nino née Dadiani. Like his father, whom he succeeded as the head of the House of Mukhrani, Konstantine was a military officer in the Russian service. He took part in the Crimean and Caucasian wars and rose to a regimental commander in the Russo-Turkish War (1877–78). Afterward, he retired with the rank of major-general and returned to the legacy of his father as a landowner and entrepreneur. Also, he was elected as Marshal of Nobility of the Tiflis Governorate from 1895 to 1901. In 1895, he, further, was granted the title of Jägermeister ("Master of the Hunt") at the Imperial Russian court and periodically lived in St. Petersburg. He provided financial support to several Georgian cultural institutions, such as the projected Georgian University, and scholarships for Georgian students in various Russian academia.
