= Vashakidze =

Vashakidze is a Georgian surname. Notable people with the surname include:

- Irakli Vashakidze (born 1976), Georgian footballer
- Mikheil Vashakidze (1909–1956), Georgian astronomer
- Tamaz Vashakidze (born 1961), Georgian ballet dancer and teacher

== See also ==
- Vashakidze (crater), lunar impact crater
