= Palace of Mukhrani =

Palace in Mukhrani, Georgia

- მუხრანის სასახლე (Georgian)
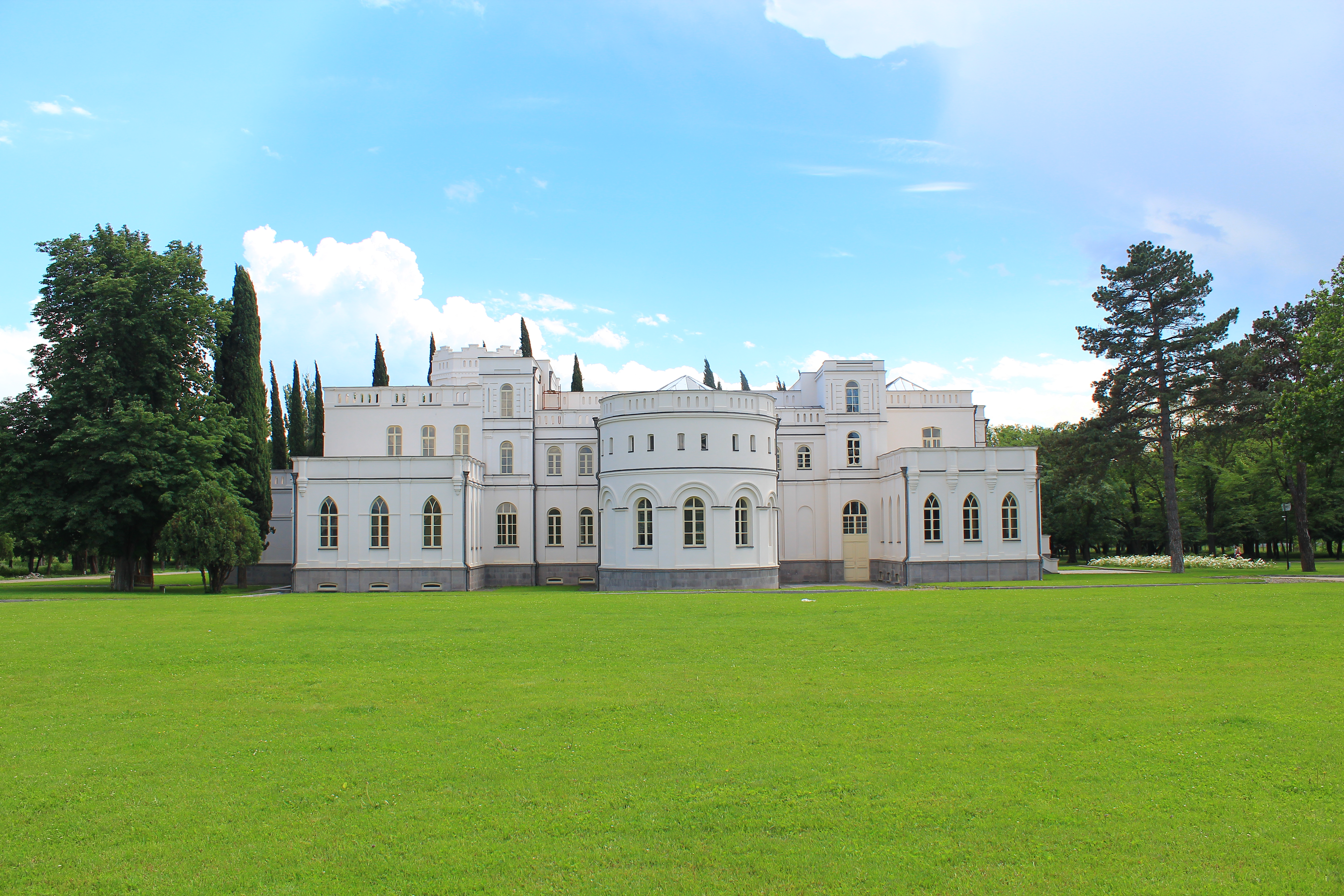
- Château Mukhrani

- Location within Mtskheta-Mtianeti Location within Georgia
- 41°56′31″N 44°34′53″E
- Type: Château
- Location: (Georgia (country)) Natakhtari-Tsilkani-Mukhrani, Mukhrani 3309, Georgia

History
- Built: 1885
- Built for: Ivane Bagration of Mukhrani

Site notes
- Area: Mtskheta-Mtianeti
- Architectural style: French
- Restored: 2012
- Restored by: TBC Bank
- Owner: House of Mukhrani

Palace of Mukhrani (Georgian: მუხრანის სასახლე) was a seat of the princely House of Mukhrani. It is located in Mukhrani, in the eastern part of Georgia.

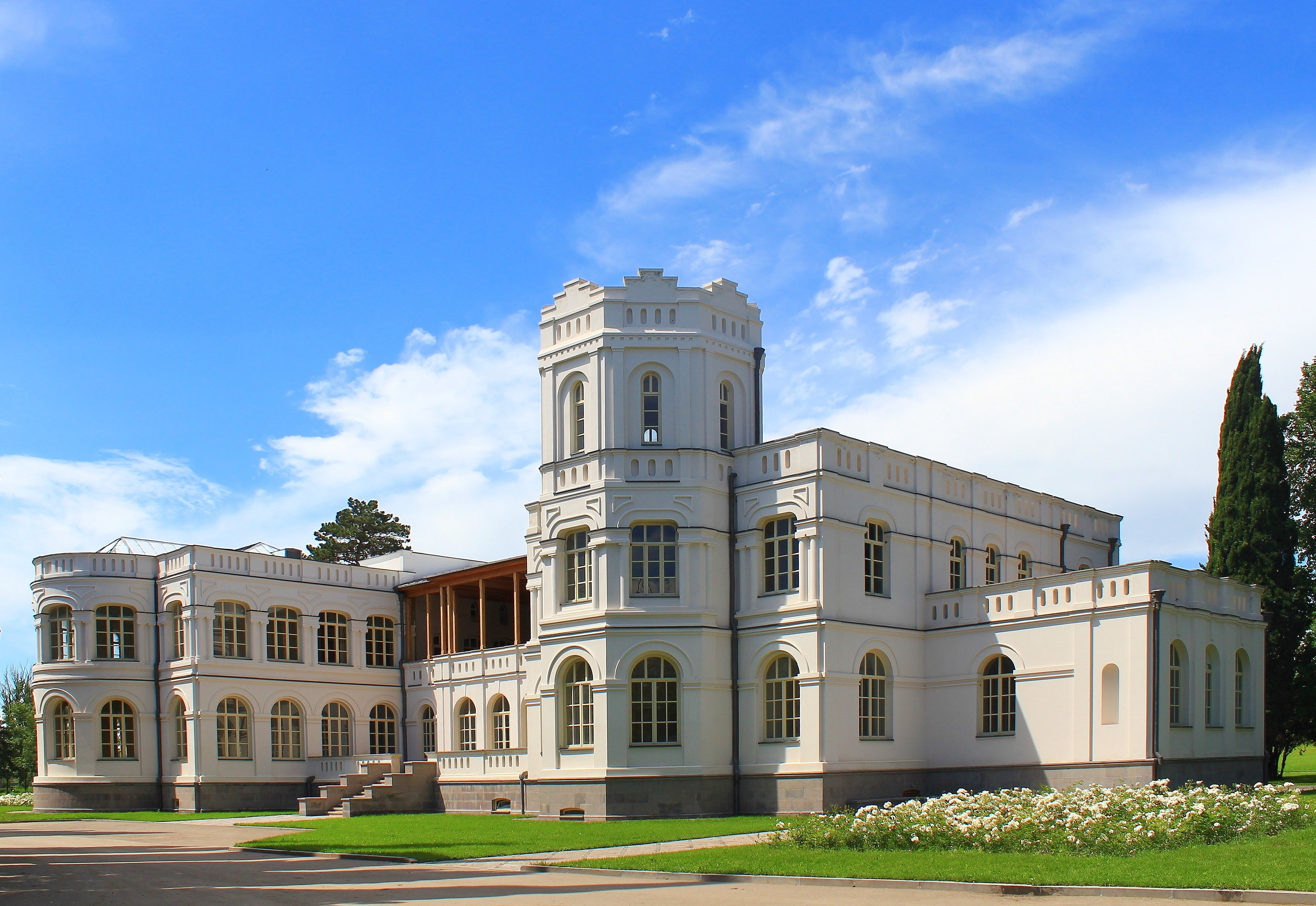
Alternate view

== History ==
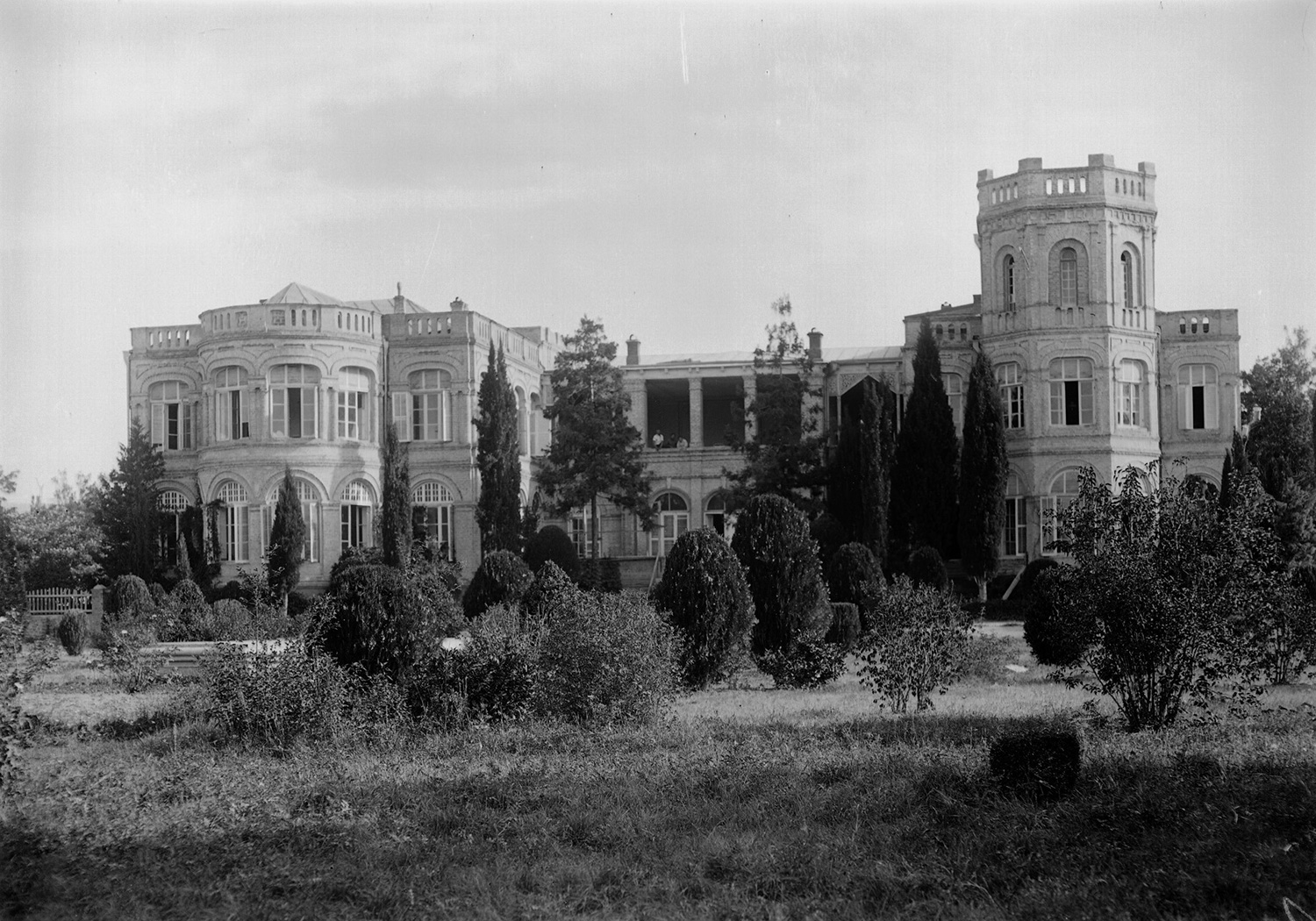
Château as it appeared in the 19th century

The main building was designed in 1873 by the French architects for Prince Ivane Bagration of Mukhrani. Construction of the palace took 12 years. The gardener was invited from the Palace of Versailles.

The Mukhrani residence was an important cultural and political center for the Georgian elite of the Belle Époque. It was renovated by the TBC Bank in 2012.

The patrimony now belongs to the "Château Mukhrani" wine company.
