= Agung Rai Museum of Art =

Coordinates: 8.5184°S 115.2621°E

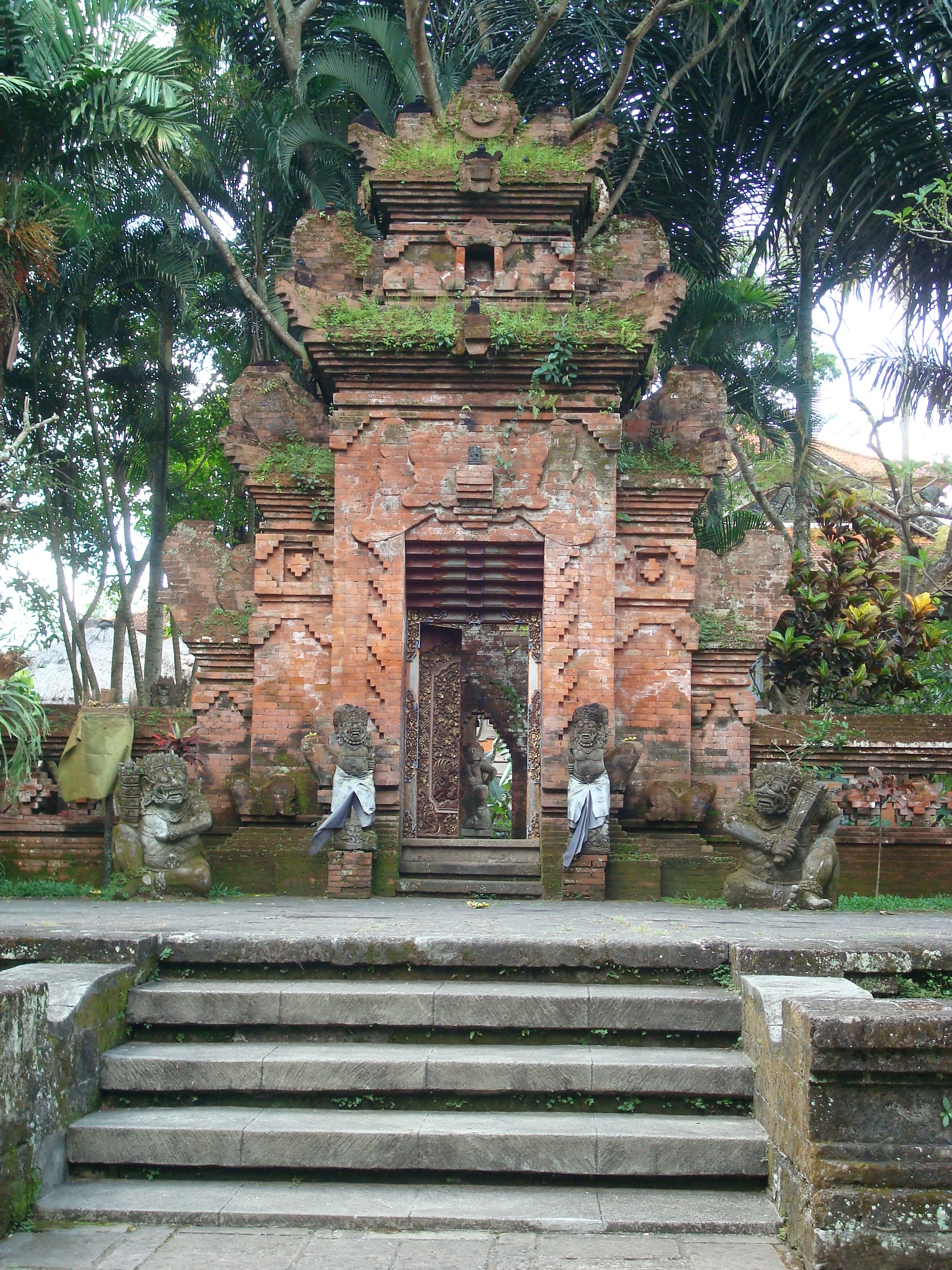
The Agung Rai Museum of Art

The Agung Rai Museum of Art (ARMA) is an art museum in Ubud, Bali, Indonesia. The museum was founded by Agung Rai and opened in 1996.

== History ==
The museum was established by Agung Rai and officially opened on 9 June 1996 by Wardiman Djojonegoro, then Indonesia's Minister of Education and Culture.

== Collections ==
The museum's collection includes traditional and contemporary works by Balinese, Indonesian and foreign artists. It includes classical Kamasan paintings and works by Batuan artists, as well as paintings by Raden Saleh and Walter Spies.

== Activities ==
The museum also serves as a centre for visual and performing arts. Its activities include temporary exhibitions, theatre, dance and music performances, painting classes, cultural workshops, seminars and training programs.

== See also ==
- List of museums and cultural institutions in Indonesia
