= House of Mukhrani =

Georgian princely family, branch of the Bagrationi dynasty

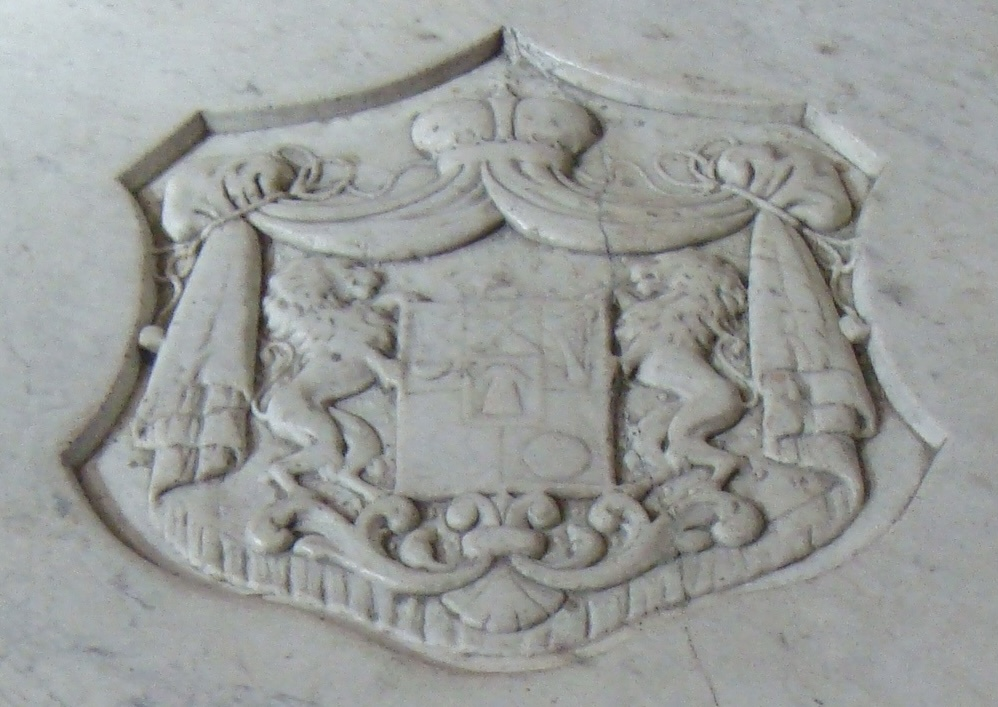
- Coat of arms of Mukhrani at Svetitskhoveli
- Parent house: Bagrationi dynasty
- Country: Kingdom of Kartli; Kingdom of Kartli-Kakheti
- Founded: 1512
- Founder: Bagrat, Prince of Mukhrani
- Current head: David Bagration of Mukhrani
- Final ruler: Constantine IV of Mukhrani
- Titles: Tavadi

The House of Mukhrani is a Georgian princely family that is a branch of the former royal dynasty of Bagrationi, from which it sprang early in the 16th century, receiving in appanage the domain of Mukhrani, in the Kingdom of Kartli. The family — currently the seniormost genealogical line of the entire Bagrationi dynasty — has since been known as Mukhranbatoni (Georgian: მუხრანბატონი lit. 'Lords (batoni) of Mukhrani').

An elder branch of the house of Mukhrani, now extinct, furnished five royal sovereigns of Kartli between 1658 and 1724. Its descendants bore the Imperial Russian titles of Prince Gruzinsky (Грузи́нский, გრუზინსკი) and Princes Bagration (Багратион, ბაგრატიონი). Another branch, presiding in Mukhrani as tavadi and received among the princely nobility of Russia under the name of Bagration of Mukhrani (Bagration-Mukhransky; Багратион-Мухранский; Bagration-Mukhraneli, ბაგრატიონ-მუხრანელი), still flourishes and has, since 1957, claimed to be the Royal House of Georgia by virtue of being the genealogically eldest surviving line of the Bagrationi dynasty. David Bagration of Mukhrani has been the head of this house since January 16, 2008.

== History ==
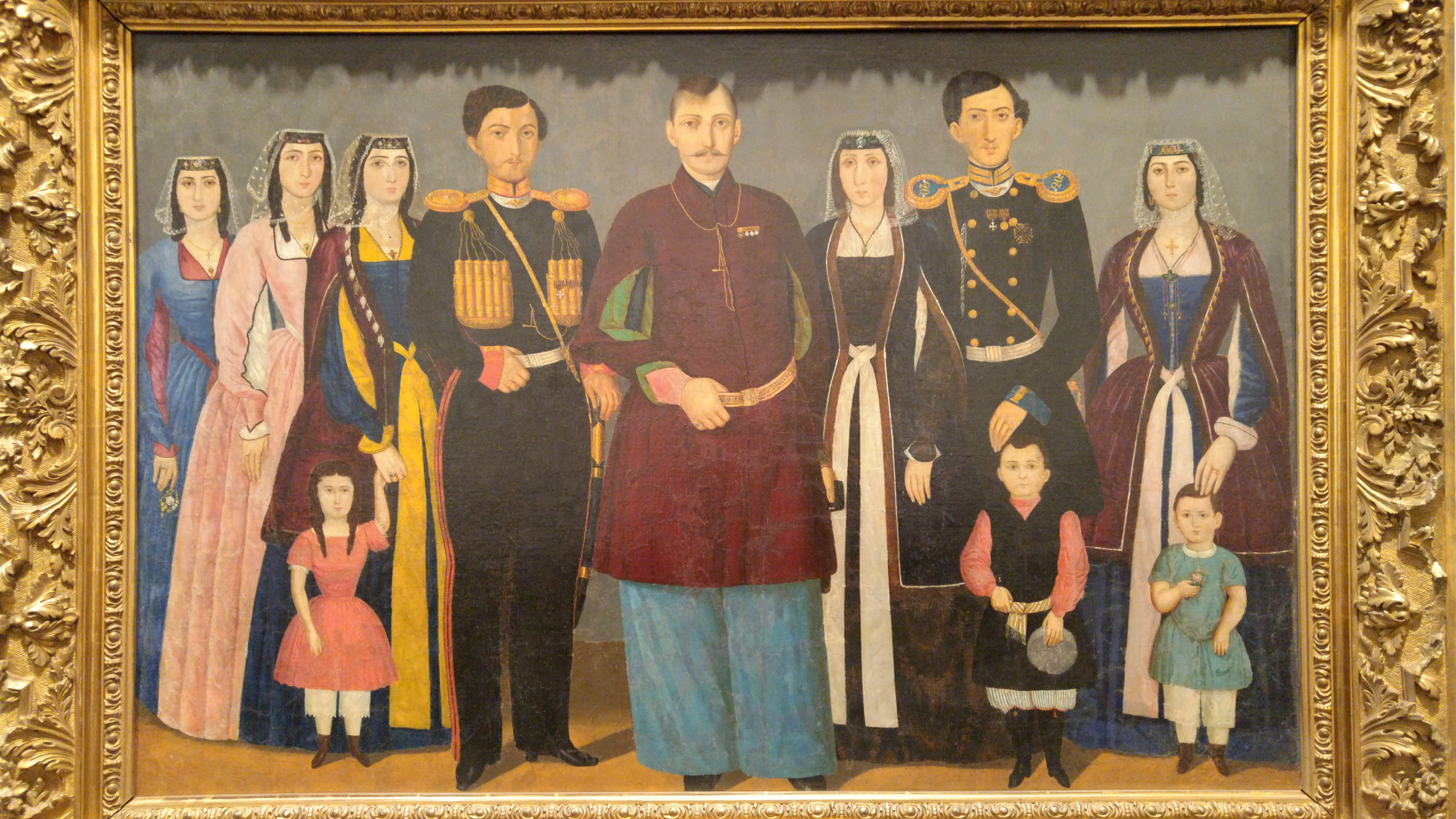
Prince Nicholas Bagration of Mukhrani with his family.

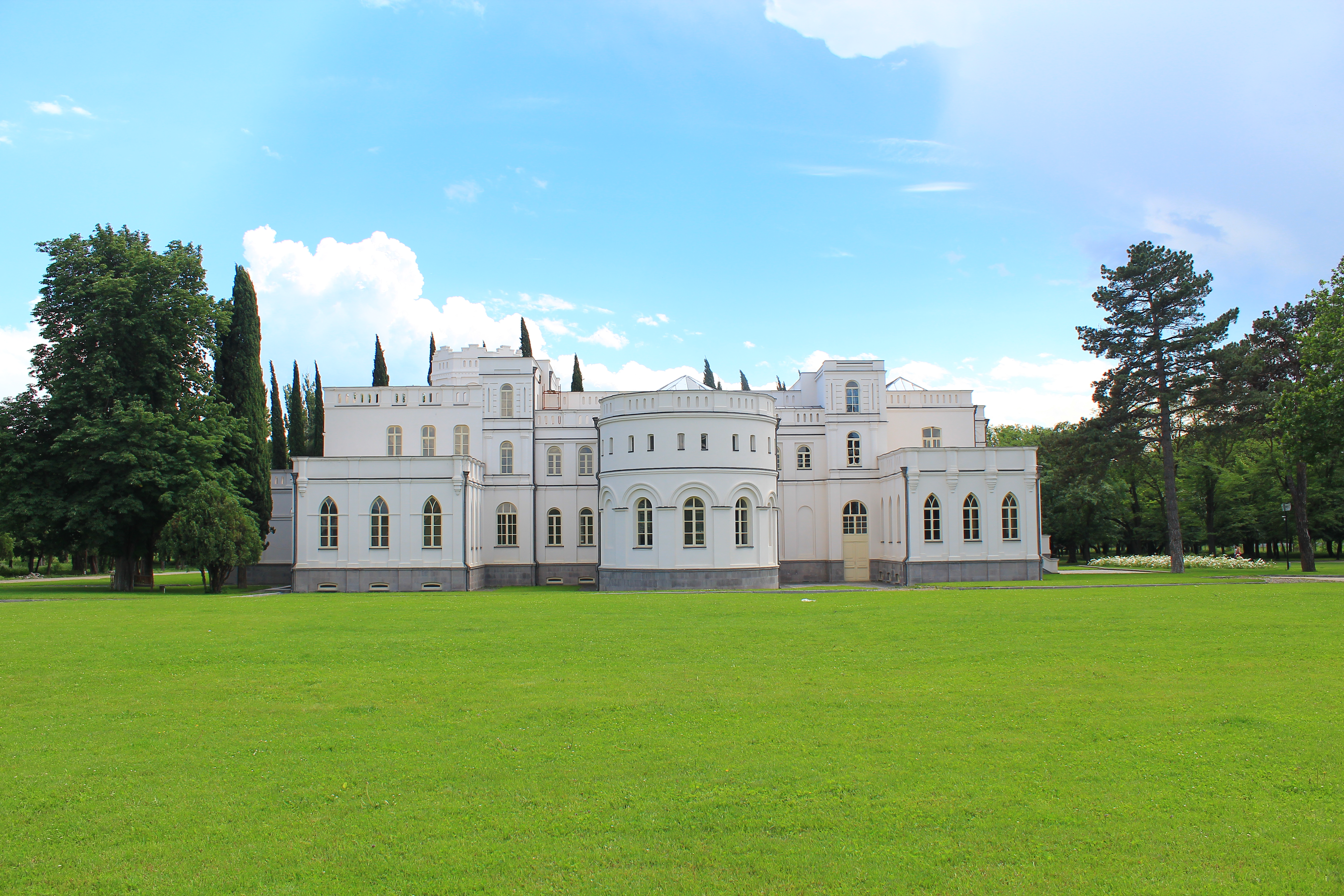
Palace of Mukhrani, built from 1873 to 1885 and restored in 2012.

Origins of the house of Mukhrani date back to 1512, when King David X of Kartli was obliged to create his younger brother Bagrat a hereditary lord of Mukhrani in order to secure his support against encroachments from another Georgian ruler, King George II of Kakheti. The Ksani fortress built then became a stronghold of the house. Subsequently, the residence was moved to Mukhrani village. Over time, the princes of Mukhrani exploited the weakness of royal authority and converted their fiefdom into an autonomous seigneury, satavado, that is "a holding of tavadi (prince)". On the death without heirs of King Rostom of Kartli, his adopted son Vakhtang, Prince of Mukhrani, succeeded on the throne as King Vakhtang V in 1659 and ceded the ownership of Mukhrani to his younger brother, Constantine I, ancestor of all the subsequent Princes of Mukhrani.

The descendants of Vakhtang V, the elder branch of the house of Mukhrani, retained the crown of Kartli until 1724, when the Ottoman invasion forced King Vakhtang VI and his household into exile in Russia, without, however, renouncing their rights to the throne. They formed two lines in exile, both accepted among the ranks of Russian princely nobility, knyaz. One of these, Princes Gruzinsky ("of Georgia"), descended from Vakhang VI's son Bakar and died out in 1892. The other, Princes Bagration, descending from Vakhang VI's nephew Alexander, was made famous by Pyotr Bagration, a Russian general of the Napoleonic Wars, and became extinct in male line in 1920, after the death of the brothers Dmitry and Alexander Bagration. The throne of Kartli eventually passed to their distant cousins from the Bagrationi dynasty of Kakheti. This new royal house united both Kartli and Kakheti into a single monarchy.

Constantine's scions, the branch of the house of Mukhrani, chose to stay in Kartli rather than follow Vakhtang VI to Russia. They remained in possession of Mukhrani under the Kakhetian Bagrationi and continued to exercise within the united kingdom of Georgia the hereditary positions of Mayor of the Palace of Georgia and High Constable of Upper Kartli. After Russia's annexation of Georgia in 1801, Georgia and Mukhrani ceased to exist as autonomous territories and its former rulers were confirmed as Russian princes in 1825 and 1850. This line became the genealogically senior representatives of the Bagrationi dynasty, as the elder branch of the house of Mukhrani had gone extinct in its male line by 1920. After the Bolshevik takeover of Georgia, the family relocated to Europe in 1930. In 1957, Prince Irakli Bagration of Mukhrani, having established himself in Spain, declared himself head of the Royal House of Georgia, which claim has been taken up by his descendants and is currently held by his grandson, David who has returned to Georgia. A rival claim, based on male primogeniture descent from the last kings of Kartli-Kakheti in eastern Georgia, comes from Prince Nugzar, head of the Bagration-Gruzinsky family, an offshoot of the Bagrationi of Kakheti.

== Intra-dynastic marriage ==
Prince Nugzar's daughter, Princess Anna Bagration-Gruzinsky, a divorced teacher and journalist with two daughters, married Prince David Bagration of Mukhrani, on 8 February 2009 at the Tbilisi Sameba Cathedral. The marriage united the Gruzinsky and Mukhrani branches of the Georgian royal family, and drew a crowd of 3,000 spectators, officials, and foreign diplomats, as well as extensive coverage by the Georgian media.

The dynastic significance of the wedding lay in the fact that, amidst the turmoil in political partisanship that has roiled Georgia since its independence in 1991, Patriarch Ilia II of Georgia publicly called for restoration of the monarchy as a path toward national unity in October 2007. Although this led some politicians and parties to entertain the notion of a Georgian constitutional monarchy, competition arose among the old dynasty's princes and supporters, as historians and jurists debated which Bagrationi has the strongest hereditary right to a throne that has been vacant for two centuries. Although some Georgian monarchists support the Gruzinsky branch's claim, others support that of the re-patriated Mukhrani branch. Both branches descend in unbroken, legitimate male line from the medieval kings of Georgia down to Constantine II of Georgia who died in 1505.

Whereas the Bagration-Mukhrani were a cadet branch of the former Royal House of Kartli, they became the genealogically seniormost line of the Bagrationi family in the early 20th century: yet the elder branch had lost the rule of Kartli by 1724.

Meanwhile, the Bagration-Gruzinsky line, although junior to the Princes of Mukhrani genealogically, reigned over the kingdom of Kakheti, re-united the two realms in the kingdom of Kartli-Kakheti in 1762, and did not lose sovereignty until Russian annexation in 1800.

The bridegroom is the only member of his branch who retains Georgian citizenship and residence since the death of his father, Prince George Bagration-Mukhrani in 2008. Aside from his unmarried elder brother, Prince David is the heir male of the Bagrationi family, while the bride's father is the most senior descendant of the last Bagrationi to reign over the Kingdom of Kartli-Kakheti. Since Nugzar and his cousin, Prince Eugene Bagration-Gruzinsky (b. 1947, married with no children), are the last patrilineal males descended from King George XIII, their branch verges on extinction. But the marriage between Nugzar Gruzinsky's heiress and the Mukhrani heir resolves their rivalry for the claim to the throne, which has divided Georgian monarchists. The son born of this marriage, prince Giorgi Bagrationi (born on September 27, 2011) is apt to eventually become both the heir male of the House of Bagrationi and the heir general of King George XII.

== Hereditary princes of Mukhrani ==
- Bagrat (1512–1540)
- Vakhtang I (1540–1580)
  - Ashotan I (co-prince, 1540–1561)
- Heraclius I (1580–1605)
- Teimuraz I (1605–1625)
- Kaikhosro (1625–1626)
- David I (1626–1628), (was bestowed by King Teimuraz I of Kakheti)
- Vakhtang II (1629–1658)
- Constantine I (1658–1668)
- Teimuraz II (1668–1688)
- Ashotan II (1688–1692)
- Papuna (1692–1696, 1703–1710)
- Constantine II (1696–1700)
- Jesse I (c. 1700)
- Heraclius II (1717–1719)
- Levan (1719–1721)
  - Jesse II (1719–1724)
- Mamuka (1730–1735)
- Constantine III (1735–1756)
- Simon (1756–1778)
- Ioane (1778–1801)
- Constantine IV (1801–1842)
- Ivane (1842–1895)
- Constantine (1895–1903)
- Alexander (1903–1918)
- George (1918–1957)
- Irakli (1957–1977)
- George (1977–2008)
- David (2008–present)

== See also ==
Princely branch of Mukhranbatoni and Bagration-Mukhrani

Constantine II (1447–1505); King of Kartli and Imereti; 1478–1484; King of Kartli; 1484–1505
David X (1482–1526); King of Kartli; 1505–1525	George IX (1486–1534); King of Kartli; 1525–1527 ×	Bagrat Mukhranbatoni (c. 1487–c. 1540); 1512–1540
Royal branch of Kartli	Vakhtang Mukhranbatoni (1510–1580); 1540–1580
Teimuraz Mukhranbatoni (1572–1625); 1605–1625
Bakhuta Mukhranbatoni (1618–1675); 1629–1558 (Adopted by King Rostom)	Bagrat ?–Until 1658	Constantine Mukhranbatoni (fl.1622–1667); 1658–1568
Papua Mukhranbatoni (1651–1717); 1691–1696	Teimuraz Mukhranbatoni (1649–1688); 1668–1688
Levan Mukhranbatoni (1670–1739); 1719–1721	Constantine Mukhranbatoni (died 1716); 1696–1700
Simon Mukhranbatoni (1726–1785); 1756–1778	Ioane (1727–1793)	Constantine Mukhranbatoni (1696–1756); 1739–1756
Katsia (c. 1764–1826) (†1826)	David (†1828)	Edisher (1787–?)	Ioane Mukhranbatoni (1755–1801); 1778–1801
Simon (1796–?)	Solomon (1810–1844)	Nikoloz (1807–1864)	Constantine Mukhranbatoni (1782–1842); 1801	David (1793–1878)
Aleksandre (1824–?)	Dimitri (1842–1884)	Giorgi (1834–1884)	Ivane Mukhranbatoni (1812–1895)	Irakli Mukhranbatoni (1813–1892)	Mikheil (1831-1907)	Nikoloz (1822-1885)	Estate (1830–1908)
Aleksandre (1864–1897)	Giorgi (1870–1933)	Nikoloz (1865–1933) ×	Mikheil (1872–1942)	David (1877–1940)	Constantine (1838–1903) ×	Aleksandre Mukhranbatoni (1853–1918)	Aleksandre (1856–1935)	Diodore (1873–1935)	Giorgi (1875–1928)
Vladimer (1894–1969)	Dimitri (1892–1960)	Constantine (1894–1963)	Irakli (1910–1940)	Leonide (1909–1999)	Giorgi Mukhranbatoni (1884–1957)	Mikheil (1883-1926)	Giorgi (1886–1935)	Dimitri (1901–1937)	Teimuraz (1915–?)
Otar (1918–1988)	Mariam (b. 1947)	Medea (b. 1922)	Rusudan (b. 1926)	Medea (b. 1938)	Irina (b. 1944)	Irakli (1909–1977)	Mariam (1910–1992)	Leonida (1914–2010)	Aleksandre (1909-1978)	Constantine (1915-1992)	Mikheil (b. 1920)	Giorgi (b. 1932)	Giorgi (b. 1950)
Vladimer (b. 1947)	Lia (b. 1957)	Giorgi (1944–2009)	Mariam (b. 1947)	Bagrat (born. 1949)	Mikheil (b. 1938)	Irine (b. 1942)	Ketevan (b. 1954)	Aleksandre (b. 1956)	Thamar (b. 1950)	Dimitri (b. 1971)
Nino (b. 1971)	Otar (b. 1973)	Maria (b. 1969)	Irakli (b. 1972)	David (b. 1976)	Hugo (b. 1985)	Ivane (b. 1977)	Inesa (b. 1980)	Aleksandre (b. 1973)	Irakli (b. 1977)
