= Sadrosho =

sadrosho (Georgian: სადროშო; literally, "of a banner") was an administrative division in medieval and early modern Georgia which supplied men for a subdivision of the army marked by its own banner. A tactical unit furnished by this territorial unit was also known as sadrosho, each under the command of a military official, sardali.

== United Kingdom of Georgia ==
The origin of the sadrosho system traces its origin to the period of a united Georgian monarchy, the Bagratid kingdom of Georgia (1008–1491), which, according to the 18th-century historian Prince Vakhushti of Kartli, was subdivided into four principal sadrosho:

- metsinave (მეწინავე), "avant-garde", was furnished by the southern provinces of Upper and of Lower Kartli.
- memarjvene (მემარჯვენე), "right flank", was provided by the western provinces of Imereti and Abkhazia.
- memartskhene (მემარცხენე), "left flank", was supplied by the easternmost provinces of Kakheti and Hereti.
- mepis (მეფის), "royal", by Inner Kartli.

== After the united monarchy ==
With the fragmentation of the Kingdom of Georgia in the latter half of the 15th century, the unified military organization collapsed and the three successor kingdoms—Kakheti, Kartli, and Imereti—reestablished their own systems of sadrosho. In Kakheti, newly created sadrosho were put under the command of bishops, generally more loyal to the king than princes (tavadi), who filled the similar positions in Kartli, usually as hereditary offices, and were prone to defiance to the central royal authority. Over time, the number and administration of sadrosho underwent several changes, but the system survived until the Russian annexation of the Georgian monarchies in the early 19th century.

=== List of sadrosho in Kakheti ===
- metsinave, "avant-garde", was under the bishop of Bodbe (bodbeli) and consisted of the district of Kiziki up to the village of Kisiskhevi.
- memarjvene, "right flank", was commanded by the bishop of Nekresi (nekreseli) and comprised much of Thither Kakheti up to the town of Gremi.
- memartskhene, "left flank", was subjected to the bishop of Rustavi (rustveli) and commanded much of Outer Kakheti from Kisiskhevi to the Aragvi river, including Martkopi and Saguramo.
- mepis, "royal", was commanded by a royally-appointed person, not infrequently by a crown prince, and covered much of Inner Kakheti and the territory of the Bishopric of Alaverdi west from Gremi, including the Pankisi gorge.

=== List of sadrosho in Kartli ===
- metsinave, "avant-garde", included Lower Kartli—the districts of Somkhiti and Sabaratiano—and was under the hereditary command of the Princes Baratashvili and their offshoot, the Princes Orbeliani.
- memarjvene, "right flank", included Inner Kartli and was hereditarily commanded by the Princes Amilakhvari.
- memartskhene, "left flank", comprised Samukhranbatono and the duchies of Aragvi and Ksani, and was under the hereditary command of the Princes Mukhranbatoni.
- mepis, "royal", included parts of Kartli along the right bank of the Mtkvari river from Tbilisi to Tashiskari and the estates of the Catholicos. The banner was under the command of a royally-appointed officer, frequently from the princely family of Tsitsishvili.

=== List of sadrosho in Imereti ===
- metsinave, "avant-garde", included the districts of Vake and Salominao and the fiefs of the Princes Chkheidze and Chijavadze.
- memarjvene, "right flank", included the district of Argveti.
- memartskhene, "left flank", was the Duchy of Racha.
- mepis, "royal", comprised the districts of Lechkhumi and Okriba.
