= Batoni (title) =

Batoni (Georgian: ბატონი) is a Georgian word for "lord", or "master". It is derived from patroni (პატრონი), the earlier term of similar meaning, and appears in common usage in the 15th century.

- In Georgian feudal hierarchy, "batoni" may denote the supreme suzerain (i.e., monarch), seigneur, or any secular or clerical who owned qma, i.e., "slave" or "serf". The word sometimes appears as a part of the royal and nobiliary titulature. For example, the title of the Princes of Mukhrani was batoni (Mukhran-batoni), and the early kings of Kakheti were likewise referred to by that title in some Georgian sources.
- In modern usage, batoni is an honorific used for a man, an equivalent of both Mr. and sir. The equivalent female title is kalbatoni (ქალბატონი). It can be used with the full name as well as either the last or first name. When addressing someone directly, the word is used in a vocative case (kal)batono ([ქალ]ბატონო), and precedes either the first name (more commonly) or the last name, but it can also be used by itself in direct address.

== See also ==
- Batonishvili
