= Mukhrani =

Mukhrani მუხრანი Mukhnari
- Historical region
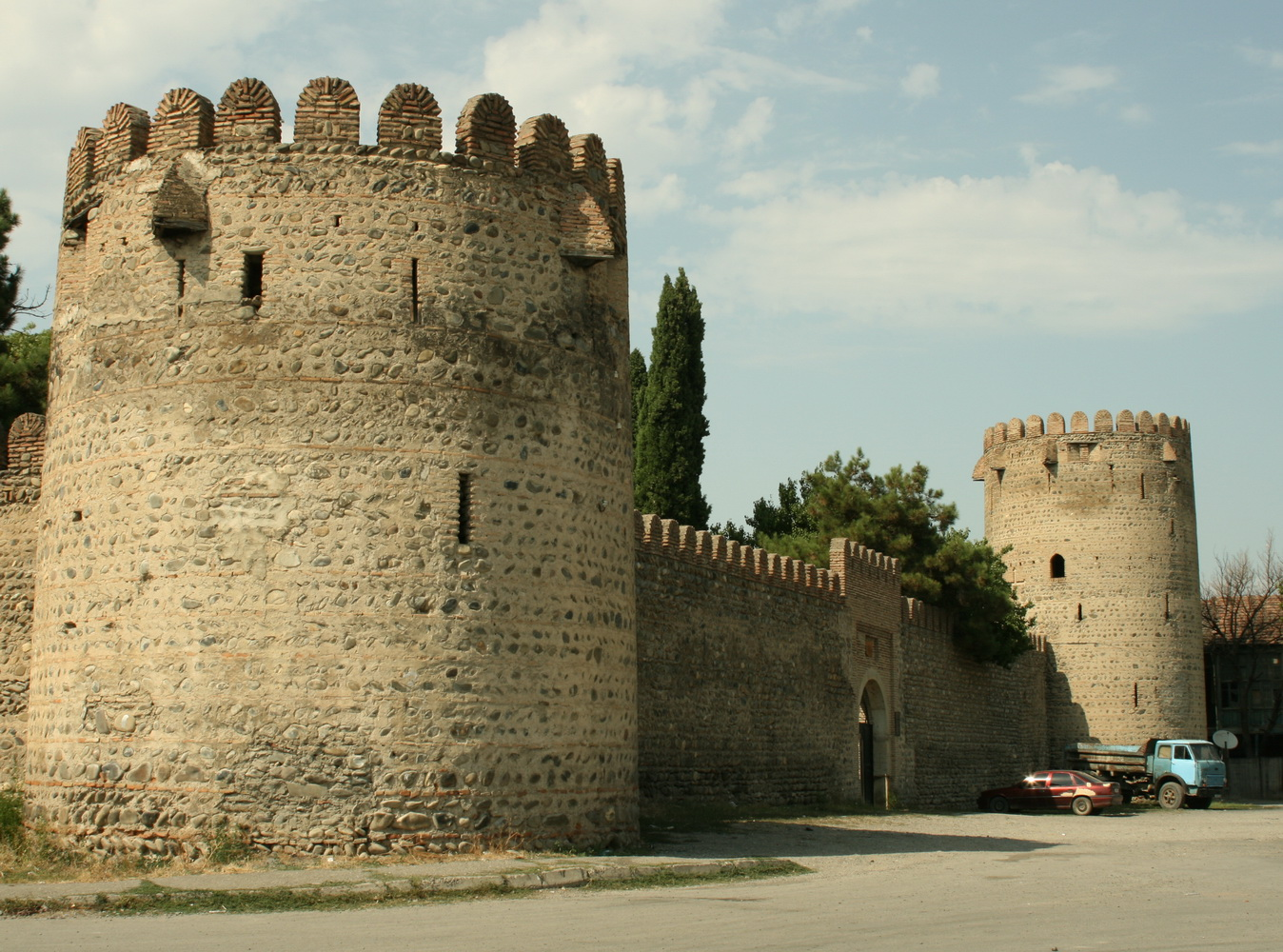
- The castle of Mukhrani
- Interactive map of Mukhrani
- Coordinates: 41°56′02″N 44°34′36″E
- Country: Georgia
- Mkhare: Mtskheta-Mtianeti

Mukhrani (Georgian: მუხრანი [muχɾani]), originally Mukhnari (მუხნარი [muχnaɾi]), is a historical lowland district in eastern Georgia, currently within the borders of Mtskheta-Mtianeti region, north of the town of Mtskheta. It lies within the historical borders of Kartli, bounded by the Kura River, and its two affluents: Ksani and Aragvi. Today Mukhrani has one of the biggest populations among Georgian villages.

== History ==
Strategically located on major transit routes traversing ancient and medieval Georgia, easily irrigable and fertile, Mukhrani was an economically advanced area and, in some sense, a link between Kartli’s lowland and highland districts.

In the 2nd-4th centuries AD, the area was home to Dzalisi, one of the most important settlements of Caucasian Iberia. Medieval Georgian annals describe Mukhrani as a forested area greatly favored by the Georgian kings as a hunting ground. We then hear of the noble family of Dzaganisdze being in possession of this district from the 8th/9th century to 1123 when the king David IV confiscated it. Mukhrani became a flourishing sector of the royal domain, and its portion was subsequently donated by the crown to the monastery of Shio-Mghvime and the cathedral of Sveti-Tskhoveli.

In 1512, Mukhrani passed, in hereditary ownership, to a collateral branch of the Bagrationi royal dynasty of Kartli. This occurred when the district was scrounged from King David X of Kartli by his younger brother Bagrat in reward for crucial assistance against the neighboring Georgian ruler George II of Kakheti. Henceforth, the lord of Mukhrani came to be known as the Mukhran-Batoni, and the branch of Bagrations which held it as the Bagrationi-Mukhraneli (some members of which were later naturalised in Russia as the "Princes Bagration-Moukransky"). As royal authority declined, Mukhrani evolved into an autonomous seigneury called a satavado, that is "a holding of tavadi", or Georgian principality. It was known as Samukhranbatono, i.e., "[the land] of Mukhran-Batoni." The chief settlement of this princedom was Shios-Ubani, since the 1770s known as the village of Mukhrani, while a fortress built at the confluence of the Mtkvari and Ksani early in the 16th century served as a principal stronghold in the area. Other villages over which the Mukhran-Batoni held sway were Aghaiani, Kandagiani, Tezi, Okami and, for a certain period of time, Lamisqana and Gremiskhevi. The autonomous status of Mukhrani lasted until the Russian annexation of eastern Georgia in 1801, but was not fully abolished until the 1840s.
