= Sergo Vardosanidze =

Georgian history professor (born 1955)

- Born: December 3, 1955 (age 70); Zovreti, Georgian SSR, USSR

Academic work
- Discipline: History
- Institutions: St. Andrew the First-Called Georgian University Of the Patriarchate of Georgia

Sergo Vardosanidze (Georgian: სერგო ვარდოსანიძე) is a Georgian historian. He serves as the Professor and Rector of the Saint Andrew the First-Called Georgian University of the Patriarchate of Georgia.

== Early life ==
He graduated from Sulkhan-Saba Orbeliani in Tbilisi State Pedagogical Institute. He completed a postgraduate course at Iv. Javakhishvili Institute of History and Ethnology of Academy of Sciences of Georgia, specializing in History of Georgia. PhD (History), Professor.

== Career ==
He worked at K.D.Ushinski #1 experimental school as a history teacher and deputy headmaster. At Sulkhan-Saba Orbeliani Tbilisi Pedagogical University he was an associate professor, full professor of Georgian history, and chair and dean of Department of History. He was pro-rector and Georgian History Chair at Tbilisi Ecclesiastical Academy and Seminary.

== Books ==
- Kyrion II, His Holiness and Beatitude, Catholicos-Patriarch of all Georgia. Orthodox Cypsela Publishers (Greece), 1993, 30 pages
- Georgian Church (in English), Tbilisi, 1999, 14 pages (in German), Tbilisi, 1999, 15 pages
- Textbook of Georgian History, co-authors – R.Meterveli, I.Antelava
- Methods of Teaching History (Course of lectures, co-authors – Z.Chimakadze, I.Tskitishvili)
- Leonid, His Holiness and Beatitude, Catholicos-Patriarch of all Georgia. Tbilisi, 2000, 45 pages
- Georgian Orthodox Apostolic Church in 1917–1952. Metsniereba publishing house, Tbilisi, 2000 (a monograph), 323 pages
- Secondary school of Village Zovreti, Zestaponi Region, Tbilisi, 2002, 31 pages
- 20 centuries of Christianity in Georgia (a guide-book in Georgian and English), Tbilisi, 2004, 18 pages
- Problems of Georgian National Consciousness, Tbilisi, 2004, 125 pages
- Ephraim II, Catholicos-Patriarch of all Georgia, Tbilisi, 2007, 148 pages
- Ilia II, His Holiness and Beatitude, Catholicos-Patriarch of all Georgia, Tbilisi, 2008, 486 pages
- Ambrose, His Holiness and Beatitude, Catholicos-Patriarch of all Georgia, Tbilisi, 2009, 210 pages
- Callistratus, His Holiness and Beatitude, Catholicos-Patriarch of all Georgia, Tbilisi, 2009, 208 pages
- Christophorus, His Holiness and Beatitude, Catholicos-Patriarch of all Georgia, Tbilisi, 2009, 200 pages
- Georgian Bishops (XX-XXI centuries), Tbilisi, 2010, 513 pages
- A History of the Orthodox Church of Georgia, 1811 to the Present (in English, Switzerland, 2006, co-author. (1917-2002)
