= King David the Prophet's Church =

Orthodox church in Tbilisi

- Georgian: დავით მეფსალმუნის სახელობის ეკლესია
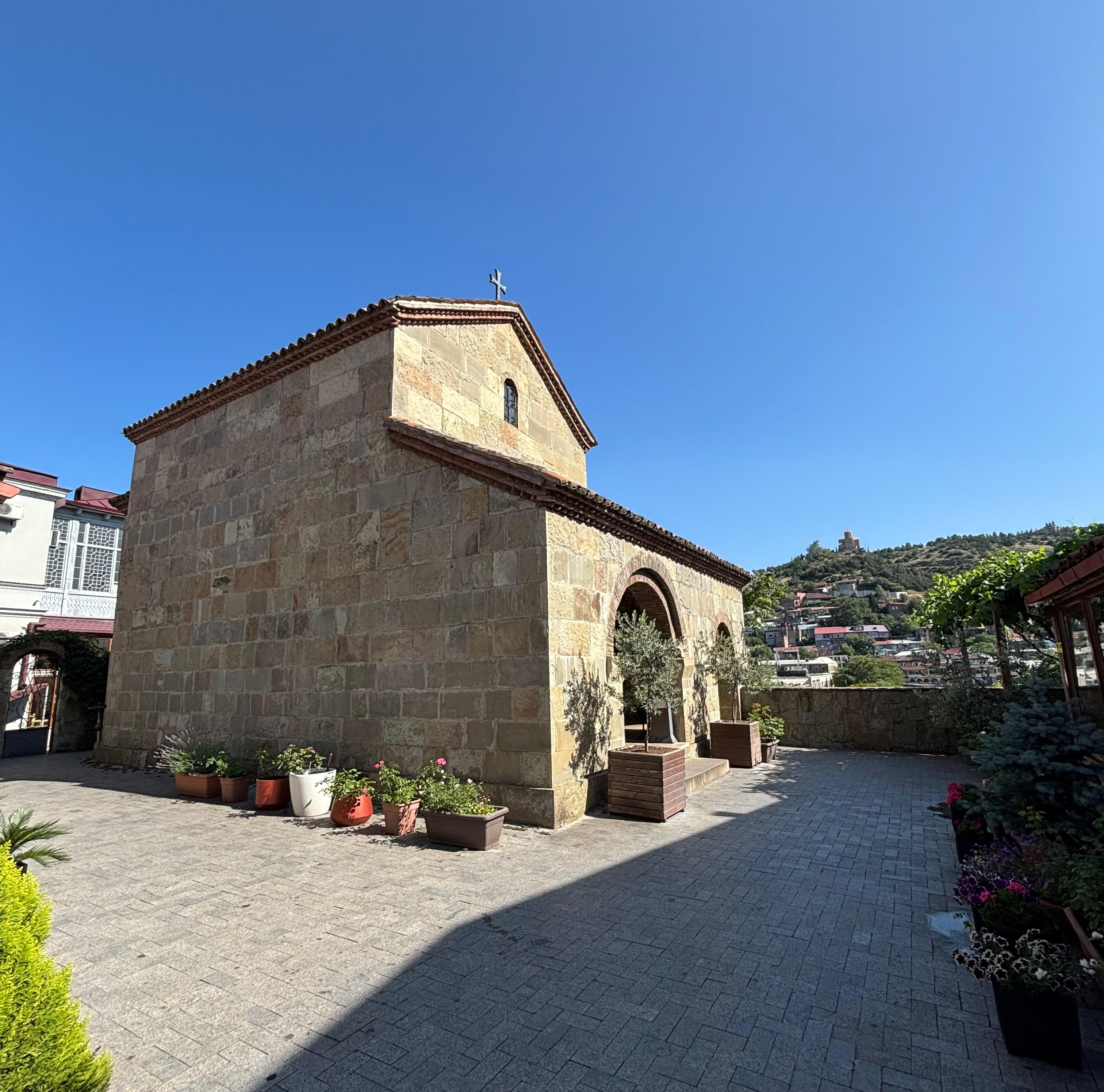
- Exterior of the church 2025

- Location of the church in Georgia

Religion
- Affiliation: Eastern Orthodox
- Rite: Georgian Orthodox Church
- Ecclesiastical or organizational status: Active
- Year consecrated: 11 September 2001

Location
- Location: 1 Metekhi Rise, Tbilisi
- Country: Georgia
- Interactive map of King David the Prophet's Church
- Coordinates: 41.689916°N 44.813291°E

Architecture
- Architect: Revaz Janashia
- Founder: Ilia II
- Funded by: Bigi Chkholaria Badri Patarkatsishvili Georgian Patriarchate
- Completed: 6 May 2001

The King David the Prophet's Church (Georgian: დავით მეფსალმუნის სახელობის ეკლესია) is a Georgian orthodox church located in the Avlabari district of Tbilisi, Georgia. It is the only church in the world to be dedicated to Saint David the Prophet - Psalmist.

== History ==
The Catholicos-Patriarch of All Georgia (Georgian: სრულიად საქართველოს კათოლიკოს პატრიარქი) Ilia II (Georgian: ილია II) decided to build a church dedicated to King David the Prophet, as at the time there was no temple in the world named after him.

The construction of the church started on 6 May 1997, and finished on 6 May 2001: the day in which Saint George's Day is celebrated in Georgia. The temple was consecrated on 11 September 2001, on the day of the Beheading of John the Baptist, and the Catholicos-Patriarch of All Georgia Ilia II celebrated the first liturgy.

As stated by the Deacon Tevdore Ambroladze (Georgian: დეკანოზი თევდორე ამბროლაძე), during the construction of the foundation of church they came across the remains of the 17th century Saint Marine Church. The foundation of the church was blessed by the same Deacon Tevdore together with Deacon Tariel Sikinchalashvili (Georgian: დეკანოზი ტარიელ სიკინჭალაშვილი).

The construction was financed by Bigi Chkholaria (Georgian: ბიგი ჩხოლარია) and the church was built in memory of his 8 years old son Giorgi (Georgian: გიორგი).

The church was consecrated as a monastery under Father Makari (Georgian: მამა მაკარი). Musical instruments were purchased and guitar, panduri (Georgian: ფანდური) and singing were taught to young people, creating an ensemble who performed in Racha (Georgian: რაჭა). Moreover, English, Russian, Georgian and mathematics were taught free of charge.

== Architecture ==
The church, a basilica with a pointed apse, was built in the old Georgian architectural style. The architect of the church was Revaz Janashia (Georgian: რევაზ ჯანაშია). The builders of the temple are Giorgi Beraia (Georgian: გიორგი ბერაია), Zurab Alania (Georgian: ზურაბ ალანია) and Murtaz Khvistani (Georgian: მურთაზ ხვისტანი).

The church is built with natural stones from Dzegvi (Georgian: ძეგვი) and old Georgian bricks. Moreover, stones from Nichbisi (Georgian: ნიჩბისი), Bodbe (Georgian: ბოდბე), Bolnisi (Georgian: ბოლნისი) and Chognari (Georgian: ჭოგნარი) have also been used.

The painting of the church was financed by the Georgian Patriarchate and it was done by Lasha Kintsurashvili (Georgian: ლაშა კინწურაშვილი). Badri Patarkatsishvili (Georgian: ბადრი პატარკაციშვილი) also donated 14 thousand dollars, which have been used for painting the church and to complete the bell tower. On the northern wall, a painting depicts an episode from the reign of David the Prophet in which the king, after declaring Jerusalem the capital, erected a new tabernacle moved in it, from the tent of Moses, the Ark of the Covenant. In the lower part of the northern wall, the little Giorgi Chkholaria is depicted kneeling in prayer with a lit candle in his hand. On the western wall, David the Prophet is depicted with the representatives of the Bagrationi dynasty, who consider themselves descendants of David: Ashot I the Great (Georgian: აშოტ I დიდი), Demetre I (Georgian: დემეტრე I), King Tamar (Georgian: თამარ მეფე). Moreover, there is a unique fresco of the Root of Jesse. On the eastern wall there is a fresco of the Virgin Mary-Platytera. On the southern wall there is a unique fresco of David's blessing.

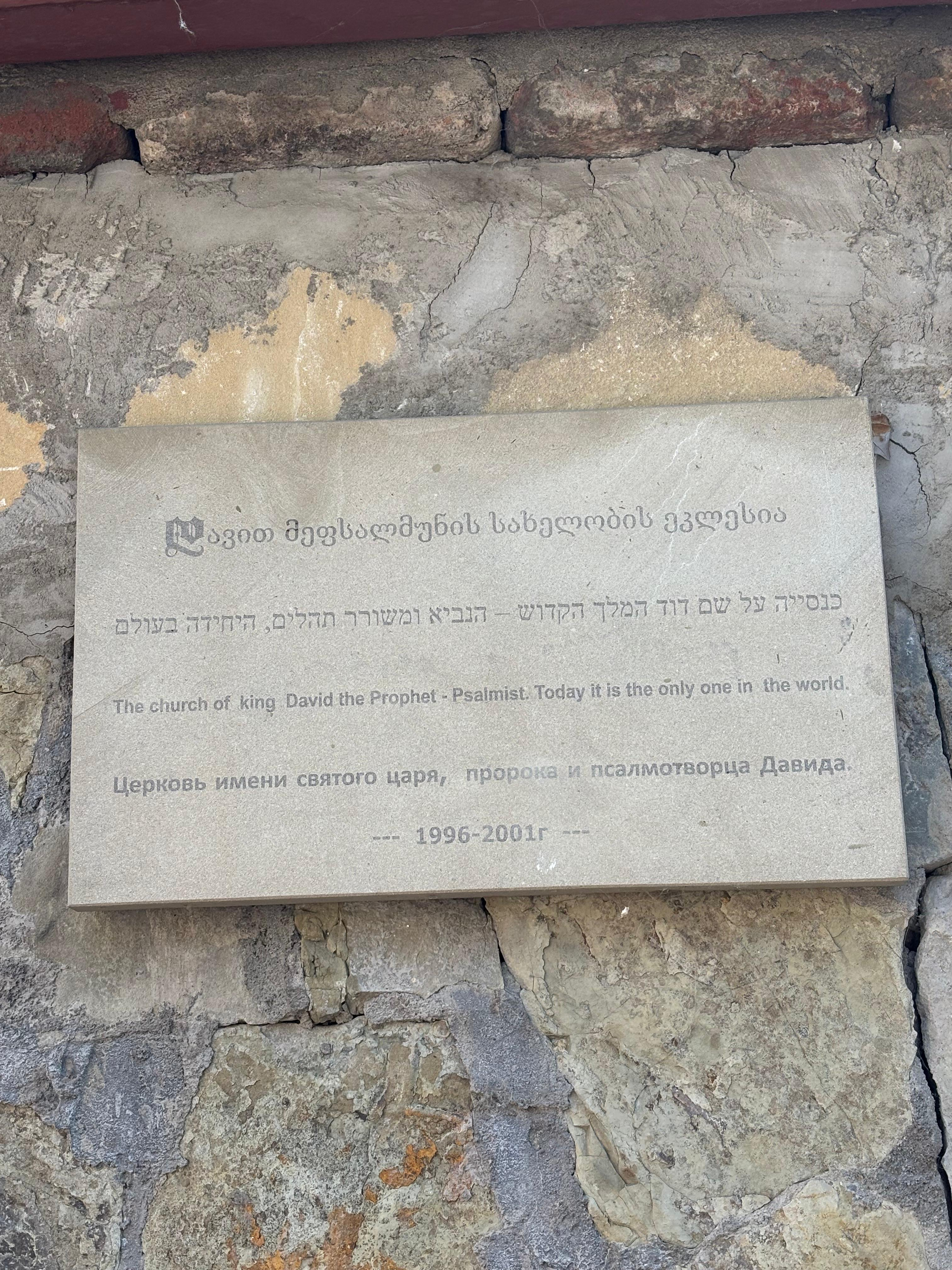
Plaque on the church's entrance

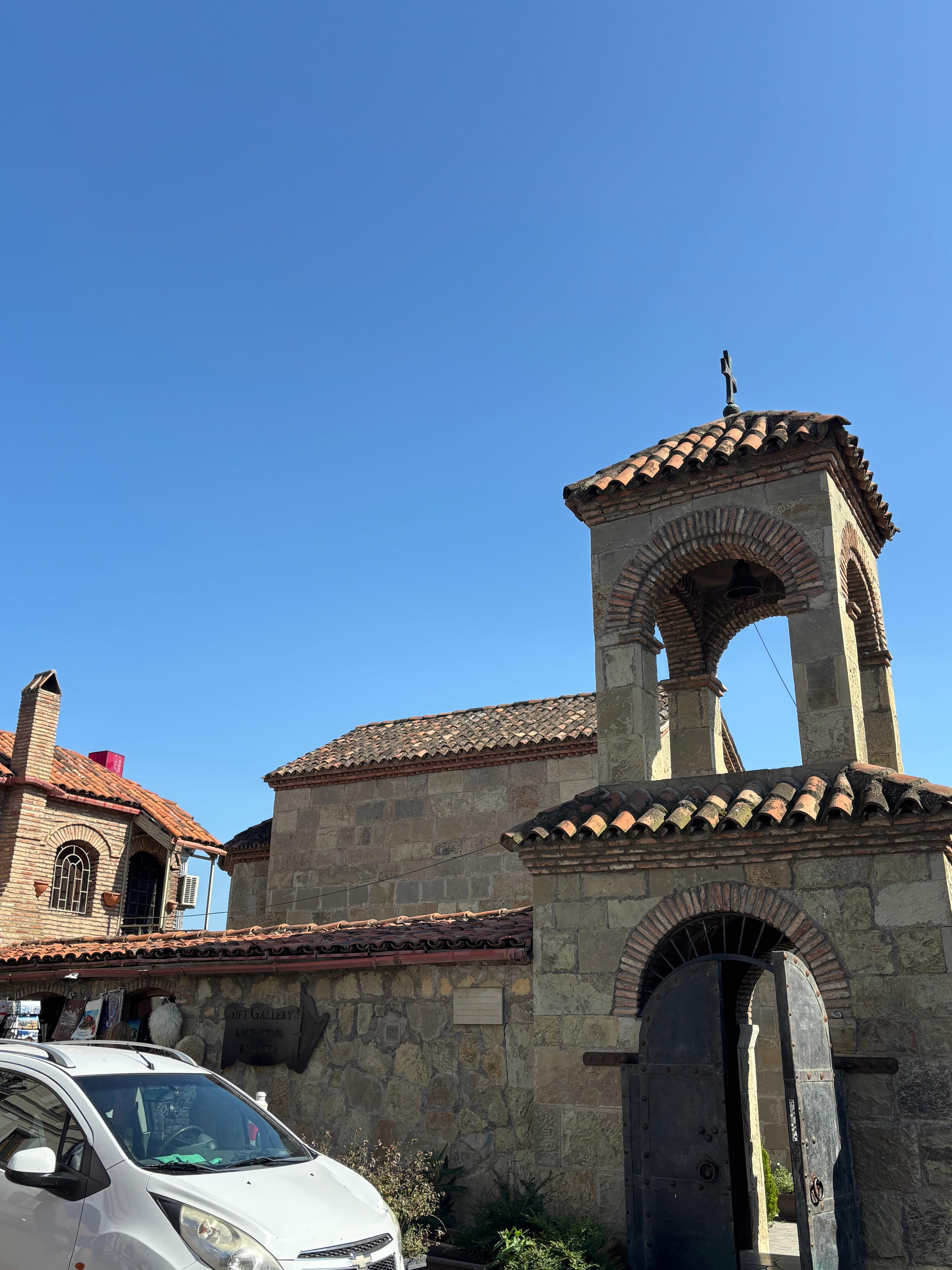
Entrance of the church

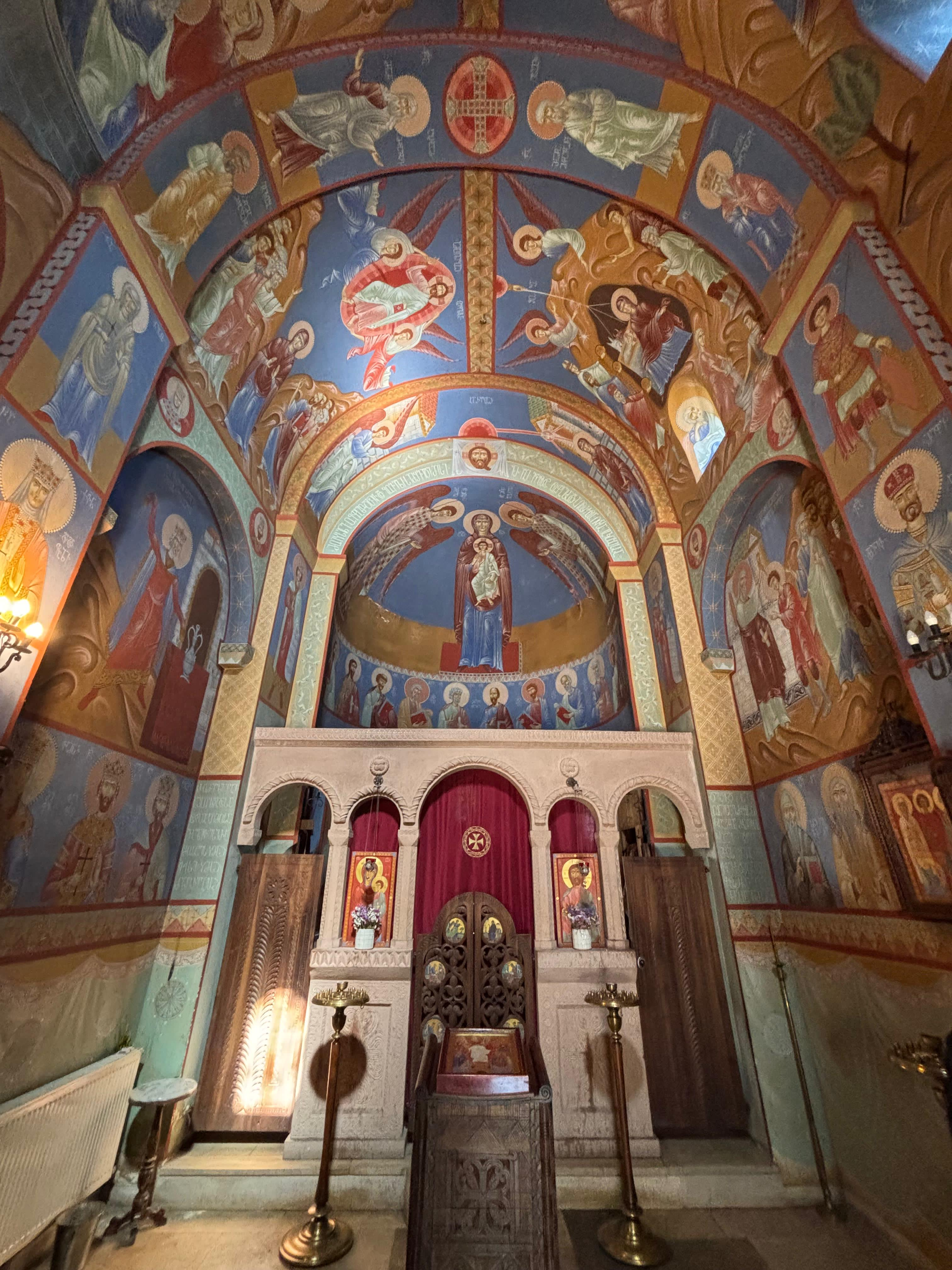
Interior of the church

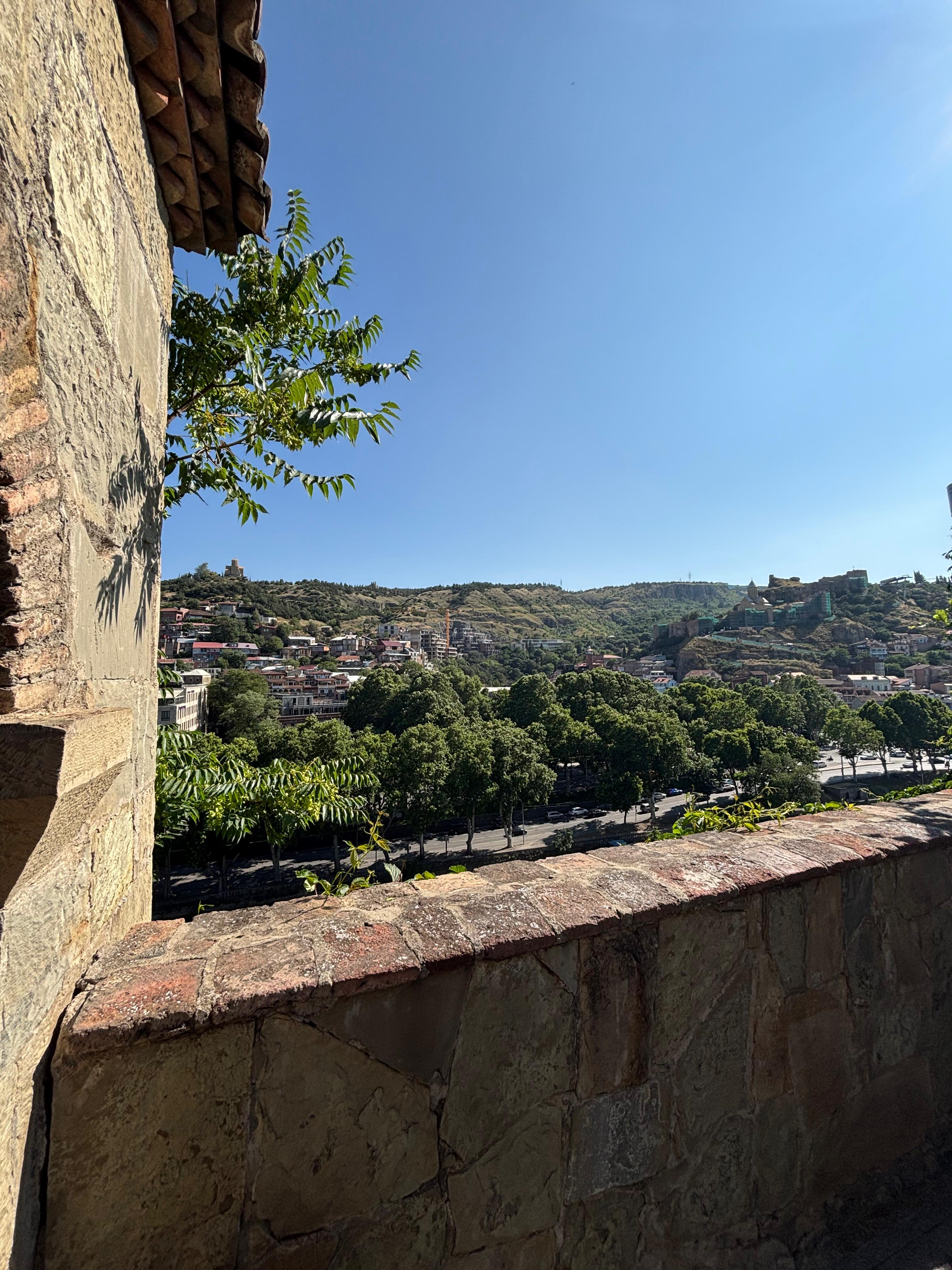
View from the yard of church
