= Ilia II of Georgia =

Patriarch of the Georgian Orthodox Church from 1977 to 2026

His Holiness and Beatitude Ilia II
- Catholicos-Patriarch of All Georgia, Archbishop of Mtskheta-Tbilisi and Metropolitan Bishop of Bichvinta and Tskhum-Abkhazia
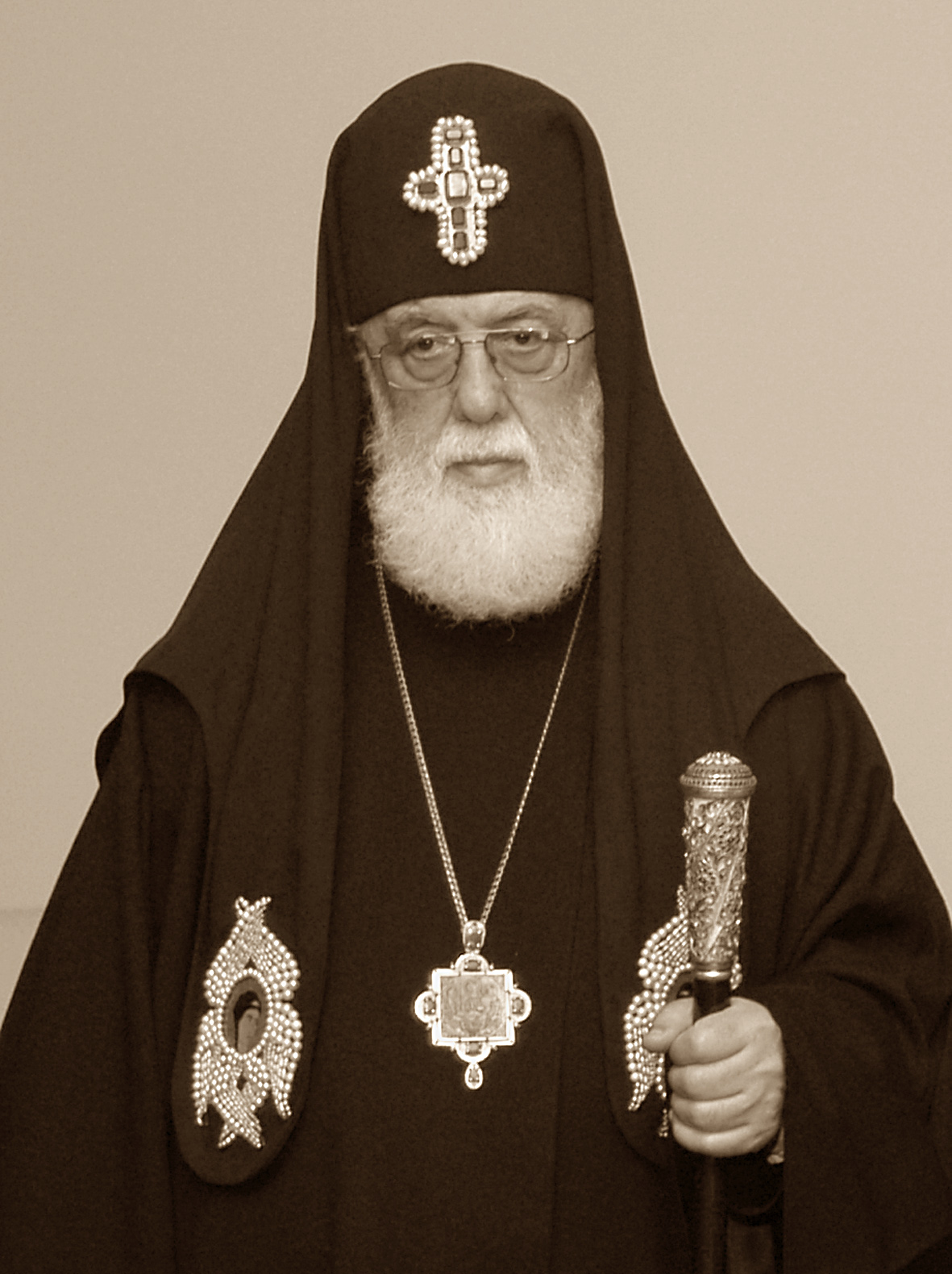
- Ilia II in 2004
- Native name: ილია II
- Church: Georgian Orthodox Church
- Installed: 25 December 1977
- Term ended: 17 March 2026
- Predecessor: David V
- Successor: Shio III
- Previous posts: Bishop of Batumi and Shemokmedi (1963–1967); Bishop of Sukhumi and Abkhazia (1967–1977)

Orders
- Ordination: 18 April 1957 (deacon) by Melchizedek III of Georgia; 10 May 1959 (priest) by Alexy I of Moscow
- Consecration: 25 August 1963 by Ephraim II of Georgia

Personal details
- Born: Irakli Gudushauri-Shiolashvili; 4 January 1933 Ordzhonikidze, Russian SFSR, Soviet Union
- Died: 17 March 2026 (aged 93) Tbilisi, Georgia
- Buried: Sioni Cathedral
- Denomination: Eastern Orthodox
- Profession: Theologian
- Education: Moscow Theological Academy
- Khelrtva: Ilia II's signature

Ilia II (Note: Georgian: ილია II, romanized: ilia II; also transcribed as Ilya or Elijah) (secular name Irakli Gudushauri-Shiolashvili; (Note: Georgian: ირაკლი ღუდუშაური-შიოლაშვილი) 4 January 1933 – 17 March 2026) was the Catholicos-Patriarch of All Georgia from 1977 until his death in 2026. He was the longest serving patriarch in the history of the Georgian Orthodox Church, which spans more than a millennium.

Born in Ordzhonikidze (modern-day Vladikavkaz, Russia), to a Georgian Orthodox family, he studied at the Moscow Theological Academy from 1956 to 1960. During that time he became a monk and was also ordained to the priesthood. Ilia served as bishop of Batumi and Shemokmedi from 1963 to 1967 and as bishop of Sukhumi and Abkhazia from 1967 to 1977. He also led the church's external relations department from 1964 to 1977. In that position, he worked to secure the recognition of the autocephaly of the Georgian Orthodox Church by other Eastern Orthodox churches. He was elected as Catholicos-Patriarch of All Georgia in 1977.

During his patriarchate, Ilia II led the growth and restoration of the Church in Georgia, especially after the fall of the Soviet Union. The Georgian Orthodox Church had a central role in cultural development during the early post-Soviet years, and an increased role in social welfare. Ilia II founded educational centers, expanded the church hierarchy, encouraged parish life, and opened hundreds of new churches and monasteries. He consistently polled as the most trusted public figure in Georgia up until his death. Considered a social conservative, he advocated for a constitutional monarchy in Georgia. Ilia II also obtained the recognition of the Church's autocephaly by the Ecumenical Patriarch of Constantinople in 1990, and worked to improve diplomatic relations between Russia and Georgia in the wake of the 2008 Russo-Georgian War. In 2010, he was appointed Metropolitan Bishop of Bichvinta and Tskhum-Abkhazia. He died in March 2026, at the age of 93.

== Early life and education ==
Ilia II was born Irakli Gudushauri-Shiolashvili on 4 January 1933 in Ordzhonikidze (modern-day Vladikavkaz, Russia) to Georgian parents. His father, Giorgi Shiolashvili (1883–1967), was from the village of Sno, and his mother, Natalia Kobaidze (1895–1962), from the village Sioni. The Gudushauri family was established by a close associate of the 5th-century Georgian king Vakhtang Gorgasali, and the Shiolashvili are a branch of that family, with a fortress honoured in their name in the Kazbegi Municipality.

When he was growing up, his parents provided refuge to clergymen who were in hiding from the Soviet government, and they had an influence on his worldview. His family were acquaintances of Callistratus, the Catholicos-Patriarch of All Georgia and head of the Georgian Orthodox Church. They had bought a house in Vladikavkaz in 1927, and the patriarch maintained contact with the Georgian Orthodox community in the city through his father. In 1947, his parents and some of their associates built an Orthodox church there. They also knew members of the local Muslim community, who also visited the family during that time.

In 1952, Irakli Gudushauri-Shiolashvili graduated from school no. 22 in Vladikavkaz and then attended the Moscow Theological Seminary, where he was recognized in his first year for his writing. After that he attended the Moscow Theological Academy from 1956 to 1960. During that time, he was tonsured as a monk with the blessing of the rector of the academy, as well as patriarchs Alexy I of Moscow and Melchizedek III of Georgia. The tonsure took place on 16 April 1957, and he took the name Ilia, after the prophet Elijah. In 1960, he graduated from the academy with a Candidate of Theology degree, and his thesis was titled History of the Iveron Monastery on Mount Athos.

== Priesthood and episcopate ==
Ilia was ordained as a hierodeacon on 18 April 1957 by Melchizedek III of Georgia at the Tbilisi Sioni Cathedral, and as a hieromonk on 10 May 1959 by Alexy I of Moscow at the church of St. Sergius of Radonezh, Trinity Lavra of St. Sergius. After his graduation from the Moscow Theological Academy, he was offered the opportunity to stay and continue scholarly work, but he spoke to then-head of the Georgian Orthodox Church, Ephraim II of Georgia, who advised him "follow your heart". Ilia decided to return to Georgia, where he worked at St. Nicholas Cathedral in Batumi and became its rector in December 1960. On 19 December 1960, he was elevated to the rank of hegumen, and on 16 September 1961 to the rank of archimandrite. His work in the region of Adjara contributed to the growth of Orthodoxy there.

He became a theologian, and also personally gathered evidence to support the restoration of the ancient autocephaly of the Georgian Orthodox Church. Ilia rose quickly through the church hierarchy, becoming a bishop at the age of thirty. On 25 August 1963, Ilia was chosen to be the bishop of Batumi and Shemokmedi and appointed a patriarchal vicar. His episcopal consecration took place with Ephraim II as principal consecrator. From 1964 to 1972, he was also the first rector of the Mtskheta Theological Seminary—the only clerical school in Georgia at that time. On 1 September 1967, he was transferred from Batumi to the eparchy of Sukhumi and Abkhazia. On 17 May 1969, he was appointed a metropolitan. Ilia spoke in Georgian, Church Slavonic, Abkhaz, and Greek during the Divine Liturgy.

Ilia was the head of the Department of External Relations in the Georgian Orthodox Church from 1964 to 1977, during which time he worked towards securing the recognition of the autocephaly of the Church in the Orthodox world. The Georgian Orthodox Church had been recognized as an autocephalous church by the Russian Orthodox Church in 1943, but this was not recognized elsewhere at the time. In 1964, he raised the issue with the Ecumenical Patriarch of Constantinople during the Third Pan-Orthodox Conference, and stormed out after other participants disagreed with him. Ilia attended other international events, such as meetings of the World Council of Churches (1970) and the Christian Peace Conference (1974 and 1975), and met with the president and prime minister of India. He highly valued the Georgian monks at Mount Athos, and his first published work (1966) was about Venerable Georgy Mt'ats'mindeli (the Athonite), one of the most important saints of the Georgian Orthodox Church.

After the death of Ephraim II on 7 April 1972, Ilia was widely supported by Georgian clergy and laymen to become his successor as head of the Georgian Orthodox Church, but his appointment was rejected by Vladimir A. Kuroyedov of the Council for Religious Affairs.

== Patriarchate ==
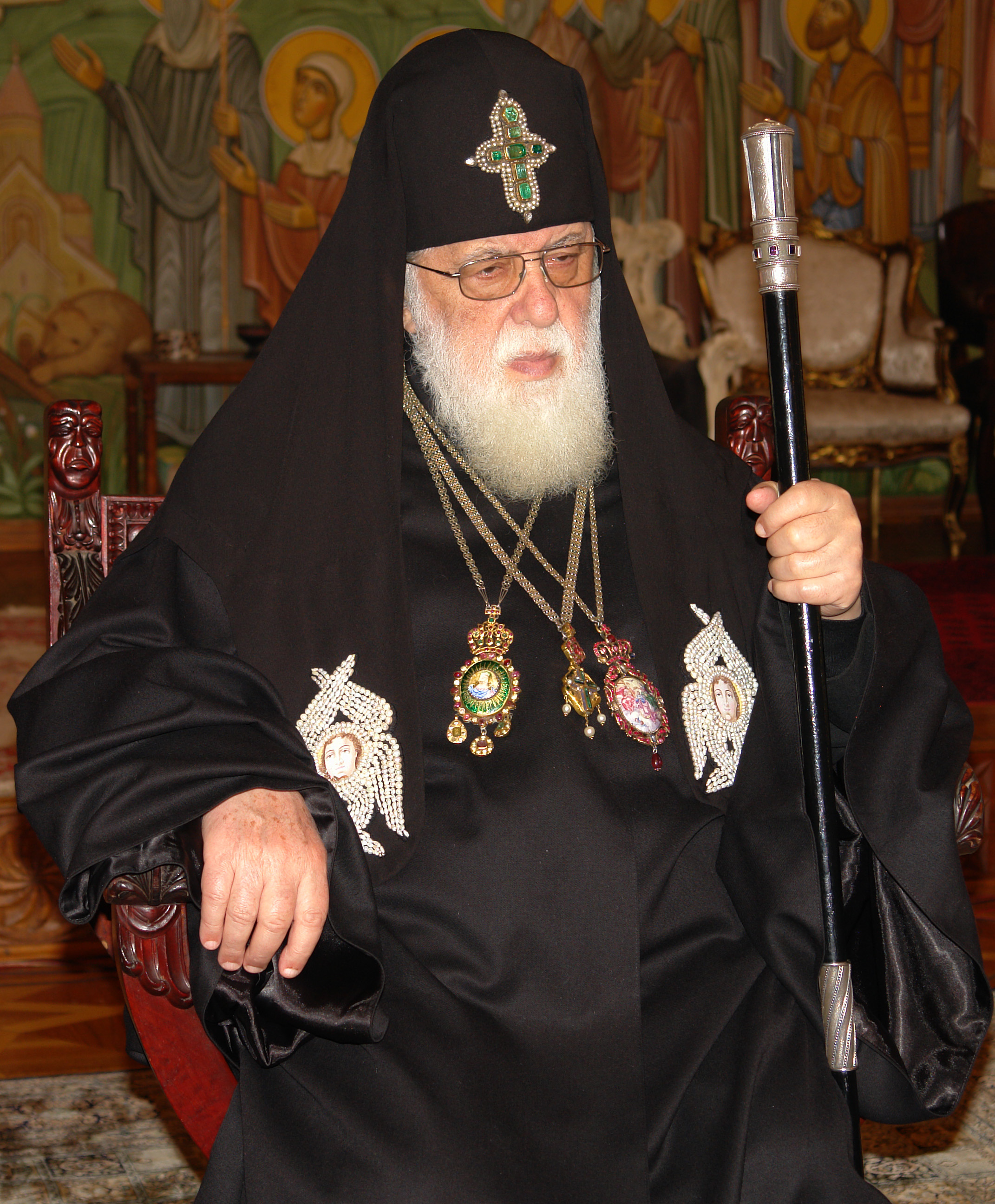
Ilia II as patriarch, 21 December 2007.

After the death of the controversial patriarch David V, on 9 November 1977 Ilia was elected locum tenens of the patriarchal throne by majority vote in the Holy Synod of the Georgian Orthodox Church. Ilia II was elected the new Catholicos-Patriarch of All Georgia on 23 December, and was enthroned in a ceremony on 25 December 1977 at the Svetitskhoveli Cathedral.

During his patriarchate, the Orthodox Church went from having no power in Soviet Georgia to taking a central role in Georgian cultural development in the immediate post-Soviet years. The new patriarch began a course of reforms. He started by expanding the church hierarchy (which had 15 dioceses, five of which were vacant). In 1978, when the church celebrated its 1500th anniversary, Ilia consecrated four new bishops. By January 1979, the number of parishes expanded from 34 to 46. At the same time, he took measures to increase the knowledge of Orthodox teachings, and to expand the flock, which was almost non-existent. The Tbilisi Spiritual Academy was opened in October 1988 as a companion to the seminary in Mtskheta. A publishing department was established to print calendars and a journal. The patriarch oversaw the publication of a linguistically updated, modern Georgian version of the Bible, which was printed in 1989. Ilia II also pushed the government to register existing parishes and monasteries, while also reclaiming historic buildings of the Church, some of which had been used for other purposes by the Soviet state.

On 9 April 1989, the patriarch joined the people demonstrating in Tbilisi against the Soviet rule, although he fruitlessly urged the protesters to withdraw to the nearby Kashveti Church to avoid the bloodshed. This peaceful demonstration was dispersed by the Soviet troops, leaving behind 22 dead and hundreds injured. The presence of Ilia II at the protests, his conduct of the nationalist leader Merab Kostava's funeral in October 1989, and his opening of the Georgian National Convention in May 1990 represented the unity between the Church and the Georgian independence movement. During the civil war in Georgia in the 1990s, he called the rival parties to find a peaceful solution to the crisis and hosted negotiations. On 14 October 2002, the then-president of Georgia Eduard Shevardnadze and Ilia II signed a concordat whereby the Georgian Orthodox Church was granted a number of privileges, in accordance with Article 9 of the Constitution of Georgia, which recognizes the Orthodox Church as the first among equals when it comes to religion in Georgia. Holders of the office of patriarch were given legal immunity.

In the post-Soviet years, his patriarchate expanded the Church's role in social welfare, and the Church underwent a massive expansion. As of 2009, the Church had expanded to have 39 hierarchs and dioceses, with 1,500 churches and 170 monasteries, served by a total of 3,200 clergymen. In 2002, with the patriarch's blessing, regimental chaplains were restored in the Defence Forces of Georgia, which according to him "will contribute significantly to the spiritual uplifting of military personnel." Another significant event of his patriarchate was the construction of the Holy Trinity Cathedral of Tbilisi from 1995 to 2004—which became the largest in Georgia and one of the largest Orthodox cathedrals in the world. Ilia II was joined by hierarchs from many other Orthodox churches during the consecration of the new cathedral on 23 November 2004. In 2006, the Church founded the Saint Andrew the First-Called Georgian University of the Patriarchate of Georgia. Ilia II also devoted attention to restoring ties with the Georgian monasteries abroad, like Iveron Monastery on Mount Athos and the Monastery of the Cross in Jerusalem. He explored the possibility of restoring the Monastery of the Cross to the Georgian Church, as it has been under the Greek Orthodox Patriarchate of Jerusalem.

In 2010, by the decision of the Holy Synod, Ilia II was appointed Metropolitan Bishop of Bichvinta and Tskhum-Abkhazia. Accordingly, he was officially styled as "Catholicos-Patriarch of All Georgia, the Archbishop of Mtskheta-Tbilisi and Metropolitan Bishop of Bichvinta and Tskhum-Abkhazia".

=== Initiative to increase the birth rate ===
In December 2007, concerned with Georgia's declining birth rate, Ilia II offered to personally baptize any child born to a family that already has at least two children, as long as the new child was to be born after his announcement. He conducted mass baptism ceremonies four times a year. The patriarch's initiative contributed to a national baby boom, and in the following year of 2008, Georgia recorded the highest number of births in a decade, as being baptized by the Patriarch is a considerable honour among adherents of the Orthodox Church. Ilia II had more than 47,000 godchildren.

=== Relations with other churches ===
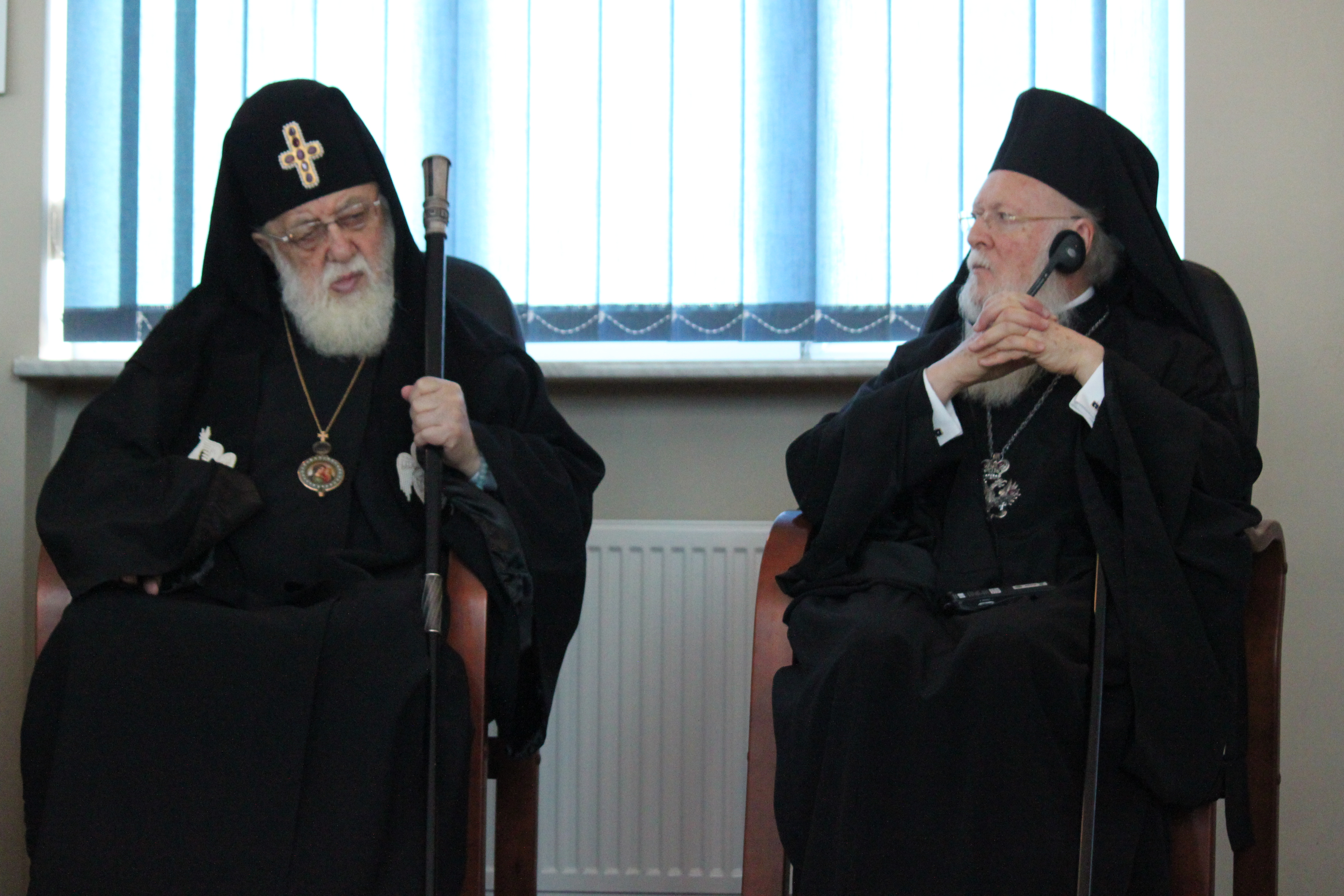
Ilia II (left) with Ecumenical Patriarch Bartholomew I of Constantinople, 14 December 2012

The growing role of the Georgian Orthodox Church under Ilia II was acknowledged by the World Council of Churches. He was one of the presidents of the WCC from 1979 to 1983. On 6 June 1980, Ilia II visited Rome and met Pope John Paul II, becoming the first Georgian patriarch to meet the head of the Catholic Church. On 4 March 1990, the Georgian Orthodox Church received the recognition of its autocephaly during a meeting between Demetrios I of Constantinople and Ilia II. He continued to have good relations with the Ecumenical Patriarchate during his tenure, marked by mutual visits.

Later on, the Church turned against ecumenism. In the early years of Georgia's independence, Protestant "sects" and the Catholic Church in Georgia were accused by the Georgian Orthodox Church of using their wealth to buy support among Georgians. Ilia II withdrew the Georgian Orthodox Church from the WCC on 20 May 1997, which he did in part due to the influence of conservative Georgian clerics and monks. After some clerics threatened a schism over the patriarch's ecumenism, he hastily convened the Holy Synod to hold a vote on the matter. Although he met Pope John Paul II again during the latter's visit to Georgia in November 1999, the Church rejected interfaith agreements with the Vatican in September 2003.

Relations with the Russian Orthodox Church became strained during his tenure, but the Georgian Church maintained contact with the Moscow Patriarchate and the Russian government, including after the severing of diplomatic relations between the two countries in 2008, for which he faced some criticism in Georgia. He and the Church were encouraged by President Mikheil Saakashvili to engage in diplomacy and to lay the foundation for the restoration of political dialogue with Russia. Ilia II considered Russians and Georgians as brotherly Orthodox peoples. As a former bishop of Sukhumi and Abkhazia, he made statements that the separatist territory of Abkhazia is a part of Georgia, and also that the Church opposed any separatism in Georgia.

In April 2008, he expressed regret at the low state of relations between Russia and Georgia. During the August 2008 Russo-Georgian War, Ilia II appealed to the Russian political leadership and the church, expressing concerns that "the Orthodox Russians were bombing Orthodox Georgians". He also helped retrieve the bodies of deceased Georgian soldiers and civilians. Ilia II also blessed the 1 September 2008 "Stop Russia" demonstrations, in which tens of thousands organized human chains across Georgia.

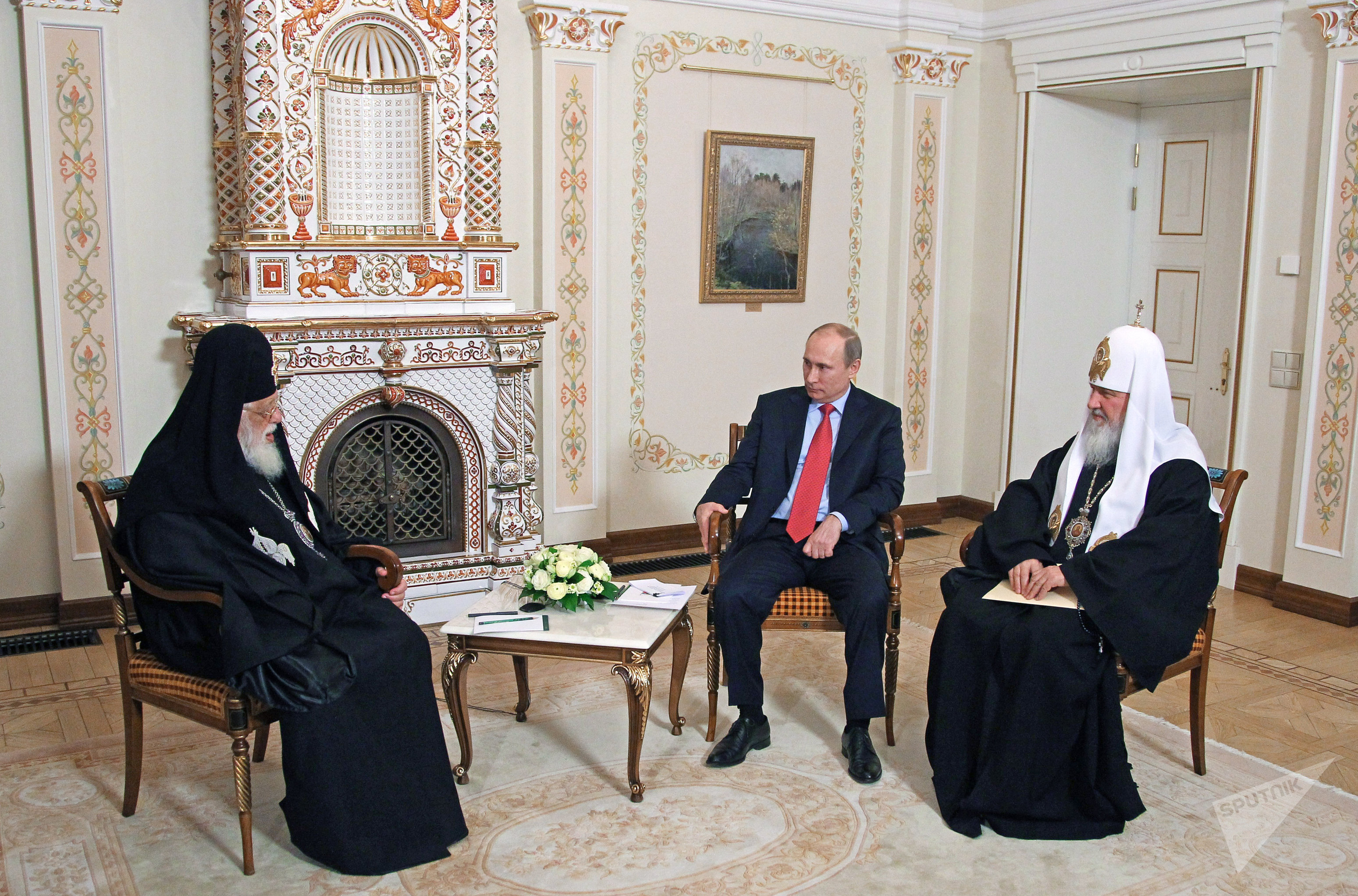
Ilia II meets Russian President Vladimir Putin and Patriarch Kirill of Moscow, 23 January 2013.

In December 2008, Ilia II visited Moscow to participate in the funeral service of Russia's Patriarch Alexy II. On 9 December 2008, he met Russia's President Dmitry Medvedev, which was the first high-level official contact between the two countries since the August war. Later, Ilia II announced that he had some "positive agreements" with Medvedev which needed "careful and diplomatic" follow-up by the politicians. United States Ambassador John F. Tefft described Ilia II as an "astute diplomat" who "expressed his desire to serve a positive role in normalizing and stabilizing relations with Russia."

On a visit to Russia in January 2013, Ilia II said "the brotherly relations between our Churches were the only path that connected our governments and people... those problems which exist between our governments will be solved positively." The Russian Church recognized the canonical jurisdiction of the Georgian Church over Abkhazia and South Ossetia despite the political recognition of the separatist entities by the Russian government. In turn, the Georgian Church recognized Russian jurisdiction over Ukraine, Moldova, and Estonia. The Church under Ilia II did not take a position on the 2014–2015 Ukraine crisis, and he again said in 2015 that Russia and Georgia are brotherly Orthodox nations whose relations must be restored.

During the Moscow–Constantinople schism over jurisdiction in Ukraine, Ilia II did not recognize the Orthodox Church of Ukraine (OCU), founded in 2018 and recognized as autocephalous by Ecumenical Patriarch Bartholomew I of Constantinople. In October 2018, Ilia II met with Ukrainian MP Andriy Parubiy in Tbilisi, who then claimed that the patriarch gave his support for the OCU, but the Georgian Church issued a statement rejecting his claim that Ilia II recognized the new church. In April 2019, a statement was issued indicating that the Georgian Patriarchate was waiting for decisions to be made by other churches, noting that the OCU was only recognized by three other Orthodox churches at the time.

In March 2023, Ilia II wrote a letter to Ecumenical Patriarch Bartholomew I expressing "great heartache" over the ongoing Russo-Ukrainian war and expressing his concern over the non-renewal of the right of the Ukrainian Orthodox Church (UOC), which is subordinate to the Moscow Patriarchate and is not recognized by Bartholomew, to use the Kyiv Pechersk Lavra monastery. Ilia's statement prompted criticism in Georgia, where it was interpreted by some as support for the Moscow Patriarchate and Russia.

== Death and legacy ==
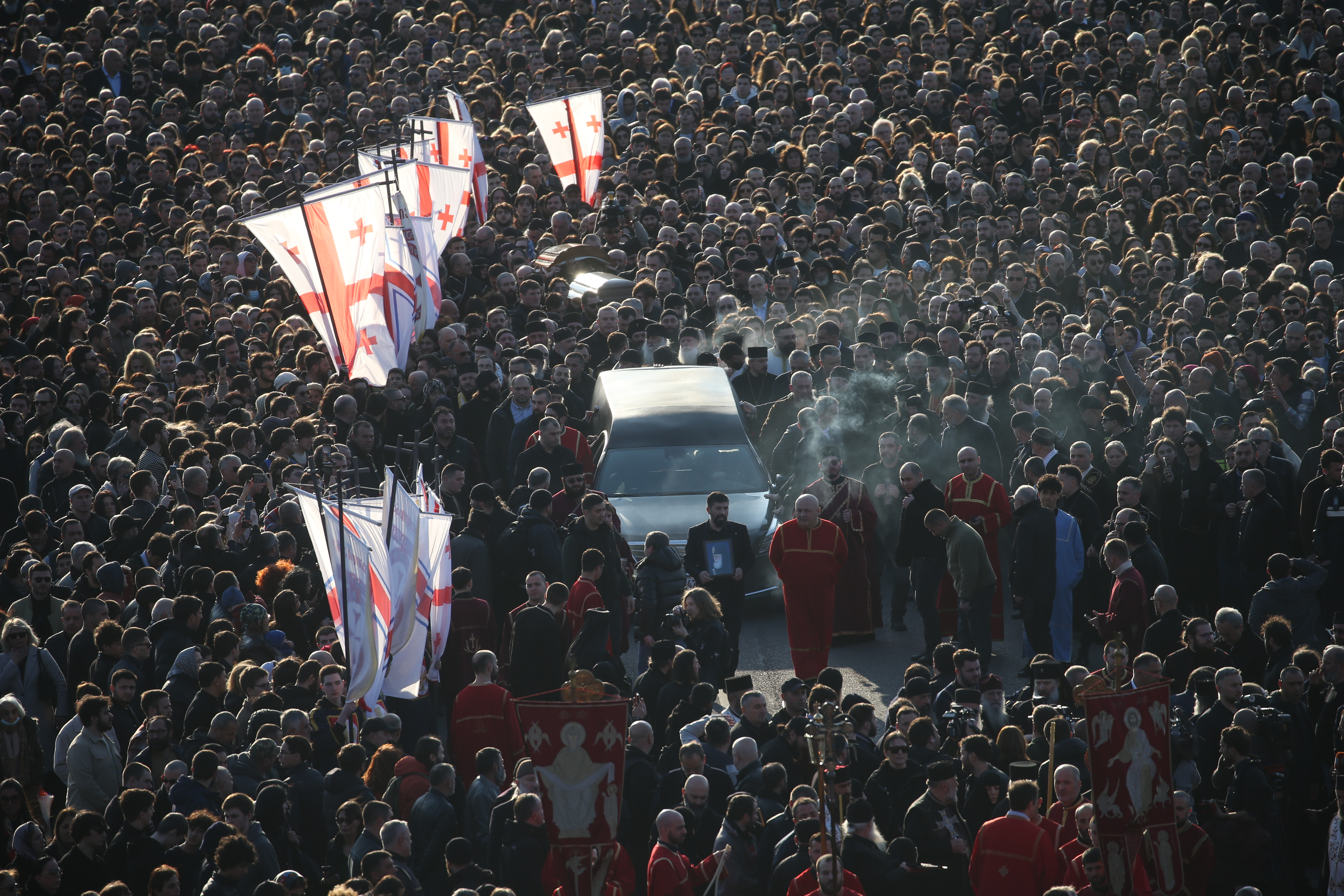
The state funeral procession of Catholicos-Patriarch Ilia II through the streets of Tbilisi, Georgia.

Ilia died in Tbilisi on 17 March 2026, at the age of 93, after a brief hospitalisation earlier that day for gastrointestinal bleeding. He was the longest serving patriarch in the 1,500-year history of the Georgian Orthodox Church.

Metropolitan Shio Mujiri assumed the role of locum tenens of the patriarchal throne after his death, pending the election of a new patriarch. This was confirmed by the Holy Synod of the Church that convened on 18 March. The Holy Synod also stated that a funeral commission will be established, to hold the funeral of Ilia II on 22 March. The government of Georgia announced a period of national mourning. Tens of thousands of people attended the procession of his coffin to the Holy Trinity Cathedral, Tbilisi. On 22 March, the funeral service took place at the cathedral. It was attended by Ecumenical Patriarch Bartholomew I and the heads of four other Orthodox Churches, the president and prime minister of Georgia, the speaker of parliament, the head of the Georgian Dream party, and several international diplomatic and religious delegations. Afterward, a procession then moved him to be laid to rest at the Sioni Cathedral, where he was buried. Hundreds of thousands of people lined the path leading to the cathedral.

== Views ==
=== Western world ===
Georgia underwent significant social and political change during the patriarchate of Ilia II. The Church under the leadership of Ilia II spoke out against the "Western" or "European" concept of human rights, which he viewed as having been removed from a religious context, and about their desire to put limits on civil rights. The criticism was in response to the movement of the Georgian government towards aligning with European civil and human rights law, particularly since the 2003 Rose Revolution.

The patriarch's view that the Western world is often morally incompatible with Orthodoxy has been adopted by many clerics in the Georgian Orthodox Church. In 1997, the same year the Georgian Church left the World Council of Churches, the Tbilisi Theological Academy ceased Western rites and exchange programs by foreign lecturers. Ilia II gave an award to the bishop whose eparchy published an anti-Western journal, Qvakuthedi, which believed Russia to be a natural ally of Georgia through Orthodoxy, even after the 2008 war, which it called "God's blessing to enter under the patronage of Russia." The Georgian Church also associated the Ecumenical Patriarchate of Constantinople with the West and liberalism, in contrast to the Russian Church, with which it was more ideologically aligned, and recognized the latter's jurisdiction in Ukraine, Moldova, and Estonia. Despite this, Ilia II stated in 2014 and 2015 that he supported European Union membership for Georgia, while hoping to protect Georgian cultural traditions. In 2014, European Union commissioner Štefan Füle met Ilia II and assured him that the EU does not seek to change Georgian tradition.

=== Liberalism ===
In his sermons, Ilia II condemned homosexuality and abortion, demanded television be censored to remove sexual content, denounced school textbooks for "insufficient patriotism", lectured against what he called "extreme liberalism", and warned against "pseudo-culture" from abroad. He opposed attempts to give other Christian denominations equal status under Georgian law and condemned international educational exchanges and working abroad as "unpatriotic".

=== Death penalty ===
Ilia II regularly visited correctional institutions and conversed with inmates. In 1990, he sent a letter to Soviet President Mikhail Gorbachev asking him to abolish the death penalty and find an alternative, calling for mercy towards those who acknowledged their errors, repented, and wanted to reform their lives. Prayer rooms have been established at almost every detention facility in Georgia, and at the insistence of Ilia II, Orthodox clergy have been given permission to not only visit inmates but to petition for their pardon.

=== Constitutional monarchy ===
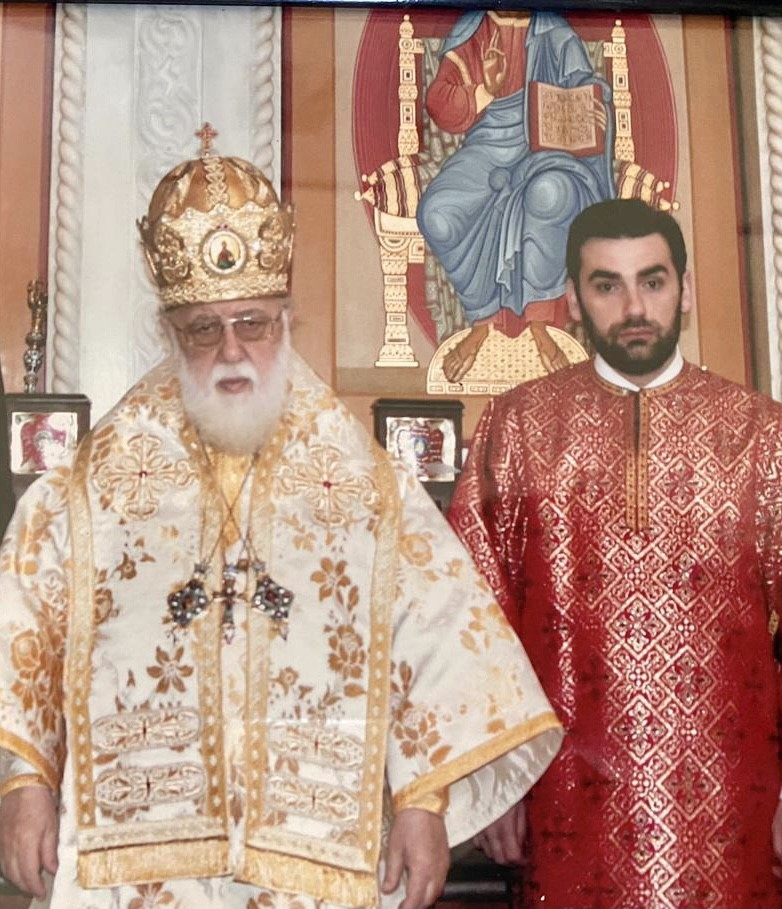
Patriarch Ilia II and David Bagrationi Mukhrani

Ilia II had a reputation as a proponent of constitutional monarchy as a form of government for Georgia. On 7 October 2007, he publicly called in a sermon for consideration of establishing a constitutional monarchy under the Bagrationi dynasty (the Russian Empire had dispossessed of the Georgian crown early in the 19th century). The call coincided with rising confrontation between the government of President Mikheil Saakashvili and the opposition, many members of which welcomed the patriarch's proposal. Ilia II favored the ancient house of Prince David Bagration of Mukhrani and initiated a marriage between this genealogically senior royal line and the Gruzinsky branch. He later personally baptized the offspring of this union, Prince Giorgi Bagration Mukhrani, his godson, styling him "Prince of Georgia" in a ceremony including the whole Synod. In June 2018, he gave an official blessing and performed the wedding ceremony for Prince Juan de Bagration-Mukhrani and Kristine Dzidziguri at Svetitskhoveli Cathedral.

=== Nationalism ===
Illia II was considered a proponent of Georgian nationalism. In 1987, a prominent 19th century Georgian nationalist Ilia Chavchavadze was canonized by the Georgian Orthodox Church. Since 1980, Illia II elaborated the notion of "heavenly Georgia", an otherworldly Georgia where Orthodox Christian Georgians could acquire an eternal place in paradise. This, as well as canonization of Chavchavadze, served as a basis for this religious-nationalist discourse. The notion of the "heavenly Georgia" drew on the biblical notion of the "Heavenly Jerusalem". He also believed that Georgian national identity must include Christian Orthodoxy.

=== Georgian politics ===
Ilia II had a close alliance with Georgian president Eduard Shevardnadze's government. The political influence of the Georgian Orthodox Church grew during this time, which was symbolized by the baptism of Shevardnadze, a former Communist leader, by Ilia II in 1992.

In November 2024, the Georgian Orthodox Church released a statement signed by Ilia II congratulating the socially conservative governing party Georgian Dream on its victory in a parliamentary election reportedly marred by fraud. Amid the 2024–2026 Georgian protests, in December 2024, he called for dialogue and that everyone should denounce violence.

=== Homosexuality ===
In 2013, Ilia II described homosexuality as a "disease". He urged the Georgian authorities to stop a gay rights rally planned for Tbilisi on 17 May 2013 to mark International Day Against Homophobia, as "an insult" to Georgian tradition. Following his comments, thousands of Georgians, led by Georgian Orthodox priests, took to the streets of Tbilisi to protest the gay rights rally. Due to escalating violence against the rally's participants, the rally had to be abandoned, and the activists were driven in a bus to safety by the police. In his response, Ilia II said he did not endorse violence.

== Approval ratings ==
Ilia II was called "the most trusted man in Georgia" by CNN in 2010, and had the highest favourability rating among Georgian politicians (94%), according to a November 2013 National Democratic Institute for International Affairs poll. Similarly, Ilia II had 91% favorability rating in 2023, far surpassing all of the country's contemporary political leaders. However, trust in the church overall has been declining in recent years after peaking in the early 2000s, with the majority no longer able to trust the church fully, accompanied by a multi-fold increase in ambivalence towards the church. Actual church attendance has also been generally low.

== Awards and recognition ==
As patriarch, he received the highest Church awards from the Patriarchs of the Orthodox Churches of Antioch, Jerusalem, Alexandria, Russia, Greece, Bulgaria, and Romania. He was also awarded an Honorary Doctorate of Theology from several institutions, including St. Tikhon's Orthodox Theological Seminary, the New York Theological Academy, and Tbilisi State University. In 2003, he was awarded the Ilia Medal, "for special contribution to Georgian culture and spirituality". In 2008, Ilia II was awarded the first David Guramishvili Prize. He was also an honorary member of the Georgian Academy of Sciences.

State awards that he received include Russia's Order of Friendship of Peoples (1993), Georgia's Order of David the Builder (1997), Azerbaijan's Order of Glory (2005), and Ukraine's Order of Prince Yaroslav the Wise (2008).

== See also ==
- List of heads of the Georgian Orthodox Church

== Notes ==
Eastern Orthodox Church titles
| Preceded by Roman Petriashvili | Bishop of Sukhumi and Abkhazia; 1967–1977 | Succeeded by Nikoloz Makharadze |
| Preceded by David V | Catholicos-Patriarch of All Georgia; 1977–2026 | Succeeded by Shio III |
