= David V (disambiguation) =

David V was King of Georgia in the 12th century.

David V may also refer to:

- David V, Catholicos-Patriarch of Georgia
- David V, numbering sometimes used for David IV Strathbogie, titular Earl of Atholl (died 1369)
- David V Ghorganian, Catholicos of Armenia (1801–1804)
- a Caucasian Albanian Catholicos, see List of Caucasian Albanian catholicoi
