= St. Andrews University (disambiguation) =

St. Andrews University may refer to:

- St. Andrews University (Japan)
- St. Andrews University (North Carolina)
- Saint Andrew the First-Called Georgian University of the Patriarchate of Georgia, in Tbilisi, Georgia
- University of St Andrews, in Scotland

== See also ==
- Andrews University
- Andrew College
