= Eparchy of Bichvinta and Tskhum-Abkhazia =

Georgian Orthodox Church diocese

- Coat of Arms of Georgian Apostolic Autocephalous Orthodox Church

Location
- Territory: North-western parts of Georgia
- Headquarters: Sukhumi, Abkhazia, Georgia

Information
- Denomination: Eastern Orthodox
- Sui iuris church: Georgian Orthodox Church
- Established: 1917
- Language: Georgian

Current leadership
- Bishop: Shio III

Map

The Eparchy of Bichvinta and Tskhum-Abkhazia (Georgian: ბიჭვინთისა და ცხუმ აფხაზეთის ეპარქია) is an eparchy (diocese) of the Georgian Orthodox Church with its seat in Sokhumi (Tskhumi), Georgia. It has jurisdiction over Districts of Sukhumi, Ochamchire, Gali, Gudauta, Gulripshi and Gagra.

== Heads ==
Picture	Name	Time
Georgian Orthodox Eparchy of Bichvinta and Tskhum-Abkhazia
	Ambrosius Khelaia	October 28, 1919 – October 14, 1921
	Ioanne Marghishvili	October 15, 1921 – April 7, 1925
	Christophorus Tsitskishvili	April 7, 1925 – June 21, 1927
	Ephraim Sidamonidze	June – October 7, 1927
	Melchizedek Pkhaladze	October 17, 1927 – March 24, 1928
	Pavle Japaridze	March 26, 1928 – February 1929
	Varlaam Makharadze	February 12, 1929 – January 2, 1935
	Melchizedek Pkhaladze	January 2, 1935 – April 30, 1944
	Anton Gigineishvili	March 30, 1952 – November 24, 1956
	Leonid Zhvania	February 15, 1957 – December 14, 1964
	Roman Petriashvili	February 21, 1965 – August 28, 1967
	Ilia Shiolashvili	September 1, 1967 – December 23, 1977
	Nikoloz Makharadze	February 19, 1978 – September 9, 1981
	David Chkadua	September 28, 1981 – October 7, 1992
	Daniel Datuashvili	October 17, 1992 – December 21, 2010
	Ilia Shiolashvili	December 21, 2010 – March 17, 2026
	Shio Mujiri	May 11, 2026 – present
