= Shio III of Georgia =

Catholicos-Patriarch of Georgia (born 1969)

His Holiness and Beatitude Shio III
- Catholicos-Patriarch of All Georgia, Archbishop of Mtskheta-Tbilisi and Metropolitan Bishop of Bichvinta and Tskhum-Abkhazia
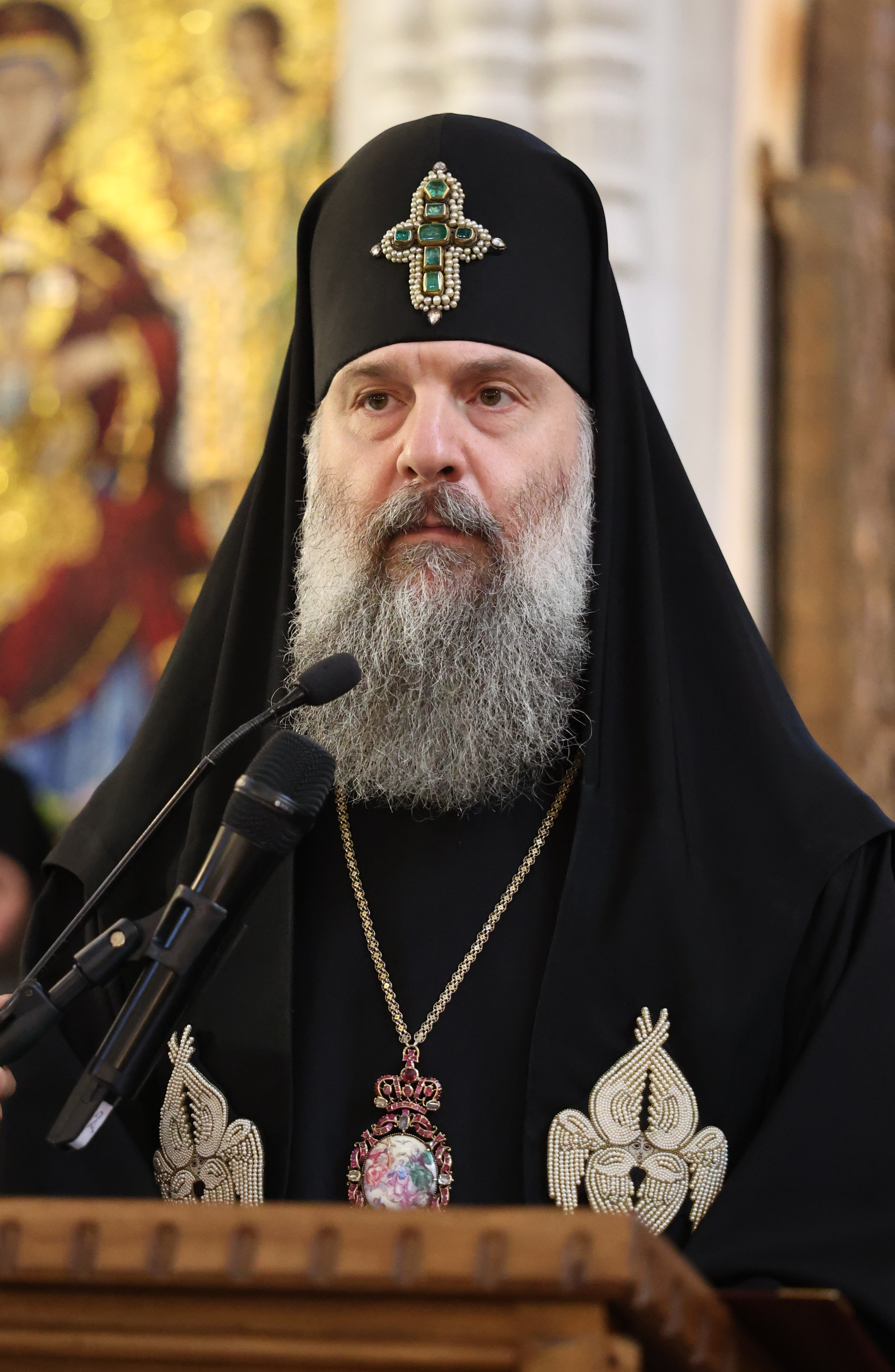
- Shio III in 2026
- Native name: შიო III
- Church: Georgian Orthodox Church
- Installed: 12 May 2026
- Predecessor: Ilia II
- Previous posts: Bishop of Australia and New Zealand (2010–2026); Bishop of Senaki and Chkhorotskuri (2003–2026)

Orders
- Ordination: 1995 (deacon); 1996 (priest)
- Consecration: 2003

Personal details
- Born: Elizbar Mujiri; 1 February 1969 (age 57) Tbilisi, Georgian SSR, Soviet Union
- Khelrtva

Shio III (Note: Georgian: შიო III) (secular name Elizbar Mujiri; (Note: Georgian: ელიზბარ მუჯირი) born 1 February 1969) is the Catholicos-Patriarch of All Georgia. He was previously the bishop of Senaki and Chkhorotsku from 2003 to 2026 and locum tenens of the Patriarchal Throne from 2017 to 2026.

Born in Tbilisi, Soviet Georgia, he studied at the Moscow Theological Academy and Saint Tikhon's Orthodox University. He became a monk in 1993 and was also ordained to the priesthood in 1996. In 2003, Mujiri was made the bishop of the new eparchy of Senaki and Chkhorotsku, and was also placed in charge of parishes in Australia and New Zealand in 2009. In 2017 he was appointed locum tenens of the Patriarchal Throne by Ilia II of Georgia. He became the temporary leader of the Georgian Orthodox Church after the death of Ilia II in 2026 and was later elected as patriarch.

== Education and early career ==
Born Elizbar Mujiri (ელიზბარ მუჯირი) on 1 February 1969 in Tbilisi, then the capital of Soviet Georgia, Mujiri Studied in the 53rd public school of Tbilisi and was trained as a cellist at the Tbilisi State Conservatoire, which he graduated from in 1991. His father, Teimuraz Mujiri, was an archaeologist, while his mother, Nana Kurdiani, was a doctor of philology. His grandparents were physicians.

Mujiri received his theological education at the Batumi Theological Seminary in Georgia and further, in Russia, at the Moscow Theological Academy and Saint Tikhon's Orthodox University, from which he received a Doctor of Divinity degree in 2015.

Elizbar Mujiri was tonsured a monk under the name of Shio in 1993. He was ordained a hierodeacon in 1995 and a hieromonk of the Georgian Orthodox Church in 1996. He was a father superior at the Kldisubani church of Saint George and then at the Narikala church of Saint Nicholas, both in Tbilisi, between 1997 and 2001 when he was moved to lead St. George parish church in Moscow, serving a local Georgian diaspora community.

== Bishop ==
On 18 August 2003, Shio was appointed to the newly created Georgian Orthodox eparchy of Senaki and Chkhorotsku with a bishops rank. The eparchy was carved out of parts of the Chqondidi and Poti-Senaki bishoprics in the territory of the Samegrelo region. As of 2017, the eparchy operated 39 churches and monasteries. Bishop Shio was additionally placed in charge of the Georgian parishes in Australia and New Zealand on 30 April 2009 and elevated to the rank of a metropolitan on 2 August 2010. He has a seat in the Holy Synod of the Georgian Orthodox Church and is, also, a member of its Canonization Commission.

According to the Georgian media outlets, Bishop Shio was a childhood friend of the President of Georgia Giorgi Margvelashvili, a commentator and activist Irakli Kakabadze, and businessman Levan Vasadze. The latter is known for his conservative views and anti-Western rhetoric and has presided, since 2013, over the board of trustees of the government-sponsored Georgian Demographic Revival Fund of which Shio is also a member.

== Patriarchal locum tenens ==
On 23 November 2017, Saint George's Day, the leader of the Georgian Orthodox Church, Catholicos Patriarch Ilia II announced an appointment of Shio as the patriarchal locum tenens, that is a church official who would act as a temporary head of the Georgian Orthodox Church for 40 days after the incumbent Patriarch died, until the Holy Synod elected a new Patriarch. The decree, drafted by Ilia II with his own hand, came amid the ongoing internal tensions within the church leadership, widely publicized in the aftermath of the "cyanide case", in which a Georgian Orthodox priest was arrested and ruled guilty on charges of plotting to murder the Patriarch's personal secretary and adviser with cyanide earlier that year. The incumbent patriarch's decision to name his locum in his own lifetime came to many Georgians as a surprise; the Georgian media suggested this might indicate Ilia II's support for Shio's candidacy as a future patriarch.

After a meeting of the Holy Synod on 2 November 2023, he called for peace in Ukraine, the Middle East, and the whole world.

On 17 March 2026, Metropolitan Shio officially became patriarchal locum tenens following the death of Ilia II. This was confirmed by the Holy Synod of the Georgian Orthodox Church when it convened on 18 March. Because of his previous appointment, Metropolitan Shio was widely seen as the front-runner to succeed Ilia II as patriarch.

== Patriarchate ==
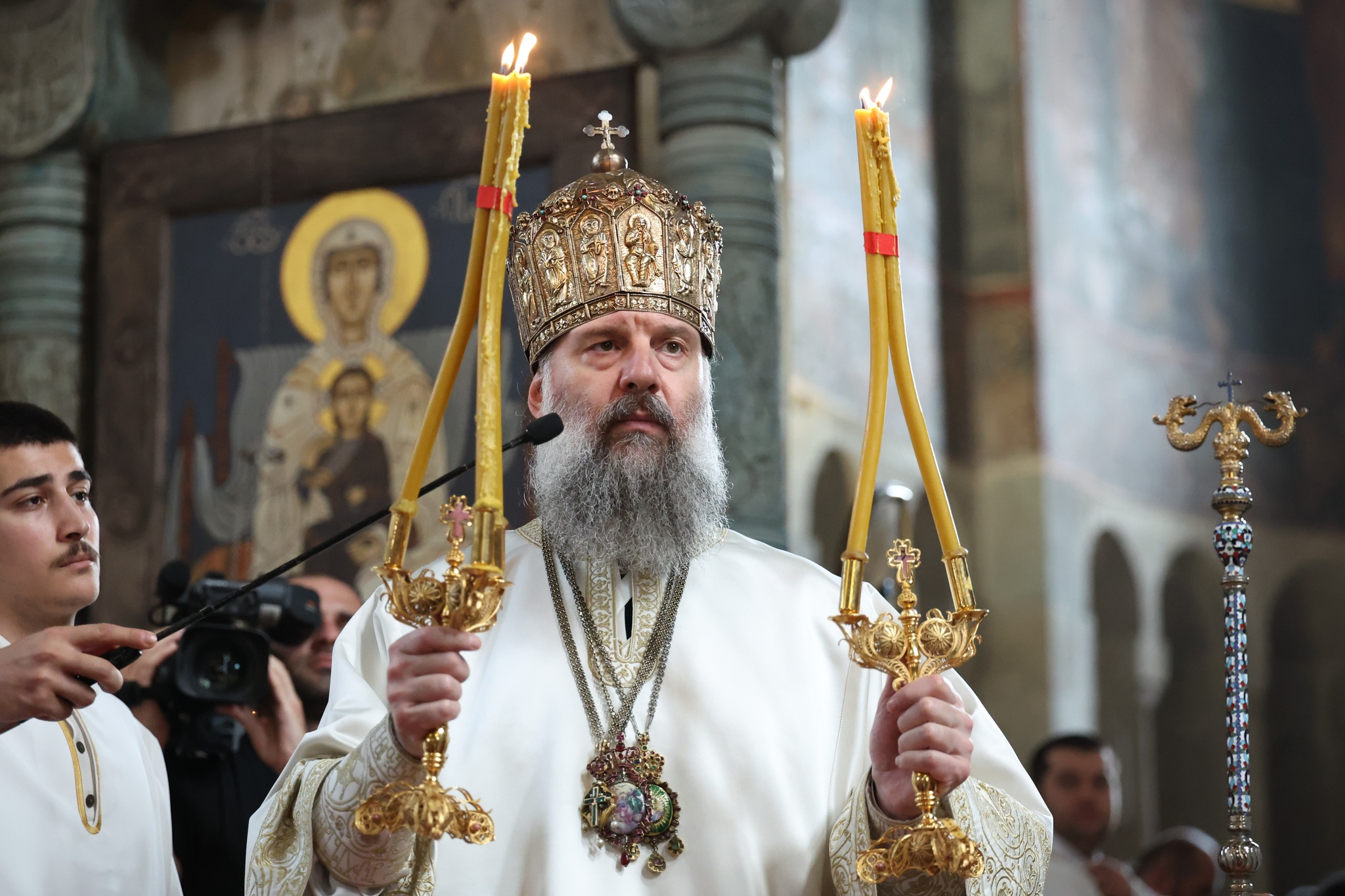
Shio III during enthronement ceremony.

On 11 May 2026, Shio was elected as the Catholicos-Patriarch of All Georgia in a vote by the Holy Synod of the Georgian Orthodox Church, He received 22 votes from the 39 person Synod. Shio was enthroned in Svetitskhoveli Cathedral on 12 May. In his first sermon, delivered during his enthronement, he pledged to continue the legacy of his predecessor. Shio spoke of the church's role in addressing contemporary social and social challenges, and emphasized faith, tradition, and national responsibility that the Georgian youth must uphold.

== Views ==
Shio is associated with socially conservative positions within the Georgian Orthodox Church. During the Church's "Family Purity Day" events, he described the family as a divinely created institution and said that family values were under threat. In 2019, he linked the defense of family to opposition to abortion and what he called "LGBT ideology".

Commentators have described Metropolitan Shio as a conservative figure within debates over the Church’s political orientation. In 2026, the Carnegie Endowment for International Peace described him as “widely regarded” as a radical conservative and as supportive of closer relations with the Russian Orthodox Church. Archbishop Zenon Iarajuli has described Shio as "dangerous", and preferred by both Russia and Georgian authorities. Shio has denied allegations of links to Moscow, describing them as slander.

=== Treatment of minorities ===
After a violent mob, including several Orthodox priests, attacked and injured numerous participants of Tbilisi Pride march, as well as journalists, on July 5, 2021, Mujiri did not condemn the violence, but suggested that to prevent further violence, Georgia should "outlaw insulting religious and national feelings".

== See also ==
- List of heads of the Georgian Orthodox Church
- Shio II of Georgia
- Abortion in Georgia (country)
