= Tbilisi Sioni Cathedral =

Orthodox Christian cathedral in Tbilisi, Georgia

Cathedral of Saint Mary of Zion სიონის ღვთისმშობლის მიძინების ტაძარი
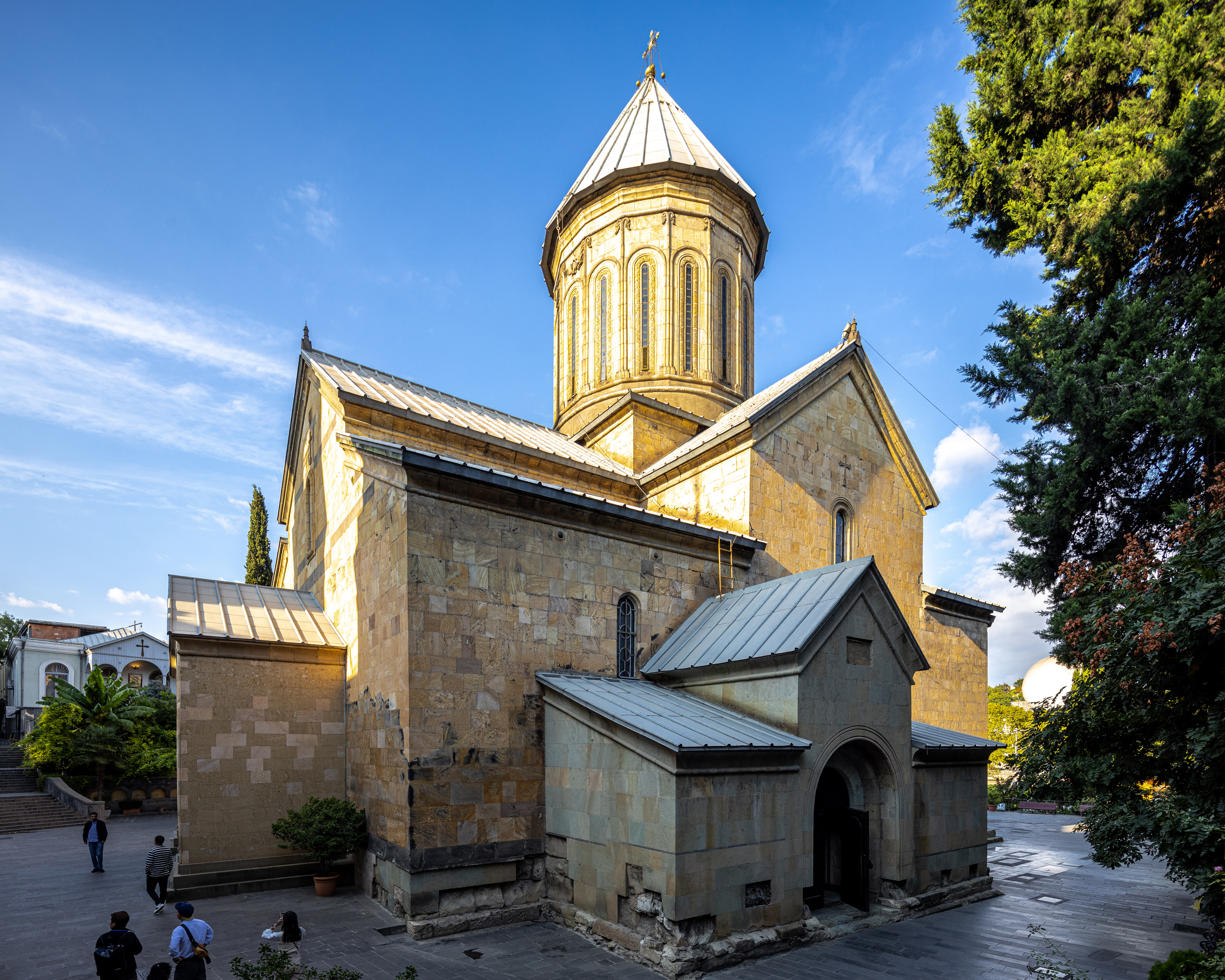
- Sioni Cathedral in September 2023

- Location within Tbilisi Location within Georgia

Religion
- Affiliation: Georgian Orthodox Church

Location
- Location: 4 Sioni Street, Tbilisi, Georgia
- Coordinates: 41.6914°N 44.8075°E

Architecture
- Type: Church
- Completed: Church: 6th–7th century, renovated 13th century and 17th–18th century. Belfry: 1812
- Dome: 1
- Cultural Heritage Monument of Georgia
- Official name: Sioni Cathedral
- Designated: October 1, 2007; 18 years ago
- Reference no.: 4877
- Item Number in Cultural Heritage Portal: 3433
- Date of entry in the registry: October 11, 2007; 18 years ago
- Accounting Card / Passport #: 010404386

The Sioni Cathedral of the Dormition (Georgian: სიონის ღვთისმშობლის მიძინების ტაძარი) is a Georgian Orthodox cathedral located in Tbilisi, the capital of Georgia. Following a medieval Georgian tradition of naming churches after specific places in the Holy Land, the Sioni Cathedral bears the name of Mount Zion at Jerusalem. It is commonly referred to as the "Tbilisi Sioni" to distinguish it from other churches in Georgia with the same name.

The Tbilisi Sioni Cathedral is situated in the historic Sionis Kucha (Sioni Street) in downtown Tbilisi, with its eastern façade fronting the right bank of the Kura River. The cathedral was initially built in the 6th and 7th centuries. Since then, it has been destroyed by foreign invaders and reconstructed several times. The current structure is based on a 13th-century version, with some modifications made between the 17th and 19th centuries. The Sioni Cathedral served as the main Georgian Orthodox Cathedral and the seat of the Catholicos-Patriarch of All Georgia until the Holy Trinity Cathedral was consecrated in 2004.

== History ==
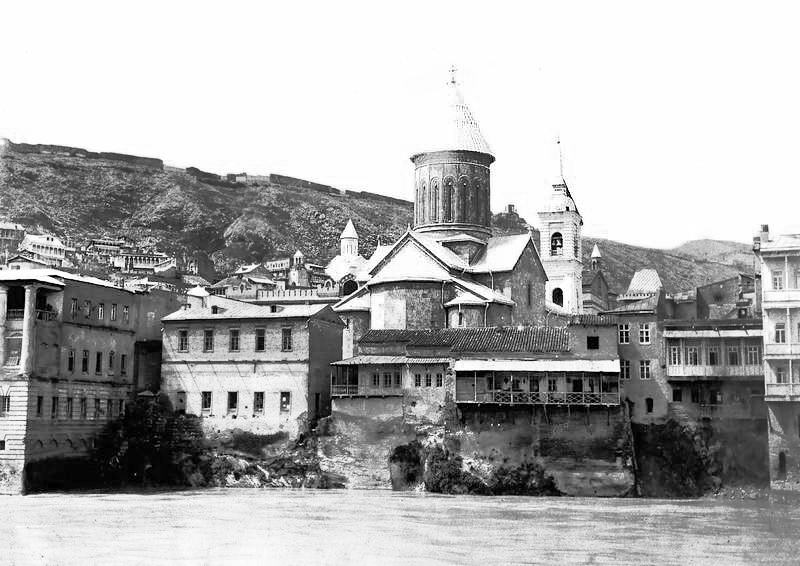
Sioni Cathedral as seen from the right side of the Kura River, 1870s

According to medieval Georgian annals, the construction of the original church on this site was initiated by King Vakhtang Gorgasali in the 5th century. A hundred years later, Guaram, the prince of Iberia (Kartli), in c. 575 began building a new structure, which was completed by his successor Adarnase in circa 639. According to legend, both princes were buried in this church, but no trace of their graves has been found. This early church was destroyed by Arabs, and was subsequently built de novo.

The cathedral was completely rebuilt by King David the Builder in 1112. The basic elements of the existing structure date from this period. It was heavily damaged in 1226, when its dome was ruined on the order of Jalal al-Din Mangburni. It was subsequently repaired, but damaged again by Timur in 1386 and repaired by King Alexander I. It was again damaged during the Persian invasions in 1522 and in the 17th century.

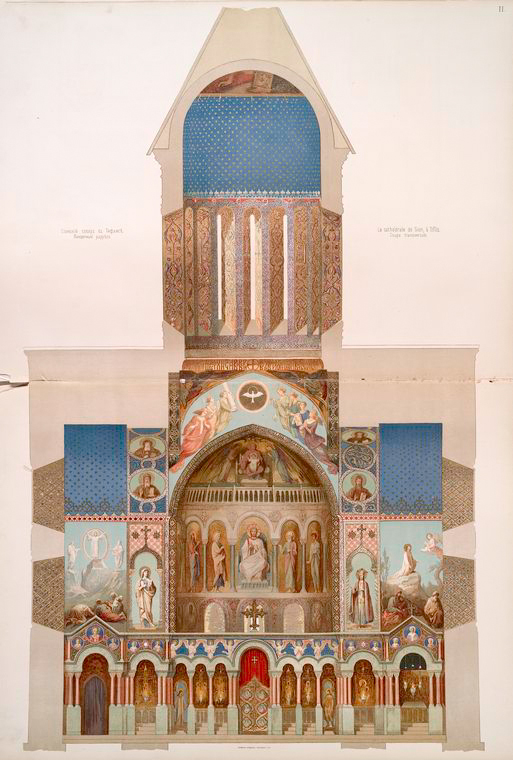
19th-century sectional drawing showing Grigory Gagarin's frescoes

In 1657, the Metropolitan of Tbilisi, Elise Saginashvili (died 1670), substantially restored the cupola, vaults, added the southern chapel, paintings and decorations, which is written on the southern annex, but the structure was again devastated in 1668, this time by earthquake. The regent of Kartli, batonishvili (prince) Vakhtang, carried out restorations of the cupola and stone plates of the cathedral walls in 1710, as it is carved on the northern wall. Thus, the current tufa facing of the church comes from that period. However, the church was again damaged by the invasion of the Persians in 1795.

The cathedral's interior took on a different look between 1850 and 1860, when the Russian artist and general Knyaz Grigory Gagarin (1810–1893) composed an interesting series of the murals, though a number of medieval frescoes were lost in the process. A portion of the murals on the western wall were executed by the Georgian artist Levan Tsutskiridze in the 1980s.

The stone iconostasis dates to the 1850s, and was also created according G. Gagarin's design. It replaced the wooden iconostasis burned during the Persian invasion in 1795. To the left of the altar is the venerated Grapevine cross which, according to tradition, was forged by Saint Nino, a Cappadocian woman who preached Christianity in the Caucasus in the early 4th century. King Vakhtang III gave the reliquary itself in the early 14th century.

The Sioni Cathedral was where the Russian Imperial manifesto on the annexation of Georgia was first published. On April 12, 1802, the Russian commander-in-chief in Georgia, General Karl von Knorring, assembled the Georgian nobles in the cathedral, which was then surrounded by Russian troops. The nobles were forced to take an oath to the Russian Imperial crown; any who disagreed were taken into custody.

Sioni Cathedral remained functional through Soviet times, and was partially renovated between 1980 and 1983.

== Architecture ==
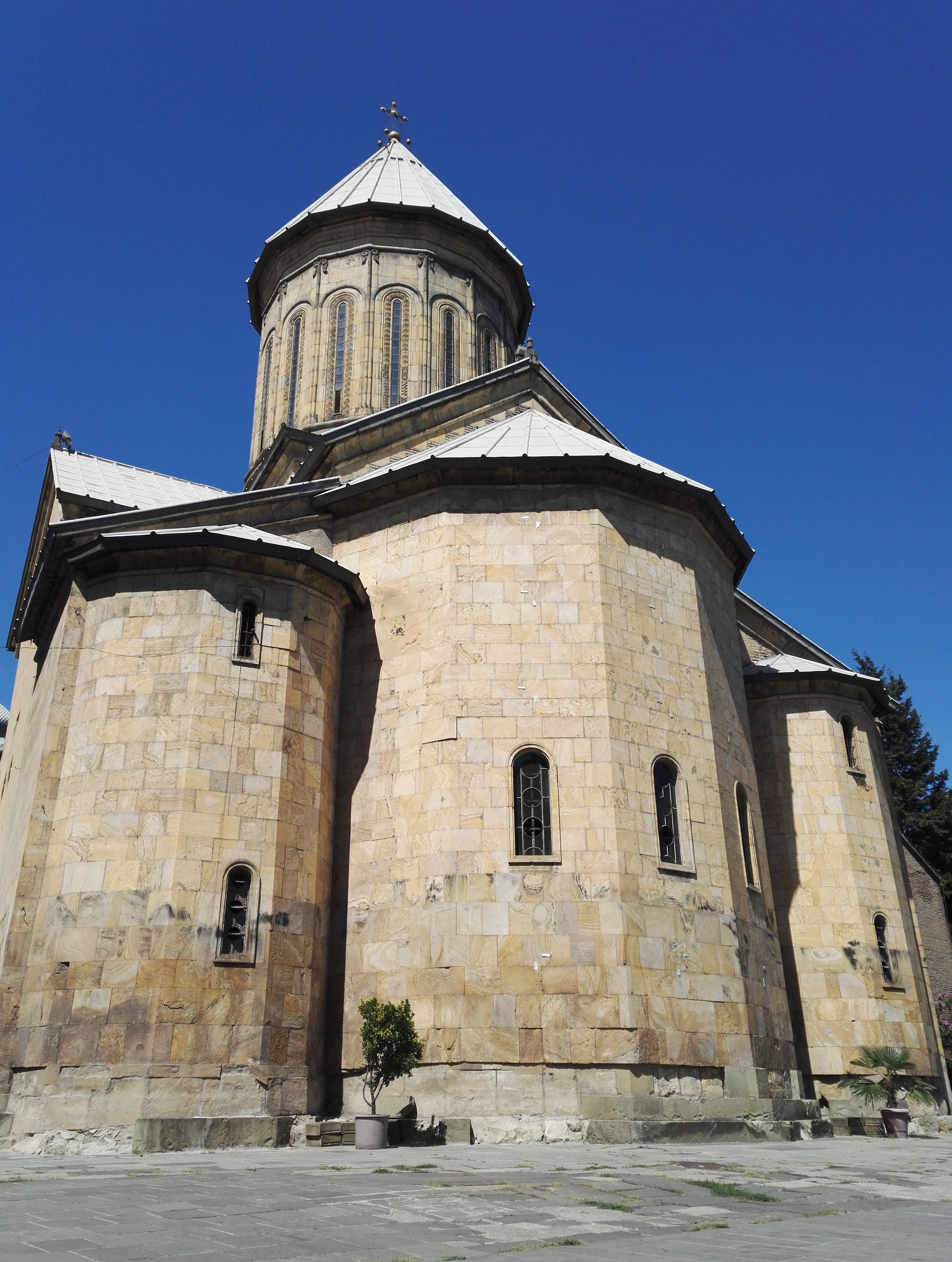
Eastern facade of the church with three faceted apsids

The Sioni Cathedral is a typical example of medieval Georgian church architecture of an inscribed cross-in-square design with projecting polygonal apses in the east façade. Main entrance is in the west side. The dome with the tholobate is supported by the altar wall and two freely standing pillars (a more advanced design that appeared after the 11th century). Transition from the pillars to the tholobate is via pointed arches. In addition, the pillars are connected to the northern and southern walls by helm-shaped arches (probably 16th century). The yellow tuff from which the cathedral was built comes from Bolnisi, a town southwest of Tbilisi. The façades are simple, with few decorations, although there are bas-relief carvings of a cross and a chained lion on the western side and an angel and saints on the north. All sixteen windows have carved ornamental frames. Shallow carvings indicate late decoration.

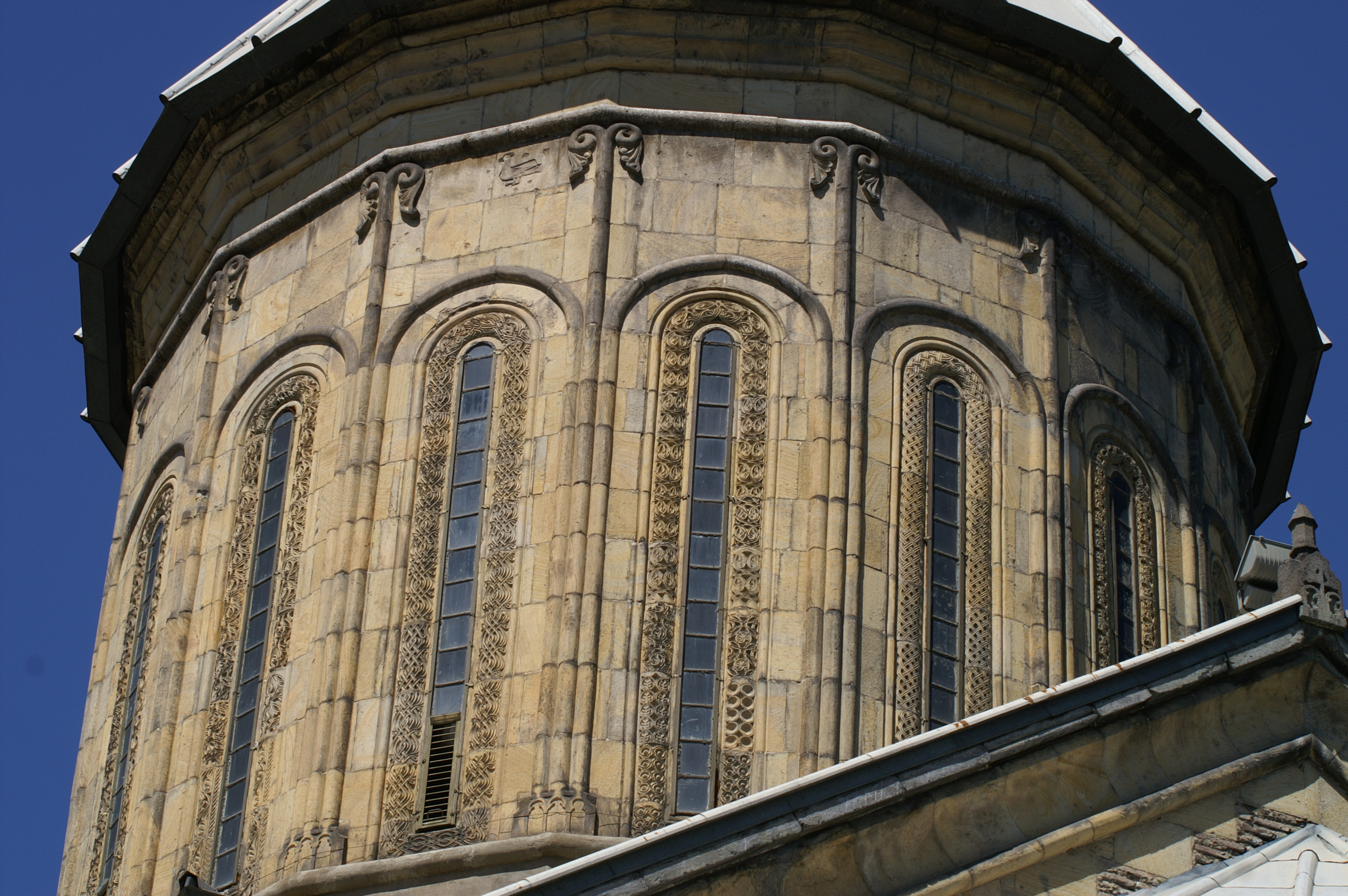
Tholobate of the church with decorations. Southeastern view

=== Bell towers ===
Tbilisi Sioni Old Bell Tower
- თბილისის სიონის ძველი სამრეკლო

General information
- Type: Bell tower
- Completed: 1425; 601 years ago

Technical details
- Material: Brick, Stone

Cultural Heritage Monument of Georgia
- Official name: Sioni Bell Tower
- Designated: October 1, 2007; 18 years ago
- Reference no.: 4876
- Item Number in Cultural Heritage Portal: 3447
- Date of entry in the registry: October 11, 2007; 18 years ago
- Accounting Card / Passport #: 010404385

Tbilisi Sioni New Bell Tower
- თბილისის სიონის ახალი სამრეკლო
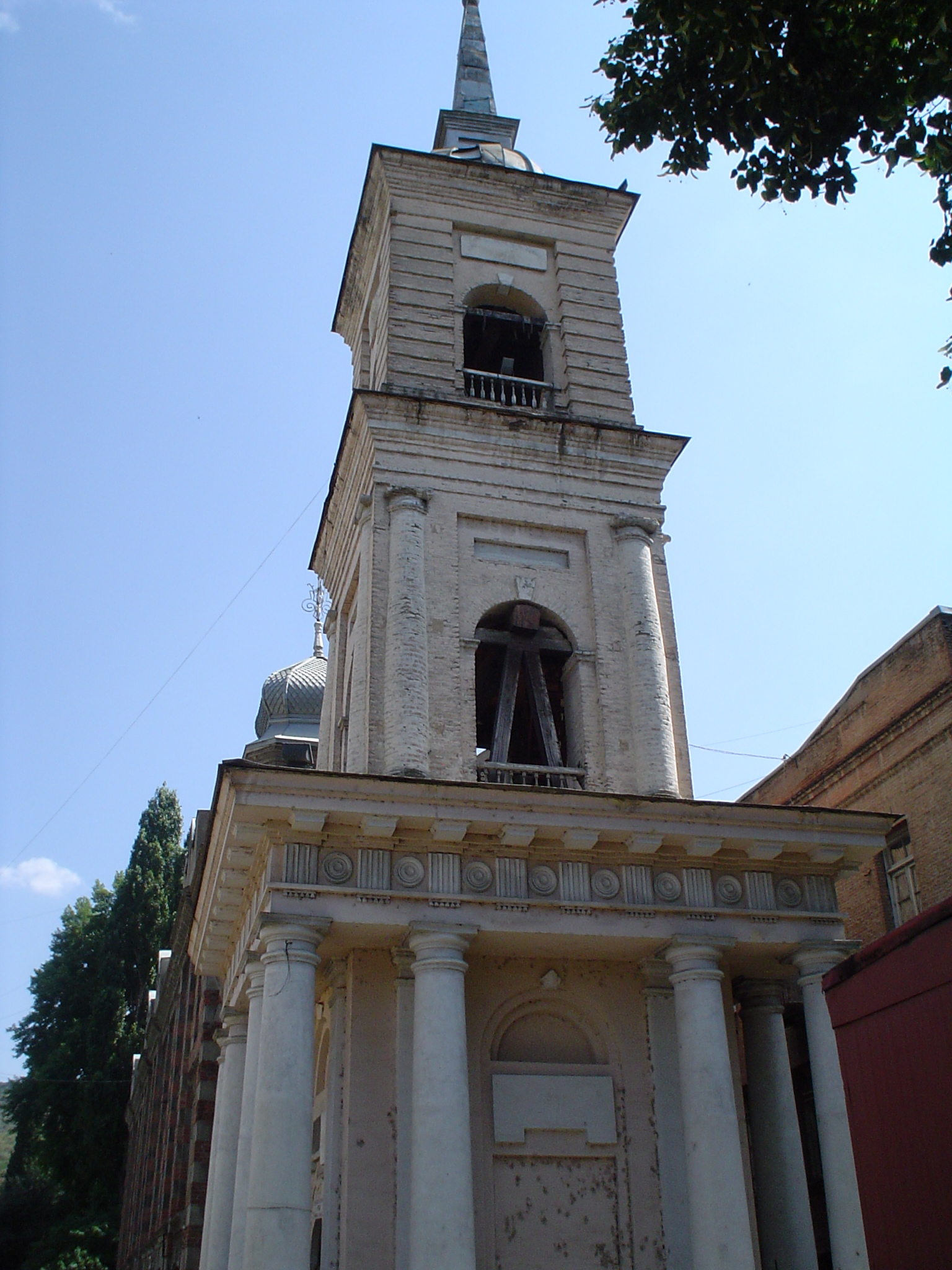

General information
- Type: Bell tower
- Architectural style: Neoclassical architecture
- Completed: 1812; 214 years ago

Technical details
- Material: Brick

Cultural Heritage Monument of Georgia
- Official name: Sioni Bell Tower(New)
- Designated: October 1, 2007; 18 years ago
- Reference no.: 4878
- Item Number in Cultural Heritage Portal: 3864
- Date of entry in the registry: October 11, 2007; 18 years ago
- Accounting Card / Passport #: 010404387

North of the cathedral, within the courtyard, is a freestanding three-story bell tower dating from the 1425 reconstruction by King Alexander I. Largely destroyed by the Persian shah Agha Mohammad Khan Qajar in 1795, it was restored to its present condition in 1939.

Across the street stands another three-story bell tower; one of the earliest examples of Russian Neoclassical architecture in the region. Complete in 1812, the bell tower was commissioned under Pavel Tsitsianov using money awarded in recognition of his conquest of Ganja for the Russian Empire.

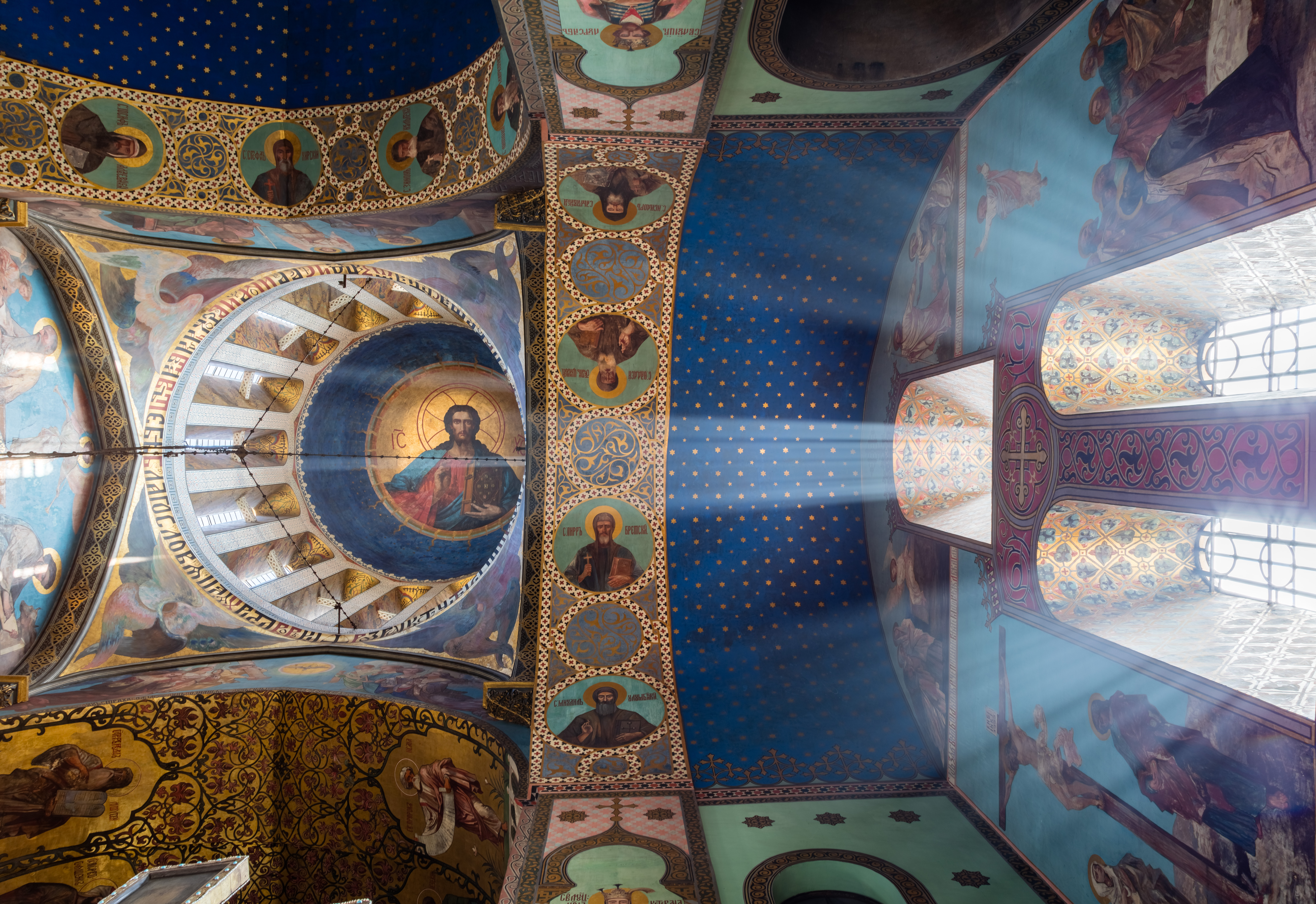
View of the ceiling

The murals, painted by G. Gagarin, and iconostasis, also designed by him in 1850s-60s, differed from traditional Georgian tradition.

== Burials ==
The Sioni Cathedral serves as a burial ground for several notable churchmen, including the 20th-century Catholicoi-Patriarchs of Georgia, and economic and political figure Giorgi Maisashvili:

- Kyrion II,
- Leonid,
- Ambrose,
- Christophorus III,
- Callistratus,
- Melchizedek III,
- Ephraim II,
- David V
- Ilia II
- Giorgi Maisashvili
- Pavel Tsitsianov
