= David V, Catholicos-Patriarch of Georgia =

Catholicos-Patriarch of All Georgia (1972-1977)

His Holiness and Beatitude David V
- The Catholicos-Patriarch of All Georgia, the Archbishop of Mtskheta-Tbilisi
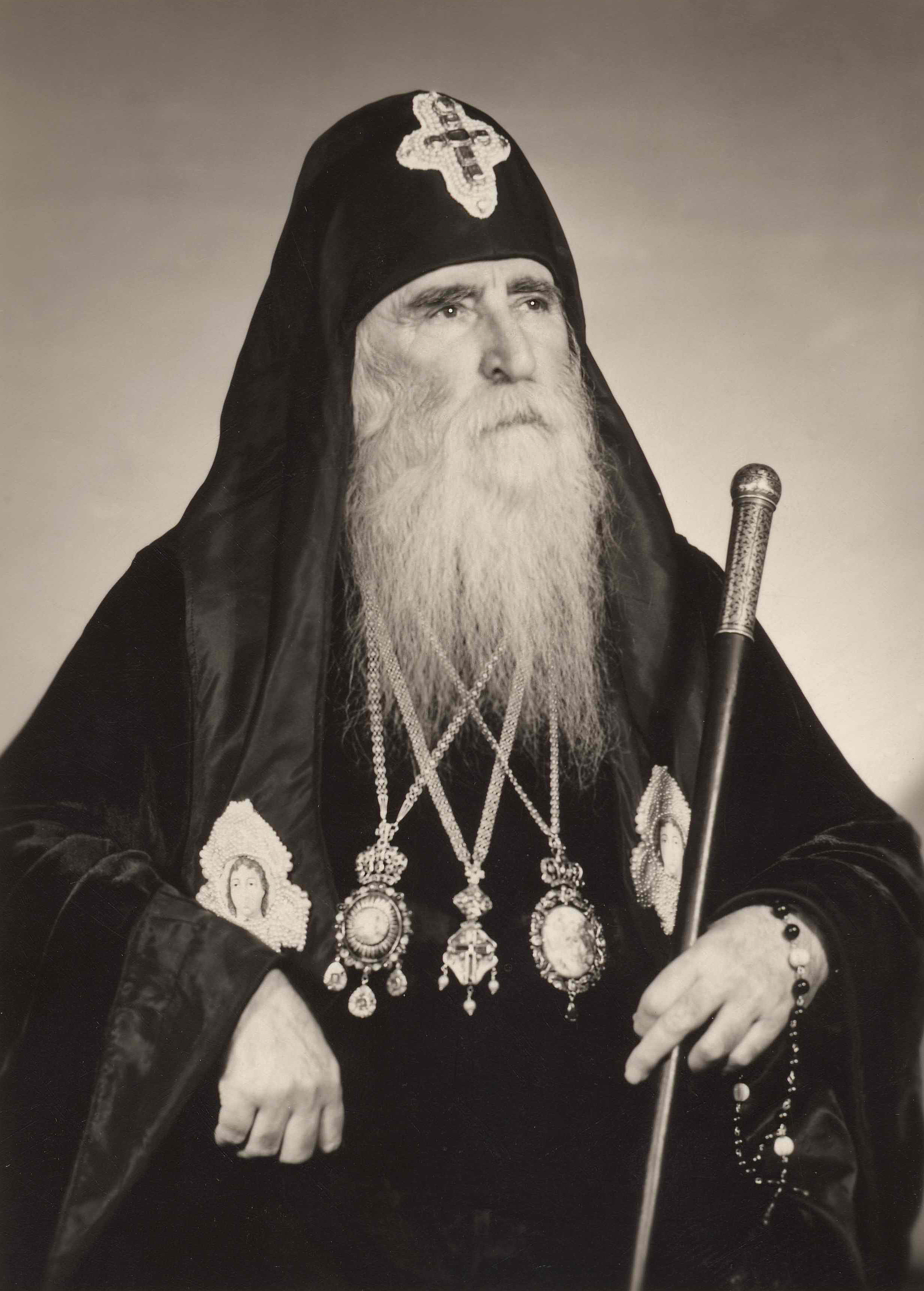
- Church: Georgian Orthodox Church
- Installed: 1 July 1972
- Term ended: 9 November 1977
- Predecessor: Ephraim II
- Successor: Ilia II

Orders
- Ordination: 1927
- Consecration: 1956

Personal details
- Born: Khariton Devdariani; April 6, 1903 Mirotsminda, Caucasus Viceroyalty, Russian Empire
- Died: November 9, 1977 (aged 74) Tbilisi, Georgian SSR, Soviet Union
- Denomination: Eastern Orthodox Church
- Occupation: Catholicos-Patriarch
- Profession: Theologian

David V (Georgian: დავით V), born as Khariton Devdariani (ხარიტონ დევდარიანი) (April 6, 1903 – November 9, 1977) was a Catholicos-Patriarch of All Georgia from July 2, 1972, until his death. His full title was His Holiness and Beatitude, Archbishop of Mtskheta-Tbilisi and Catholicos-Patriarch of All Georgia.

Born in the village of Mirotsminda (now Kharagauli Municipality, Imereti), David became a priest in 1927 and a bishop in 1956. From 1959 to 1972 he served as a chorbishop to Catholicos-Patriarch Ephraim II, upon whose death he succeeded to the position of primate of the Georgian Orthodox Church.

David V's ascension to the patriarchal see was followed by some controversy. Unlike his predecessor Ephraim II, who frequently appealed to Georgian patriotism, David never gained popularity because of his perceived loyalty to the Soviet regime. Furthermore, Georgian dissidents suspected that the Soviet security arm (KGB) was involved in David's election by rigging it and destroying Ephraim's will, which had allegedly endorsed Bishop Ilia of Sukhumi and Abkhazia as his successor. The Georgian nationalist underground claimed in their samizdat publications that corruption and moral depravity flourished in the church under David V. He was also accused of being involved, along with Georgian Communist party officials and the KGB, in the robbery of Georgian church treasures.

David V died in Tbilisi and was buried at the Sioni Cathedral in 1977. He was succeeded by Ilia II, whom the Soviets had allegedly tried to keep out of office.
