= Archbishop of Nikortsminda =

List of Orthodox Archbishops of Nikortsminda of the Georgian Orthodox and Apostolic Church:

- Elise (Jokhadze) (present)
