= Ephraim II of Georgia =

Catholicos-Patriarch of All Georgia (1960-1972)

His Holiness and Beatitude Ephraim II
- The Catholicos-Patriarch of All Georgia, the Archbishop of Mtskheta-Tbilisi
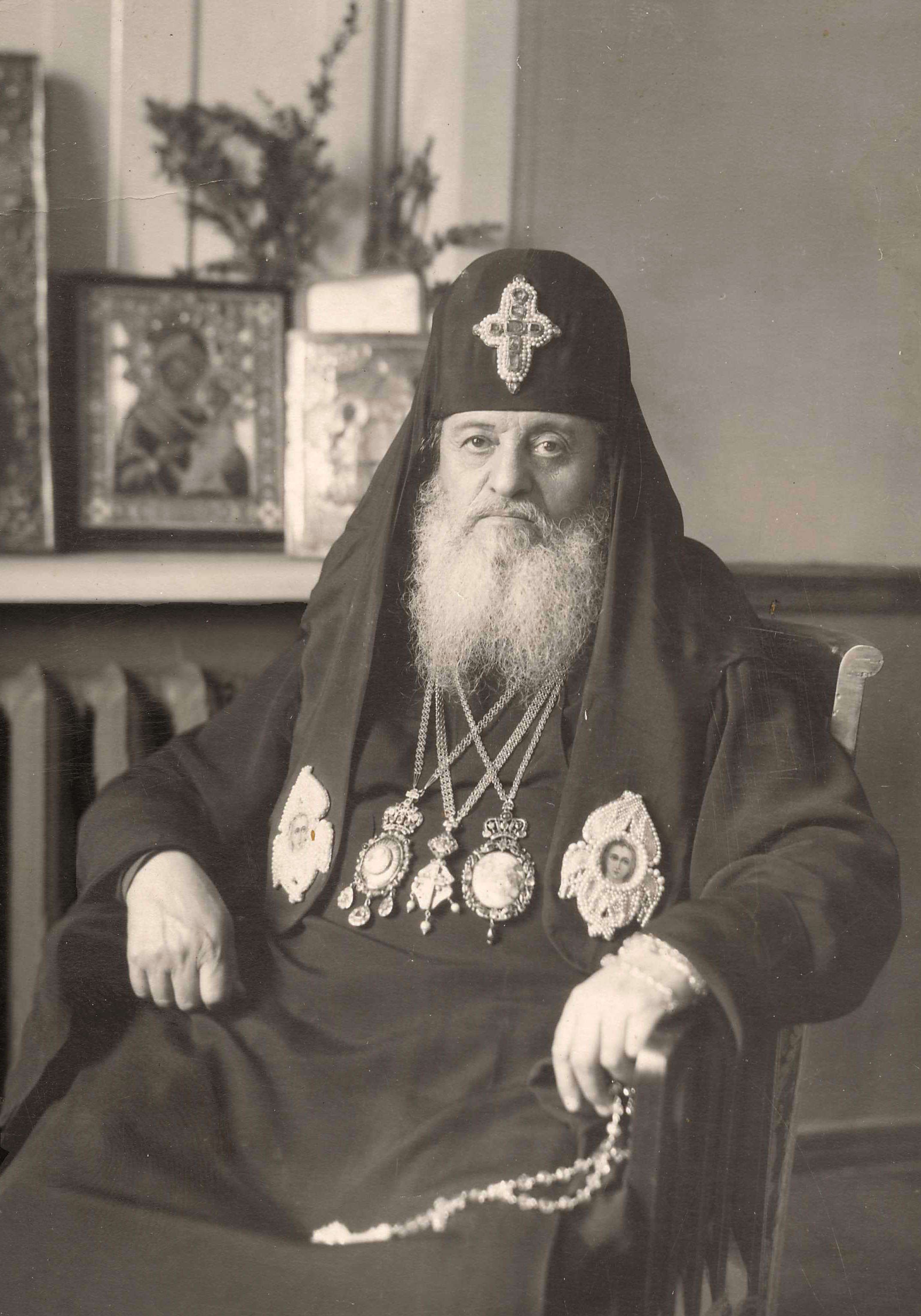
- Church: Georgian Orthodox Church
- Installed: 21 February 1960
- Term ended: 7 April 1972
- Predecessor: Melchizedek III
- Successor: David V
- Previous posts: Bishop of Nikortsminda; Bishop of Gelati and Kutaisi; Metropolitan of Batumi-Shemokmedi and Chkondidi

Orders
- Ordination: 1922
- Consecration: 1927

Personal details
- Born: Grigol Sidamonidze; 19 October 1896
- Died: 7 April 1972 (aged 75)
- Denomination: Eastern Orthodox Church
- Occupation: Catholicos-Patriarch
- Profession: Theologian
- Khelrtva

Ephraim II (Georgian: ეფრემ II, Eprem; 19 October 1896 – 7 April 1972) was Catholicos-Patriarch of All Georgia from 1960 until his death. His full title was His Holiness and Beatitude, Archbishop of Mtskheta-Tbilisi and Catholicos-Patriarch of All Georgia.

Born as Grigol Sidamonidze, the future prelate graduated from the Tiflis Theological Seminary in 1918 and from the Tbilisi State University with a degree in philosophy in 1925. He became a monk in 1922. At various times, from 1927 to 1960, he served as bishop of Nikortsminda, bishop of Gelati and Kutaisi, and metropolitan of Batumi-Shemokmedi and Chkondidi. After the death of Melchizedek III in 1960, Ephraim was elected to the office of Catholicos-Patriarch of Georgia. During his tenure, Ephraim tried to avoid confrontation with the Soviet government, but produced a series of sermons, appealing to Georgian patriotism, for which he gained popularity. At the same time, he cultivated friendly ties with the Russian Orthodox Church and the Armenian Apostolic Church and, in 1962, brought the Georgian church into the World Council of Churches (of which it would remain a member until 1997). He died in 1972 and was interred at the Tbilisi Sioni Cathedral.
