= Melchizedek III of Georgia =

Catholicos-Patriarch of All Georgia (1952-1960)

His Holiness and Beatitude Melchizedek III
- The Catholicos-Patriarch of All Georgia, Archbishop of Mtskheta-Tbilisi
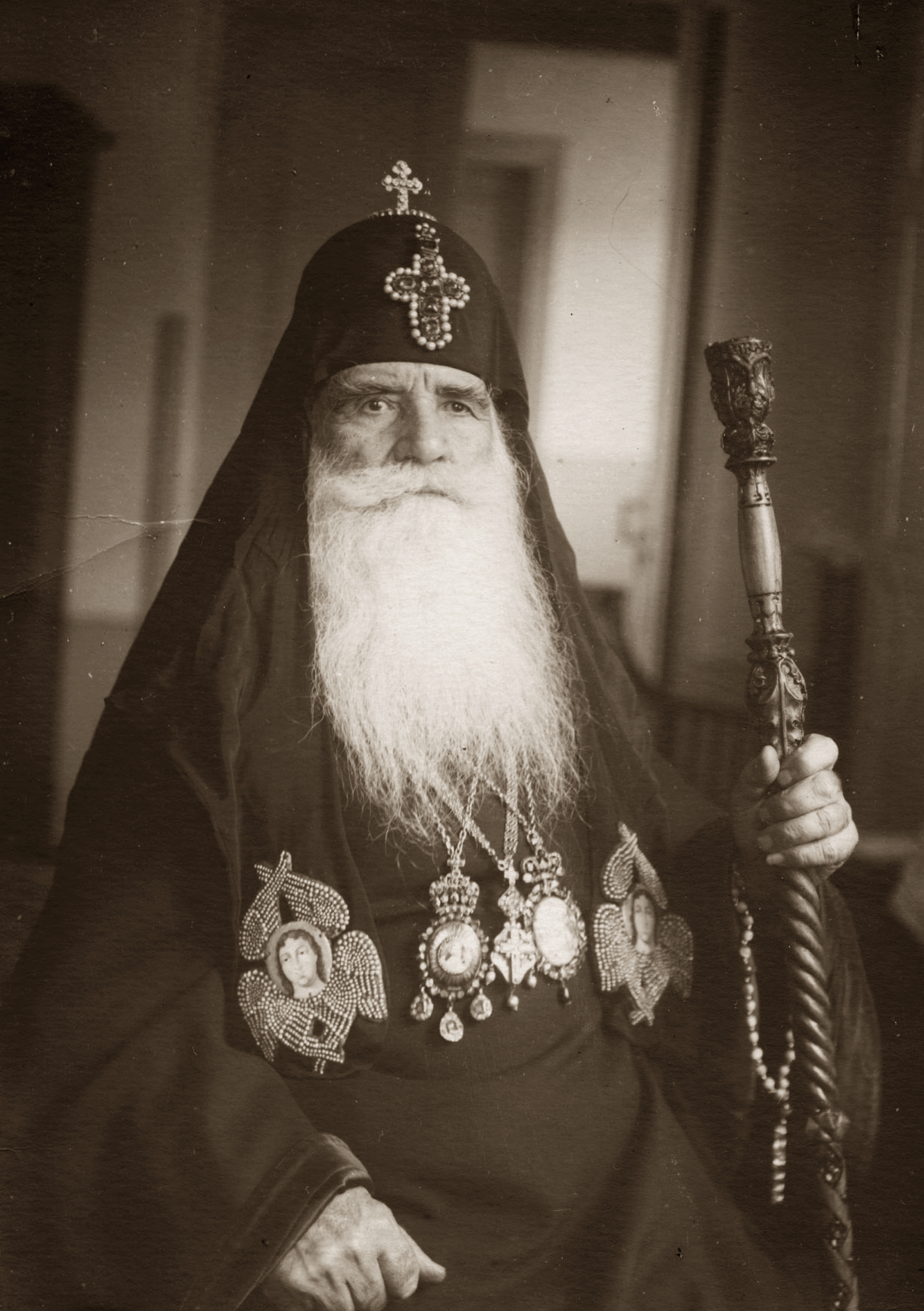
- Church: Georgian Orthodox Church
- Installed: 5 April 1952
- Term ended: 10 January 1960
- Predecessor: Callistratus
- Successor: Ephraim II

Orders
- Ordination: 1915
- Consecration: 1925

Personal details
- Born: Mikheil Pkhaladze; November 2, 1872 Kandaura, Signakh uezd, Tiflis Governorate, Caucasus Viceroyalty, Russian Empire
- Died: January 10, 1960 (aged 87) Tbilisi, Georgian SSR, Soviet Union
- Denomination: Eastern Orthodox Church
- Occupation: Catholicos-Patriarch
- Profession: Theologian
- Khelrtva: Melchizedek III's signature

Melchizedek III (Georgian: მელქისედეკ III) (November 2, 1872 – January 10, 1960) was Catholicos-Patriarch of All Georgia from 1952 until his death. His full title was His Holiness and Beatitude, Archbishop of Mtskheta-Tbilisi and Catholicos-Patriarch of All Georgia.

== Biography ==
Born as Mikheil Pkhaladze (მიხეილ ფხალაძე) on 2 November 1872 into the family of Giorgi Pkhaladze, a church reader who later became the parish priest of the Church of St George in the village of Kandaura (now Zemo Kandaura). The Pkhaladze family was of princely origin and had migrated to Kakheti from Imereti.

In 1883, he enrolled at the Telavi Theological School, where he first demonstrated an aptitude for mathematics. In 1889, he graduated as one of its most distinguished students and entered the Tiflis Theological Seminary. After graduating from the seminary, he enrolled at the Kazan Theological Academy in 1896. He graduated in 1900 with the degree of Candidate of Theology and the qualification to teach at theological seminaries.

In 1900, Pkhaladze was appointed a teacher of Russian at the Kutaisi Theological School. In 1904, he was transferred to a theological school in Bely, Smolensk Governorate (now in Tver Oblast), where he taught arithmetic, geography and natural sciences. In 1909, he was appointed a teacher of physics and mathematics at the Podolia Theological Seminary.

In 1915, he was ordained a priest and appointed superintendent of the Tyvriv Theological School. In January 1917, he returned to the Kutaisi Theological School as its superintendent. In September of the same year, he was transferred to the position of superintendent of the Gori Theological School.

In 1918, theological educational institutions were closed, and the teachers of the Gori Theological School were transferred to the Gori Boys' Gymnasium, where Father Mikheil temporarily taught physics. In 1920, he was forced to leave the gymnasium because of his status as a priest and became unemployed. During the following years, he and his family lived in severe poverty. For a time, the future patriarch had to exchange his priestly vestments for the work clothes of a labourer on the Kakheti Railway.

In 1925, he took monastic vows, was elevated to the rank of archimandrite and was consecrated Bishop of Alaverdi.

On 17 October 1927, he was appointed Metropolitan of Sukhumi and Abkhazia.

In 1938, as the persecution of the Church intensified, he was forced to move to Tbilisi, where he remained unemployed for several years.

On 1 April 1943, he was appointed a priest at the Church of St Nina in the Kukia Cemetery in Tbilisi.

On 30 April 1944, he was appointed rector of the Church of the Mother of God in Didube, Tbilisi, and Metropolitan of Urbnisi.

On 5 April 1952, he was elected Catholicos-Patriarch of All Georgia.

During his patriarchate, several prominent churches in Georgia were restored and reopened. These included the Church of St George at Bodbe Monastery, which houses the relics of Saint Nino, the enlightener of Georgia; Motsameta Monastery, to which the relics of the holy martyrs David and Constantine were returned; and the Church of St George in Ilori. Melchizedek III also developed a plan to restore theological education in Georgia.

Melchizedek III died on 10 January 1960. His coffin was placed in Sioni Cathedral in Tbilisi. The day after his death, the episcopate of the Georgian Orthodox Church elected Metropolitan Ephraim of Batumi, Shemokmedi and Chkondidi as locum tenens of the patriarchal throne. Melchizedek III was buried in Sioni Cathedral on 17 January.

== Family ==
He was married to Nino, a member of the princely Abazadze family. Following her death in 1925, Mikheil Pkhaladze entered monastic life. The couple had four children. A son and a daughter died tragically, while another son disappeared during the 1930s.

== Connections with Ukraine ==
The family of Melchizedek III maintained close ties with the Nareklishvili family, a dynasty of winemakers from the village of Kandaura. One of its descendants is the Ukrainian philanthropist Oleksandr Petrovskyi. In 1892, Giorgi Pkhaladze, the future patriarch's father, became the godfather of Abram Nareklishvili, Petrovskyi's great-grandfather.

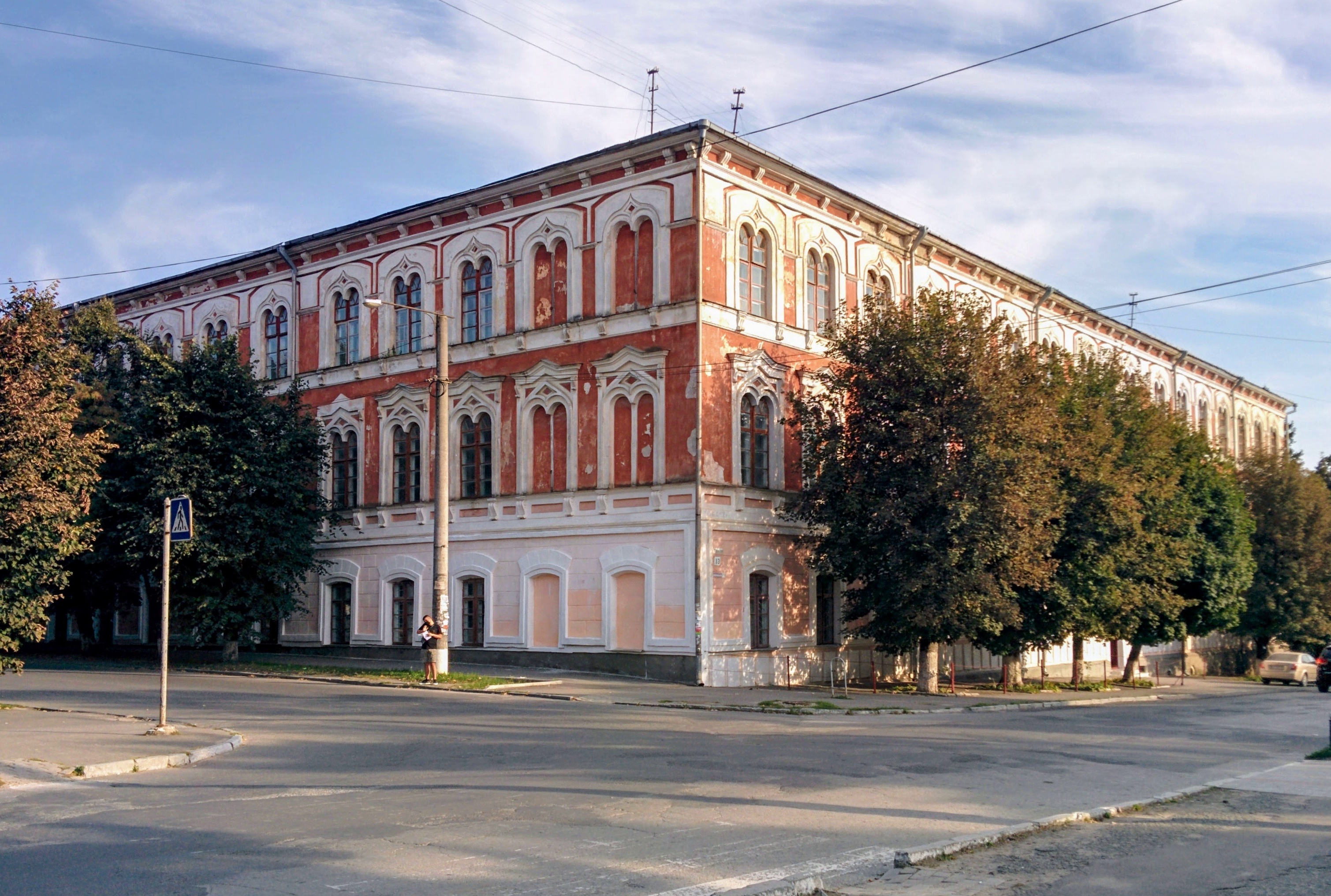
The former building of the Podolia Theological Seminary in Kamianets-Podilskyi, Ukraine, where the future Georgian patriarch Melchizedek III taught. Modern photograph.

Several former students of Mikheil Pkhaladze (the future Melchizedek III) at the Podolia Theological Seminary later became prominent figures in the Ukrainian Autocephalous Orthodox Church (UAOC) and participants in the Ukrainian Revolution of 1917–1921. Among them were Kost Turkalo, a member of the Central Council of Ukraine; Oleksii Kozlovskyi, a major in the Ukrainian People's Army; Leontii Forostivskyi, one of the first UAOC clergymen in Vinnytsia; Oleksii Potulnytskyi, head of a UAOC diocesan administration; and Mykola Hadsinskyj, a nuclear physicist, professor at the Rochester Institute of Technology in the United States, and chairman of the executive board of the Union of Hetmanite Statesmen in North America. Other former students included the UAOC priests Mykhailo Matkovskyi, Yurii Novodvorskyi, Danylo Kurhan and Mykolai Trembovetskyi, who were subjected to political repression.

Vasyl Harba, a graduate of the Podolia Theological Seminary and a Ukrainian émigré writer, recalled Pkhaladze in his memoir Na zolotii nyvi Podillia (In the Golden Fields of Podolia), published in Clifton, New Jersey, in 1970. He described Pkhaladze as a "strict but fair" teacher. According to historian Oleksandr Muzychko, the atmosphere at the Podolia Theological Seminary, which was then described as a "breeding ground of Ukrainian national consciousness", also influenced the future patriarch's development as a Georgian patriot.

During his years in Kamianets-Podilskyi (1909–1915), Mikheil Pkhaladze was also actively engaged in scholarly work and developed his own mathematical theory of chess.
