= Saint Andrew the First-Called Georgian University of the Patriarchate of Georgia =

University in Tbilisi, Georgia

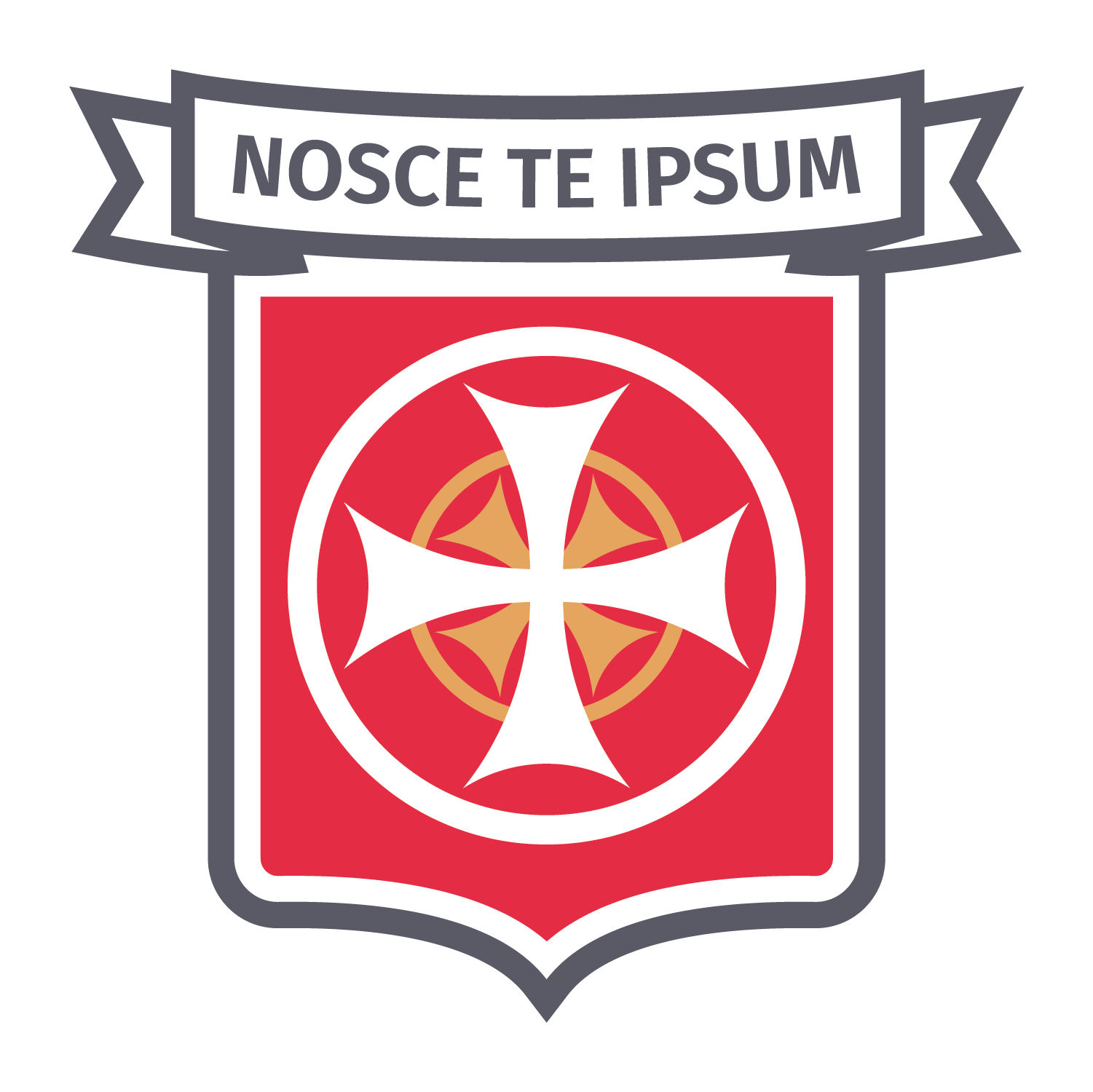
- SANGU
- Motto: Nosce Te Ipsum
- Type: Private
- Established: 2008
- President: Irakli Brachuli
- Location: 53a, Ilia Chavchavadze Ave., Tbilisi, Georgia; 41°42′39″N 44°44′29″E
- Colours
- Website: www.sangu.edu.ge

The Saint Andrew the First-Called Georgian University of the Patriarchate of Georgia (Georgian: საქართველოს საპატრიარქოს წმიდა ანდრია პირველწოდებულის სახელობის ქართული უნივერსიტეტი, romanized: sakartvelos sap'at'riarkos ts'mida andria p'irvelts'odebulis sakhelobis kartuli universit'et'i) is a university founded in 2008 in Tbilisi, Georgia.

== Notable people ==
- Sergo Vardosanidze, rector
