= Catholicos-Patriarch of All Georgia =

Head of the Georgian Orthodox Church

Catholicos-Patriarch of All Georgia სრულიად საქართველოს კათოლიკოს-პატრიარქი Archbishop of Mtskheta and Tbilisi
- Archbishopric

Eastern Orthodox
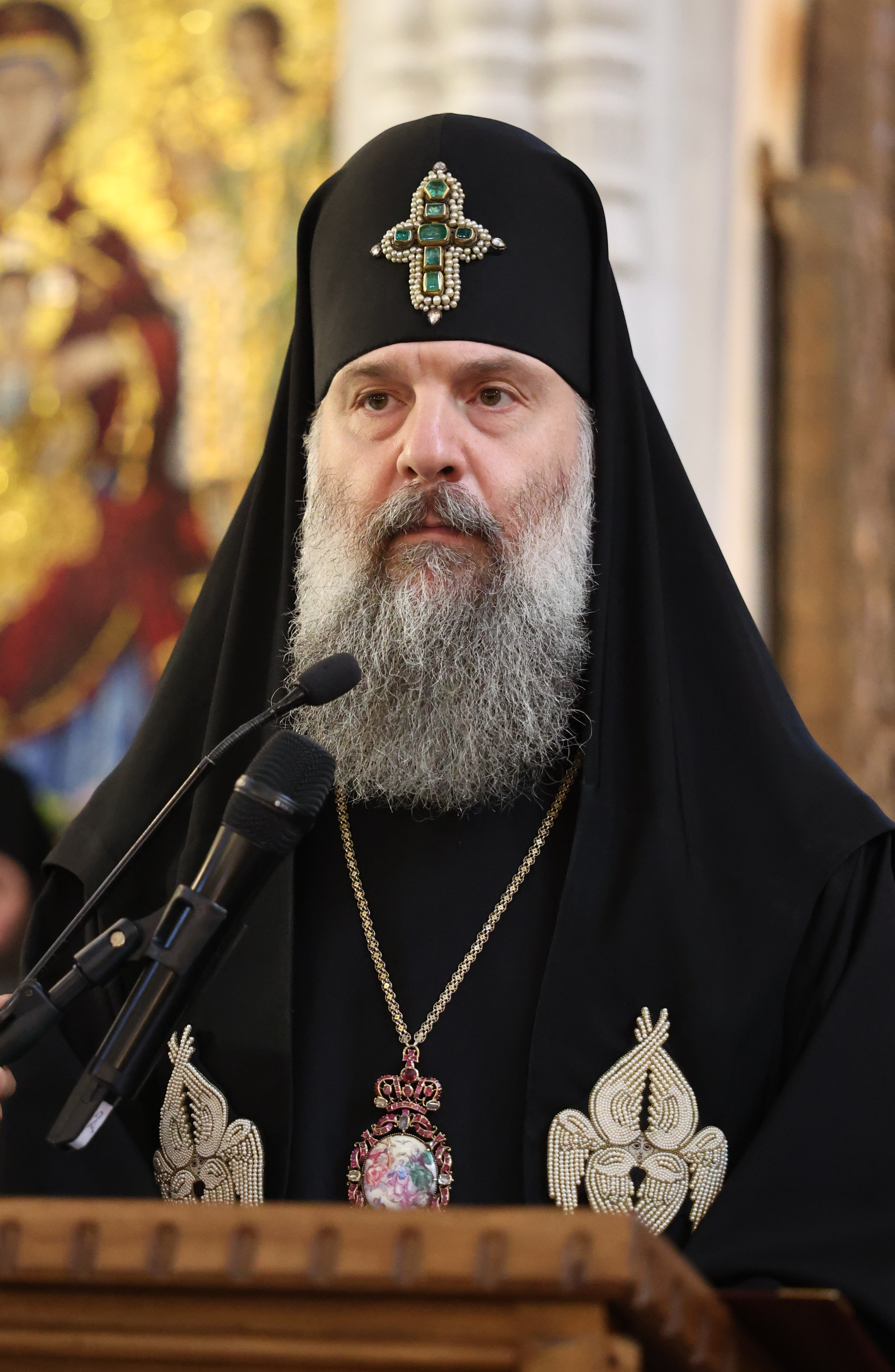

- Coat of arms of the Georgian Orthodox Church
- Incumbent; Shio III since 11 May 2026
- Style: His Holiness and Beatitude

Location
- Country: Georgia
- Ecclesiastical province: Mtskheta and Tbilisi
- Residence: Tbilisi

Information
- First holder: Melkisedek I
- Cathedral: Holy Trinity Cathedral of Tbilisi, Tbilisi Sioni Cathedral and Svetitskhoveli Cathedral

Website
- www.patriarchate.ge

The Catholicos-Patriarch of All Georgia (Georgian: სრულიად საქართველოს კათოლიკოს პატრიარქი, romanized: sruliad sakartvelos k'atolik'os p'at'riarki) is the Archbishop of Mtskheta and Tbilisi and the head of the Georgian Orthodox Church.

The official full title is His Holiness and Beatitude, Catholicos-Patriarch of All Georgia and the Archbishop of Mtskheta and Tbilisi, Metropolitan Bishop of Bichvinta and Tskhum-Abkhazia.

The incumbent Catholicos-Patriarch of the church is Patriarch Shio III since his election in 2026, who is also the Metropolitan Bishop of Bichvinta and Tskhum-Abkhazia.

Catholicos-Patriarch has been the title of the heads of the Georgian Orthodox Church since 1010, shortly after the unification of the Kingdom of Georgia. The first Catholicos-Patriarch of All Georgia was Melkisedek I (1010–1033). In the 15th century, with the collapse of the Kingdom, the Georgian Orthodox Church was divided into the East and the West parts and accordingly they were ruled by the Catholicos-Patriarch of East Georgia and the Catholicos-Patriarch of West Georgia.

In 1801, the Kingdom of Kartli-Kakheti (Eastern Georgia) was occupied and annexed by the Tsarist Russian Empire. In 1811, the autocephalous status (independence) of the Georgian Orthodox Church was abolished by Russia and the Russian Orthodox Church took over its administration.

In 1917, the autocephaly of the Georgian Orthodox Church was restored. The first Catholicos-Patriarch of All Georgia since the restoration of autocephaly was Kyrion II Sadzaglishvili (1917–1918).

To date there have been 82 Catholicos-Patriarchs, of whom 7 have been formally glorified by the Georgian Orthodox Church.

== See also ==
- List of heads of the Georgian Orthodox Church
- Catholicate of Abkhazia
