= Udo Reinhold Jeck =

German philosopher

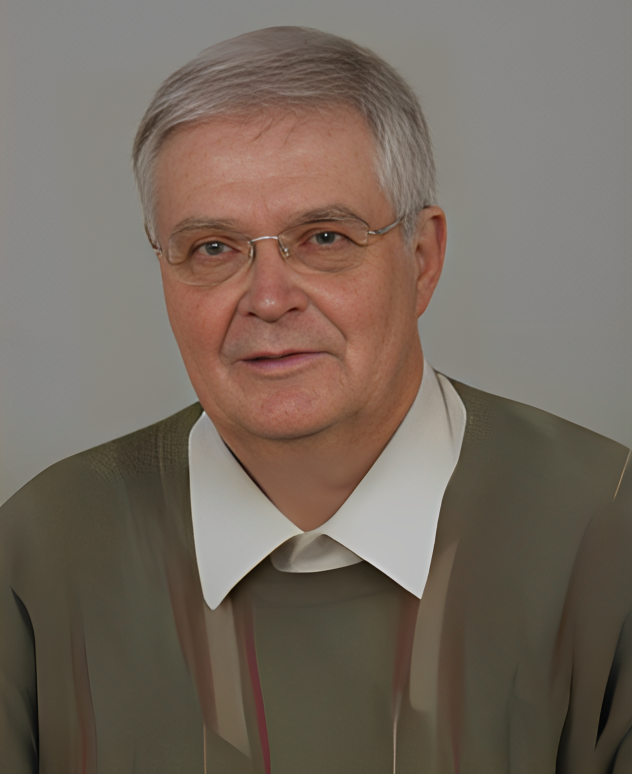
- Citizenship: Germany
- Occupation: Philosophy

Academic background
- Education: Ruhr University Bochum
- Thesis: (1992)
- Influences: Kurt Flasch Burkhard Mojsisch

Academic work
- Discipline: Philosopher
- Sub-discipline: Medieval Philosophy, German Studies, Neurophilosophy
- Institutions: New Georgian University

Udo Reinhold Jeck (born 1952) is a German philosopher whose research focuses on ancient and medieval philosophy, Neoplatonism, Byzantine and Georgian philosophy, German idealism, and neurophilosophy. He is particularly known for his studies of the transmission of Platonic and Aristotelian traditions between the Byzantine, Georgian, and Latin intellectual worlds.

== Biography ==
From 1983 onwards, Jeck studied philosophy under Kurt Flasch at Ruhr University Bochum, alongside art history, German studies, Indo-European linguistics, Byzantine and modern Greek philology. In 1992 he completed his doctorate in philosophy at Ruhr University Bochum. From 1992 to 1997 he worked as a research associate on the editorial project ''Corpus Philosophorum Teutonicorum Medii Aevi'', a major scholarly undertaking devoted to medieval German philosophical texts.

In 2002 Jeck completed his habilitation in philosophy at Ruhr University Bochum. In 2008 he was appointed adjunct professor of philosophy at the Faculty of Philosophy, Education and Journalism of Ruhr University Bochum. During the same year he served as a visiting professor at the University of Lüneburg. From 2009 he was Professor of Philosophy and Social Sciences at Grigol Robakidze University in Tbilisi, Georgia. In 2013 he became Professor of Scientific Methods and Academic Skills at the University of Applied Sciences Bochum.

His academic engagement with Georgia intensified through his cooperation with the New Georgian University. In 2014 he became head of the international department of the Archive of Caucasian Philosophy and Theology. In 2017 he was appointed Professor of Christian Philosophy at New Georgian University in Poti.

== Work ==
Jeck's work spans several fields of philosophical inquiry. His doctoral dissertation, published as ''Aristoteles contra Augustinum'' (1994), examines the relationship between time and soul in ancient Aristotelian commentators, Arabic Aristotelianism, and thirteenth-century scholastic philosophy. The study traces interpretations of Aristotle's discussion of time in ''Physics'' IV from late antiquity through Arabic philosophy to the Latin Middle Ages. His research has addressed the thought of Aristotle, Augustine, Avicenna, Averroes, Albert the Great, and the traditions of medieval Aristotelianism and Neoplatonism.

A significant portion of Jeck's scholarship investigates the reception of Plato and Neoplatonism in late antiquity and the Middle Ages. His studies have explored the influence of Proclus, the Platonic tradition in Byzantium, and the transmission of Neoplatonic ideas into Georgian and Armenian intellectual culture. His book ''Platonica Orientalia: Aufdeckung einer philosophischen Tradition'' (2004) argued for the existence of a distinct eastern Platonic tradition connecting Byzantine, Caucasian, and medieval European philosophical developments.

Jeck is among the German scholars most closely associated with the study of Georgian philosophy. His research has focused on medieval Georgian Neoplatonism, especially the work of Ioane Petritsi and the reception of Proclus in Georgia. His book ''Erläuterungen zur georgischen Philosophie'' (2010) introduced German-speaking readers to the history and major figures of Georgian philosophical thought. Through his institutional work in Georgia, Jeck has contributed to the internationalization of research on Caucasian intellectual history.

In addition to historical scholarship, Jeck has published studies on modern philosophy, especially German Idealism. His work addresses the philosophies of Johann Gottlieb Fichte, Friedrich Wilhelm Joseph Schelling, Friedrich Schlegel, and Georg Wilhelm Friedrich Hegel. He has also contributed to neurophilosophy and the history of theories of the brain and mind. Together with Christoph Jamme, he edited the volume ''Natur und Geist: Die Philosophie entdeckt das Gehirn'' (2013), which examines philosophical approaches to neuroscience and theories of consciousness.

In 2012, an international conference dedicated to Jeck's 60th birthday was held in Georgia. The proceedings of the conference were subsequently published as East and West: Intercultural and Interdisciplinary Studies, edited by Tengiz Iremadze and Guram Tevzadze (Tbilisi, 2012).

== Selected publications ==
=== Books ===
- Aristoteles contra Augustinum. Zur Frage nach dem Verhältnis von Zeit und Seele bei den antiken Aristoteleskommentatoren, im arabischen Aristotelismus und im 13. Jahrhundert (Bo¬chumer Studien zur Philosophie 21), Amsterdam/Philadelphia 1994.
- Platonica Orientalia. Aufdeckung einer philosophischen Tradition, Frankfurt am Main 2004.
- Erläuterungen zur georgischen Philosophie, (Deutsch/Georgisch), Tbilissi 2010, 2. Aufl. 2012.
- U. R. Jeck, K. Flasch (Hrsg.), Das Licht der Vernunft. Die Anfänge der Aufklärung im Mittelalter, München 1997.
- G. Baramidze, M. Gogatishvili, L. Zakaradze, U. R. Jeck, D. J. Lacey (Hrsg.), (Neo)Platonism and Modernity. Materials of the International Conferencededicated to Tengiz Iremadze's book „Konzeptionen des Denkens im Neuplatonismus", 30 June 2008, Grigol Robakidze University, Tbilisi 2009.
- "Vakhtang Gorgasali – Chrsitian and Philosopher King", Favoriti Stili, 2019. (in Georgian).

=== Articles ===
- Ps.-Dionysios Areopagites und der Bilderstreit in Byzanz, in: Hermeneia. Zeitschrift für ostkirchliche Kunst 8,2 (1992) 71–80.
- Materia, forma substantialis, transmutatio. Frühe Bemerkungen Alberts des Großen zur Naturphilosophie und Alchemie, in: Documenti e studi sulla tradizione filosofica medievale 5 (1994) 205–240.
- Philosophische Grundbegriffe des Ps. Dionysius Areopagita in altarmeni¬scher Version, in: Études Augustiniennes. Série Antiquité 151 (1997) 201–223.
- Der Spruch des Apollophanes.- Dietrich von Freiberg über Ps.-Dionysios Areopagites in der Schrift De cognitione entium separatorum. Ein Beitrag zur Diskussion kosmologischer Paradoxien im Mittelalter, in: K.-H. Kandler, B. Mojsisch, F.-B. Stammkötter (Hrsg.), Dietrich von Freiberg, Neue Perspektiven seiner Philosophie, Theologie und Naturwissenschaft (Bochumer Studien zur Philosophie 28) Amsterdam/Philadelphia 1999, 89–119.
- Philosophie der Freiheit im Horizont des Bösen. Zu Friedrich Schlegels Kölner Vorlesungen über Philosophie, in: Philosophy in Global Change. Jubilee volume dedicated to the 65th anniversary of Burkhard Mojsisch. Edited by Tengiz Iremadze in collaboration with Helmut Schneider and Klaus J. Schmidt, Tbilisi 2011, 279–296.
- Medieval Georgian Philosophy in the Context of 19th century European Thought, in: Philosophy and Theology in Mediaeval Georgia, ed. by T. Iremadze, Tbilisi, 2016, S. 113–148.
