= Giorgi Khuroshvili =

Georgian philosopher (born 1988)

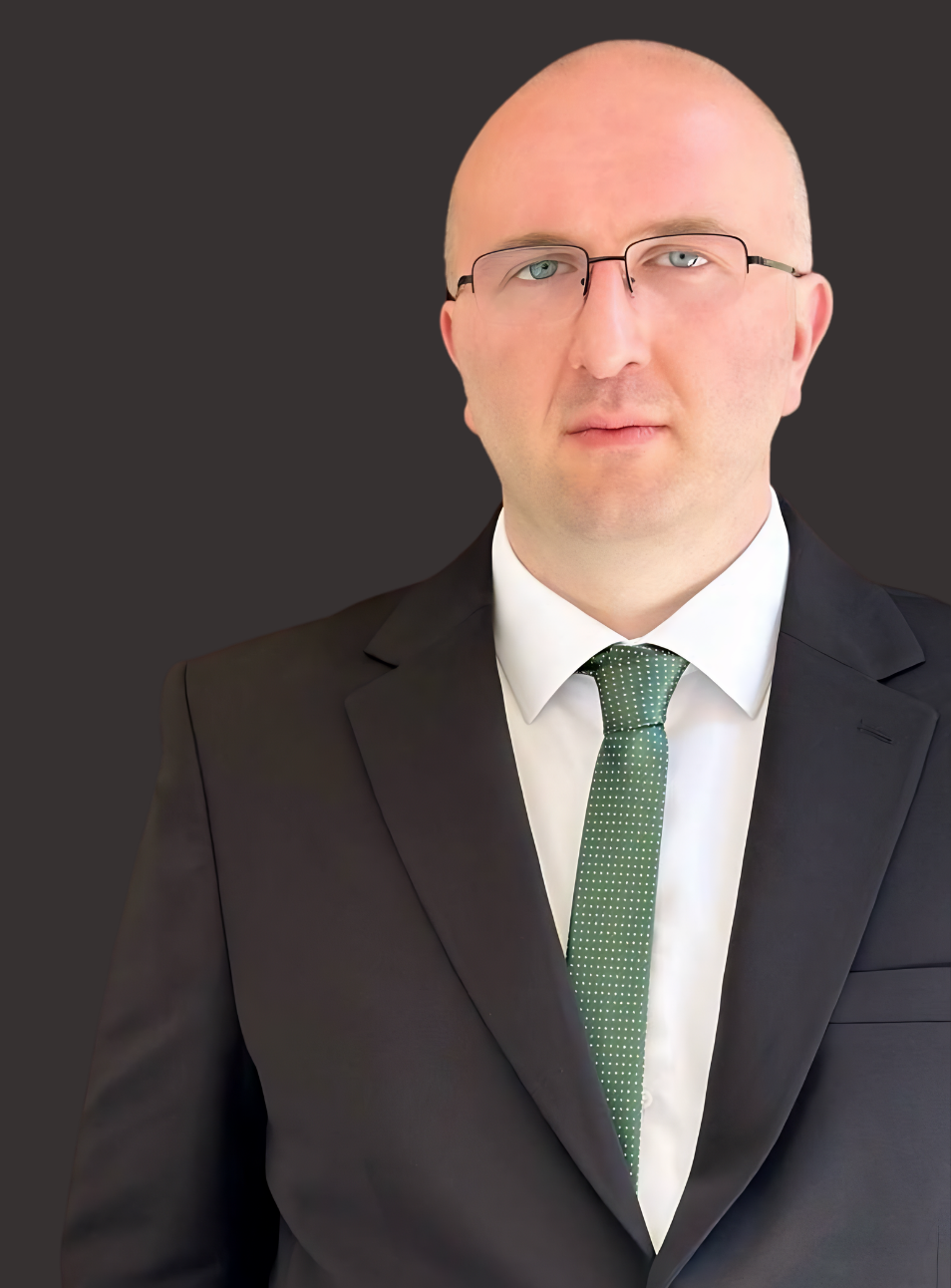
- Born: November 4, 1988 (age 37); Tbilisi, Georgia

Education
- Education: Doctor of Philosophy
- Alma mater: Grigol Robakidze University Adam Mickiewicz University in Poznań

Philosophical work
- Main interests: Political Philosophy, Intercultural Philosophy, Christian Philosophy, History of Georgian Philosophy

Giorgi Khuroshvili (Georgian: გიორგი ხუროშვილი; born November 4, 1988) is a Georgian philosopher and academic. His scholarly work is concerned with political philosophy, Christian philosophy, the history of philosophy, and philosophical theology.

== Biography ==
Giorgi Khuroshvili was born in 1988, Tbilisi, Georgia. He studied Law (B.A.) and Political sciences (M.A.) at Grigol Robakidze University (Georgia). Since 2012, he has been a research fellow at the Institute of Philosophy and Social Sciences in Tbilisi. In 2014–2016 he was a doctoral student of Political Sciences at Adam Mickiewicz University in Poznań (Poland). In 2017 he received his PhD in Philosophy from Grigol Robakidze University for doctoral thesis "Jerusalem and Athens as a Paradigm on Intercultural Philosophy" supervised by Tengiz Iremadze and Helmut Schneider. From 2016 to 2018, he lectured in philosophy and political theory at the same university. Since 2017, he has served as Deputy Director of the Archive of Caucasian Philosophy and Theology at New Georgian University. In 2017–2021 he was an associate professor of philosophy at New Georgian University, in spring 2017 he was a visiting professor at Lazarski University (Warsaw, Poland). Since 2021 Khuroshvili is professor of philosophy at New Georgian University.

Khuroshvili is a member of the editorial board of the academic book series "Philosophy, Sociology, Media Theory", the co-editor of the book series "Philosophy and Social Theory" of the German publishing house "Logos" (Berlin), the editor-in-chief of the Encyclopedia of Georgian Philosophy and Theology, and Editor-in-Chief of the online academic platform Petritsi Portal.

== Work ==
Giorgi Khuroshvili's work focuses on political philosophy, Christian philosophy, history of Georgian philosophy and intercultural philosophy. His research addresses the relationship between philosophical traditions and cultural contexts, as well as the development of philosophical thought within the broader framework of European and Christian intellectual history. A recurring theme in his work is the relationship between Athens and Jerusalem, a concept commonly used in philosophical and theological scholarship to describe the interaction between classical Greek philosophy and the biblical religious tradition. In this context, his studies explore how Christian thought mediates between these two intellectual sources and how this synthesis has shaped philosophical and theological traditions in Christian world.

Khuroshvili has also contributed to the study of Georgian intellectual history through analyses of the reception and transformation of philosophical ideas in medieval and modern Georgia. His work examines the ways in which Georgian thinkers engaged with Byzantine, European, and Christian philosophical traditions, emphasizing the role of intercultural exchange in the formation of Georgian philosophical identity. In this context, he has explored the development of political, ethical, and religious thought in Georgia and its place within broader global philosophical discourse.

Giorgi Khuroshvili is the author, co-author and editor of more than 100 scholarly publications, including books, edited volumes, book chapters, and academic articles. In addition to his scholarly publications, he has contributed to the translation and dissemination of major philosophical and theological works into the Georgian language. Among the thinkers whose writings he has translated and published are Francis Bacon, Hannah Arendt, Leo Strauss, Hans-Georg Gadamer, Thomas Jefferson, Benjamin Franklin, John Adams, Benjamin Rush, James Wilson, Kallistos Ware, Christos Yannaras, John Zizioulas, etc.

== Selected publications ==
=== Books ===
- Logos and Allegory. Christian Philosophy of Justin Martyr and Clement of Alexandria, Nekeri, Tbilisi, 2026. ISBN 978-9941-526-16-9
- At the Crossroads of Reason and Revelation – Aristotle in Maimonides, Nekeri, Tbilisi, 2025. ISBN 978-9941-501-57-9
- Political Theology in Medieval Georgia. Pavoriti Stili, Tbilisi, 2022. ISBN 978-9941-8-4907-7
- Plato in Al-Farabi`s Political Philosophy. Scientific series: East and West. Dialogue between the Cultures, vol. 8, Nekeri, Tbilisi, 2017. ISBN 978-9941-479-13-7
- Jerusalem and Athens. Intercultural and interdisciplinary Context. East and West. Dialogue between the Cultures, vol. 4, Nekeri, Tbilisi, 2015. ISBN 978-9941-457-33-3
- (Co-author) Essays in Political Philosophy, vol. I, Tbilisi: "Nekeri", 2016. ISBN 978-9941-457-76-0
- (Co-author) Essays in Political Philosophy, vol. II, Tbilisi: "Nekeri", 2017. ISBN 978-9941-457-75-3
- (Co-author) Philosophy and Theology in Medieval Georgia, Tbilisi: Pavoriti Stili, 2016. ISBN 978-9941-087-97-4
- (Co-author) Early Modern Georgian Philosophy and its Major Representatives, Tbilisi: Pavoriti Stili, 2014. ISBN 978-9941-0-7227-7
- (Co-author) Philosophical Urbanism, Tbilisi: Publishing House “Nekeri”, 2014. ISBN 978-9941-457-01-2

=== Articles ===
- A Summary View of the Study of Medieval Georgian Political Theology, in: Filosofia E Religione Nella Storia E Nel Presente. Edited by T. Iremadze, A. Marini, H. Schneider, Aracne editrice, 2025, pp. 159-176.
- Philosophy in Independent Georgia, in: Philosophy Unchained. Developments in Post-Soviet Philosophical Thought. Edited by M. Minakov. Foreword by Ch. Donohue, ibidem Press, 2023. pp. 101–121.
- Christian Platonism of Clement of Alexandria, in: At the Origins of Christian Philosophy: Clement of Alexandria, The Cappadocian Fathers, Gaius Marius Victorinus, St. Augustine, Boethius. Ed., by T. Iremadze, H. Schneider, G. Khuroshvili. "Pavoroti Stili", Tbilisi, 2019. pp. 16–25.
- The Dispute Between Bruno Bauer and David Friedrich Strauss Over the Interpretation of Hegel`s Religious Conception, in: Hegel's Philosophy of Religion. Ed., by T. Iremadze, "Pavoroti Stili", Tbilisi, 2019. pp. 185–202
- Conceptions of Political Thought in Medieval Georgia: David IV “the Builder”, Arson of Ikalto. In: Veritas et subtilitas. Truth and Subtlety in the History of Philosophy. John Benjamins Publishing Company. Amsterdam/Philadelphia 2018. pp. 149–156.
- Conflict of the Cities of God and Man in St. Augustine, in: St. Augustine – Teacher of Christianity. Ed., by: T. Iremadze, "Pavoroti Stili", Tbilisi, 2017. pp. 176–185.
- Origins of Hannah Arendt`s Political Thought, in: Hannah Arendt, What is Authority? Translated by Giorgi Khuroshvili. Editors: Tengiz Iremadze, Giorgi Tavadze, etc. Nekeri, Tbilisi, 2015. pp. 7–15.
- Jerusalem and Athens in Medieval Georgian Thought, in: Philosophie und Sozialtheorie, Band 1, Leben verstehen. Herausgegeben von Tengiz Iremadze, Udo Reinhold Jeck, Helmut Schneider. Logos Verlag, Berlin, 2014. S. 97–101.
- Between Plato and Biblical Prophets – Hermann Cohen and Leo Strauss on Jerusalem and Athens, in: East and West (Materials of the International Scientific Conference Dedicated to the 60-year Anniversary of Udo Reinhold Jeck). Editors: Tengiz Iremadze, Guram Tevzadze. “Nekeri,” Tbilisi, 2012, pp. 153–160.
