= 2026 Georgian patriarchal election =

Election of the head of the Georgian Orthodox Church

- 11 May 2026

39 members of the Holy Synod 20 votes needed to win
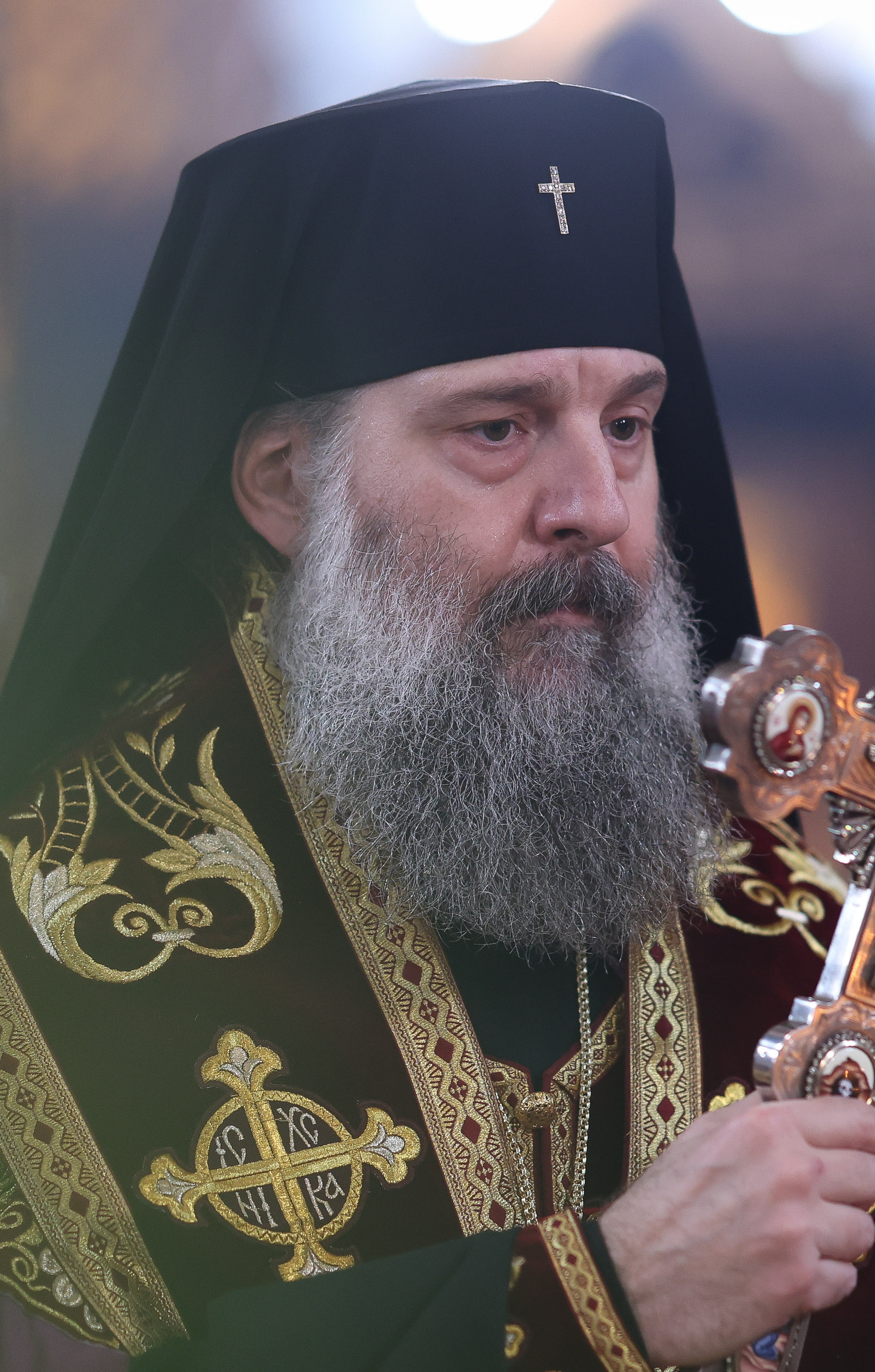

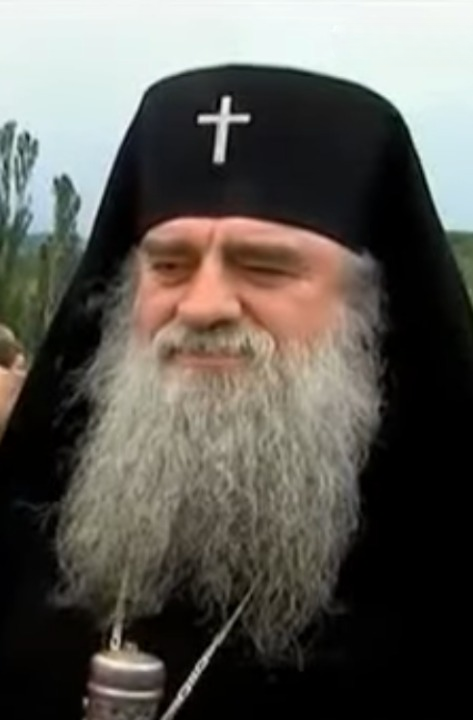

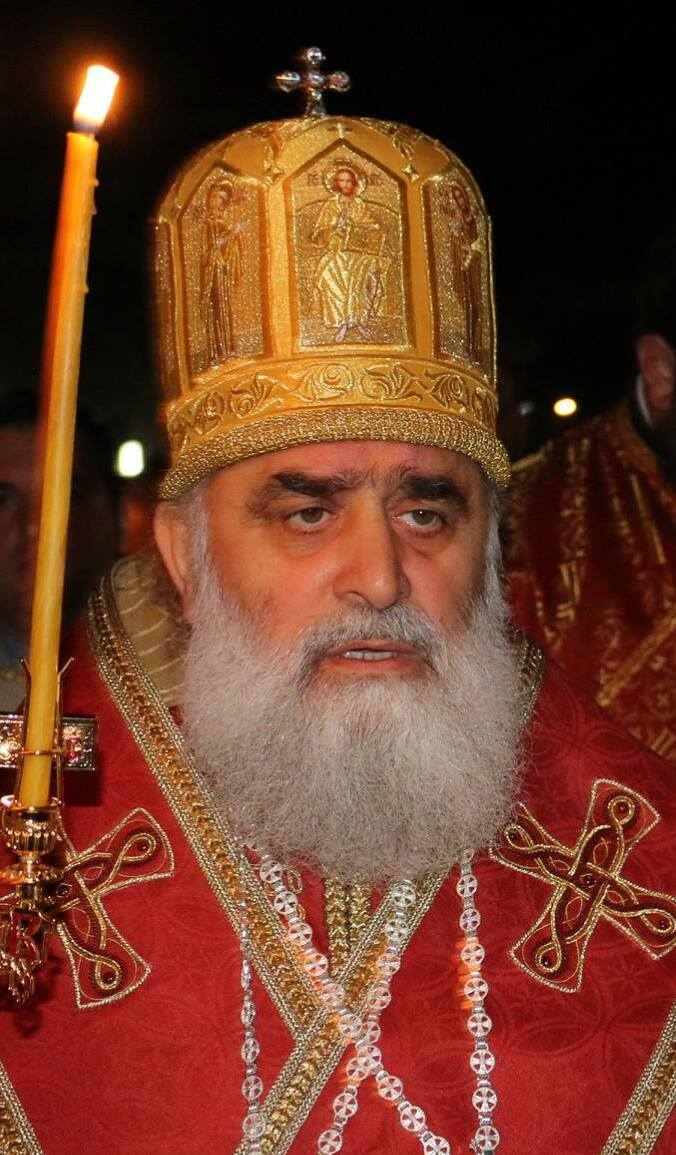
| Candidate | Shio (Mujiri) | Iobi (Akiashvili) | Grigoli (Berbichashvili) |
| Eparchy | Senaki and Chkhorotsku (Note: also Administrator of Australia and New Zealand Eparchy) | Ruisi and Urbnisi | Poti and Khobi |
| Votes | 22 | 9 | 7 |
Patriarch before election
Ilia II
Elected patriarch
Shio III

On 11 May 2026, following the death of Catolichos-Patriarch of All Georgia Ilia II of Georgia, the Holy Synod of the Georgian Orthodox Church held an election to choose a successor. Shio III of Georgia won with 22 votes and ascended to the post from his former role as bishop of Senaki and Chkhorotsku the following day.

== Background ==
Ilia II died at the age of 93 after being hospitalized in critical condition, marking what many observers described as the end of an era in Georgian religious and public life.

He became patriarch in 1977 during the Soviet period, presided over the Church's transformation from a restricted institution into one of the most influential bodies in Georgia. Over time, the Church became closely associated with national identity and enjoyed exceptionally high public trust, with the patriarch widely regarded as a unifying figure across political and social divisions. Ilia II was often described as a conservative leader. Critics, however, pointed to the Church's reluctance to openly criticize the ruling Georgian Dream party.

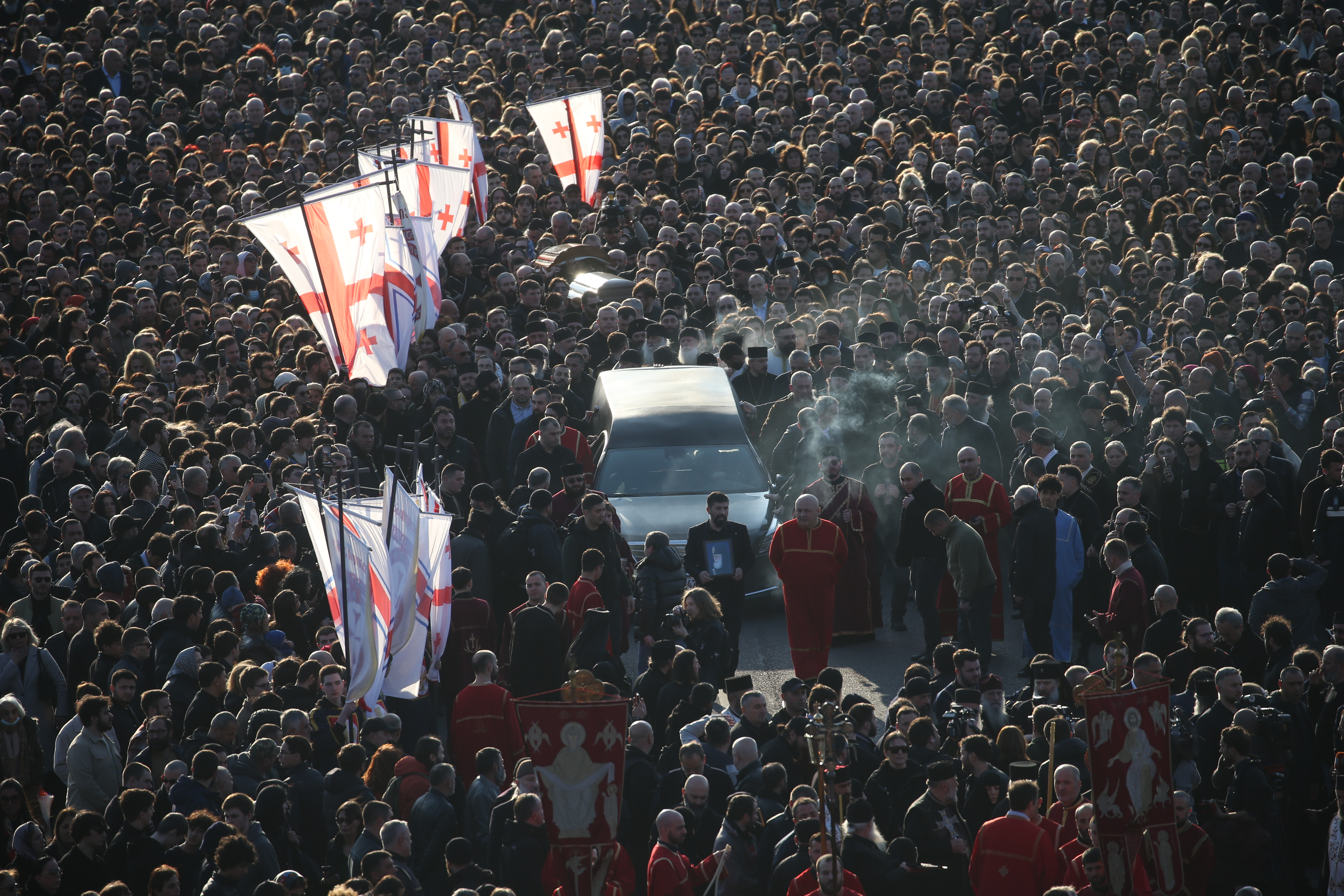
The state funeral procession of Catholicos-Patriarch Ilia II through the streets of Tbilisi, Georgia.

Following his death, the Georgian Orthodox Church initiated the succession process in accordance with its internal statute. The locum tenens, Metropolitan Shio (Mujiri), who had already assumed a leading role in church governance during Ilia II's declining health, became responsible for overseeing the administration of the Church and organizing the election of a new patriarch within the prescribed timeframe.

The election unfolds within a broader institutional and historical context in which the Georgian Orthodox Church occupies a central place in society. With a majority of the population identifying as Orthodox Christians, the Church has remained a key actor not only in religious life but also in shaping cultural norms and national narratives.

At the same time, the transition has drawn increased scrutiny from analysts and observers. Experts have pointed to internal divisions within the Church hierarchy and growing entanglement between religious and political spheres in recent years. Some commentary has highlighted concerns that political actors have sought to instrumentalize religion, contributing to debates over the Church's independence and role in governance.

In addition, the question of external influence, particularly from Russia, has been a recurring theme in discussions surrounding the patriarchal succession. According to analysts, segments of the Georgian clergy have historically maintained connections with figures linked to the Russian Orthodox Church, and the appointment of Metropolitan Shio as locum tenens in 2017 has been associated in some reports with Russian ecclesiastical networks.

As a result, the 2026 patriarchal election has been viewed not only as a religious process but also as an event with broader political and geopolitical implications. Observers suggest that its outcome could influence the future orientation of the Church, including its relationship with the Georgian state, domestic political actors, and external Orthodox networks.

== Electoral system ==
The Holy Synod of the Georgian Orthodox Church nominates three candidates. Each member of the Synod is allowed to name a candidate and the three candidates with the most votes will be presented to the Extended Council of the GOC. The Locum Tenens must convene the council no sooner than forty days and no later than two months after the start of the vacancy. If no candidate receives the majority of the votes, a second round between the two candidates with the most votes will be held. Metropolitan bishop Shio Mujiri was appointed Locum.

To be eligible, the candidate has to be ethnically Georgian, a monk and a bishop of the GOC, have a theological education and sufficient experience in church governance and be between the ages of 40 and 70. While the specific requirements for the level of theological education and the reference date for the age limit were previously points of discussion, these have since been resolved, and the core education and age rules remained the same.

== Candidates ==
Out of the 39 members of the Holy Synod, 30 are within the allowed age range. 14 of the bishops did not have a theological education necessary for a candidacy.

=== Locum Metropolitan Shio (Mujiri) ===
Metropolitan Shio by the decision of Catholicos-Patriarch Ilia II, he has carried the title of locum tenens of the Patriarchal throne for nine years. He studied cello at the Tbilisi State Conservatory. In 2003 he became the ruling bishop of the Eparchy of Senaki and Chkhorotsqu.

He was frequently described as the front-runner in the election and was widely viewed as the favorite of the Georgian Dream government. Known for his anti-Western and conservative rhetoric, outside observers assessed him as a candidate acceptable to both the current Georgian government and Russian Orthodox Church. His ties to Russia are notable: he is a former rector of the St. George Church of the Georgian Community in Moscow and an alumnus of Saint Tikhon's Orthodox University. Despite these credentials, some experts suggest had struggled to secure strong personal support among his fellow Synod members.

Questions about his relationship with the Russian church were raised by various observers, partly in connection with a visit by Russian Metropolitan Hilarion Alfeyev to Georgia shortly before Shio was named locum tenens, a link the Patriarchate's spokesman Archpriest Andria Jagmaidze firmly rejected. Metropolitan Zenon (Iarajuli) stated openly that while Shio was not necessarily Russia's candidate, Russia supported him, that he would not be receiving his vote, and that he considered Metropolitan Shio "dangerous for the Church of Georgia as a Patriarch."

He also shares a long-standing friendship Levan Vasadze, known for his nationalist and socially conservative views; Vasadze's political activities were viewed favorably by Kremlin-linked propagandist Aleksandr Dugin. After the July 5, 2021 violence against Tbilisi Pride participants, he declined to condemn the attacks, instead proposing that Georgia should outlaw "insulting religious and national feelings." Admired in conservative circles for his emphasis on Christianity in national identity, he was nonetheless viewed by others with concern over his ultraconservative positions and potential openness to Russian ecclesiastical influence.

=== Metropolitan Iobi (Akiashvili) ===
Metropolitan Iobi comes from the village of Sno in the Kazbegi Municipality, the same village as Catholicos-Patriarch Ilia II. He enrolled in the economics faculty of the Georgian Agricultural Institute in 1978, and during his student years served as a sticharion at the Sioni Cathedral. He has headed the Eparchy of Ruisi and Urbnisi since 1996.

He was considered Shio's primary rival and shared his conservative views. His influence was bolstered by the number of Synod members who had begun their clerical service under him; there were at least five such bishops in the Synod. Known for controversial conspiracy rhetoric, he claimed electronic ID cards bore "the mark of the Antichrist," described the COVID-19 epidemic as "artificially imposed," alleged that elites received a different vaccine than ordinary citizens, and preached that a person of true faith would not contract the virus - though he himself was later hospitalized with coronavirus.

Iobi had publicly called for the restoration of the monarchy in Georgia under the Bagrationi dynasty, a stance supported by circulating photos of him meeting with David Bagration-Mukhrani and the young Crown Prince Giorgi Bagrationi.

On Russia, his positions were contradictory: a magazine published under his blessing framed the 2008 war as divine punishment for Georgia's Western orientation, yet he also claimed he had nearly anathematized Putin and Medvedev over the burning of Georgian villages. In 2018 he publicly accused the Georgian Dream government of working against the church and deliberately promoting drug addiction in the country. He cursed and excommunicated journalist Giorgi Gabunia, called for clergy to "go first" if bloodshed became necessary over the David Gareji dispute with Azerbaijan, and described Muslims as bearing "the spiritual mark" of the devil.

=== Metropolitan Grigoli (Berbichashvili) ===
Metropolitan Grigoli holds a doctorate in philosophy and is a professor. Within the Patriarchate, he chairs the Department of Publishing and Peer Review. He studied in Ukraine at the Kryvyi Rih Civil Aviation School, and has served as Metropolitan of Poti and Khobi since 1996.

Grigoli was regarded as a heavy-weight candidate due to his significant authority and influence within the Holy Synod. Because of his frequent criticism of the current government, he is often characterized as a pro-Western candidate. He is also among the few hierarchs who have publicly supported the autocephaly of the Orthodox Church of Ukraine.

On Russia, his positions were largely consistent: he described the 1921 Soviet occupation as an "insidious and treacherous act," characterized Russia's war in Ukraine as an attempt to erase an independent state from the face of the earth, and maintained that Russia's interests should not determine Georgia's positions, including on ecclesiastical matters in Abkhazia and South Ossetia, where he acknowledged the limits of Georgian control while cautioning against linking unrelated issues.

On domestic matters, he wrote that every day Mikheil Saakashvili spent in prison acted to the detriment of Georgia's national interests, condemned the July 5, 2021 violence against Tbilisi Pride participants as unbecoming of Christians, and during the 2023-2024 protests against the "Agents Law" defended the younger generation against blanket criticism, describing them as sincere and courageous. He has also addressed the role of women, arguing that a society which fails to value women is itself unable to create anything of worth.

=== Other contenders ===
Metropolitan Isaiah (Chanturia) was often cited as a strong and popular figure among the clergy and the public. however, his candidacy was ultimately blocked because he lacked the specific theological degree required by church statutes.

Metropolitan Daniel (Datuashvili) was another prominent and influential candidate who holds one of the highest ranks within the ecclesiastical hierarchy. Although his patriarchal ambitions have long been recognized throughout the Church, but his candidacy was ultimately disqualified because he had surpassed the age limit of 70. Along with Iobi, Daniel was viewed by some observers as a relatively moderate alternative to Shio.

The Russian Foreign Intelligence Service accused the Ecumenical Patriarchate of Constantinople of backing the Metropolitans Abraham (Garmelia) and Grigoli (Berbichashvili), the former being above the maximum age to be eligible.

On April 28, 2026, at the meeting of the Synod of the Orthodox Church, several candidates for the patriarchate were named, and three candidates were chosen from among them: Shio Mujiri, Grigol Berbichashvili and Iobi Akiashvili.

== Conduct ==
The Holy Synod of the Georgian Orthodox Church was originally scheduled to meet on 24 April. According to the Press Office of the Patriarchate of Georgia, the session of the Holy Synod, where three candidates for the Patriarchate will be selected, was later set to take place on April 28.

On April 28, 2026, during the session of the Synod of the Orthodox Church, several candidates for the Patriarchate were nominated, from which three were selected: Shio (Mujiri), with 20 votes; Grigol (Berbichashvili), with 7 votes; and Iob (Akiashvili), also with 7 votes. The session was attended by 38 high-ranking hierarchs (1 absent), with the remaining four votes distributed among other candidates and two bishops abstaining.

Although 10–12 individuals were originally considered, only six ultimately stood for election as others declined. Notably, Bishops Daniel Datuashvili and Isaiah Chanturia were barred from voting following deliberations regarding age requirements.

In the upcoming Extended Council, which will take place on May 11, 2026, at 1:00 p.m. in Tbilisi, at the Holy Trinity Cathedral, Shio enters as the overwhelming front-runner. Unless at least one of his current supporters defects in the first round, his 20 votes are sufficient for an outright victory making a second round possible only if his support drops to 19 or below, and potentially making him Shio III, the 153rd Catholicos-Patriarch of All Georgia.

| Candidate | Holy Synod | | Extended Council | |
| Candidate | Votes | % | Votes | % |
|---|---|---|---|---|
| Shio (Mujiri) | 20 | 52.63 | 22 | 56.41 |
| Iobi (Akiashvili) | 7 | 18.42 | 9 | 23.08 |
| Grigoli (Berbichashvili) | 7 | 18.42 | 7 | 17.95 |
| Grigol (Katsia) | 1 | 2.63 | | |
| Dositheos (Bogveradze) | 1 | 2.63 | | |
| Melkisedek (Khachidze) | 0 | 0.00 | | |
| Abstain/Invalid | 2 | 5.26 | 1 | 2.56 |
| Total | 38 | 100.00 | 39 | 100.00 |
| Registered voters/turnout | 39 | – | | |
Source: Radio Free Europe / Radio Liberty, OC Media

== Controversies and irregularities ==
=== Exclusion of Metropolitan Isaiah from Patriarchal Candidacy ===
After the declaration of candidates, the Patriarchate published Metropolitan Isaiah's appeal alongside the minutes of the Synod meeting. In it, he argued that his decades of hands-on diocesan experience should outweigh his lack of a formal academic diploma, a requirement he said he was unable to meet "due to the country's instability during his years of study." He further contended that his 1995 ordination as bishop had already confirmed his readiness for the high priesthood. Nevertheless, the Holy Synod excluded both him and Metropolitan Daniel from the candidate list, citing strict adherence to the Church statute's age and education criteria.

The decision drew varied responses from within the clergy. Metropolitan Nikoloz (Pachuashvili) defended Isaiah as a "hero of our time" who had chosen to defend the homeland and Church during the war rather than pursue a formal diploma, calling the Synod's ruling incorrect. Metropolitan Grigol (Berbichashvili), while acknowledging that all bishops are equal regardless of academic credentials, suggested that Isaiah's case warranted specific deliberation rather than blanket exclusion. Metropolitan Zenon went further, stating during the Synod itself that the exclusion was an insult and that its members were "humiliating" the Metropolitan; he added that Isaiah would have made an excellent candidate on the strength of his personal qualities, though he noted the appeal had perhaps come too late. Isaiah himself maintained that applying the theological education requirement in a purely formal manner presents an incomplete picture of a candidate's fitness for the throne. Echoing this sentiment, Metropolitan Iobi (Akiashvili) called for broader reform, arguing that the Church statutes should be revised to remove restrictions on both theological diplomas and age, and personally expressing his wish that both Metropolitans Daniel and Isaiah had been permitted to stand in the election.

=== Metropolitan Iobi's Diploma Disappearance ===
On May 4, 2026, Synod member Bishop Giorgi (Jamdeliani) announced that the seminary diploma of Metropolitan Iobi, a candidate in the patriarchal election, had gone missing from his episcopal residence, and expressed suspicion that it had been stolen. The disappearance initially cast doubt on his candidacy, as possession of a valid diploma was a statutory requirement for eligibility. Bishop Giorgi noted that during the Synod session for candidate selection, they had turned to the former rector of the Mtskheta Theological Seminary, Metropolitan Zosime, who confirmed that the diploma had been issued. The Theological Academy subsequently also recognized Metropolitan Iobi's educational credentials.

In his first public comment on the matter, Metropolitan Iobi himself confirmed that his documents had been stolen. When summoned by the Patriarchate to submit his papers as a candidate, he went to retrieve them and found that both his secular and religious educational documents were gone. Asked whether the theft was connected to his candidacy, he declined to draw a direct link, leaving the question open.

== Influence by external actors ==
Locum Shio (Mujiri) previously came out against recognising the autocephaly of the Orthodox Church of Ukraine. According to Levan Sutidze (Editor of Tabula) he would increase Russian influence in the GOC. The Russian Foreign Intelligence Service accused the Ecumenical Patriarch of Constantinople Bartholomew I of trying to interfere in the election. The head of GOC's public relations service Andria Jagmaidze stated that "such interference by an autocephalous church is unimaginable for us."

There had been concerns that the Georgian government would try to interfere. Gia Gachechiladze called anyone who would not endorse Shio (Mujiri) a "traitor". Metropolitan Zenon (Iarajuli) called the authorities "not to allow themselves to interfere in the Church’s internal election" though he said that the state would be unlikely to intervene. Giga Parulava from For Georgia called both opposition and governing parties to restrain from influencing the election.

On 8 April 2026, archpriest Igor Yakimchuk, deputy chairman of the Department for External Church Relations of the Russian Orthodox Church reaffirmed support of the canonical borders of the Georgian Orthodox Church by the ROC. He stated that the ROC would maintain this position and that the change of the political borders does not means the change of the religious ones. Yakimchuk noted that the Abkhazians expelled the Georgian and Greek population during the 1992-1993 war, forcing entire Georgian priesthood to flee. He said that the original population of Abkhazia which constructed its churches was Georgian, while the current Abkhazian population are Adygeans, which came later and brought Islamic influence. He elaborated that the name "Abkhazian" is used by two different peoples. The secessionist Foreign Ministry of Abkhazia condemned this statement, but it was welcomed by the chairman of the Government of the Autonomous Republic of Abkhazia Jemal Gamakharia. Some have interpreted this as an attempt to reduce the anti-Russian sentiments in Georgia prior to the patriarchal election, while also securing the support of the new patriarch not to revisit the Georgian Orthodox Church's non-recognition of the Ukrainian autocephaly.
