= New Georgian University =

Research University in Georgia (country)

- ახალი საქართველოს უნივერსიტეტი
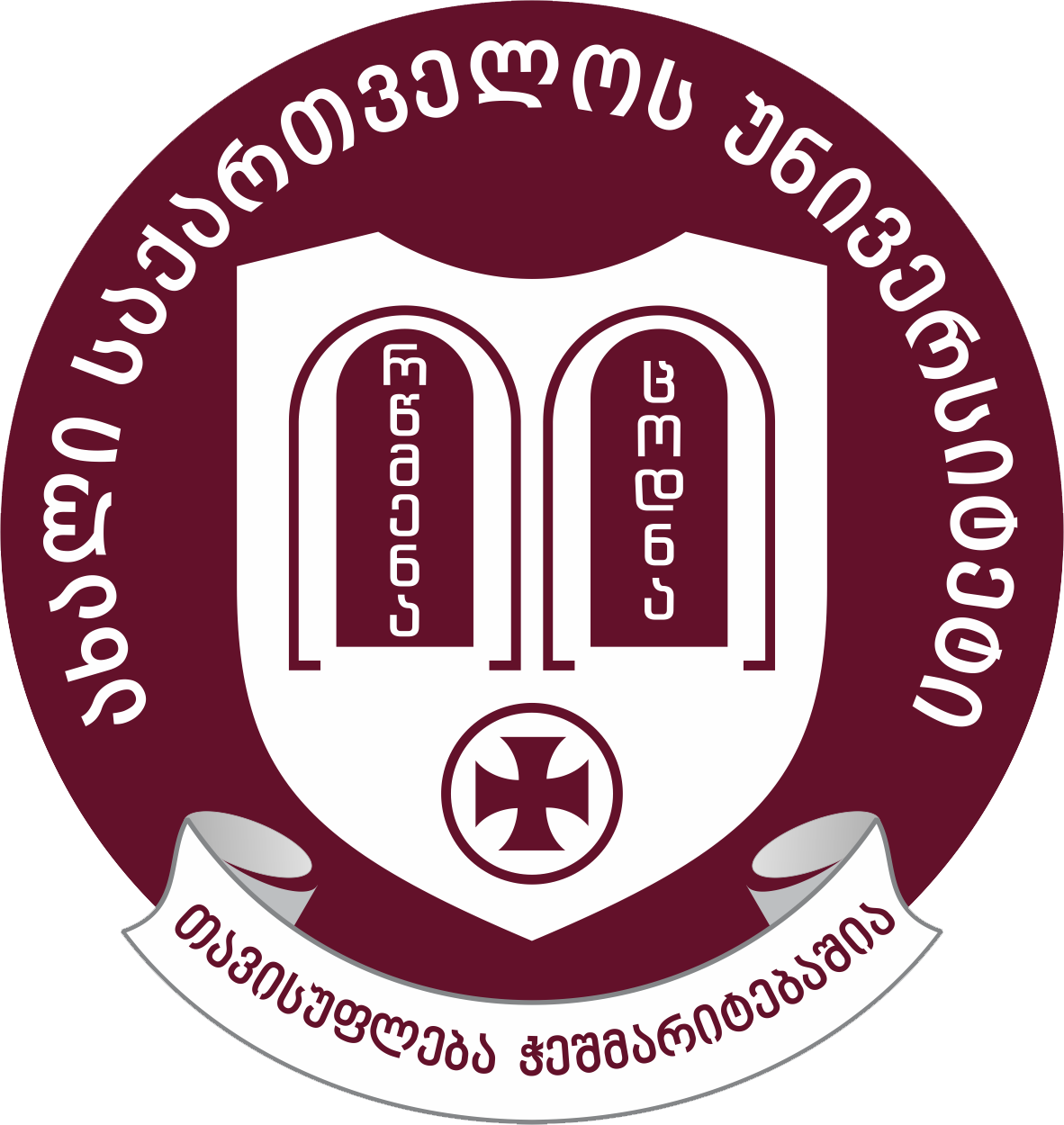
- Motto: "Freedom is in Truth"
- Type: Research University
- Established: 2015; 11 years ago
- Accreditation: Higher education accreditation from Ministry of Education and Science of Georgia
- Rector: Metropolitan Grigoli Berbichashvili
- Location: Guria Str. # 1., Poti, Georgia
- Campus: Urban
- Website: ngu.edu.ge/en

New Georgian University is a research university in Poti, Georgia (country). The university was established in 2015 under the patronage of the Apostolic Autocephalous Orthodox Church of Georgia. The university provides academic programs in Christian philosophy and Christian psychology.

== Brief history ==
New Georgian University was founded with the blessing of Catholicos-Patriarch of All Georgia and with the effort of the Metropolitan of Poti and Khobi Grigoli (Berbichashvili). On 14 December 2015, university received state authorization and accreditation and was granted the status of university, which enables it to run higher education programs and conduct scientific research. New Georgian University offers MA and PhD programs in Christian Philosophy, and Christian Psychology. The University has partners in several countries including Germany, United States, Italy, Greece etc.

== Faculty of Humanities and Social Sciences ==
The Faculty of Humanities and Social Sciences is a major educational and administrative unit of the New Georgian University, currently it has 28 faculty members and offers the graduate and PhD programs.

Degree programs:

- MA in Christian Philosophy / Degree: Master of Philosophy – 2 years (4 semesters).
- MA in Christian Psychology / Degree: Master of Psychology – 2 years (4 semesters).
- PhD in Christian Philosophy / Degree: Doctor of Philosophy – 3 years (6 semesters).

Non-degree program:

- Continuing Education Program in Christian Studies – 1 year.

The university's faculty includes scholars and clergy from the fields of philosophy, theology, and the humanities. Among its notable academic staff are Metropolitan Grigoli (Berbichashvili); Professor Tengiz Iremadze, whose work focuses on the philosophy of mind and Christian philosophy; Professor Udo Reinhold Jeck, whose research specializes in medieval philosophy and Byzantine philology; Professor Giacomo Rinaldi, whose work addresses theoretical and moral philosophy; Professor Helmut Schneider, whose research encompasses German Idealism and intercultural philosophy; and Professor Giorgi Khuroshvili, whose research focuses on Christian philosophy and the history of Georgian philosophy.

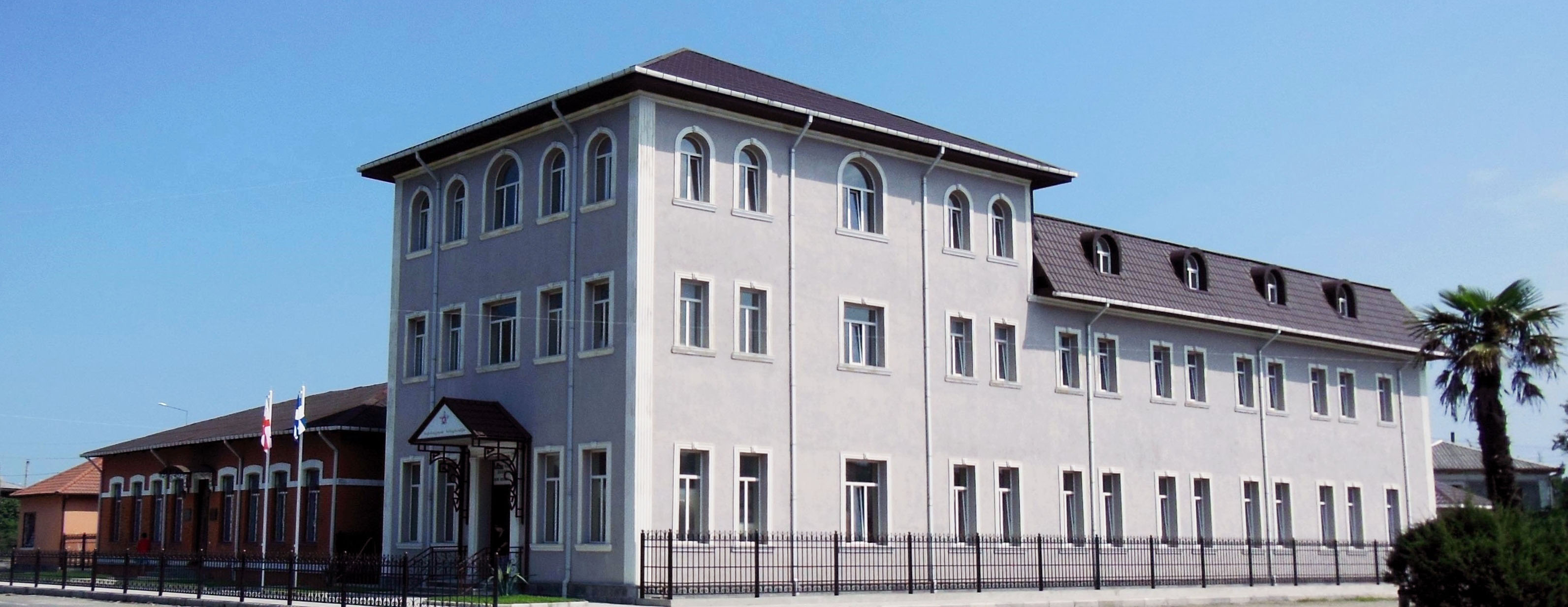
New Georgian University Campus in Poti

The university has conferred honorary doctorates upon several distinguished theologians and philosophers, including Metropolitan Kallistos (Ware) of Diokleia, Metropolitan John (Zizioulas) of Pergamon, The Very Rev. Chad Hatfield, Christos Yannaras, and Richard Swinburne.

== Archive of Caucasian Philosophy and Theology ==
The Archive of Caucasian Philosophy and Theology coordinates the academic research process at the university. Director of the Archive is professor Tengiz Iremadze. Archive aims to provide the thorough study of the rich theoretical heritage of Caucasus region; it promotes and popularizes Georgian philosophical and theological traditions in contemporary global world, develops new academic and research tools in Christian philosophy and theology, supports young researchers in philosophy and theology. Since 2015 the Archive has published more than 80 books. The main research areas of the Archive are: Christian philosophy, Christian theology, history of Georgian philosophy, intercultural philosophy, political theology, philosophical anthropology and neurophilosophy.

=== Library ===
The library houses collections of theological and philosophical literature in Georgian and foreign languages (canonical texts, classical and contemporary texts of the history of philosophy, works of the Church Fathers, medieval Georgian and foreign authors, and contemporary Orthodox theologians). Under the direction of the Archive of Caucasian Philosophy and Theology the library is periodically enriched with private book collections of philosophers and theologians from the Caucasus region.

== Academic projects ==
Petritsi Portal is the academic online platform of the New Georgian University. The name of the portal originates from the great medieval Georgian philosopher Ioane Petritsi. The portal brings together Georgian and foreign researchers working in the fields of philosophy, theology and social sciences. Portal regularly publishes new translations, academic papers and reviews in philosophy, theology and psychology.

The Encyclopedia of Georgian Philosophy and Theology is an online academic project developed on the basis of the Archive of Caucasian Philosophy and Theology. The encyclopedia includes articles on outstanding Georgian philosophers and theologians, as well as articles about schools, branches and concepts of Georgian philosophy and theology. The authors of the articles published in the encyclopedia are well-known Georgian and foreign scholars.
