= Khuroshvili =

Khuroshvili (Georgian: ხუროშვილი) is a Georgian surname. Notable people with the surname include:

- Giorgi Khuroshvili (born 1988), Georgian philosopher
- Valeryan Khuroshvili (born 1979), Belarusian swimmer
