= Tengiz Iremadze =

Georgian philosopher (born 1973)

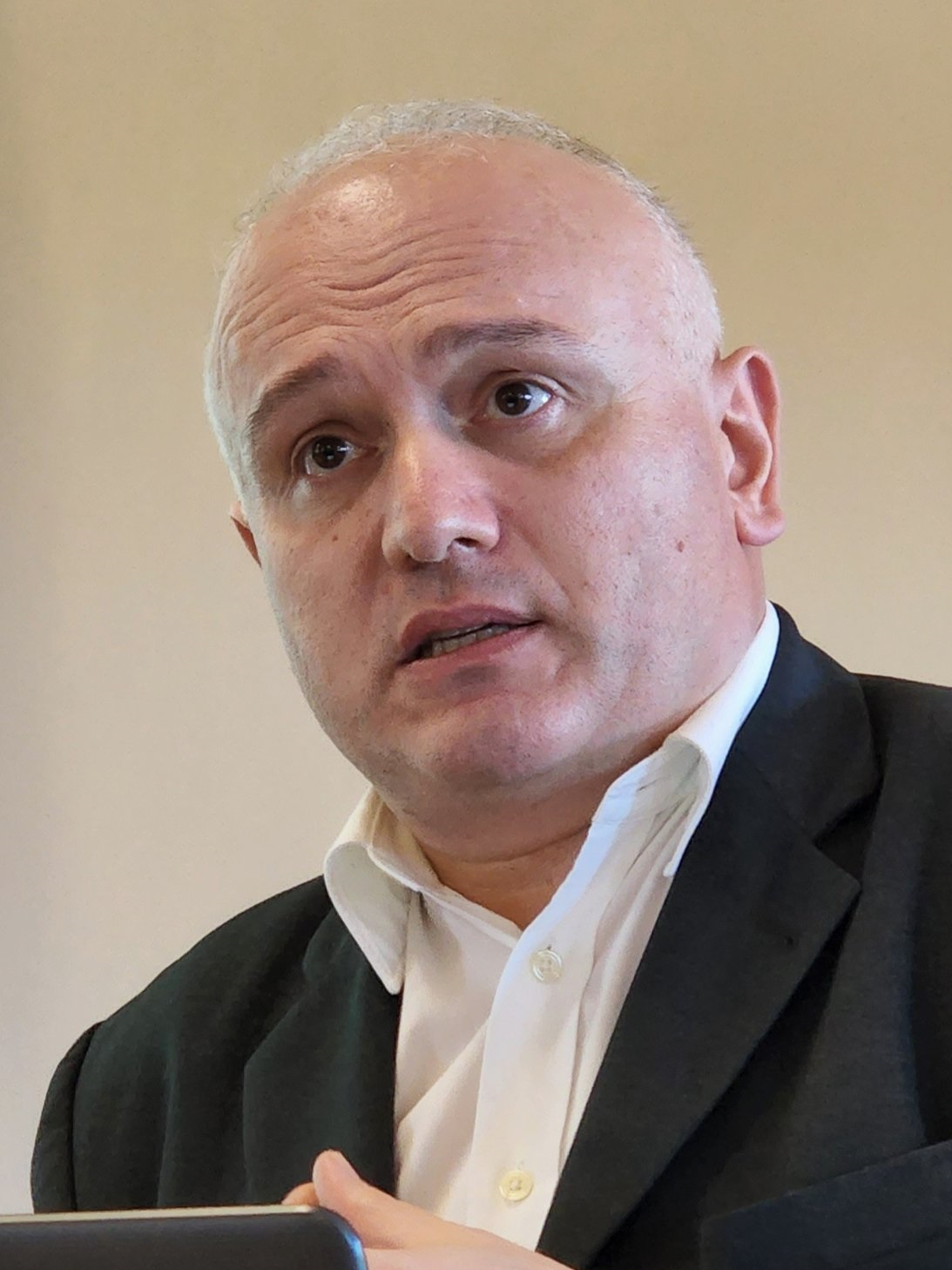
- Born: March 9, 1973 (age 53)

Education
- Education: Doctor of Philosophy
- Alma mater: Ruhr University Bochum; Tbilisi State University

Philosophical work
- Institutions: New Georgian University
- Main interests: Philosophy of mind Christian philosophy ancient philosophy philosophy of war and peace sociology of terrorism

Tengiz Iremadze (Georgian: თენგიზ ირემაძე, German: Tengis Iremadse; born March 9, 1973) is a Georgian philosopher. His major fields of study are philosophy of mind (theory of intellect), Christian philosophy, philosophy of war and peace, sociology of terror, sociology of media and philosophical urbanism. He pays special attention to medieval, early modern and contemporary Georgian and European philosophy.

Tengiz Iremadze`s work is dedicated to ancient philosophy (Pythagoras, Plato, Aristotle) and to the late antiquity (Proclus), also to medieval Georgian and Latin Christian thought (Ioane Petritsi, Theodoric of Freiberg, Berthold of Moosburg). In addition, he translated the works of Gottfried Wilhelm Leibniz, Walter Benjamin, Hans Blumenberg, André Glucksmann and Ernst Meister into the Georgian language. He is the editor of the Georgian translations of the works of Friedrich Nietzsche, Alexis de Tocqueville, Thomas Paine, Benjamin Franklin, Thomas Jefferson, James Wilson, Benjamin Rush, John Dewey, Henri Bergson, Carl Schmitt, Leo Strauss, Hannah Arendt and Niklas Luhmann, etc.

== Biography ==
Tengiz Iremadze studied philosophy and sociology at Ivane Javakhishvili Tbilisi State University from 1993 to 1998. From his academic teachers especially noteworthy is Georgian philosopher Guram Tevzadze. In his diploma thesis Tengiz Iremadze gave an interpretation of Nietzsche's "Thus Spoke Zarathustra".

In 2003, he earned his PhD degree in philosophy at Ruhr University Bochum under the supervision of German philosopher Burkhard Mojsisch (1944-2015). His PhD thesis was "Conceptions of Thought in Neo-Platonism. The Reception of Proclus' Philosophy in Medieval German and Georgian Thought. Dietrich of Freiberg - Berthold of Moosburg - Ioane Petritsi."

Since 2007, Tengiz Iremadze is professor of philosophy and social sciences at Grigol Robakidze University (Tbilisi, Georgia) and the director of the Institute of Philosophy and Social Sciences of the same university. In 2015, he became professor of philosophy at New Georgian University (Poti, Georgia), and is the director of the Archive of Caucasian Philosophy and Theology of the same university. Tengiz Iremadze is also chief editor and publisher of number of philosophical series in Georgia and Europe. Since 2014, together with German philosophers Udo Reinhold Jeck and Helmut Schneider, he publishes scientific series "Philosophy and Social Theory" (Berlin, Publishing House "Logos").

== Work ==
=== Intercultural context of the history of philosophy ===
Already in his PhD thesis (2003), Tengiz Iremadze paid special attention to the concept of intercultural philosophy. In this work he analyzed the history of the reception of one of the central concepts (theory of thought) of outstanding thinker of late antiquity Proclus in medieval Latin West. At the same time in his study he incorporated old Georgian texts referring to the "Elements of Theology" (Ioane Petritsi's translation and commentary of this work of Proclus).

=== Caucasian philosophy ===
Tengiz Iremadze developed this direction of research in his work "Philosophy at the Crossroads of Epochs and Cultures" (2013). In this work Tengiz Iremadze combined historical studies and systematic analysis and developed methodological preconditions and bases of "Caucasian Philosophy". This work can be divided into three parts: in the introductory reflections Tengiz Iremadze develops methodological grounds and discusses the key concept of the "crossroad" from different perspectives. In the first part of the work is given the phenomenology of the "crossroad" from the important perspective of intercultural thought, in the second part he discusses basic philosophical concepts [Being/Beings, Truth/Interpretation, Reception/Transformation, Individualism/Intersubjectivity, Knowledge/Wisdom], which have been not only important throughout the history of philosophy, but will also have a great value in the future. In the third part Iremadze discusses new concepts of intercultural thought. The concept of "crossroad" also plays important role here, because it underpins new intercultural philosophical theory.

== Books ==
- Konzeptionen des Denkens im Neuplatonismus. Zur Rezeption der Proklischen Philosophie im deutschen und georgischen Mittelalter: Dietrich von Freiberg – Berthold von Moosburg – Joane Petrizi (Bochumer Studien zur Philosophie, Bd. 40), Amsterdam/Philadelphia: B. R. Grüner Publishing Company, 2004. ISBN 9789060323694.
- Friedrich Nietzsche: "Thus Spoke Zarathustra": Text and Context, Tbilisi: Publishing House "Nekeri", 2006. ISBN 99940-890-1-3
- Der Aletheiologische Realismus. Schalwa Nuzubidse und seine neuen Denkansätze, Tbilisi: Verlag "Nekeri", 2008. ISBN 978-9941-404-41-2.
- Walter Benjamin. Life – Work – Actuality, Tbilisi: Publishing House "Nekeri", 2008. ISBN 978-9941-404-20-7
- (Co-author) What is Freedom? Great Thinkers on the Essence of Freedom. Charles-Louis Montesquieu, Jean-Jacques Rousseau, Georg Wilhelm Friedrich Hegel, Herbert Spencer, Erich Fromm, Tbilisi: Publishing House "Nekeri", First edition, 2010, ISBN 978-9941-416-71-2; Second edition - 2013: ISBN 978-9941-436-82-6
- Philosophy at the Crossroads of Epochs and Cultures, Tbilisi: Publishing House "Nekeri", 2013. ISBN 978-9941-436-55-0
- (Co-author) Early Modern Georgian Philosophy and its Major Representatives (second half of the 18th century – second half of the 19th century), Scientific editor: T. Iremadze, Tbilisi: Pavoriti Stili, 2014. ISBN 978-9941-0-7227-7
- (Co-author) Philosophical Urbanism, editor: T. Iremadze, H. Schneider, Tbilisi: Publishing House "Nekeri", 2014. ISBN 978-9941-457-01-2
- Pythagoras in the Context of Caucasian Philosophy, Tbilisi: Publishing House "Nekeri", 2014. ISBN 978-9941-457-32-6
- Friedrich Nietzsche's Philosophy and Perspectives of Understanding It, Tbilisi: Publishing House "Nekeri", 2015. ISBN 978-9941-457-36-4
- Religion - Tolerance - State, Tbilisi: Publishing House "Nekeri", 2016. ISBN 978-9941-457-66-1
- Medieval Georgian Philosophy. A Systematic Outline to Understand its Specifics. Tbilisi: Pavoriti Stili, 2019. ISBN 978-9941-8-1633-8
- Early Modern Georgian Philosophy. A Systematic Outline to Understand its Specifics. Tbilisi: Pavoriti Stili, 2020. ISBN 978-9941-8-2898-0
- Ioane Petritsi`s Philosophy. Tbilisi: Pavoriti Stili, 2021. ISBN 978-9941-8-3091-4
- Medieval philosophy. Tbilisi: Pavoriti Stili, 2022. ISBN 978-9941-8-4761-5
- Shalva Nutsubidze`s Philosophy. A brief systematic-critical analysis, Tbilisi: Publishing House "Nekeri", 2023. ISBN 978-9941-501-62-3
- Post-Humanistic Philosophy. Mutually Intersecting Contexts of the Crisis and Destruction of the Great Ideas, Tbilisi: Pavorti Stili, 2023. ISBN 978-9941-8-5884-0
- Philosophical Theology In Medieval Georgia, Tbilisi: Publishing House "Nekeri", 2024. ISBN 978-9941-501-78-4
- Philosophical Theology in Early Modern Georgia, Tbilisi: Publishing House "Nekeri", 2025. ISBN 978-9941-501-95-1
- The Christian Theology of David IV the Builder, Tbilisi: Publishing House "Nekeri", 2025. ISBN 978-9941-501-97-5
- Bishop Gabriel Kikodze. Philosophy and Psychology, Tbilisi: Publishing House "Nekeri", 2025. ISBN 978-9941-479-30-4
- Solomon Dodashvili`s Philosophy. A Brief Systematic Analysis, Tbilisi: Publishing House "Nekeri", 2025. ISBN 978-9941-501-99-9
