= Helmut Schneider (philosopher) =

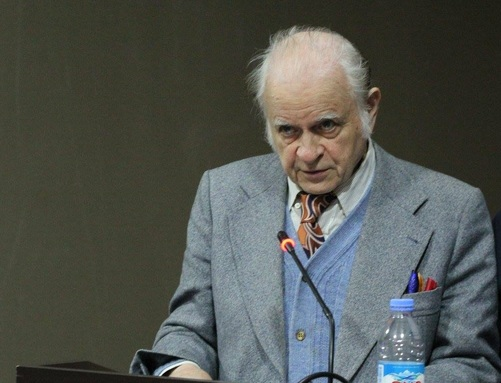
- Born: July 2, 1938 (age 88)
- Citizenship: Germany
- Occupation: Professor of Philosophy

Academic work
- Discipline: Philosophy
- Sub-discipline: German Idealism, Philosophy of Religion, History of Philosophy, Intercultural philosophy
- Institutions: New Georgian University, University of Kassel

Helmut Schneider (born July 2, 1938) is a German philosopher, historian of philosophy, and Hegel scholar known for his work on the critical edition of the writings of Georg Wilhelm Friedrich Hegel, the history of German Idealism, and intercultural philosophy. He served for many years at the Hegel Archive in Bochum and was Director of the Archive from 1988 to 2003. Schneider is particularly noted for several important discoveries relating to Hegelian textual scholarship and for his contributions to international Hegel studies.

== Academic career ==
Schneider's academic career has been closely connected with the Hegel Archive at Ruhr University Bochum, one of the principal centers for the historical-critical study of Hegel's works. The Archive, founded in 1958 and transferred to Bochum in 1968, became the institutional center of the critical edition of Hegel's collected writings. Schneider was among the scholars involved in this project and later served as Director of the Hegel Archive between 1988 and 2003. In 1999 he completed a habilitation thesis at the University of Wrocław entitled Geist und Geschichte: Studien zur Philosophie Hegels ("Spirit and History: Studies on Hegel's Philosophy").

Schneider is privatdozent at the University of Kassel. From 2009 onward he was associated with Grigol Robakidze University as a full professor and headed the Department of History of Philosophy within its Institute of Philosophy and Social Sciences, with particular emphasis on German Idealism and aesthetics. Since 2017 he serves as Professor of Philosophy at New Georgian University and is Research Fellow of Archive of Caucasian Philosophy and Theology at the same university.

== Work ==
Schneider's research focuses primarily on Hegel, German Idealism, the history of philosophy, aesthetics, and intercultural philosophy. His scholarship combines textual-historical investigation with systematic philosophical interpretation. He has published studies on Hegel's logic, philosophy of religion, political thought, and concept of freedom, while also contributing to research on medieval Christian thought and intercultural philosophical dialogue.

In 1991, he founded the Society for the Study of Asian Philosophy, an organization devoted to intercultural philosophical research and dialogue between European and Asian intellectual traditions. Schneider is known for several discoveries that have influenced modern Hegel scholarship. In 1971, he discovered the second edition (1832) of the first volume of Hegel's Science of Logic, providing scholars with an important textual witness for the study of Hegel's mature logic. In 1978 he rediscovered in Kraków the manuscript known as the "Oldest Systematic Program of German Idealism", a text traditionally associated with the intellectual circle of Hegel, Friedrich Wilhelm Joseph Schelling, and Friedrich Hölderlin. The manuscript had long been regarded as lost. Its rediscovery renewed scholarly discussion concerning the origins of German Idealism and the authorship of the document.

Schneider also participated in editorial work connected with the historical-critical edition of Hegel's writings and lecture manuscripts, including studies of newly recovered lecture notes on Hegel's philosophy of religion. Schneider has served as editor of the "Yearbook for Hegel Research", one of the principal international venues devoted to Hegel scholarship. Under his editorship the series has published critical editions of previously unpublished Hegel materials, interpretative essays, and bibliographical reports concerning Hegel studies worldwide. He has also co-edited numerous collective volumes on Hegel, German Idealism, social theory, and intercultural philosophy.

== Selected publications ==
- Philosophie und Sozialtheorie, Hrsg. von Tengiz Iremadze, Udo Jeck, Helmut Schneider. Band 1: Leben verstehen. Berlin 2014 (Logos Verlag Berlin).
- Zweiter Druck in: Hermeneutik aus chinesischer und westlicher Perspektive. Gedenkschrift zum 10. Todesjahr Hans-Georg Gadamers. Hrsg. von Pan Derong. Shanghai 2014, 190–196. (196: chines. Zusamenfassung) Chin. Titel: Zhongxi Xieshushiyexia de Quanshixue.
- Philosophische Urbanistik. Eine Theorie des humanen Raums. In: Philosophische Urbanistik, edited by Tengiz Iremadze and Helmut Schneider, Tbilisi, 2014.
- History of Freedom in Hegel's Philosophy: Ancient and Christian Conceptions of Freedom. In: The Idea of Freedom in Philosophy, Theology, and Social Sciences, edited by Tengiz Iremadze, Tbilisi, 2016, pp. 12–33 (In Georgian).
- The Development of Trinitarian Theology and Its Culmination in St. Augustine's Thought”. In: St. Augustine - Teacher of Christianity, edited by Tengiz Iremadze, Tbilisi, 2017, pp. 82–118 (In Georgian).
- G.W.F. Hegel: Vorlesung über die Philosophie der Religion. Herausgegeben von Helmut Schneider, mit Vorwort und Register. Bochum 2017. (Hegel Heute, Band 1)
- Die erste Vorlesung Hegels über Religionsphilosophie, in: Jahrbuch für Hegelforschung, hrsg. v. Helmut Schneider, Band 17–20, 2017.
- H. Schneider / K. Vieweg (Hrsg.): Das Denken des jungen Hegel im Kontext seiner Zeit. Bochum 2018 (Hegel Heute, Band 2).
- Japanische Übersetzung von: G. W. F. Hegel. Vorlesung über Ästhetik. Berlin 1820/21. Eine Nachschrift. Herausgegeben von Helmut Schneider. Frankfurt 1995 (Hegeliana, Bd. 3).
- Japanischer Titel: Bi gaku kogu. Übersetzt und herausgegeben von Joji Yorikawa. Tokyo 2017 (Hosei University Press).
- Wer war Dionysios Areopagita? In: Veritas et subtilitas. Truth and Subtility in the History of Philosophy. Essays in memory of Burkhard Mojsisch (1944–2019). Edited by Tengiz Iremadze und Udo Reinhold Jeck, Amsterdam/Philadelphia 2018. 117–126. (John Benjamins Publishing Company).
- The first translation of Daodejing into Latin in 1720 by Jesuit missionaries. In: 2nd World Conference of Chinese Studies. Conference Proceedings. Edited by Martin Woesler. 2018. 58–60. (Academic Press of the USA – European University Press).
- European and Asian Philosophy – their emergence in Europe, China and India. In: 3rd World Conference of Chinese Studies, Conference Booklet, ed. by M. Woesler, Bochum 2019, S. 49 (Conference Proceedings, in Vorbereitung).
- Helmut Schneider / Dirk Stederoth (Hrsg.): Dialektik und Dialog. Wolfdietrich Schmied-Kowarzik zum 80. Geburtstag. Kassel 2019 (Kasseler Philosophische Schriften. Neue Folge 9) Kassel University Press.
- Hegel's First Lecture of Philosophy of Religion in Berlin, Summer Semester of 1821”. In: Hegel's Philosophy of Religion, edited by Tengiz Iremadze, Tbilisi, 2019, pp. 11–50 (In Georgian).
- Helmut Schneider (Hrsg.): Eurasia. Schriften der Gesellschaft für Asiatische Philosophie I. Hamburg 2019, Verlag Dr. Kovacs.
- Jahrbuch für Hegelforschung. Verlag Academia im Nomos-Verlagsverbund, Baden-Baden, bisher 21 Bände (2020, Band 21).
