= Giacomo Rinaldi =

Professor of philosophy

Giacomo Rinaldi (born July 25, 1954, in Bergamo) is a professor of theoretical and moral philosophy at the University of Urbino and professor of philosophy at the New Georgian University.

He studied classical subjects in Lovere and earned a philosophy degree with honors from the University of Milan in 1978. His dissertation focused on Hegelian logic and critiques of phenomenology entitled Critica della gnoseologia fenomenologica, which In 1979, became his first book. He later received a fellowship at the Istituto Italiano per gli Studi Storici in Naples.

== Selected publications ==
- A History and Interpretation of the Logic of Hegel. Edwin Mellen Press. 1992. ISBN 978-0-88946-300-4.
- Rinaldi, Giacomo (2012). Absoluter Idealismus und zeitgenössische Philosophie - Absolute Idealism and Contemporary Philosophy. doi:10.3726/978-3-653-01375-7. ISBN 978-3-653-01375-7.
- The Philosophy of Art. Pertinent Press. 2021. ISBN 978-1-912142-33-0.
