= Burkhard Mojsisch =

German university professor (1944–2015)

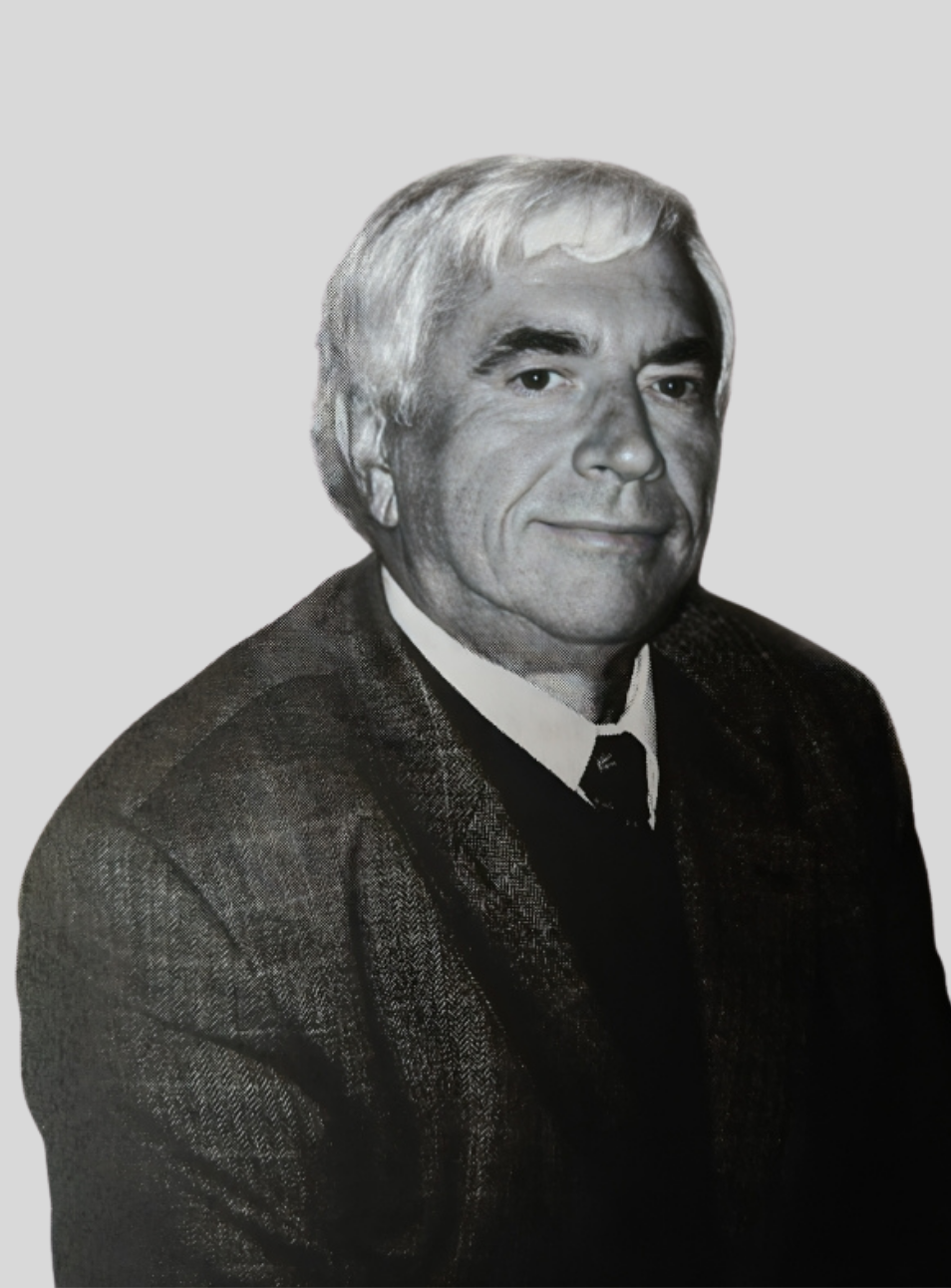
- Born: August 13, 1944; Guben
- Died: June 22, 2015 (aged 70); Bochum
- Citizenship: Germany
- Occupation: Philosophy

Academic background
- Education: Ruhr University Bochum
- Thesis: (1974)
- Influences: Kurt Flasch Hans Blumenberg

Academic work
- Discipline: Philosopher
- Sub-discipline: Medieval Philosophy
- Institutions: Ruhr University Bochum
- Notable students: Tengiz Iremadze

Burkhard Mojsisch (13 August 1944 – 22 June 2015) was a German philosopher, historian of philosophy, translator of medieval texts, and university professor. He was one of Germany's leading scholars of medieval philosophy, particularly known for his research on Meister Eckhart, Dietrich of Freiberg, Nicholas of Cusa, and the German philosophical tradition of the thirteenth and fourteenth centuries. He taught at the Faculty of Philosophy of the Ruhr University Bochum, where he succeeded Kurt Flasch as Professor of Philosophy with special emphasis on Ancient and Medieval Philosophy. He was also an editor of the Corpus Philosophorum Teutonicorum Medii Aevi (CPTMA), an editorial project devoted to medieval German philosophy.

== Early life and education ==
Mojsisch was born on 13 August 1944 in Guben, Germany. He studied philosophy under Hans Blumenberg and Kurt Flasch and completed his doctoral dissertation at Ruhr University Bochum in 1974. His dissertation, Die Theorie des Intellekts bei Dietrich von Freiberg ("The Theory of Intellect in Dietrich of Freiberg"), examined the epistemology and theory of intellect of the Dominican philosopher Dietrich of Freiberg and became an important contribution to the revival of scholarly interest in Dietrich's thought. In 1982, he completed his habilitation at Bochum with a study devoted to Meister Eckhart, further establishing himself as a specialist in medieval intellectual history.

== Academic career ==
After receiving his habilitation, Mojsisch was appointed außerplanmäßiger Professor (adjunct professor) at Ruhr University Bochum in 1987 and became a full professor in 1992. He later succeeded Kurt Flasch as Chair of Ancient and Medieval Philosophy at Bochum. He remained one of the university's leading scholars of medieval philosophy until his retirement in the summer of 2009.

Beyond his teaching and research activities, Mojsisch played a major role in international medieval studies through editorial work and scholarly collaboration. He served as:

- Director and co-editor of the Corpus Philosophorum Teutonicorum Medii Aevi;
- Co-editor of the Bochumer Philosophisches Jahrbuch für Antike und Mittelalter;
- Co-editor of the Bochumer Studien zur Philosophie;
- Foreign Member of the Georgian Academy of Sciences.

== Work ==
Mojsisch's scholarship focused on both ancient and medieval philosophy. His work on ancient philosophy concentrated primarily on the thought of Plato and Aristotle. His research on medieval philosophy focused especially on Meister Eckhart, Anselm of Canterbury, Dietrich of Freiberg, Nicholas of Cusa.

Mojsisch belonged to a generation of German historians of philosophy who challenged older interpretations of medieval thought by emphasizing its philosophical autonomy rather than treating it merely as theology. His studies of Dietrich of Freiberg and Meister Eckhart highlighted the importance of theories of intellect, self-consciousness, metaphysics, and Neoplatonic influences within medieval German philosophy. Particularly influential was his interpretation of Dietrich of Freiberg's doctrine of intellect and consciousness (ens conceptionale), which contributed to renewed international interest in Dietrich as an original philosopher rather than merely a precursor of Eckhart.

Corpus Philosophorum Teutonicorum Medii Aevi

One of Mojsisch's most significant scholarly achievements was his long association with the Corpus Philosophorum Teutonicorum Medii Aevi (CPTMA). The project was founded by Kurt Flasch and Loris Sturlese to publish critical editions of largely unpublished texts of medieval German philosophers. Mojsisch served as editor and co-editor of the series for many years.

The CPTMA has been regarded as a foundational scholarly enterprise for the study of medieval German philosophy and mysticism. Its editions have made accessible texts by figures such as: Dietrich of Freiberg, Ulrich of Strasbourg, Berthold of Moosburg, Nicholas of Strasbourg, Heinrich of Lübeck.

Work on Meister Eckhart

Mojsisch was internationally recognized scholar of Meister Eckhart. His studies emphasized Eckhart's philosophical use of Neoplatonism and Aristotelianism and explored questions of analogy, univocity, intellect, and divine unity. His book Meister Eckhart: Analogie, Univozität und Einheit became a notable contribution to Eckhart scholarship. His research sought to place Eckhart within the broader intellectual tradition of German Dominican philosophy that included Dietrich of Freiberg and Albert the Great rather than interpreting him solely as a mystic.

== Legacy ==
Burkhard Mojsisch died on 22 June 2015 at the age of 70. His research on medieval philosophy, particularly on Meister Eckhart and Dietrich of Freiberg, as well as his editorial work for the Corpus Philosophorum Teutonicorum Medii Aevi, contributed to the study of medieval German intellectual history. His scholarly influence is reflected in the publication of the festschrift Philosophy in Global Change on the occasion of his sixty-fifth birthday (2011) and the memorial volume Veritas et subtilitas: Truth and Subtlety in the History of Philosophy (2018), edited by his colleagues Tengiz Iremadze and Udo Reinhold Jeck and dedicated to his memory. Both volumes address themes closely related to his research interests.

== Selected works ==
- Die Theorie des Intellekts bei Dietrich von Freiberg, (Beihefte zu Dietrich von Freiberg, Opera omnia, Beih. 1) Hamburg 1977.
- Meister Eckhart. Analogie, Univozität und Einheit, Hamburg 1983.
- Meister Eckhart. Analogy, Univocity and Unity, transl. with a Preface and an Appendix by O. F. Summerell, Amsterdam / Philadelphia 2001.
- Sprachphilosophie in Antike und Mittelalter. Bochumer Kolloquium, 2.-4. Juni 1982, hrsg. von B. Mojsisch, (Bochumer Studien zur Philosophie, Bd. 3) Amsterdam 1986.
- Historia Philosophiae Medii Aevi. Studien zur Geschichte der Philosophie des Mittelalters, Festschrift für K. Flasch zu seinem 60. Geburtstag, hrsg. von B. Mojsisch, O. Pluta, 2 Bde., Amsterdam / Philadelphia 1991.
- Platon. Seine Dialoge in der Sicht neuer Forschungen, hrsg. von Th. Kobusch, B. Mojsisch, Darmstadt 1996 (Sonderausgabe: 2005).
- Platon in der abendländischen Geistesgeschichte. Neue Forschungen zum Platonismus, hrsg. von Th. Kobusch, B. Mojsisch, Darmstadt 1997 (Sonderausgabe: 2006).
- Die Grenzen der Sprache. Sprachimmanenz - Sprachtranszendenz, hrsg. von Chr. Asmuth, Fr. Glauner, B. Mojsisch, Amsterdam / Philadelphia 1998.
- Dietrich von Freiberg. Neue Perspektiven seiner Philosophie, Theologie und Naturwissenschaft, hrsg. von K.-H. Kandler, B. Mojsisch, Fr.-B. Stammkötter, (Bochumer Studien zur Philosophie, Bd. 28) Amsterdam / Philadelphia 1999.
- Umbrüche. Historische Wendepunkte der Philosophie von der Antike bis zur Neuzeit, Festschrift für K. Flasch zu seinem 70. Geburtstag, hrsg. von K. Kahnert, B. Mojsisch, Amsterdam / Philadelphia 2001.
- Die Philosophie in ihren Disziplinen. Eine Einführung. Bochumer Ringvorlesung Wintersemester 1999/2000, hrsg. von B. Mojsisch, O. F. Summerell, (Bochumer Studien zur Philosophie, Bd. 35) Amsterdam / Philadelphia 2002.
- Selbst - Singularität - Subjektivität. Vom Neuplatonismus zum Deutschen Idealismus, hrsg. von Th. Kobusch, B. Mojsisch, O. F. Summerell, Amsterdam / Philadelphia 2002.
- Platonismus im Idealismus. Die platonische Tradition in der klassischen deutschen Philosophie, hrsg. von B. Mojsisch, O. F. Summerell, München / Leipzig 2003.
- Potentiale des menschlichen Geistes: Freiheit und Kreativität. Praktische Aspekte der Philosophie Marsilio Ficinos (1433–1499), hrsg. von M. Bloch, B. Mojsisch, Stuttgart 2003.
- Die Aktualität der Philosophie Kants. Bochumer Ringvorlesung Sommersemester 2004, hrsg. von K. Schmidt, Kl. Steigleder, B. Mojsisch, (Bochumer Studien zur Philosophie, Bd. 42) Amsterdam / Philadelphia 2005.
- Die Idee der Freiheit in Philosophie und Sozialtheorie, unter Mitwirkung von H. Grabst hrsg. von M. Beriashvili, B. Mojsisch, Saarbrücken 2010.
- Die Klassiker der Freiheitsphilosophie. Von Platon bis Heidegger (georgisch), hrsg. von M. Beriashvili, U. R. Jeck, B. Mojsisch, Tbilisi 2011. Die Gedankenwelt Dietrichs von Freiberg im Kontext seiner Zeitgenossen, hrsg. von K.-H. Kandler, B. Mojsisch, N. Pohl, (Freiberger Forschungshefte D 243) Freiberg 2013.
- Philosophenlexikon, hrsg. von St. Jordan, B. Mojsisch, Stuttgart 2009, 2013.
