= Grigoli Berbichashvili =

Georgian Orthodox Church

His Eminence Grigoli
- Metropolitan of Poti and Khobi
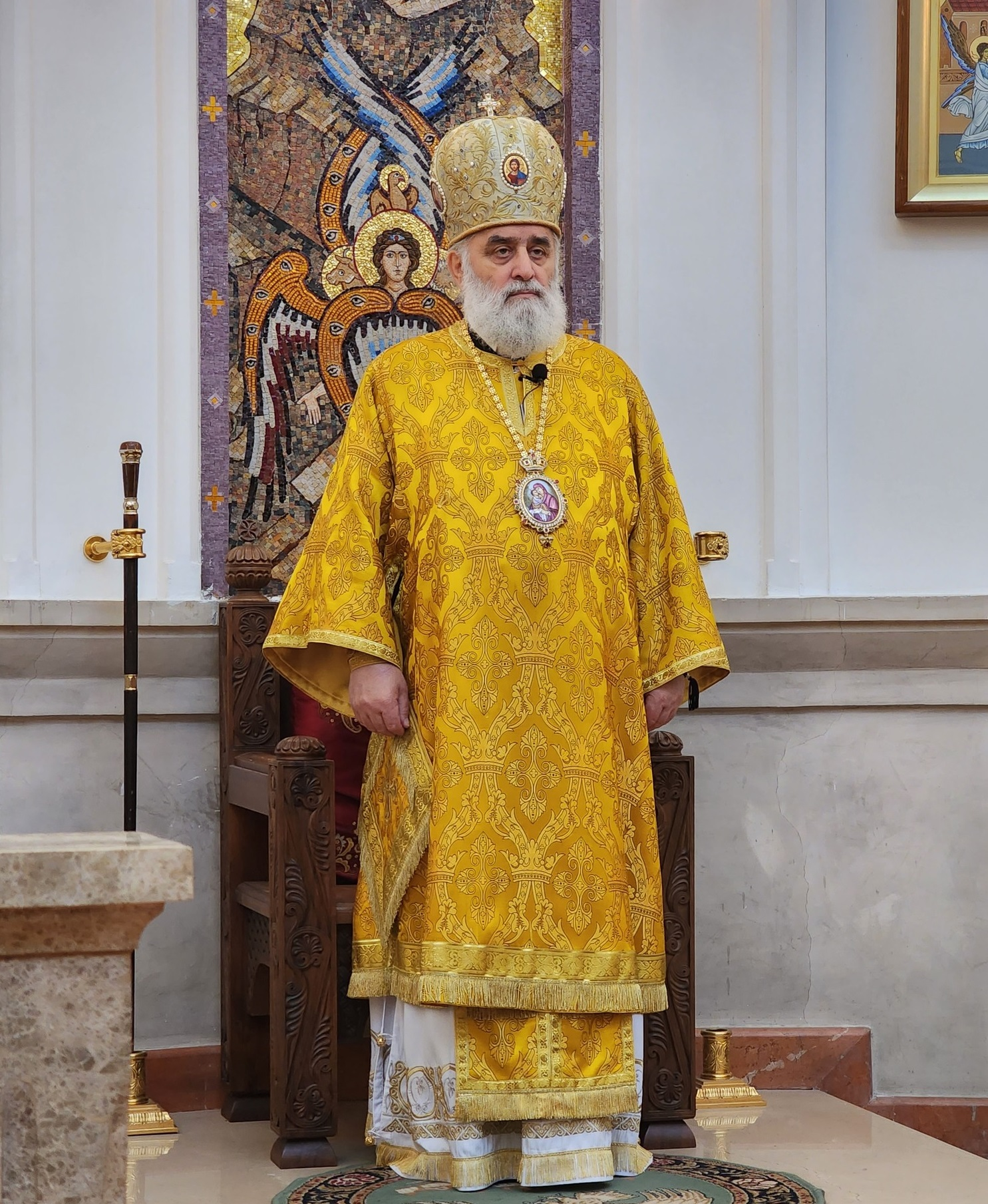
- Native name: გრიგოლი
- Church: Georgian Orthodox Church
- Diocese: Poti and Khobi
- See: Poti
- Other posts: Rector of New Georgian University, Head of the Department of the Georgian Patriarchate for Publishing and Reviewing

Orders
- Ordination: October 14, 1989
- Consecration: March 24, 1996

Personal details
- Education: Doctor of Philosophy
- Alma mater: Tbilisi Theological Seminary Grigol Robakidze University

Metropolitan Grigoli Berbichashvili (Georgian: მიტროპოლიტი გრიგოლი ბერბიჭაშვილი; born July 18, 1956) is the Georgian Orthodox Metropolitan of Poti and Khobi, a member of holy synod of Apostolic Autocephalous Orthodox Church of Georgia, Head of the Department of the Georgian Patriarchate for Publishing and Reviewing and Rector of New Georgian University.

== Early life and education ==
Metropolitan Grigoli was born Guram Berbichashvili (Georgian: გურამ ბერბიჭაშვილი) on July 18, 1956, in Tbilisi, Georgian SSR. After graduating secondary school (1973) he matriculated into the civil aviation college in Krivoi Rog, Ukraine (1974). Since early 1980s he was a parishioner of St. Barbara's Church in Tbilisi. In 1988-1990 he studied at Tbilisi Theological Seminary and in 1990-1994 studied theology at Tbilisi Theological Academy. In 2014-2017 he studied on a doctoral program of philosophy at Grigol Robakidze University, Tbilisi. In May 2017 he defended his PhD thesis: "Iona Khelashvili's Metaphysical Conception" and received Doctor of Philosophy degree.

== Ecclesiastical life ==
October 14, 1989, he was ordained a deacon at Svetitskhoveli Cathedral by Metropolitan Konstantin Melikidze of Batumi and Shemokmedi. A year later he was ordained a priest at the Batumi Cathedral. The same year he became dean of Likhauri Church (Ozurgeti municipality) and of Achi St. George Church. February 2, 1994, he was ordained archpriest and awarded with golden cross by Catholicos Patriarch of all Georgia.

On March 21, 1996, Grigoli Berbichashvili was ordained a monk. On March 23, of the same year, he was ordained an Archimandrite and awarded with beautified cross and mitre. On March 24, 1996, he was consecrated Bishop of Poti by Catholicos Patriarch of all Georgia at Svetitskhoveli Cathedral. In 2003 he was raised to an Archbishop of Poti and Khobi and in 2007 was raised to the rank of Metropolitan.

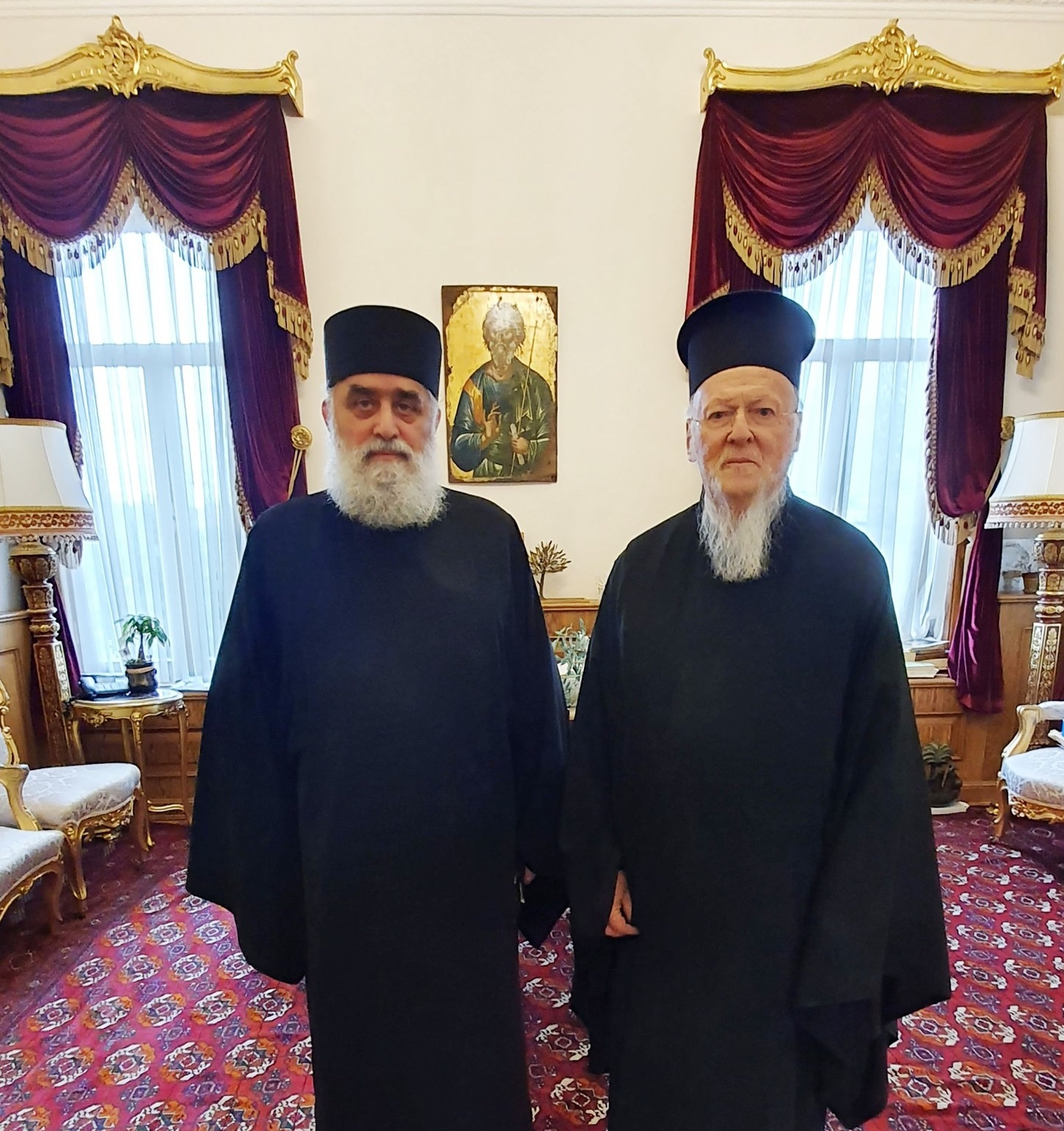
Bartholomew I of Constantinople and Metropolitan Grigoli in Fener, 2022

As a member of holy synod Metropolitan Grgioli served on several positions. In 1996-2003 he was a head of the department of the Georgian Patriarchate for the Armed forces and Law Enforcement Institutions. 2005-2008 he was chairman of the committee of the Georgian Patriarchate for the relationship with state on the issues of education. Since 2003 he is a head of the department of the Georgian Patriarchate for Publishing and Reviewing.

Since his consecration Metropolitan Grigoli headed building and restoration of over thirty churches and monasteries in his Diocese including important spiritual centers such as Poti Cathedral and Nojikhevi Monastery.

== Educational work ==
In 1991-1995 he was supervising courses in canonical law for teachers in Ozurgeti and was publishing Orthodox Christian journal Tskaro. In 1995-1996 was rector at Ozurgeti St. Nino Gymnasium.

Since 2010 Metropolitan Grigoli is Editor-in-chief of Uplis tsikhe (Lord`s Castle), a Journal of the Georgian Patriarchate. In 2003 he founded St. Nicholas` Secondary School in Poti, in 2009 he founded Phazisi Philosophical-Theological Academy in Poti, in 2015 he founded New Georgian University – a higher educational research and teaching institution specializing in Christian Philosophy and Christian Psychology.

== Honors and awards ==
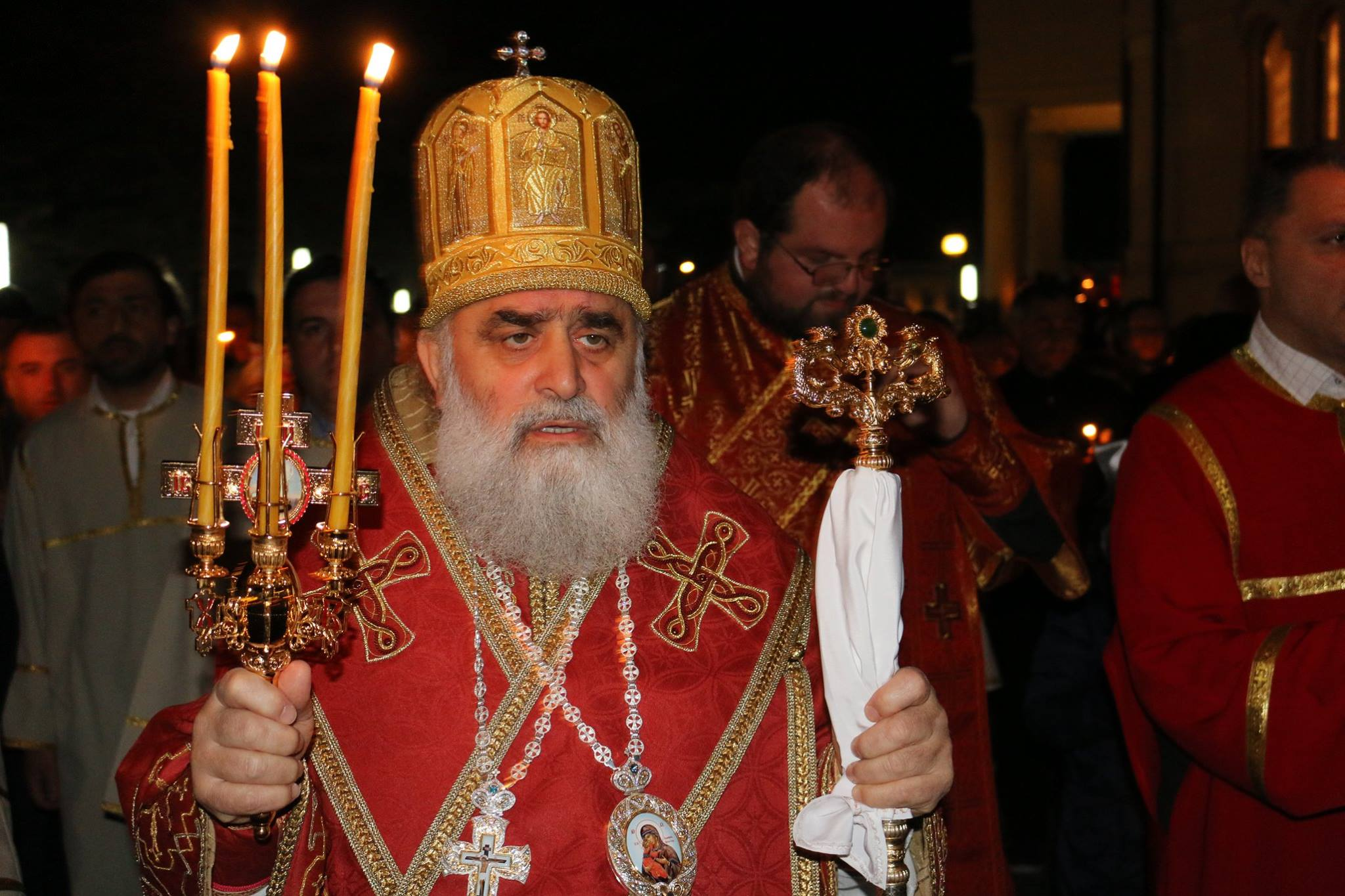
Metropolitan Grigoli on divine liturgy in Poti, 2018

- St. George's Golden Order (by decree of Catholicos Patriarch of all Georgia) - December 25, 2007.
- Vakhtang Gorgasali Order of First Class (by decree No. 611 of President of Georgia) -September 16, 2008.
- Honorary Citizen of Khobi (by the decree of the city council of Khobi) - July 17, 2011.
- Presidential Order of Excellence (by decree No. 13/09/01 of President of Georgia) - September 13, 2012.
- Order of St. Nicholas (by decree No. 04/11/04 of President of Georgia) - November 4, 2013.
- Honorary Citizen of Poti (by the decree of the city council of Poti) - August 10, 2016.
- Doctor Honoris Causa of St. Vladimir's Orthodox Theological Seminary (by the decision of the board of trustees of SVOTS) - May 14, 2022.
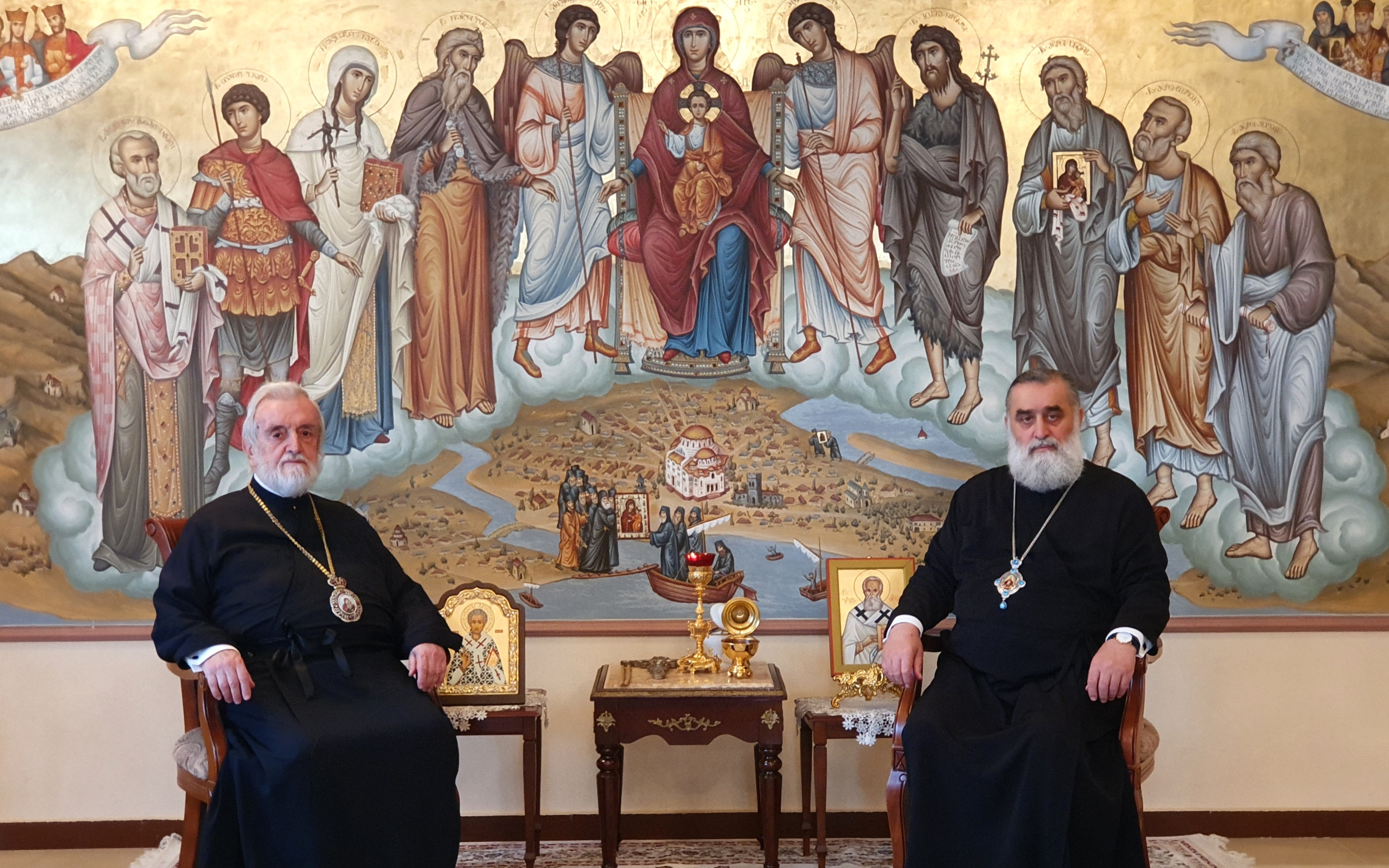
  Metropolitan Grigoli and Metropolitan John Zizioulas in Poti, 2019

== Selected works ==
=== Books ===
- Iona Khelashvili`s Metaphysical Conception, Tbilisi, 2017.
- On Some Urgent Problems of Philosophy of Human Rights, Tbilisi, 2013.
- The Law is Good if One Uses it Properly, 1 Timothy 1:8, Ozurgeti, 1995.
- A Short Catechism of Orthodox Christian Church for Catechumens, Ozurgeti, 1992.

=== Articles ===
- “Iona Khelashvili`s Metaphysics” in: Veritas et subtilitas. Truth and subtlety in the History of Philosophy. Essays in memory of Burkhard Mojsisch (1944-2015), Amsterdam/Philadelphia: John Benjamins Publishing Company, 2017, pp. 431–439.
- “Metaphysics of Freedom according to Iona Khelashvili”, in: The Idea of Freedom in Philosophy, Theology, and Social Sciences, Tbilisi, 2016, pp. 76–90.
- “About Some Unknown Aspects of Iona Khelashvili’s (1778-1837) Life and Work”, in: European Scientific Journal, special edition, vol. 2 (November, 2014), pp. 146–152.
- “Reconsidering the Biography of Iona Khelashvili”, in: Early Modern Georgian Philosophy and Its Major Representatives, Tbilisi, 2014, pp. 101–116.
- “Christianity and Human Rights”, Uplis tsikhe, Georgian Patriarchate, No. 3, Tbilisi, 2014, pp. 18–26.
- “Human Rights in the Contemporary Context and Their Actuality”, Guli gonieri, No. 7, Tbilisi, 2014, pp. 7–22.
