= Gia Gachechiladze =

Georgian pop singer, actor, media personality, and activist

Giorgi "Gia" Gachechiladze (Georgian: გიორგი (გია) გაჩეჩილაძე), also known by his stage name Utsnobi (უცნობი, "stranger") (born 13 February, 1966) is a Georgian pop singer, actor, media personality, and activist. He is a brother of the businessman and former politician Levan Gachechiladze.

== Biography ==
Born in Tbilisi, then-Soviet Georgia, Gachechiladze graduated from the Tbilisi Institute of Theatre in 1987. He was part of the Rustaveli Theatre troupe from 1987 to 1993. He also appeared in several films. In the 1990s Gachechiladze achieved popularity on the Georgian pop scene where he went by the stage name Utsnobi ("stranger"). In 2004 he founded and ran the radio Utsnobi, which later became part of the homonymous media holding.

=== Involvement in politics ===
Gachechiladze first became involved in politics in 2003 when he lent his support to the opposition movement against the government of Eduard Shevardnadze. The subsequent protests eventually propelled Mikheil Saakashvili to the leadership of Georgia, of whom Gachechiladze soon ran afoul. He was one of the key persons in the anti-Saakashvili protests in 2009, when the opposition constructed a "cell town" to block Rustaveli Avenue, the main thoroughfare in Georgia's capital Tbilisi. This was claimed to have been a statement about the alleged lack of justice and freedom, inspired by Gachechiladze's Cell No. 5, a reality show in which he had been living and holding meetings in a symbolic cell at the opposition Maestro TV building.

After Saakashvili lost power to the Georgian Dream coalition led by the tycoon Bidzina Ivanishvili in 2012, Gachechiladze cultivated close ties with the new ruling party and enjoyed frequent airtime on pro-government television stations while also running his own TV show utsnobis kidobani ("Utsnobi's Ark"). Gachechiladze has used these platforms to denounce the Georgian Dream government's domestic and foreign critics amid allegations of Georgia's democratic backslide and to articulate conservative and anti-Western views, such as alleging Western infringement on Georgia's sovereignty and parroting a "second front" conspiracy theory, a claim that the West was trying to get Georgia involved in a conflict with Russia during its invasion of Ukraine.

In 2021 Gachechiladze also launched a new movement which he claimed was opposed to all political actors who were drowning the country into a political crisis, both the authorities and opposition. However, his subsequent rallies were attended by many government officials and Georgian Dream party supporters.
