= Kurt Flasch =

German philosopher (born 1930)

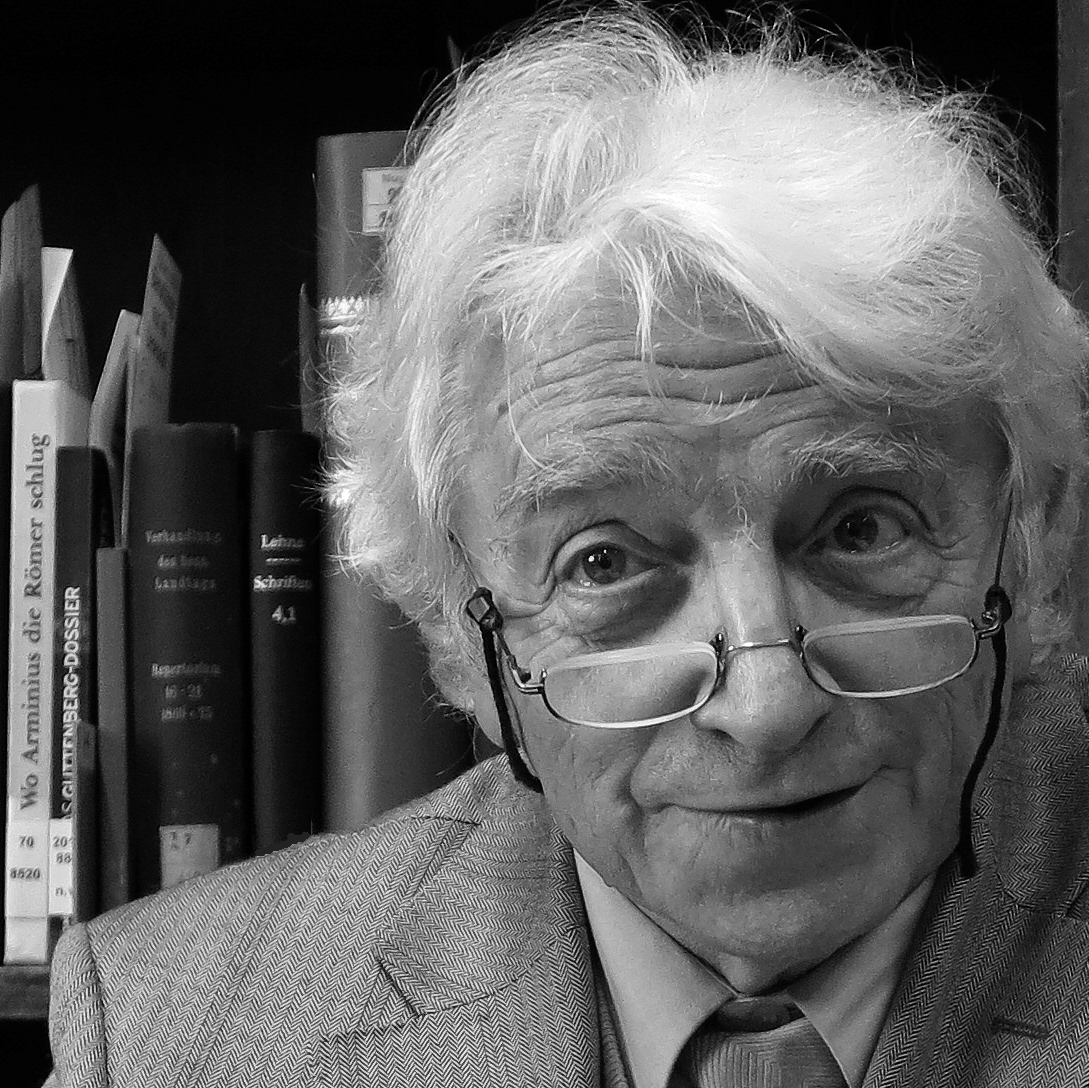
- Flasch in 2012
- Born: March 12, 1930 (age 96); Mainz, Germany

Kurt Flasch (born 12 March 1930, Mainz) is a German philosopher, who works mainly as a historian of medieval thought and of late antiquity. Flasch was professor at the Ruhr University Bochum. He was / is a member of several German and international Academies. In 2000, he was awarded the Sigmund Freud Prize by the Deutsche Akademie für Sprache und Dichtung.

== Awards and recognitions ==
- Sigmund Freud Prize 2000
- Honorary Doctorate from University of Lucerne 2002
- Hannah Arendt Prize 2009
- Honorary Doctorate from University of Basel 2010
- Joseph Breitbach Prize 2012

== Works in English ==
- Meister Eckhart: Philosopher of Christianity. Yale University Press, November 24, 2015

== Bibliography ==
- Ordo dicitur multipliciter: Eine Studie zur Philosophie des "ordo" bei Thomas von Aquin, Frankfurt: Frankfurt University, 1956
- Die Metaphysik des Einen bei Nikolaus von Kues: Problemgeschichtliche Stellung und Systematische Bedeutung, Leiden: Brill, 1973
- Das philosophische Denken im Mittelalter, Stuttgart: Reclam, 1986
- Einführung in die Philosophie des Mittelalters, Darmstadt: Wissenschaftliche Buchgesellschaft, 1987
- Augustin: Einführung in sein Denken, Stuttgart: Reclam, 1988
- Aufklärung im Mittelalter: Die Verurteilung von 1277, Mainz: Dieterich’sche Verlagsbuchhandlung, 1989
- Logik des Schreckens: Augustinus von Hippo, Die Gnadenlehre von 397, Mainz: Dieterich’sche Verlagsbuchhandlung, 1990
- Poesie nach der Pest: Der Anfang des Decameron, Mainz: Dieterich’sche Verlagsbuchhandlung, 1992
- Nikolaus von Kues: Geschichte einer Entwicklung, Vorlesungen zur Einführung in seine Philosophie, Frankfurt: Vittorio Klostermann, 1998
- Die geistige Mobilmachung: Die deutschen Intellektuellen und der Erste Weltkrieg, Ein Versuch, Berlin: Alexander Fest, 2000
- Über die Brücke: Mainzer Kindheit 1930–1949, Mainz: H. Schmidt Universitätsdruckerei, 2002
- Vernunft und Vergnügen: Liebesgeschichten aus dem Decameron, Munich: C.H. Beck, 2002
- Philosophie hat Geschichte, Frankfurt: Vittorio Klostermann, 2003
- Was ist Zeit? Augustinus von Hippo: Das XI. Buch der Confessiones, Historisch-philosophische Studie, Text – Übersetzung – Kommentar (2016 3rd ed.), Frankfurt: Vittorio Klostermann, 1993
- Eva und Adam: Wandlungen eines Mythos, Munich: C.H. Beck, 2005
- Meister Eckhart: Die Geburt der "Deutschen Mystik" aus dem Geist der arabischen Philosophie, Munich: C.H. Beck, 2006
- Dietrich von Freiberg. Philosophie, Theologie, Naturforschung um 1300, Frankfurt: Vittorio Klostermann, 2007
- Kampfplätze der Philosophie: Große Kontroversen von Augustinus bis Voltaire, Frankfurt: Vittorio Klostermann, 2008
- Meister Eckhart: Philosoph des Christentums, Munich: C.H. Beck, 2010
- Commedia und Einladung, Dante zu lesen, Frankfurt: S. Fischer, 2011
- Was ist Gott? Das Buch der 24 Philosophen, Munich: C.H. Beck, 2011
- Warum ich kein Christ bin: Bericht und Argumentation, Munich: C.H. Beck, 2013
- Der Teufel und seine Engel: Geschichte einer Verführung, Munich: C.H. Beck, 2015
- Hans Blumenberg, Philosoph in Deutschland – Die Jahre 1945–1966, Frankfurt a. M.: Klostermann 2017, ISBN 978-3-465-00017-4.
- Katholische Wegbereiter des Nationalsozialismus. Michael Schmaus, Joseph Lortz, Josef Pieper. Essay. Frankfurt, Vittorio Klostermann, 2021, ISBN 978-3-465-02706-5.
