= Grigol Robakidze University =

University in Tbilisi, Georgia

- გრიგოლ რობაქიძის უნივერსიტეტი
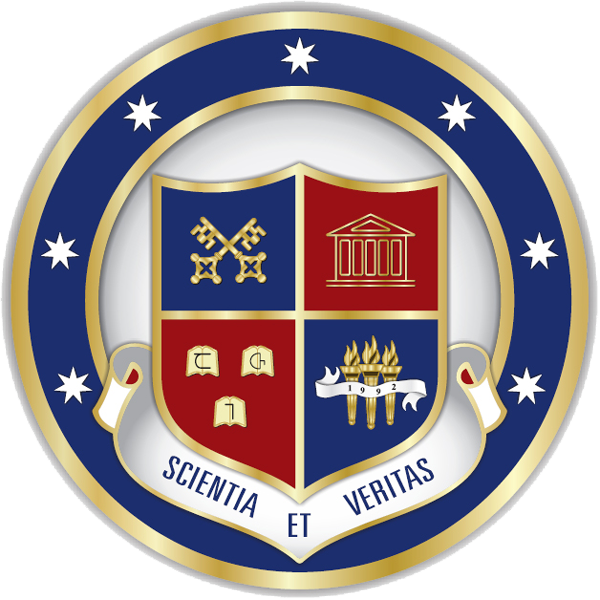
- Other name: GRUNI
- Motto: "Scientia et Veritas"
- Type: Private
- Established: 1992; 34 years ago
- Chancellor: Giorgi Tavkhelidze
- Rector: Mamuka Tavkhelidze
- Total staff: 90
- Students: 2800
- Location: Tbilisi, Georgia; 41°47′37″N 44°46′21″E
- Campus: Urban
- Colours: Red, blue
- Website: www.gruni.edu.ge

Grigol Robakidze University (Georgian: გრიგოლ რობაქიძის სახელობის უნივერსიტეტი [grigol robakidzis saxelobis universiteti]) is established in 1992 in Tbilisi, Georgia. It specialises in medicine and dentistry, but also has courses in the social sciences, English and German.

The university was renamed in honor of the Georgian poet and thinker, Grigol Robakidze.

== Location ==
The university's faculties are on Irina Enukidze #3 (David Aghmashebeli #13), in the downtown of Tbilisi, Georgia and includes a new building located near US Embassy in the suburb of Tbilisi.

== Schools ==
As of December 2012:

- School of Humanities and Social Sciences
- School of Law
- School of Business and Management
- School of Medicine
- School of Public Administration and Politics

Institutions and research centers:

- Institute of Philosophy and Social Sciences
- Scientific-Research institute of public administration
- Scientific Research Institute of Law and Criminology
- Jim Corbett International Research Center
- Scientific Research Institute of Human Rights
- Land Law Student Research Center
- Business and Management Scientific Research Center
- Scientific Research Center of Medicine
- Scientific Research Institute of History and Geography of Georgian Emigration
- Scientific Research Institute of Juvenology
- GRUNI SDG Center
- Migration and Diaspora Research Center
- International Student Support Center

== Library ==
The library has about 20,000 books and digital material are kept in the library. Service is systematically developed in the library. The electronic library was established in 2010. This enables consumers to choose books and periodicals
