= Ioane Petritsi =

Georgian philosopher

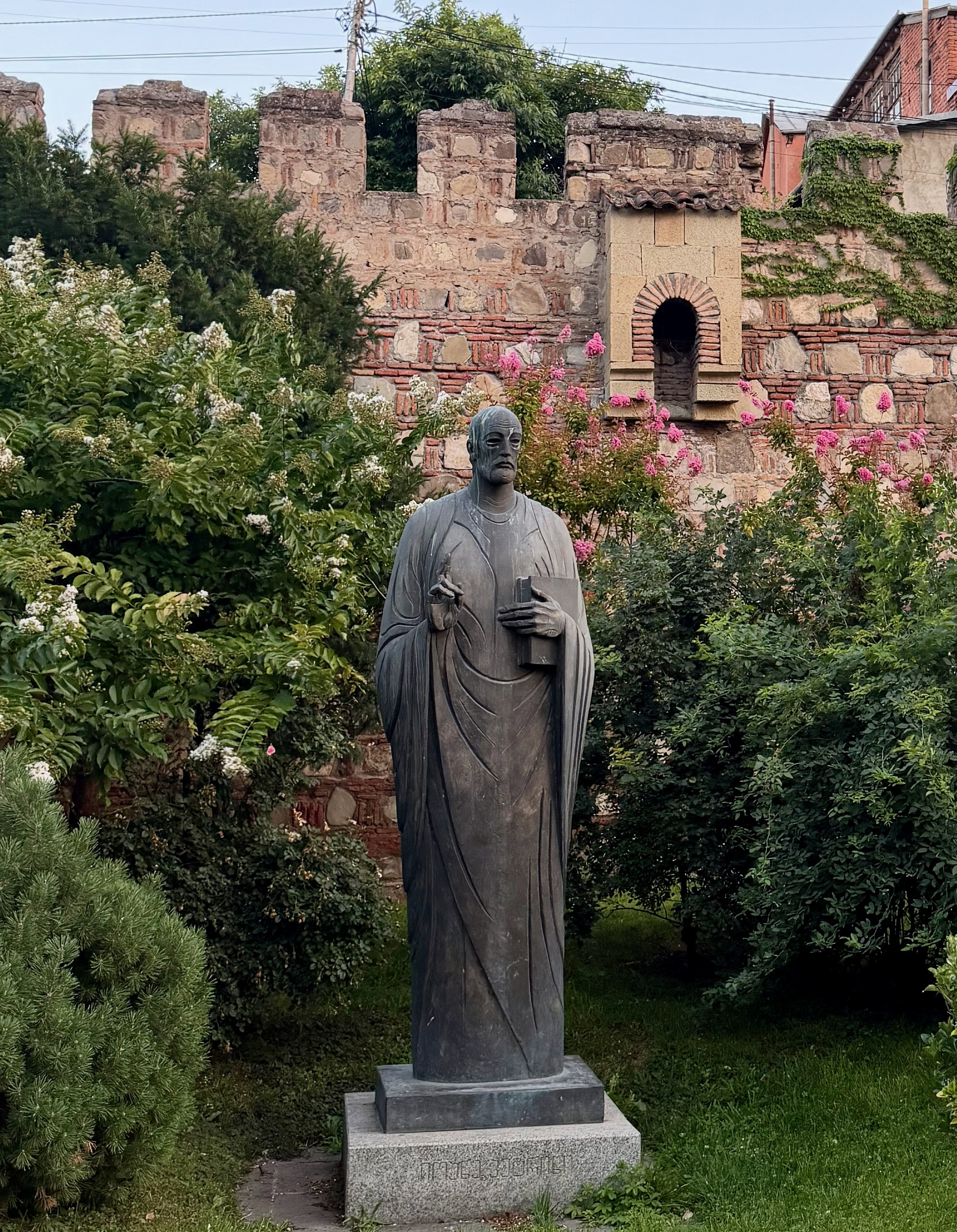
- Monument of Ioane Petritsi in Tbilisi
- Born: 11th century Chimchimi, Samtskhe, Kingdom of Georgia
- Died: 12th century

Education
- Academic advisor: Michael Psellos

Philosophical work
- Era: Medieval philosophy
- Region: Western philosophy
- School: Neoplatonism
- Main interests: Philosophy, literature, poetry, hymns, Christian theology, translation, mysticism, asceticism, astrology
- Notable ideas: Christian reception of Proclus

Ioane Petritsi (Georgian: იოანე პეტრიწი, romanized: ioane p'et'rits'i), also referred as John Petritzos, was a Georgian Neoplatonic philosopher of the 11th–12th century. Active in the Byzantine Empire and the Kingdom of Georgia, he is best known for his translations of Proclus, along with an extensive commentary.

The Stanford Encyclopedia of Philosophy describes Petritsi as "the most significant Georgian medieval philosopher" and the "most widely read Georgian philosopher."

In later sources, he is also referred to as Ioane Chimchimeli (Georgian: იოანე ჭიმჭიმელი, romanized: ioane ch'imch'imeli).

== Life ==
Petritsi is reported to have been born into an aristocratic family from the southern Georgian province of Samtskhe, and educated at Constantinople under the tutelage of Michael Psellos and John Italus. After the fall of Italus, Ioane seems to have fled to the Georgian monastery of Petritsoni in Bulgaria, whence comes his epithet Petritsi. He translated many philosophical works, principally Neoplatonic, with the aim of reconciling the Classical ideas with the principal message of Christianity. His broad philosophic outlook brought him into collision with the Georgian patristic orthodoxy, until the king David IV of Georgia eventually established him at Gelati Academy. He translated Aristotle, Proclus, Nemesius, Ammonius Hermiae, components of the Bible, hagiography, and some other pieces. Of his few original works, an extensive commentary to Proclus and Neoplatonism is the most important. But he also composed ascetic and mystic poetry, and hymns.

Both in his philosophy and his literary style, Petritsi had a long lasting influence on Georgian philosophic thought and literature, which became more prominent in the 18th century under the reformist scholar Catholicos Anton I.
