= Intercultural philosophy =

Global or intercultural philosophy is an approach to philosophy which emphasizes the integration of influences from different cultures. It can represent the meeting of different philosophical traditions, such as Western philosophy, Asian philosophy, and African philosophy.

Writing for the IEP, Ronnie Littlejohn distinguished comparative philosophy, "in which philosophers work on problems by intentionally setting into dialogue various sources from across cultural, linguistic, and philosophical streams", and world philosophy, "in which philosophers construct a philosophical system based on the fullness of global traditions of thought". Thom Brooks refers to global philosophy as an "unbounded approach to philosophy ... motivated by focus on improved ability to address philosophical problem-solving".

While many precursors could be identified, such as Paul Masson-Oursel, Brajendranath Seal, and Sarvepalli Radhakrishnan, intercultural philosophy as a concept emerged in the 1980s. It is frequently connected to German-speaking European thinkers pursuing an intercultural philosophical perspective.

== The idea of intercultural philosophy ==
In the long history of philosophical thought there has always been a claim for universality, although many great thinkers from the past see philosophical value only in the western tradition and overlook what other parts of the world have achieved on their own over the centuries. Eurocentric philosophers such as Georg Wilhelm Friedrich Hegel agree upon Greek being the only birthplace of philosophy and traditions such as the Chinese or Indian ones are only teachings of wisdom. Others speak of more than one birthplace and include Asian traditions.

Karl Jaspers, a German psychiatrist and philosopher, developed the theory of an Axial Age, referring to the period from 800 BCE to 200 BCE, during which philosophical thinking evolved in China, Indian and the Occident. Jasper's theory is widely accepted by those philosophising interculturally.

In contrast to any eurocentrism there are those philosophers who believe that there needs to be communication as well as collaboration between different traditions and cultures especially in today's global situation, given that intercultural interactions and encounters are a fact of human existence. The goal is to extend one's thinking into including other cultures, to not only consider one tradition but as many as possible such as Asian, Anglo-American, Latin-American, Islamic, or African. It is no longer important to ask questions on your own for this would be a very regional approach. Intercultural philosophy shouldn't be an academic subject besides others but an attitude followed by everybody who philosophises. No matter what philosophical orientation, other culture's thoughts should be taken into consideration.

For Raimon Panikkar it is also important to connect religion and philosophy, as they are both key elements of human reality and important to many cultures. When developing an approach to intercultural philosophy one has to abandon the idea of using only one's own ways of demonstration and description but has to include other forms such as dance, music, architecture, rituals, art, literature, myths, proverbs, folk tales and so on. A manner of meeting has to be found to allow a variety of exchange where one's own tradition can be preserved and not be forged into one big syncretism. The only way to stop cultures from being absorbed by globalisation and becoming something of a world culture, which is monoculturally predetermined, according to Fornet-Betancort, is the project of an intercultural dialogue. Others view China and Japan as an example of intercultural practise that others could learn from as they have managed to integrate Buddhism without losing their own cultural identity. Philosophers such as Wimmer and Mall postulate forms of dialogue in which all parties are on the same level ('Ebene der Gleichheit') without having any other power but the better argument.

== Main thinkers ==
It is not possible to name any forefathers or -mothers of intercultural thought simply because there have always been individuals in the history of philosophy who have taken an intercultural approach in their theories. Although nothing defined and without much impact. Since intercultural philosophy has become a concern to more than just a couple of philosophers there are quite a few names to be mentioned. Their concepts of intercultural philosophy differ according to their personal backgrounds but what they all agree upon is the practical relevance this approach presents. They each have their own suggestions for how intercultural philosophy should respond to today's situation of globalisation.

=== Raúl Fornet-Betancourt ===
Fornet-Betancourt (born 1946) is a professor in the department for missiology in Aachen, Germany. He was born and raised in Cuba, where he already came in contact with more than one culture, namely with the European or Hispanic and the African culture. His main interest lies with the Latin-American philosophy, though he has declared he doesn't research the Latin-American philosophy on his own but with help from philosophers native to this tradition. Fornet-Betancourt sees the importance of an intercultural approach in the overcoming of any eurocentrism still dominating the world. The history of philosophy shouldn't be reconstructed on the basis of the expansionary development but by means of the diversity of all cultures of humankind. But not only the past should be taken into consideration, the redesign of the present is of equal importance. Intercultural philosophy is a means for making variety heard.

=== Heinz Kimmerle ===
Kimmerle (born 1930) is professor emeritus at the Erasmus University Rotterdam. He intends to develop a way from colonial thinking towards a dialogue with the African philosophy based on complete equality in order to conceive of an intercultural concept of philosophy. For Kimmerle, interculturality influences everything and therefore philosophy has to adapt itself to interculturality in all sub areas as to not lose its practical relevance. In his opinion philosophy of art plays an important role, for it pioneers intercultural thinking.

=== Ram Adhar Mall ===
Mall (born 1937) is a professor of philosophy and teaches intercultural philosophy and hermeneutics at LMU Munich. He has systematically worked through Indian philosophy and sociology, and views himself as an "insider" as well as an "outsider", due to his Indian heritage and Western education. For Mall interculturality derives from the overlapping of cultures that do not exist on their own. Intercultural philosophy is by no means a romantic notion for anything non-European but an attitude which has to precede philosophical thinking. Only then comparative philosophy becomes possible. Mall has worked out a hermeneutic he calls 'analogous', which moves between two hermeneutic extremes, namely radical difference and total identity. Working out overlappings despite differences enables to understand other cultures not identical to one's own. Mall pleads for abandonment of any claim to absolute right in theory as well as practice.

=== Franz Martin Wimmer ===
Wimmer (born 1942) is an associate professor at the University of Vienna. It is important to him to liberate the concept of philosophy from eurocentrism. He defines the contents of philosophy regarding to questions asked. Any tradition concerning themselves with either logic, ontology, epistemology or the justification of norms and values is indeed philosophical. Philosophy should be intercultural all the time even though it isn't yet so. It is quite a 'predicament of culturality' that philosophy claims to be universal but on the other hand will always be embedded in culture, certain means of expression and certain questions. Wimmer concerns himself with the history of philosophical thought which has to be rewritten in order to include other traditions beside the occidental. He also wants to develop ways to enable intercultural dialogues, or 'polylogues', as he calls them.

=== Peter Raine ===
In Who guards the guardians: intercultural dialogue on environmental guardianship, Raine works through stages of intercultural guardianship for the purpose of discussing guardianship of nature. There are many approaches that are not based on scientific rationality which need to be heard in the 21st century. How do we talk with, and understand, radically different experiences of reality from our own. The approach is not only intercultural, but also philosophical and theological.

== Approaches to an intercultural dialogue ==
When working with different cultures one can't just insist of one's own methods and ask everyone else to do so as well. Communications have to be adapted to this new situation. Many philosophers of intercultural thought suggest similar but nonetheless different rules or guidelines when approaching other traditions.

=== Polylogue ===
This is a concept of the Austrian philosopher Franz Martin Wimmer. He postulates that within interculturally orientated philosophy methods have to be found which disable any rash universalism or relativistic particularism. When making other voices heard, so to speak, not only should be asked what they say and why but also with what justification and due to what believes and convictions. Between radicalism and universalism there has to be a third way to carry out the program of philosophy with the help of other cultures. Wimmer calls this way polylogue, a dialogue of many. Answers to thematic questions should be worked out during such a polylogue. He drafts a 'minimal rule': never accept a philosophical thesis from an author of a single cultural tradition to be well founded. But how does a polylogue look like? Wimmer assumes an issue relevant in four traditions (A, B, C and D) for the sake of illustration. The can have one-sided influence (→) or reciprocal influence (↔). There are different models to be distinguished:

One-sided influence

A → B and A → C and A → D

In this model there is no dialogue possible. It is the goal the expansion of tradition A together with the extinction of cultures such as B, C and D. The reaction of those doesn't have to be the same. The may fiercely object or completely imitate tradition A. This is an example for eurocentrism.

One-sided and transitive influence

A → B and A → C and A → D and B → C

In this model dialogues aren't necessary as well. A continues to be the most influential culture, B ignores D, C ignores D. It may be due to the twofold influence upon C that comparative notions occur. 12

Partly reciprocal influence

There are many forms such as:

A ↔ B and A → C and A → D

or:

A ↔ B and A → C and A → D and B → C

up to:

A ↔ B and A ↔ C and A ↔ D and B ↔ C and B ↔ D and C → D

All forms here can be seen as selective acculturation. There are some dialogues or even polylogues possible, with the exception of D.

Complete reciprocal influence: the polylogue

A ↔ B and A ↔ C and A ↔ D and B ↔ C and B ↔ D and C ↔ D

For each tradition is the other quite interesting which is the consistent model for intercultural philosophy. Reciprocal influence happens based on complete equality. Of course in when it comes to practical use it might not be as carefully balanced. One tradition may be more interested in the second than the third which is a common difficulty regarding intercultural dialogue in general.

=== Rules of thumb ===
Elmar Holenstein (born 1937) is a Swiss philosopher who concerns himself with questions regarding phenomenology and philosophy of language and culture. He observes a number of rules of thumb that make it possible to avoid intercultural misunderstandings for the most part.

Rule of logical rationality – One has to assume that thoughts not logical to oneself do not make the culture or tradition alogical or prelogical but rather that one has misunderstood them.

Rule of teleological rationality (functionality rule) – People pursue an end in what they do and don't only express themselves with logical rationality. It is easy to misunderstand if one cannot distinguish logical and teleological rationality, the literal meaning of a sentence and the goal pursued with it.

Humanity rule (naturalness rule) – Before meaningless, unnatural, non-human or immature behaviour and corresponding values are attributed to people of another culture, it is better to begin by doubting the adequacy of one's own judgement and knowledge.

Nos-quoque rule (we-do-it-too-rule) – If one encounters something in a foreign culture which one is completely unwilling to accept without contradiction, it is not unlikely that one will find comparable, if not worse occurrences in one's own culture, historical and contemporary.

Vos-quoque rule (you-do-it-too-rule) – Considering the former rule, it is no less probable that one will find persons in the foreign culture who reject the scandalous event as well.

Anti-crypto-racism rule – When people are frustrated, they are inclined to perceive their own shortcomings in magnified form in members of other groups. Crypto-racism, hidden racism, becomes manifest when one's own feeling of superiority is threatened. Foreign cultures have to be analysed to shed a revealing light on one's own culture.

Personality rule – It is possible to avoid misjudgements and tactlessness by never treating members of another culture as objects or means of research, but as research partners of equal right.

Subjectivity rule – A self-image is no more to be taken at face value than are the impressions of an outsider. According to their constitution and the kind of encounter, people tend to overestimate, super-elevate and embellish themselves, or to underestimate, diminish and denigrate themselves.

Ontology-deontology rule (›is‹ versus ›ought‹ rule) – Behaviour codes and constitutional texts do not represent conditions as they are, but as they should be according to the view of the group that have the say. Sometimes they manifest a mirror image of what is not the case but considered proper behaviour.

Depolarization rule (rule against cultural dualism) – Polarisation is an elementary means of reducing complexity and classifying things. Its primary function is not to render things as they in fact are, but rather to represent them in a manner in which they are useful. Polarisations with their simplification, exaggeration, absolutism, and exclusivity are best prevented by comparing several cultures with each other, instead of restricting the comparison to two, and by paying attention to the circumstances under which such a polar relationship between two cultures can be maintained and under what conditions it can also be detected within the cultures that are contrasted with each other.

Non-homogeneity rule – The assumption that cultures are homogeneous is a temptation to place the various eras, trends and formations to be found in them in a uni-linear order as if they are only distinguished by their degree of development and none of them has its own originality and autonomy.

Agnosticism rule – There are mysteries that will remain unanswered in all cultures and across cultures. One has to be prepared for the fact that satisfactory answers might not be found.

=== Gregor Paul's basic rules for intercultural philosophy ===
Paul is an associate professor at the Karlsruhe Institute of Technology. His concerns are epistemology, logic, aesthetics and comparative philosophy as well as human rights. He has formulated 16 methodological rules regarding intercultural philosophy.

1. Ascertain similarities and make them explicit
2. Identify differences, and to describe and explain them
3. Dispel prejudices
4. Avoid mystification and exoticism
5. Assume the existence of universal, logical laws
6. To only compare equalities and to avert category mistakes
7. Avoid generalisations
8. Not to mistake parts of a tradition for the whole (e.g. identify Zen as the Eastern philosophy)

Rules regarding comparative philosophy:

1. Accept the universal validity of the common and pragmatic principle of causality as at least heuristic and pragmatic principle
2. Orient oneself on the existence of anthropological constants
3. To justify the identification of certain issues regarding to similarities and differences, in particular regarding the relevance of those identifications

Comparative philosophy should furthermore meet certain demands:

1. To explicit the underlying and guiding concept of philosophy
2. Avoid ethnocentrism and eurocentrism
3. To use terms such as 'German philosophy' and 'East' and 'West' just as abbreviation for 'philosophy formulated or developed in Germany' and 'philosophy formulated and developed in Asia'

Further common rules:

1. Multidisciplinarity and
2. Contextualisation of important examples.

These 16 rules shall help to enable an exchange between cultures on an equal level.

== Intercultural media ==
Beside the work of individual philosophers journals have been published to spread the intercultural thought and make as many voices heard as possible. Polylog is a journal for intercultural philosophising, published in Vienna, Austria, since 1998 and offers articles mostly in the German language. Simplegadi is also a journal for intercultural philosophy, published in Padua, Italy since 1996. The journal's language is Italian. Since 2010, the Centro Interculturale Dedicato a Raimon Panikkar (Intercultural Centre Dedicated to Raimon Panikkar) publishes Cirpit Review in print or in digital format, promoting and spreading cultural events inspired by Raimon Panikkar's thought.

== See also ==
- Interculturalism
- Intercultural communication
- Perennial philosophy

Traditions

- African philosophy
- American philosophy
- Eastern philosophy
- Middle Eastern philosophy
- Western philosophy
