= Agarak =

Agarak may refer to:

- Agarak, Aragatsotn, a village in the eastern part of the Aragatsotn Province, Armenia
- Agarak, Lori, a village in the Lori Province, Armenia
- Agarak, Syunik, a city in the southern part of the Syunik province, Armenia
- Agarak, Syunik (village), a village in the eastern part of the Syunik province, Armenia
- Agarakavan, a village in the central part of the Aragatsotn Province, Armenia
