= Georgian Orthodox Church =

National Eastern Orthodox church

Apostolic Autocephalous Orthodox Church of Georgia
- საქართველოს სამოციქულო ავტოკეფალური მართლმადიდებელი ეკლესია
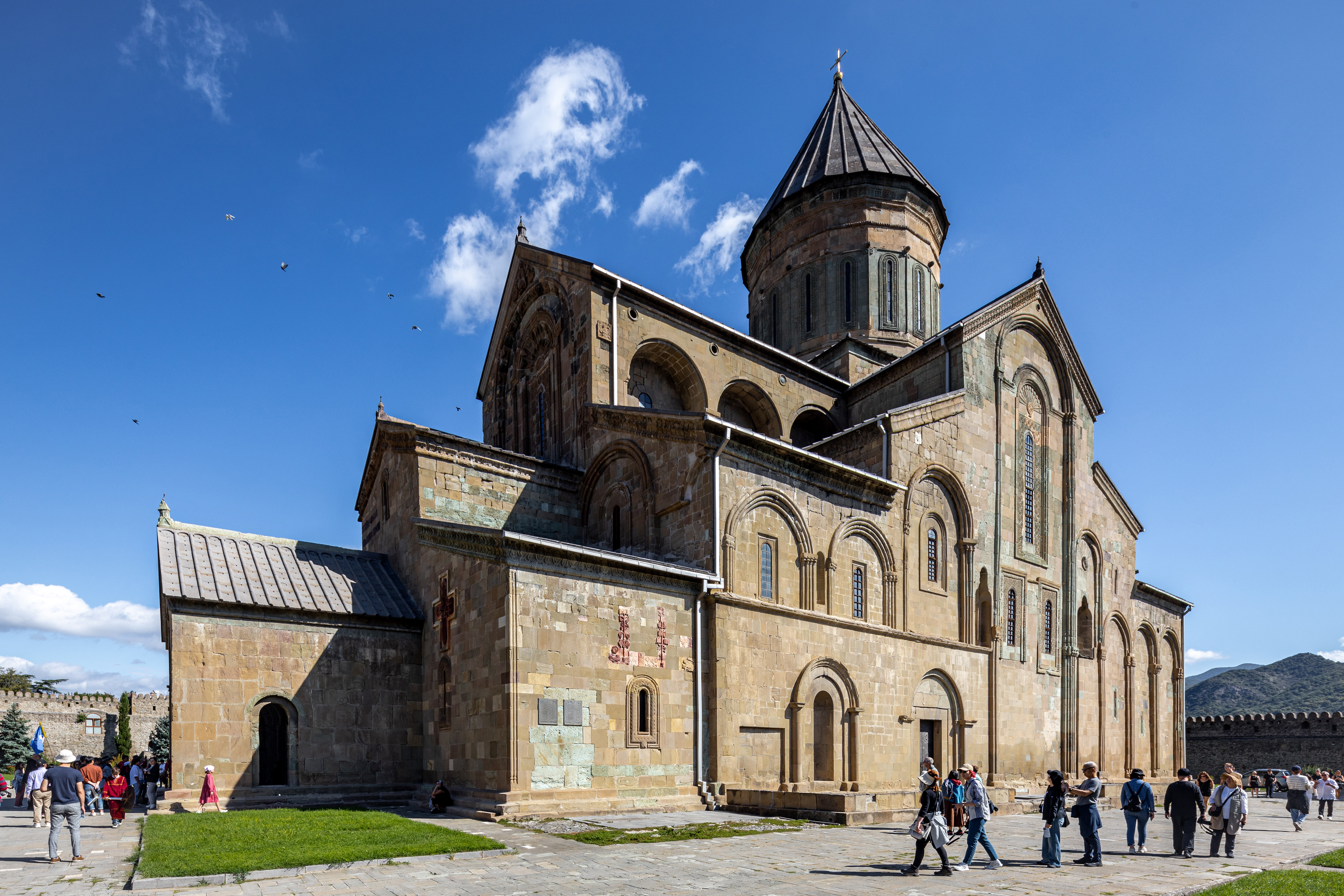
- Svetitskhoveli, the nation's premier patriarchal cathedral and a UNESCO World Heritage Site, in Mtskheta.
- Type: Autocephaly
- Classification: Christian
- Orientation: Eastern Orthodox
- Scripture: Septuagint; New Testament
- Theology: Eastern Orthodox theology
- Polity: Episcopal
- Primate: Shio III, Catholicos-Patriarch of All Georgia
- Eparchies: 50
- Language: Liturgical: Old Georgian
- Liturgy: Byzantine Rite
- Headquarters: Tbilisi, Georgia
- Territory: Georgia
- Possessions: Western Europe, Russia, Turkey, Azerbaijan, Armenia, Jordan, Australia, North America
- Founder: Andrew the Apostle (Colchis); Saint Nino, Mirian III (Iberia)
- Independence: From Patriarchate of Antioch dates vary between 467–491 and 1010, (Note: See below, Autocephaly for details on the process); From Russia in 1917 and 1943.
- Recognition: Autocephaly was granted by the Patriarchate of Antioch, with sources variously dating it to between 467–491 or to 1010. It was abolished by the Russian Orthodox Church in 1811, restored de facto in 1917 and de jure in 1943, and formally recognized by the Ecumenical Patriarchate of Constantinople in 1990.
- Separated from: Patriarchate of Antioch
- Separations: Abkhazian Orthodox Church (2009) (Note: But it is considered part of the Georgian Orthodox Church by every Orthodox patriarchate, including the Russian.)
- Members: 3.5 million
- Official website: www.patriarchate.ge

The Apostolic Autocephalous Orthodox Church of Georgia (Georgian: საქართველოს სამოციქულო ავტოკეფალური მართლმადიდებელი ეკლესია, romanized: sakartvelos samotsikulo avt'ok'epaluri martlmadidebeli ek'lesia), commonly known as the Georgian Orthodox Church or the Orthodox Church of Georgia, is an autocephalous Eastern Orthodox church in full communion with the other Eastern Orthodox churches. It is Georgia's dominant religious institution, and a majority of Georgian people are members. The Orthodox Church of Georgia is one of the oldest churches in the world. It asserts apostolic foundation, and that its historical roots can be traced to the early and late Christianization of Iberia and Colchis by Andrew the Apostle in the 1st century AD and by Saint Nino in the 4th century AD, respectively. As in similar autocephalous Eastern Orthodox Christian churches, the church's highest governing body is the holy synod of bishops. The church is headed by the patriarch of All Georgia, Shio III, who was elected in 2026.

Eastern Orthodox Christianity was the state religion throughout most of Georgia's history until 1921, when the country, having declared independence from Russia in 1918, was occupied by the Red Army during the Soviet invasion of Georgia, becoming part of the Soviet Union. The current Constitution of Georgia recognizes the special role of the Georgian Orthodox Church in the country's history, but also stipulates the independence of the church from the state. Government relations are further defined and regulated by the Concordat of 2002.

The Georgian Orthodox Church consistently ranks among the most influential institutions in the country. Although the 71% reported having a positive view of the church in 2023, trust in the church has declined since its peak in the late 2000s, with a parallel increase in the number of people who are ambivalent, and regular church attendance is generally low, as in many European countries.

== History ==
=== Origins ===
==== Traditions regarding Christianity's first appearance in Iberia and Colchis ====
According to Georgian Orthodox Church tradition, the first preacher of the Gospel in Colchis and the Kingdom of Iberia (modern-day western and eastern Georgia) was the apostle Andrew, the First-Called. According to the official church account, Andrew preached across Georgia, carrying with him an acheiropoieta of the Virgin Mary (an icon believed to have been created "not by human hand"), and founded Christian communities believed to be the direct ancestors of the church. However, modern historiography considers this account mythical and the product of a late tradition derived from 9th-century Byzantine legends about the travels of St. Andrew in eastern Christendom. Similar traditions regarding Saint Andrew exist in Ukraine, Cyprus, and Romania. Other apostles claimed by the church to have preached in Georgia include Simon the Canaanite (better known in the West as Simon the Zealot), who is said to have been buried near Sokhumi, in the village of Anakopia, and Saint Matthias, who is said to have preached in the southwest of Georgia and to have been buried in Gonio, a village not far from Batumi. The church also claims the presence in Georgia of the Apostles Bartholomew and Thaddeus, who are said to have come north from Armenia.

==== Conversion of Iberia ====
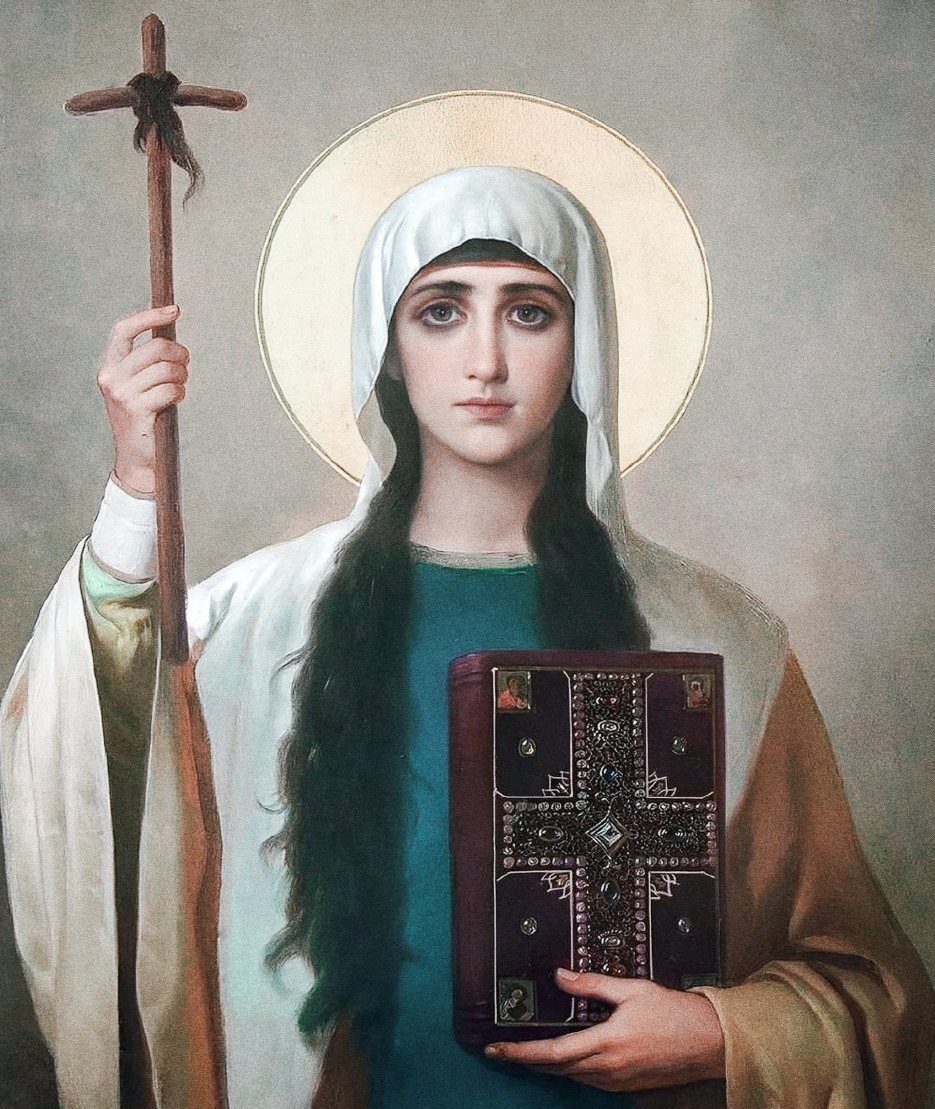
Saint Nino of Cappadocia, baptizer of the Georgians.

The propagation of Christianity in present-day Georgia before the 4th century is still poorly known. The first documented event in this process is the preaching of Saint Nino and its consequences, although the exact dates are still debated. Saint Nino, honored as Equal to the Apostles, was, according to tradition, the daughter of a Roman general from Cappadocia. She preached in the Caucasian Kingdom of Iberia (also known as Kartli) in the first half of the 4th century, and her intercession eventually led to the conversion of King Mirian III, his wife, Queen (later Saint) Nana, and their family. Cyril Toumanoff dates the conversion of Mirian to 334, and his official baptism and subsequent adoption of Christianity as the official religion of Iberia to 337.

From the first centuries C.E., the cult of Mithras, pagan beliefs, and Zoroastrianism were commonly practiced in Georgia. However, they gradually began to decline, even though Zoroastrianism became a second established religion of Iberia after the Peace of Acilisene in 378, and more precisely by the mid-fifth century.

The royal baptism and the organization of the church were accomplished by priests sent from Constantinople by Constantine the Great. The conversion of the people of Iberia proceeded quickly in the plains, but pagan beliefs long persisted in the mountain regions. The western Kingdom of Lazica was politically and culturally distinct from Iberia at that time, and culturally more integrated into the Roman Empire; some of its cities already had bishops by the time of the First Council of Nicaea (325).

=== Expansion and transformation of the church ===
The conversion of Iberia marked only the beginning of the formation of the Georgian Orthodox Church. In the following centuries, various processes took place that shaped the church and gave it, by the beginning of the 11th century, the main characteristics that it has retained to this day. These processes concerned the institutional status of the church within Eastern Christianity, its evolution into a national church with authority over all of Georgia, and the dogmatic development of the church.

==== Autocephaly ====
In the 4th and 5th centuries, the Church of Iberia was strictly subordinated to the Apostolic See of Antioch: all of its bishops were consecrated in Antioch before being sent to Iberia. Around 480, "[i]n an attempt to secure Kartvelian support and to acknowledge local support for the empire, the Byzantine government recognized – and perhaps itself instigated – the change in status of the Kartvelian chief prelate from archbishop to catholicos".

"According to the Antiochene canonist and patriarch Theodore Balsamon (1140–95), 'When the Lord Peter was the Holy Patriarch of the great and godly city of Antioch, the Synod decided to make the Church of Iberia autocephalous.'" The patriarch he refers to must be Peter the Fuller (ca. 488). Even so, the church in Iberia did not gain complete independence from the mother church of Antioch. The church remained subordinate to the Antiochian Church; the catholicos could appoint local bishops, but until the 740s his own election had to be confirmed by the synod of the Church of Antioch, and even after the 8th century annual payments were made to the Greek Orthodox Church of Antioch. "This situation of continuing canonical dependence was altered after the 11th century, when the catholicos of Mtskheta extended his jurisdiction over western Georgia. Since then, the head of the autocephalous Church of Georgia has been the catholicos-patriarch of all Georgia, and the church has been fully independent in its domestic and foreign affairs, with the exception of the period between 1811 and 1917. Melchisedek I (1010–33) was the first catholicos-patriarch of all Georgia."

However, other sources state that autocephaly was granted to the church at different dates. Ronald Roberson gives 467 as the year the Church became autocephalous. The Encyclopedia Britannica states that the autocephaly of the Church "was probably granted by the Eastern Roman emperor Zeno (474–491) with the consent of the patriarch of Antioch, Peter the Fuller." Other sources indicate 484 as the year the church became autocephalous. Rapp states that "Fully-fledged autocephaly [of the Georgian Church] would not be achieved [...] until the Arab conquest or later."

==== Territorial expansion and birth of a national church ====
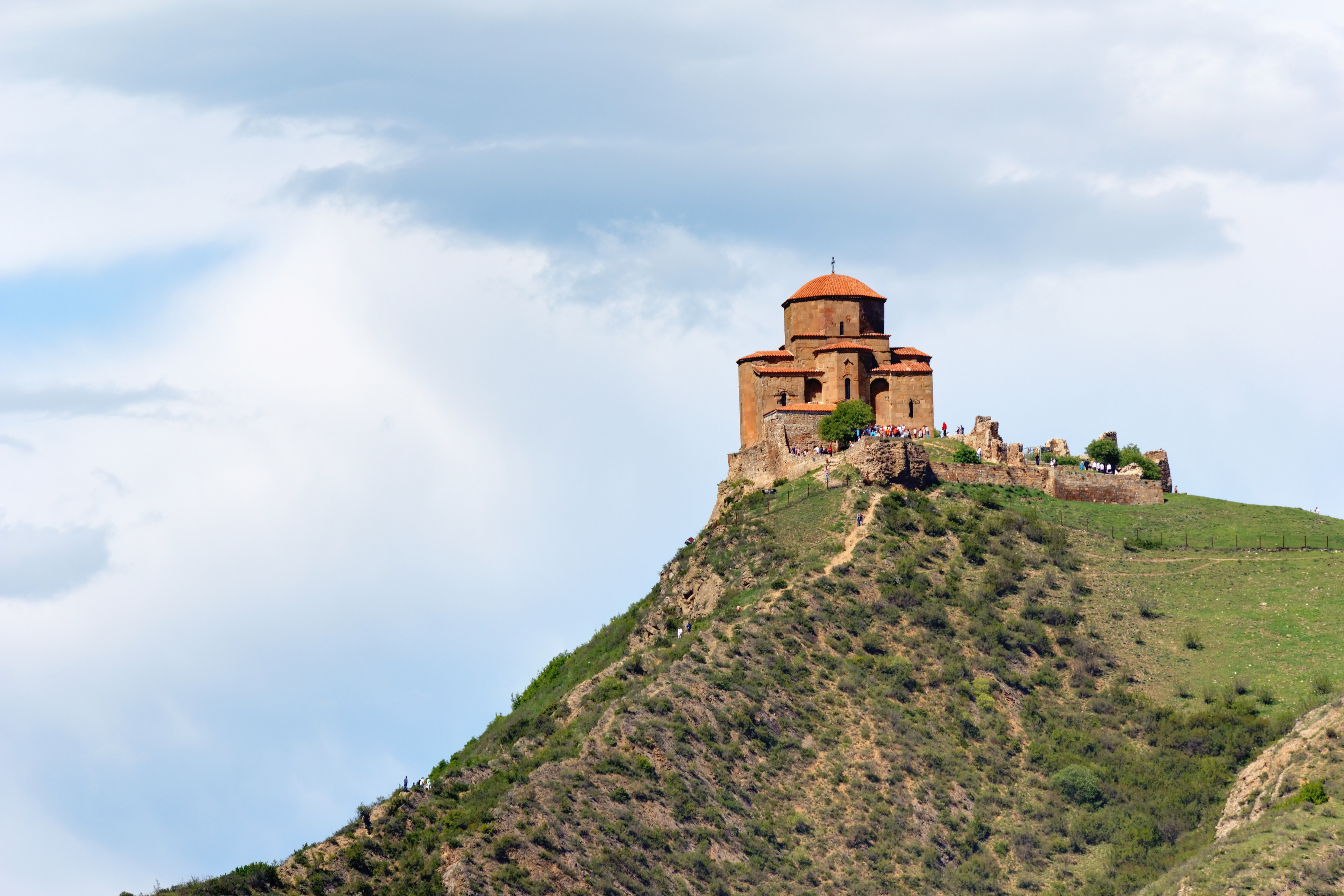
Jvari Monastery, near Mtskheta, one of Georgia's oldest surviving monasteries (6th century)

Flag of the Georgian Orthodox Church used since Medieval times

At the beginning of the church’s history, what is now Georgia was not yet politically unified, and would not be until the beginning of the 11th century. The western half of the country, mostly constituted by the kingdom of Lazica, or Egrisi, was under much stronger influence from the Byzantine Empire than eastern Iberia, where Byzantine, Armenian, and Persian influences coexisted. Such division was reflected in major differences in the development of Christianity.

In the east, from the conversion of Mirian, the church developed under the protection of the kings of Iberia, or Kartli. A major factor in the development of the church in Iberia was the introduction of the Georgian alphabet. The impulse for a script adapted to the language of the local people stemmed from efforts to evangelize the population. A similar dynamic led to the creation of the Armenian alphabet. The exact origin of the script is still debated, but it must have emerged in the second half of the 4th century or the early 5th century.

The introduction of monasticism and its tremendous development in Iberia in the 6th century encouraged both foreign cultural influences and the development of local written works. From that moment, together with translations of the Bible, ecclesiastical literature in Georgian was produced in Iberia, most prominently biographies of saints, such as the "Martyrdom of the Holy Queen Shushanik" and the "Martyrdom of Saint Abo". Many of the saints from the first centuries of the church were not ethnic Georgians (Shushanik was an Armenian princess, and Abo an Arab), showing that the church had not yet acquired a strictly national character.

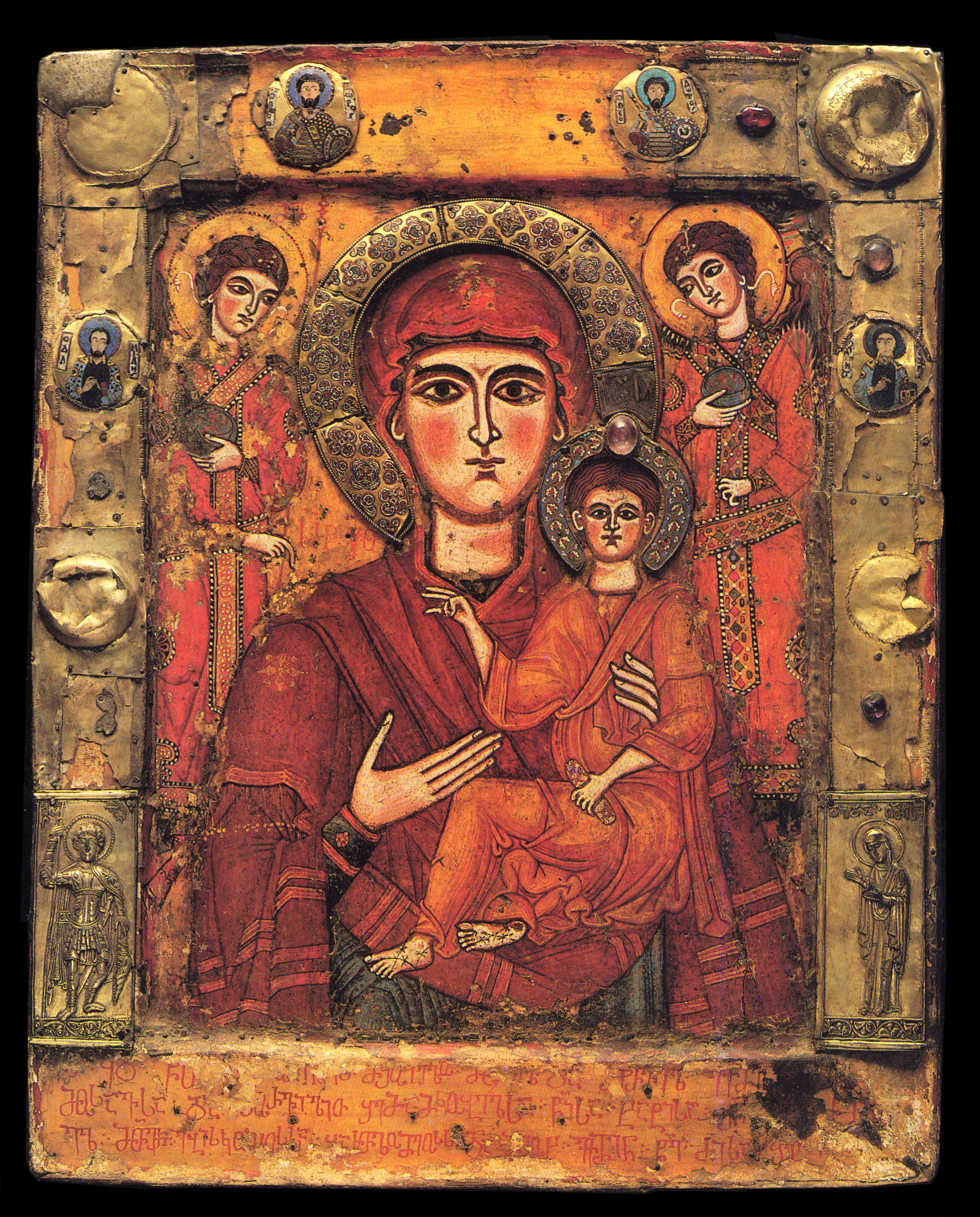
Virgin Mary as Hodegetria with Archangels from the Tsilkani Cathedral in Georgia, 13th century

This changed only during the 7th century, after the wide political and cultural changes brought about by the Muslim conquests. This new menace to local culture, religion, and autonomy, and the difficulties in maintaining constant contact with other Christian communities, led to a drastic cultural change within the church, which became ethnically focused for the first time: it evolved into a "Kartvelian Church". The bishops and Catholicos were now all ethnic Georgians, as were the saints whose "Lives" were written from that period.

In the western half of Georgia, ancient Colchis, which had remained under stronger Roman influence, local churches were under the jurisdiction of the Patriarchate of Constantinople and were culturally and linguistically Hellenistic. Bishops from the port cities took part in ecumenical councils, from the Council of Nicaea (325), together with those from the Byzantine territories. From the 6th century, those churches, whose language remained Greek, were headed by a metropolitan in Phasis.

The integration of the Black Sea coastal regions into what came to be known as Georgia was a long process. A first step came with the Arab invasions of the 7th and 8th centuries, which mostly affected Iberia. Refugees, among them noblemen such as Archil of Kakheti, took shelter in the West, either in Abkhazia or Tao-Klarjeti, and brought their culture with them. Such movements led to the progressive merging of the western and eastern churches under the latter, as Byzantine power decreased and doctrinal differences disappeared. The western church broke away from Constantinople and recognized the authority of the Catholicos of Mtskheta by the end of the 9th century. Political unification under the Bagrationi dynasty consolidated this evolution by the end of the 10th century: in a single, unified Kingdom of Georgia, there would be a unified Georgian Church.

==== Relations with the Armenian and Byzantine churches ====
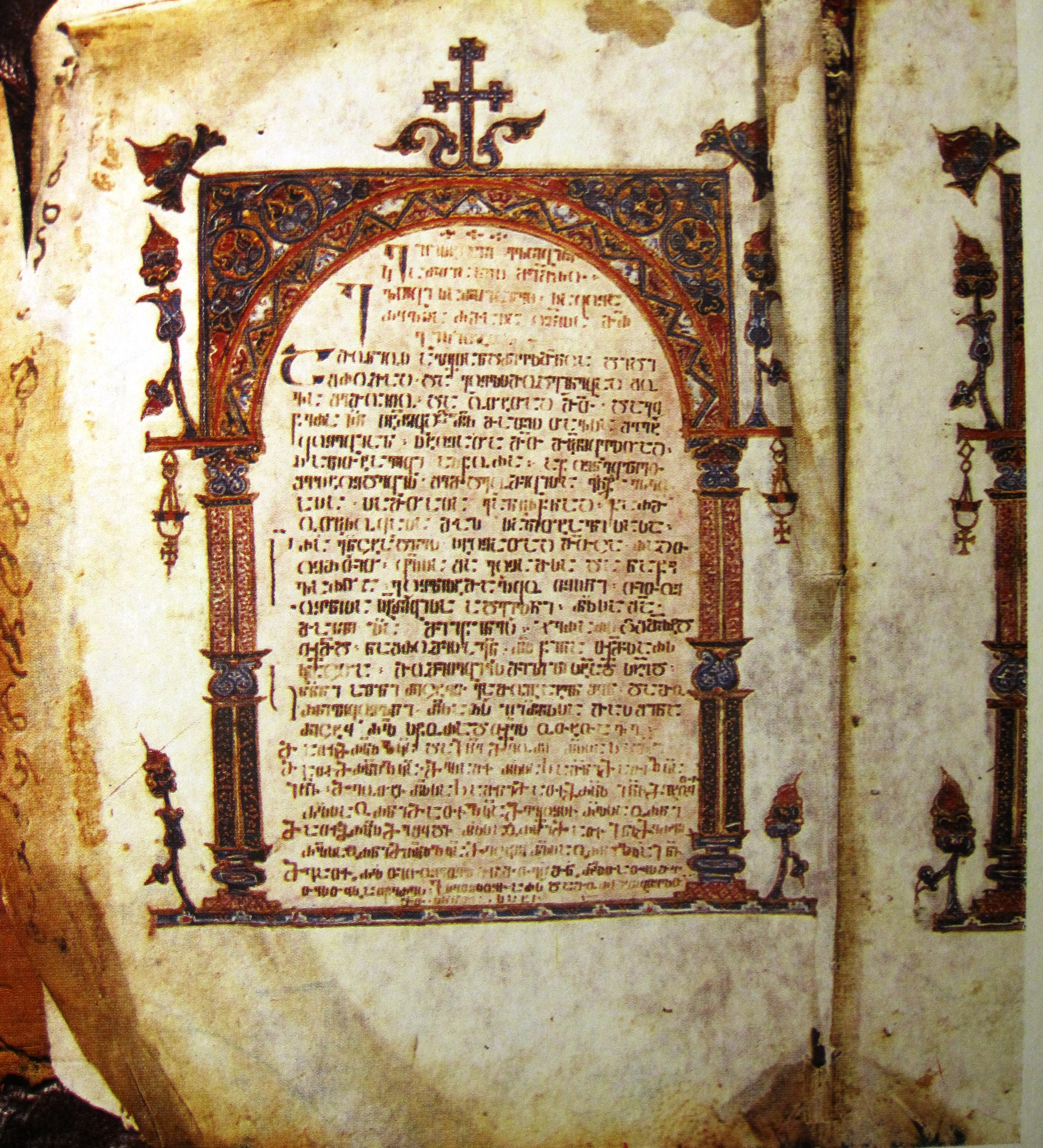
Alaverdi Gospels, an 11th-century Georgian illuminated manuscript Gospel Book

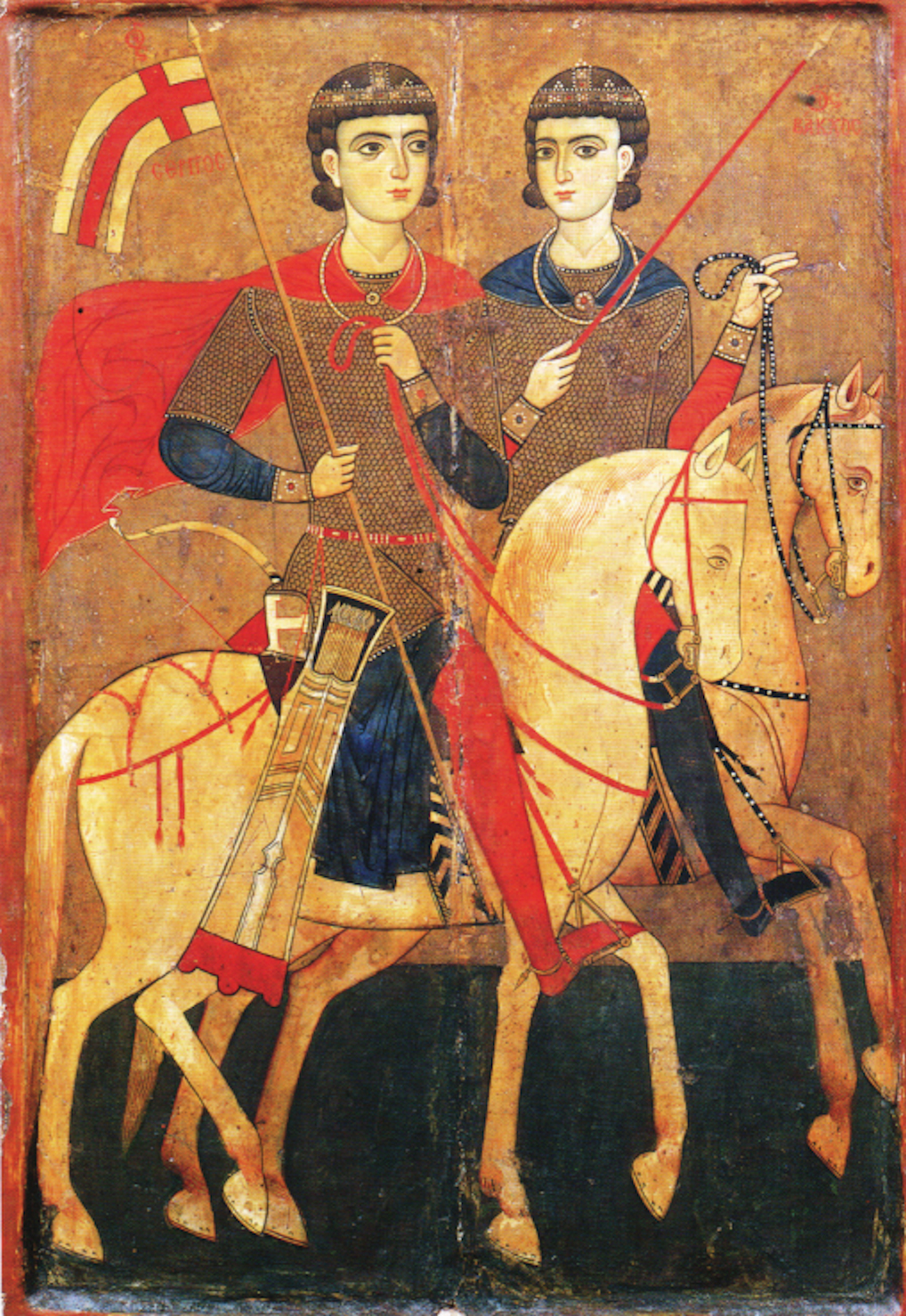
Georgian icon of Saints Sergius and Bacchus from Saint Catherine's Monastery, Mount Sinai, second half of the 13th century.

During the first centuries of Christianity, the South Caucasus was culturally much more united than in later periods, and constant interactions between what would become the Georgian and Armenian churches shaped both of them. The Armenian Church was founded two decades earlier and, during the 4th century, was larger and more influential than the Church in Iberia. As such, it exerted a strong influence on the early doctrine of the church. The influence of the Church of Jerusalem was also strong, especially in liturgy. The Georgian–Armenian ecclesial relationship would be tested after the Council of Chalcedon (451), whose christological conclusions were rejected by the Armenian Church and important portions of the Church of Antioch, as well as the Coptic Church based in Alexandria.

At first, the Catholicoi of Iberia chose the anti-Chalcedonian camp together with the Armenians, even though diversity of opinion was always present among the clergy and tolerated by the hierarchy. The king of Iberia, Vakhtang Gorgasali, who sought an alliance with Byzantium against the Persians, accepted the Henotikon, a compromise put forward by the Byzantine Emperor Zeno in 482. Such conciliation was attempted again at the First Council of Dvin in 506, and the status quo was preserved during the 6th century.

Around 600, however, tensions flared between the Armenian Apostolic Church and the church in Iberia, as the Armenian Church attempted to assert prominence in the Caucasus in both hierarchical and doctrinal matters, whereas the Catholicos of Mtskheta, Kirion I, leaned towards the Byzantine, Chalcedonian side of the debate, as Iberia was once again seeking imperial support against the Sassanid Empire, which had abolished the kingdom in 580. The Third Council of Dvin, in 607, sanctioned the rupture with the Armenian Church.

The following centuries confirmed the Byzantine orientation of the Georgian Church and its estrangement from the Armenian Church. Confessional disputes remained impossible to overcome and were a staple of theological literature in both areas. The integration of western and eastern Georgian churches from the 9th century also sealed the Orthodox nature of the Georgian Church, as Byzantine liturgy and cultural forms spread to the detriment of traditional Oriental practices.

=== Georgian Church during the Golden Age of Georgia ===
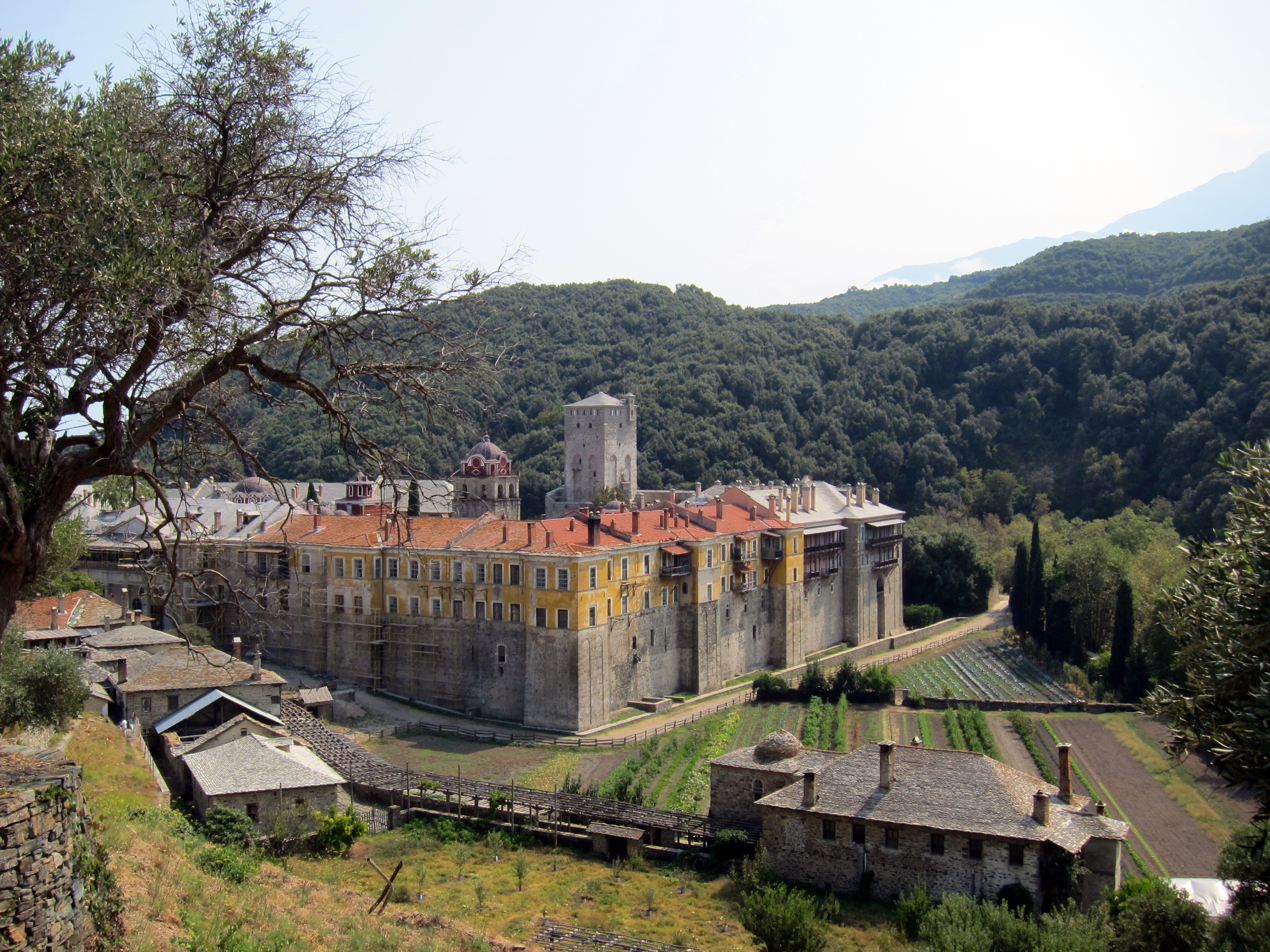
Throughout the Middle Ages, the Georgian Orthodox Church supported monasteries at holy sites outside of Georgia, such as this Iviron Monastery in Greece.

Between the 11th and the early 13th centuries, Georgia experienced a political, economic, and cultural golden age, as the Bagrationi dynasty managed to unite the western and eastern halves of the country into a single kingdom. To accomplish that goal, the kings relied heavily on the prestige of the church and secured its political support by granting it numerous economic advantages, immunity from taxes, and large appanages. At the same time, the kings, most notably David the Builder (1089–1125), used state power to get the church affairs in order. In 1103, he convened the council of Ruisi-Urbnisi, which condemned Armenian Miaphysitism more strongly than ever before and granted unprecedented power, second only to the patriarch, to his friend and advisor George of Chqondidi. For the following centuries, the church remained a crucial feudal institution, whose economic and political power was always at least equal to that of the main noble families.

Throughout the Middle Ages, Georgia played a significant role in supporting Orthodox Christian communities throughout the Balkans and the Holy Land, with significant contributions to religious centers such as the Bachkovo Monastery in Bulgaria, Monastery of the Cross in Jerusalem and the Monastery of Iviron in Greece. Georgian monarchs and members of the nobility made substantial donations to local churches, including financial contributions, manuscripts, and liturgical objects. Rulers such as Queen Tamar, David VIII, and George V the Brilliant engaged in diplomatic negotiations with the sultans of Egypt to secure and enhance the legal and religious rights of Orthodox Christians in the Holy Land. During this period, Georgia also maintained close ecclesiastical ties with the major patriarchates and was periodically visited by the patriarchs of Jerusalem and Antioch, as well as other high-ranking clergy.

=== Cultural influence of Christianity in Medieval Georgia ===
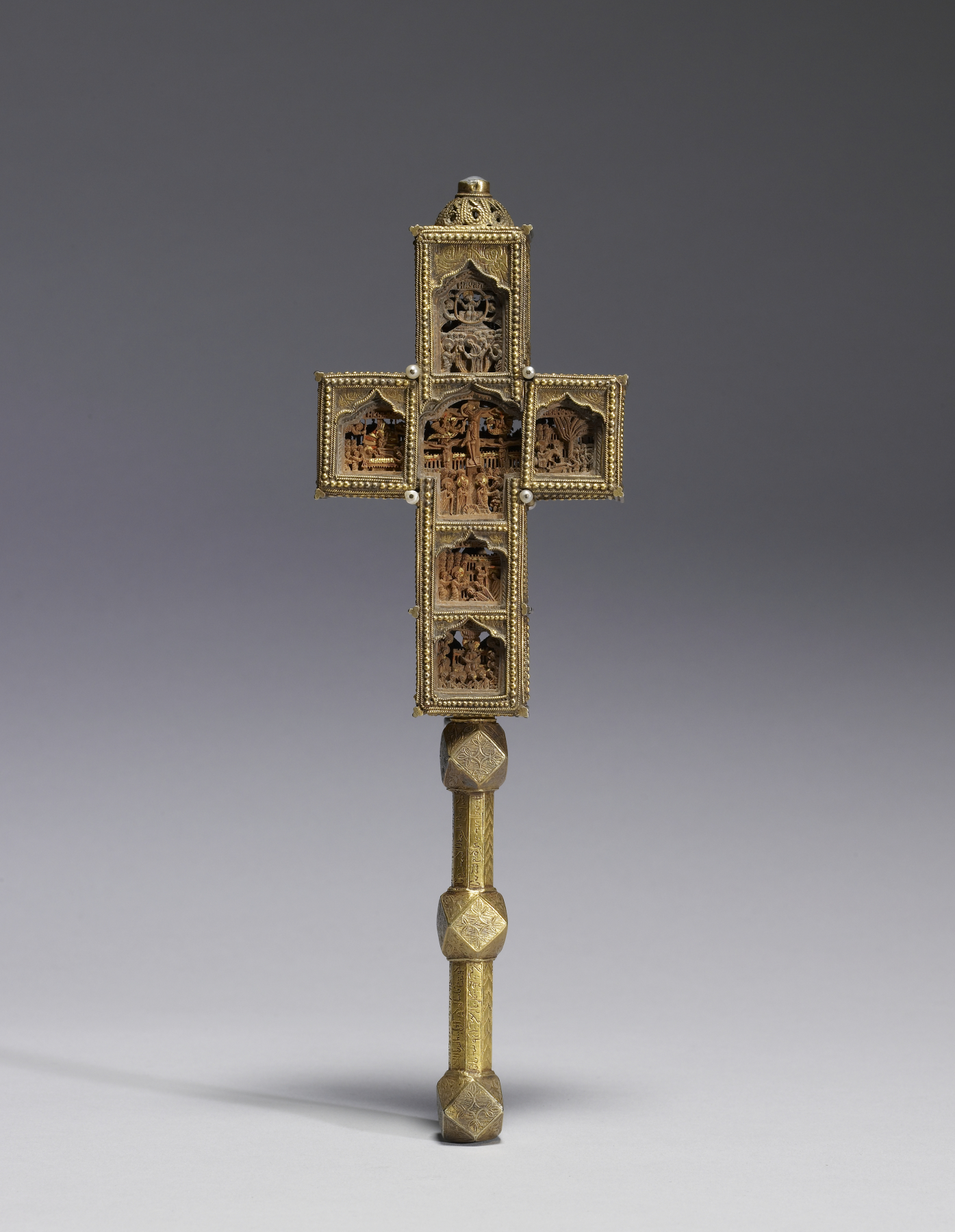
A benediction cross of Catholicos-Patriarch Domentius IV of Georgia showing scenes of the Triumphal Entry, Crucifixion and Ascension of Jesus, the Dormition of the Mother of God, the Raising of Lazarus, and Pentecost. In an inscription on the handle of the cross in the Georgian Mkhedruli script, the Catholicos-Patriarch asks for the "forgiveness of his sins" (kept at the Walters Art Museum in the United States).

During the Middle Ages, Christianity was the central element of Georgian culture. The development of a written Georgian culture was made possible by the creation of the Georgian alphabet for evangelization purposes. Monasticism played a major role in the ensuing cultural transformation. It began in Georgia in the 6th century, when Assyrian ascetic monks, known as the Thirteen Assyrian Fathers, settled in Iberia and founded a series of monasteries, most notably David Gareja. They were soon joined by local monks, which led to the creation of significant works of hagiographic literature in Georgian, such as the "Life of Saint Nino" and the "Martyrdom of the Holy Queen Shushanik". The golden age of Georgian monasticism lasted from the 9th to the 11th century. During that period, Georgian monasteries were founded outside the country, most notably on Mount Sinai, Mount Athos (the Iviron monastery, where the Theotokos Iverskaya icon is still located), and in Palestine. The most prominent figure in the history of Georgian monasticism is considered to be Gregory of Khandzta (759–861), who founded numerous communities in Tao-Klarjeti.

Specific forms of art were developed in Georgia for religious purposes. Among them were calligraphy, polyphonic church singing, cloisonné enamel icons such as the Khakhuli triptych, and the "Georgian cross-dome style" of architecture, which characterizes most medieval Georgian churches. The most celebrated examples of Georgian religious architecture of the time include the Gelati Monastery and Bagrati Cathedral in Kutaisi, the Ikalto Monastery complex and Academy, and the Svetitskhoveli Cathedral in Mtskheta.

Outstanding Georgian representatives of Christian culture include Peter the Iberian (Petre Iberieli, 5th century), Euthymius of Athos (Ekvtime Atoneli, 955–1028), George of Athos (Giorgi Atoneli, 1009–1065), Arsen Ikaltoeli (11th century), and Ephrem Mtsire (11th century). Philosophy flourished between the 11th and 13th centuries, especially at the Academy of Gelati Monastery, where Ioane Petritsi attempted a synthesis of Christian, Aristotelian, and neoplatonic thought.

=== Division of the church (13th–18th centuries) ===
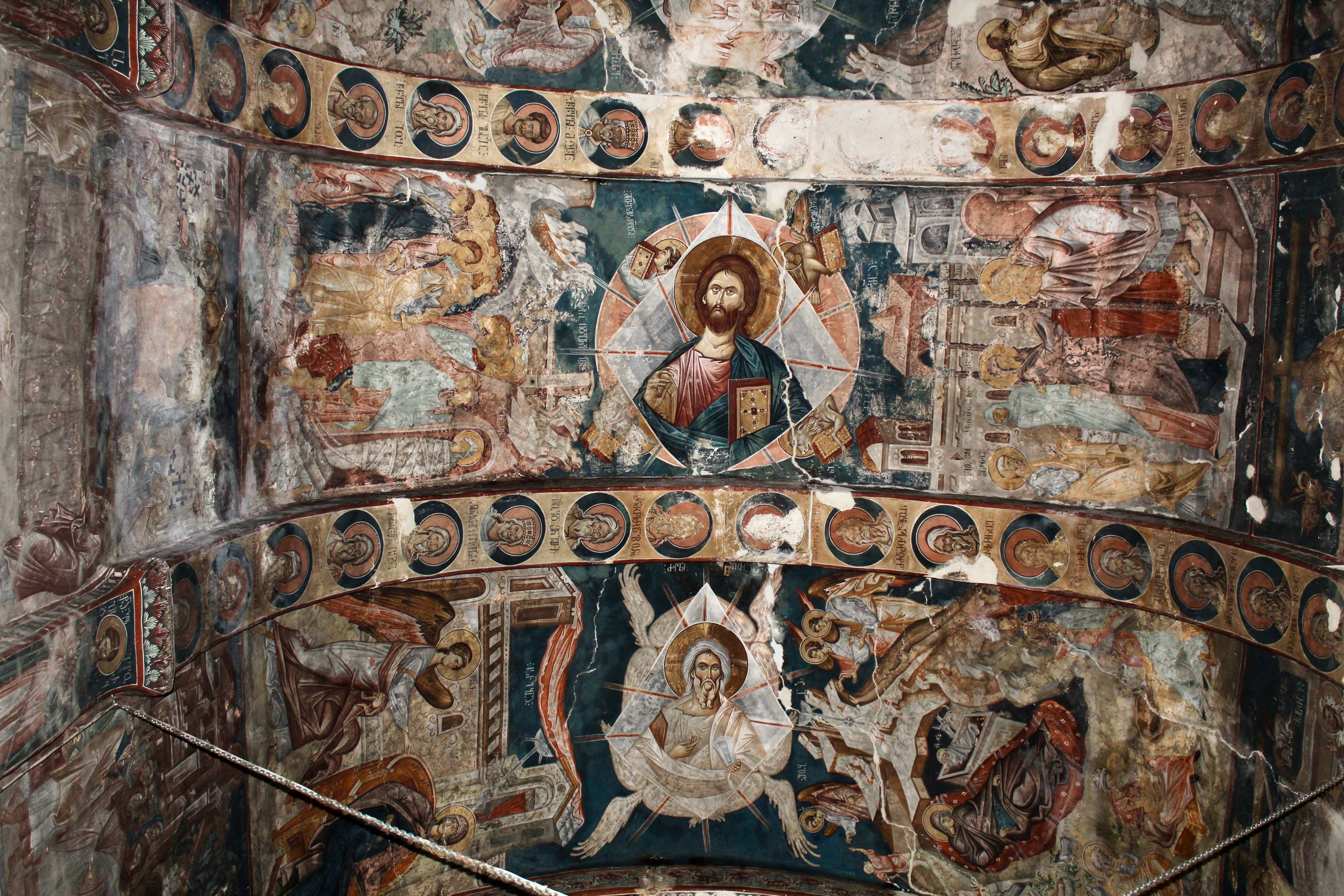
In a fresco of the Ancient of Days painted by Damiane, the upper parts of the Ubisi vault feature three medallions in a row, with Jesus depicted as Pantocrator. The procession of the symbolical dove of the Holy Spirit is shown alongside scenes of the Annunciation, the Nativity, the Baptism, the Transfiguration, and the Pentecost. The mural is dated to around the mid-14th century.

The Mongol invasions in the 13th century and Tamerlane’s invasions in the 14th–15th centuries greatly disrupted Georgian Christianity. Churches and monasteries were targeted by the invaders, as they often housed valuable treasures. As a result of these devastations, many religious buildings fell into disrepair or were abandoned. The political unity of the country was broken several times, finally collapsing in the 1460s.

In western Georgia, the Catholicate of Abkhazia emerged as a distinct ecclesiastical institution. Its establishment was closely linked to the efforts of the kings of Imereti to consolidate political control and legitimize their rule over the western regions. With the central Georgian Orthodox Church, based in Mtskheta, under the influence of rival eastern authorities, a local, independent Catholicate allowed the Imeretian monarchy to oversee ecclesiastical appointments, secure the loyalty of the clergy, and reinforce its sovereignty. The head of the western church adopted the title of patriarch, establishing a religious center in competition with the eastern church. The seat of the Catholicate was initially located at Pitsunda and later moved to the Gelati Monastery near Kutaisi, remaining in operation until 1795.

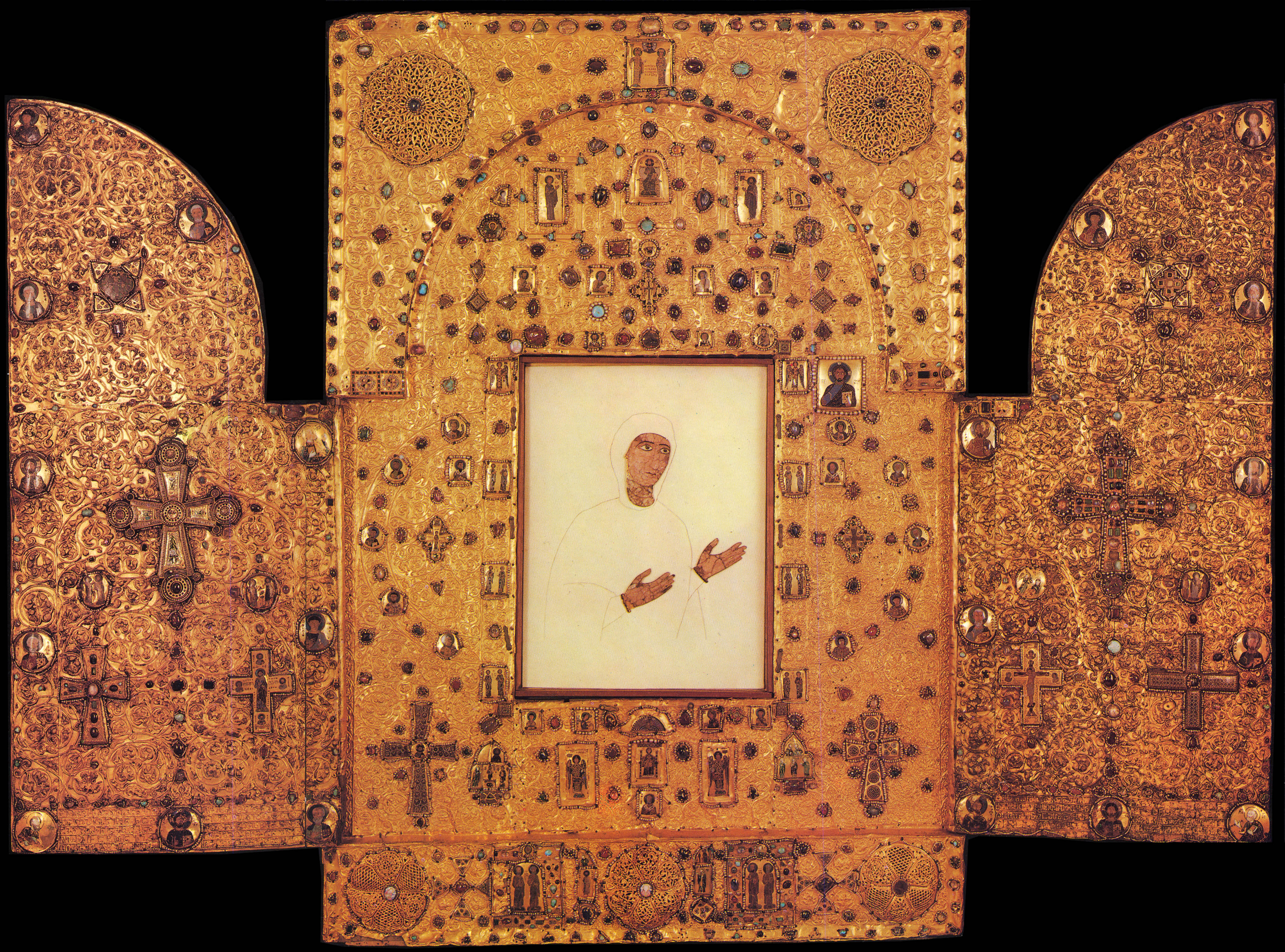
Khakhuli triptych, 12th-century Georgian enamel triptych icon

During this period, contacts with the Catholic Church increased, first as a way to free itself from Byzantine interference, and later to find stronger allies against invaders. Between 1328 and the early 16th century, a Catholic bishop had his see in Tbilisi to foster those contacts. However, formal reunion with Rome never occurred, and the church remained faithful to Eastern Orthodoxy.

In the following centuries, Georgia, weakened and fragmented, fell under the domination of the Ottoman and successive Persian (Safavid, Afsharid, and Qajar) Empires: mostly, the Ottomans ruled the west of the country, the Persians the east, while generally allowing autonomous Georgian kingdoms to subsist under their control. With the fall of Constantinople in 1453, Georgian Christians had lost their traditional recourse against Muslims and were left to fend for themselves.

New martyrs were canonized by the church after each invasion, most notably Queen Ketevan of Kakheti, who was tortured to death in 1624 for refusing to renounce Christianity on the orders of Abbas I of Persia (Shah Abbas). Not all members of the royal families of Kartli and Kakheti were so faithful to the church, however. Many, in order to gain Persian favor and secure the throne over their brothers, converted to Islam or feigned conversion, such as David XI (Daud Khan). Other noblemen, such as Sulkhan-Saba Orbeliani, abandoned the weakened local church for Catholicism, as missionaries were bringing the printing press and western culture to Georgia around 1700. Only the emergence of a strong Orthodox power, the Russian Empire, could reinforce the status and prestige of the church among the elites during the 18th century, and shared Orthodoxy became a potent factor in calls for Russian intervention in the Caucasus to liberate Georgia from Muslim domination.

=== Under Russian and Soviet rule ===
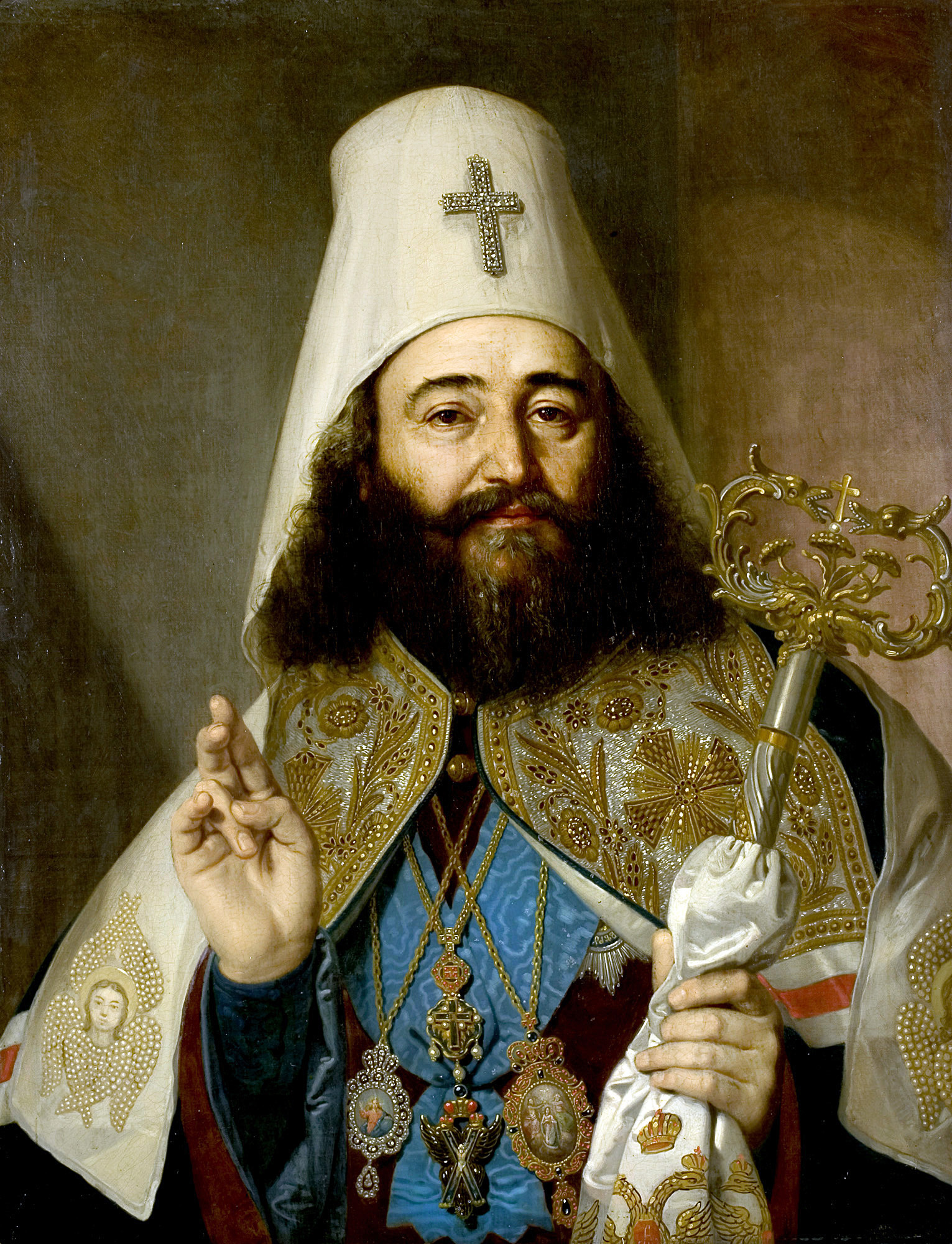
Patriarch Anton II of Georgia was demoted to archbishop by the Russian Imperial authorities.

In 1801, the Kingdom of Kartl-Kakheti (Eastern Georgia) was occupied and annexed by the Russian Empire. On 18 July 1811, the autocephalous status of the Georgian Church was abolished by the Russian authorities, despite strong opposition in Georgia, and the Georgian Church was placed under the synodical rule of the Russian Orthodox Church. From 1817, the metropolitan bishop, or exarch, in charge of the church was an ethnic Russian, with no knowledge of the Georgian language or culture. The Georgian liturgy was suppressed and replaced with Church Slavonic, ancient frescoes were whitewashed in many churches, and the publication of religious literature in Georgian was heavily censored. Calls for autocephaly were heard again only after the intellectual national revival that began in the 1870s; the local clergy made such calls during the 1905 revolution, before being repressed again.

Following the overthrow of Tsar Nicholas II in March 1917, Georgia's bishops unilaterally restored the autocephaly of the Georgian Orthodox Church on 25 March 1917. These changes were not recognized by the Russian Orthodox Church. After the Red Army invasion of Georgia in 1921, the Georgian Orthodox Church was subjected to intense harassment. Hundreds of churches were closed by the atheist government, and hundreds of monks were killed during Joseph Stalin's purges. The independence of the Georgian Orthodox Church was finally recognized by the Russian Orthodox Church on 31 October 1943; this move was ordered by Stalin as part of a wartime policy more tolerant toward Christianity in the Soviet Union. New anti-religious campaigns took place after the war, especially under Nikita Khrushchev. Corruption and infiltration by the security organs also plagued the church. The first signs of revival appeared in the 1970s, when Eduard Shevardnadze, then secretary of the Georgian SSR's Communist Party, adopted a more tolerant stance, and new Patriarch Ilia II was able, from 1977, to renovate derelict churches and even build new ones. At the same time, nationalist dissidents such as Zviad Gamsakhurdia emphasized the Christian nature of their struggle against Communist power and developed relations with church officials that would bear fruit after 1989.

=== Present-day status ===
Eparchies of the Georgian Apostolic Autocephalous Orthodox Church, as of 2010

On 25 January 1990, the Patriarch of Constantinople recognized and approved the autocephaly of the Georgian Orthodox Church (which had in practice been exercised, or at least claimed, since the 5th century) as well as the patriarchal honour of the Catholicos. Georgia's subsequent independence in 1991 saw a major revival in the fortunes of the Georgian Orthodox Church.

The special role of the church in the history of the country is recognized in Article 9 of the Constitution of Georgia; its status and relations with the state were further defined in the Constitutional Agreement, or Concordat, signed by President of Georgia Eduard Shevardnadze and Patriarch Ilia II on 14 October 2002. The Concordat notably recognizes church ownership of all churches and monasteries and grants it a special consultative role in government, especially in matters of education. Many churches and monasteries have been rebuilt or renovated since independence, often with help from the state or wealthy individuals. The church has enjoyed good relations with all three Presidents of Georgia since independence was restored. However, tensions persist within the church itself regarding its participation in the ecumenical movement, which Patriarch Ilia II had endorsed (he served as head of the World Council of Churches between 1977 and 1983). Opposition to ecumenism was fueled by fears of massive proselytizing by Protestant denominations in Georgia. In 1997, faced with open dissension from leading monks, Ilia II rescinded church participation in international ecumenical organizations, though he stopped short of denouncing ecumenism as "heresy." Opposition to Protestant missionary activity has remained strong in contemporary Georgia and has even led to episodes of violence. Separatism in Abkhazia has also affected the church: the Eparchy of Sukhumi, regrouping Abkhaz clergy, proclaimed in 2009 its secession from the Georgian Orthodox Church to form a new Abkhazian Orthodox Church; this move, however, remained unrecognized by any other Orthodox authorities, including the Russian Orthodox Church. Relations with the neighboring Armenian Apostolic Church have also been uneasy since independence, notably due to various conflicts about church ownership in both countries. In the 2002 census, 83.9% of Georgia's population identified themselves as Orthodox. In 2002, it was reported that there were 35 eparchies (dioceses) and about 600 churches within the Georgian Orthodox Church, served by 730 priests. The Georgian Orthodox Church had around 3,600,000 members within Georgia, (no sources attempt to count members among the Georgian diaspora).

=== Leak of 2021 ===
On 13 September 2021, hundreds of files related to the clergy of the Georgian Orthodox Church became publicly available on the Internet. From these files, it became known that the State Security Service had been conducting a massive surveillance operation inside the church. The service had been watching and tapping the phones of members of the Synod, the patriarch, his assistants, bishops, priests, and nuns since 2014.

The documents are organized thematically, and some concern criminal activities such as sexual relations with minors, corruption, or espionage for Russia. They also contain information on intimate relationships, drug use, and business activities. According to the Georgian Orthodox Church, "A large part of the released files appears to be falsified; in some cases, falsehood and truth are mixed together, while some parts are indeed true."

=== Proposal to establish Orthodox Christianity as the state religion in 2024 ===
During the 2024 Georgian parliamentary election, the Georgian Dream announced the prospect of a constitutional amendment designating Orthodox Christianity as the state religion.

In contrast, the Georgian Orthodox Church has expressed skepticism, fearing that such a change could compromise its independence and increase government control. High-ranking clergy members, including Metropolitan (now Patriarch) Shio Mujiri and Metropolitan Nikoloz Pachuashvili, have raised concerns about the potential implications of this proposal, arguing that it could alter the traditionally independent yet cooperative relationship between the state and the church, established by the 2002 Concordat.

== Structure ==
=== Holy Synod ===
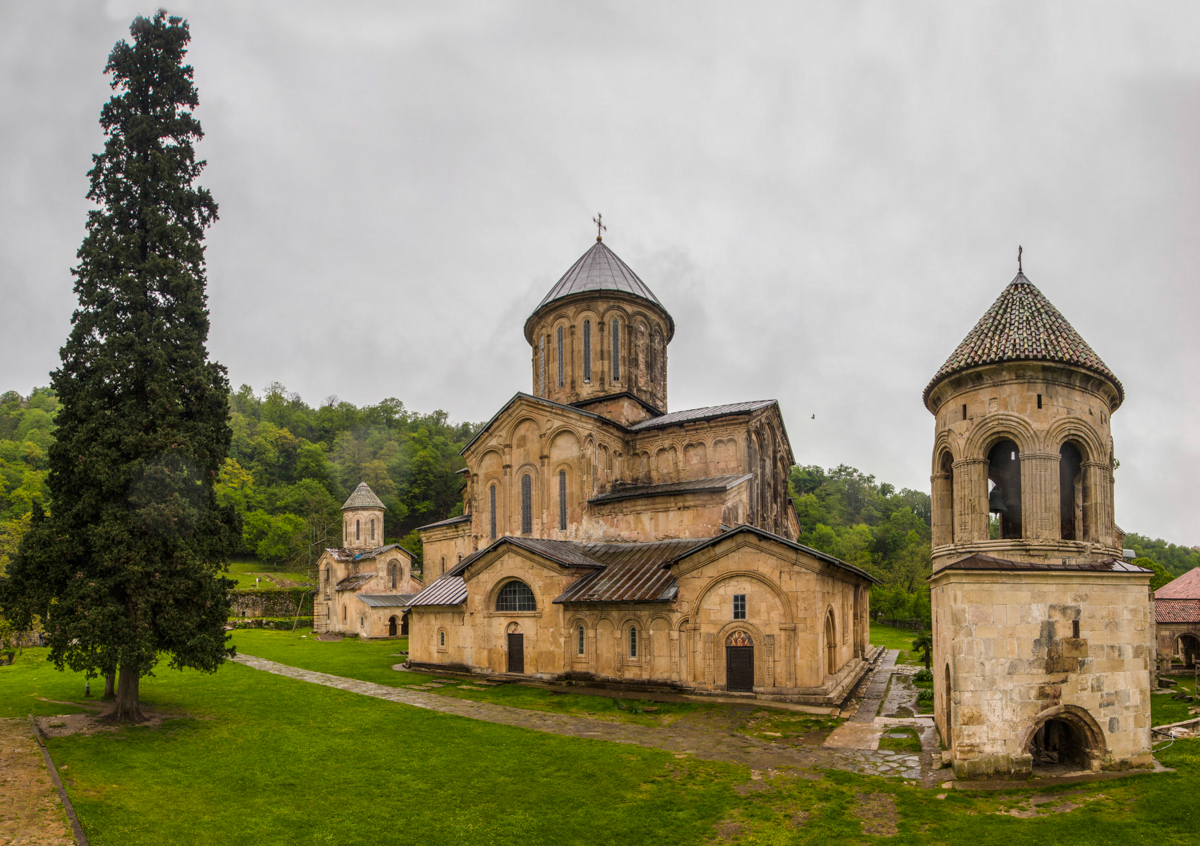
The Gelati Monastery, a UNESCO World Heritage Site.

The Georgian Orthodox Church is managed by the Holy Synod, headed by the Catholicos-Patriarch of All Georgia. The Holy Synod is the collective body of bishops of the church. In addition to the patriarch, the synod comprises 38 members, including 25 metropolitan bishops, 5 archbishops and 7 simple bishops. As of 2012, the following bishops are members of the Holy Synod, in such hierarchical order:

- Metropolitan of Kutaisi and Gelati: Calistratos (Margalitashvili)
- Metropolitan of Chiatura and Sachkhere: Daniel (Datushvili)
- Metropolitan of Western Europe: Abraham (Garmeliya)
- Metropolitan of Tianeti and Pshav-Khevsureti: Tadeos (Ioramashvili)
- Metropolitan of Manglisi and Tsalka: Anania (Japaridze)
- Metropolitan of Margveti and Ubisi: Vakhtang (Akhvledani)
- Metropolitan of Tsilkani and Dusheti: Zosimas (Shioshvili)
- Metropolitan of Tqibuli and Terjola: Giorgi (Shalamberidze)
- Metropolitan of Urbnisi and Ruisi: Job (Akiashvili)
- Metropolitan of Alaverdi: David (Makharadze)
- Metropolitan of Nekresi: Sergios (Chekurishvili)
- Metropolitan of Shemokmedi: Joseph (Kikvadze)
- Metropolitan of Nikozi and Tskhinvali: Isaiah (Chanturia)
- Metropolitan of Borjomi and Bakuriani: Seraphim (Jojua)
- Metropolitan of Nikortsminda: Elise (Jokhadze)
- Metropolitan of Poti and Khobi: Grigori (Berbichashvili)
- Metropolitan of Akhalkalaki and Kumurdo: Nikoloz (Pachuashvili)
- Metropolitan of Akhaltsikhe and Tao-Klarjeti: Theodore (Chuadze)
- Metropolitan of Khoni and Samtredia: Saba (Gagiberiya)
- Metropolitan of Batumi, Lazeti, North America and Canada: Dimitri (Shiolashvili)
- Metropolitan of Vani and Baghdati: Anton (Buluhiya)
- Metropolitan of Zugdidi and Tsaishi: Gerasimos (Sharashenidze)
- Metropolitan of Samtavisi and Gori: Andria (Gvazava)
- Metropolitan of Chkondidi and Martvili: Petre (Tsaava)
- Metropolitan of Senaki, Chkhorotsqu and Australia: Shio (Mujiri)
- Archbishop of Tsageri and Lentekhi: Stepan (Kalaidzhishvili)
- Archbishop of Bodbe: David (Tikaradze)
- Archbishop of Stepantsminda and Khevi: Iegudiel (Tabatadze)
- Archbishop of Rustavi and Marneuli : Ioane (Gamrekeli)
- Archbishop of Dmanisi, Agarak-Tashiri, Great Britain and Ireland: Zenon (Iaradzhuli)
- Bishop of Mestia and Upper Svaneti: Ilarion (Kitiashvili)
- Bishop of Gurjaani and Velistsikhe: Euthymos (Lezhava)
- Bishop of Ninotsminda and Sagarejo: Luka (Lomidze)
- Bishop of Skhalta: Spiridon (Abuladze)
- Bishop of Bolnisi: Ephrem (Gamrekelidze)
- Bishop of Dedoplistsqaro and Hereti: Melchisedek (Khachidze)
- Bishop of Gardabani and Martqopi: Jacob (Iakobishvili)
- Bishop of Surami and Khashuri: Svimeon (Tsakashvili)

=== Catholicos-Patriarch of All Georgia ===
The first head bishop of the Georgia Church to carry the title of Patriarch was Melkisedek I (1010–1033). Since 2026, Shio III (born in 1969) has served as the Catholicos-Patriarch of All Georgia and Archbishop of Mtskheta and Tbilisi. Here is a list of the Catholicos-Patriarchs since the church restored autocephaly in 1917:

- Kyrion II (1917–1918)
- Leonid (1918–1921)
- Ambrose (1921–1927)
- Christophorus III (1927–1932)
- Callistratus (1932–1952)
- Melchizedek III (1952–1960)
- Ephraim II (1960–1972)
- David V (1972–1977)
- Ilia II (1977–2026)
- Shio III (2026–present)

== See also ==
- Georgian Orthodox Church in Azerbaijan
- Georgian Orthodox Church in Turkey
- Georgian Orthodox Church in Armenia
- Eparchies of the Georgian Orthodox Church
- Christianity in Georgia
- Georgian Byzantine-Rite Catholics
- Religion in Georgia
- Secularism and irreligion in Georgia
- Culture of Georgia

== Works cited ==
- Rapp, Stephen H. Jr (2007). "Georgian Christianity". The Blackwell Companion to Eastern Christianity. John Wiley & Sons. pp. 137–155. ISBN 978-1-4443-3361-9.
- Grdzelidze, Tamara (2011). "Georgia, Patriarchal Orthodox Church of". In John Anthony McGuckin (ed.). The Encyclopedia of Eastern Orthodox Christianity. John Wiley & Sons. pp. 264–275. ISBN 978-1-4051-8539-4.
- Mgaloblishvili, Tamila (1998). Ancient Christianity In The Caucasus. Psychology Press. ISBN 978-0-7007-0633-4.
- Toumanoff, Cyril (1963). "Iberia between Chosroid and Bagratid Rule". Studies in Christian Caucasian History. Georgetown UP.
