= Svimeon Tsakashvili =

სვიმეონი Svimeon
- Bishop of Surami and Khashuri
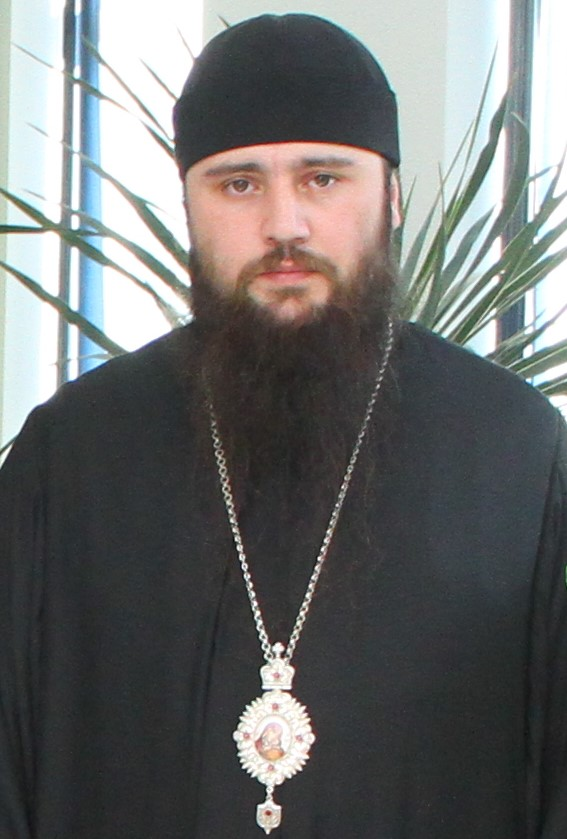
- Church: Georgian Orthodox Church
- Province: Shida Qartli
- Installed: 2013 , November 13

Personal details
- Born: Teimuraz Tsakashvili; August 9, 1982 (age 43)
- Denomination: Eastern Orthodox Church

Svimeon (Georgian: სვიმეონი; born August 9, 1982, in Dedopliststskaro Region, Zemo Machkhaani) is the Bishop of Surami and Khashuri.

== Biography ==
Svimeon was born on the year of 1982, August 9, in the Village Signagi. graduated 100th Public School in Tbilisi in 1999 and the same year he was enrolled the Georgian Technical University, specialty of Mechanics and Machinery. Simultaneously he did the studies in Theology. Since 2000 he had been serving for the Municipality of Dedoplistsqaro in his native region, in the village Zemo Machkhani and he was chairing the restoration-rehabilitation processes of Saint George's Church and the Church of Dormition of the All-holy Theotokos.

== Monastic life ==
The Bishop has been serving for Ruisi Urbnisi Eparchy for a decade and throughout this time he had been serving simultaneously at other monasteries as well, namely in the gorge of Dzama in the Tbeti Monastery where he had been doing his spiritual activities since the age of 21. He was frocked there as a monk in 2005 at the age of 23. On December 4, 2006, at the age of 24 in the Monks' monastery on the holiday of Presentation of the All-holy Theotokos to the Temple, Archbishop Tob of Ruisi and Urbnisi ordained him deacon. On March 1, 2006, Archbishop Iob in the Monastery of Bertubani ordained him into priesthood. He was consecrated as a Vice Abbot of Mary the Egyptian Monastery and after certain period he returned to the Monastery of Tbeti where he served with the rank of priest. Soon the Archbishop Iob made him abbot of Surami Church of Job the Righteous based in the Residence of Eparchy, where he served for a year. Afterwards, during Pentecost, Archbishop Iob made him abbot of the Urbnisi Cathedral Residency Monastery where he also served for a year. During his service he led the restoration of Bermukha Monastery in the Gorge of Dzama. After a year and a half he was set as the Abbot Priest of Saint Nicolas Qintsvisi Monastery. Then he was elevated to Hegumen and was awarded with golden Cross. Later, he became the Chief Priest of Monks’ Monastery of Khashuri Municipality in the village of Khtsisi. After beatification by the Patriarch Ilia II and on behalf of the Archbishop Iob, he led the restoration of Dodo Garejeli Monastery.

== Service as a bishop ==
On November 10, 2013, by the decision of the Holy Synod of the Georgian Orthodox Church, Hegumen Svimeon was ordained into Bishop of Surami and Khashuri. Ordination ceremony was held in the Patriarchal Cathedral of Svetitskhoveli, Mtskheta. His immense merit is to promote new beginnings of Monastery life in K'udaqeti Saint Eliah's Monks’ Monastery. Presently He has been leading Surami-Khashuri Eparchy and the Boarding School of Dimitri K'ipiani.
