= Tsintsadze =

Tsintsadze (Georgian: ცინცაძე) is a Georgian surname. Notable people with the surname include:

- Besa Tsintsadze (born 1969), Georgian figure skater
- Dito Tsintsadze (born 1957), Georgian film director and screenwriter
- Giorgi Tsintsadze (born 1986), Georgian basketball player
- Irakli Tsintsadze (born 1964), Georgian composer
- Ivanna Klympush-Tsintsadze (born 1972), Ukrainian politician and journalist
- Kalistrate Tsintsadze (Callistratus of Georgia; 1866–1952), Catholicos-Patriarch of All Georgia
- Kote Tsintsadze (1887–1930), Georgian communist politician
- Mate Tsintsadze (born 1995), Georgian professional footballer
- Sulkhan Tsintsadze (1925–1991), Georgian composer
