= Archbishop of Margveti =

List of Orthodox Archbishops of Margveti of the Georgian Orthodox and Apostolic Church:

- Konstantine (Metropolitan of Margveti) (until 2002)
- Vakhtang (first archbishop of Margveti, full name Badri Akhvlediani) (since 2002)
