= Callistratus of Georgia =

Catholicos-Patriarch of All Georgia (1932-1952)

His Holiness and Beatitude Callistratus
- The Catholicos-Patriarch of All Georgia, Archbishop of Mtskheta-Tbilisi
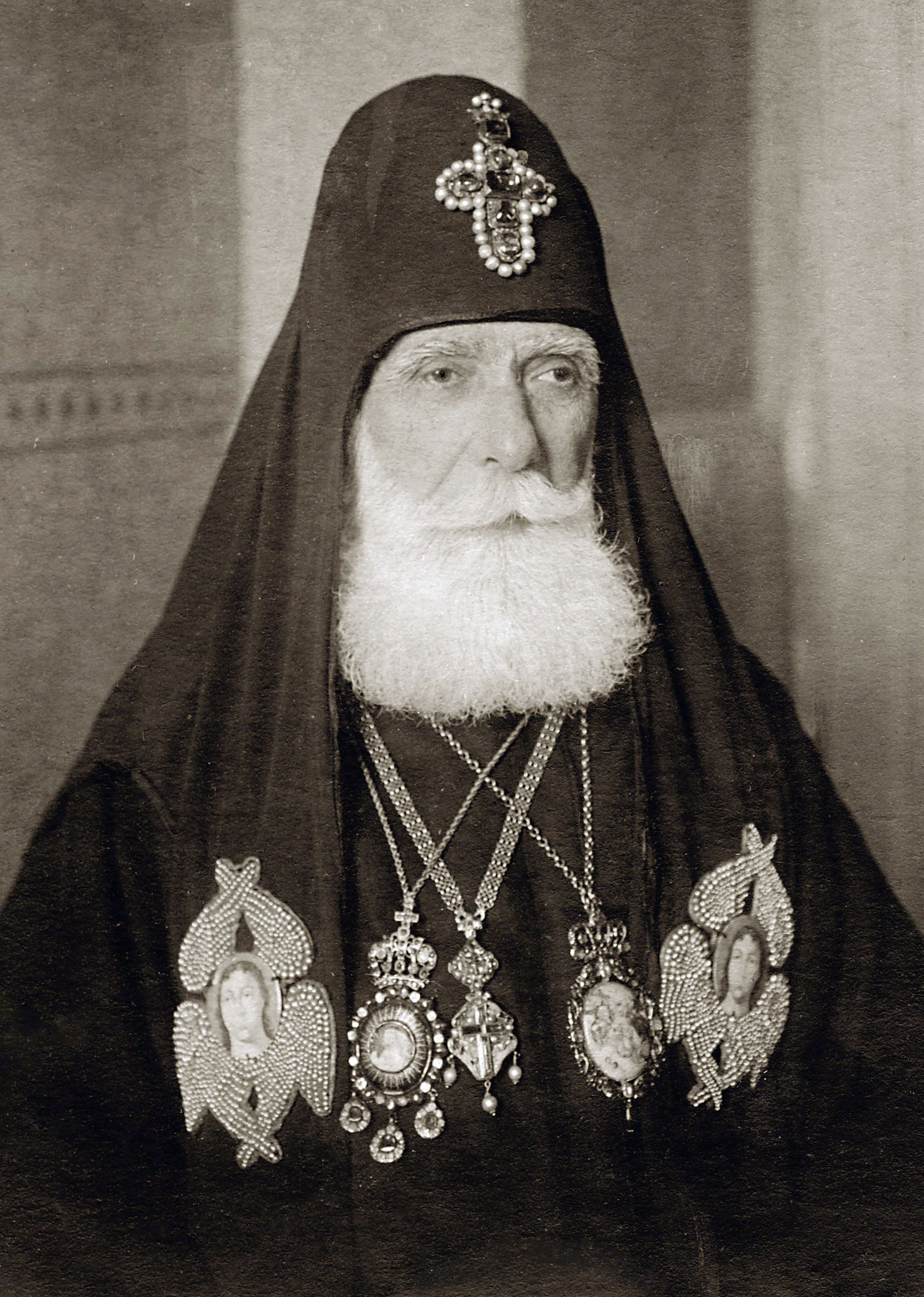
- Church: Georgian Orthodox Church
- Installed: June 21, 1932
- Term ended: February 3, 1952
- Predecessor: Christophorus III
- Successor: Melchizedek III

Orders
- Ordination: April 18, 1893
- Consecration: November 1, 1925

Personal details
- Born: Kallistrate Mikheilsvili Tsintsadze; April 24, 1866 Tobanieri, Kutaisi Governorate, Caucasus Viceroyalty, Russian Empire
- Died: February 2, 1952 (aged 85) Tbilisi, Georgian SSR, Soviet Union
- Denomination: Eastern Orthodox Church
- Occupation: Catholicos-Patriarch

St. Callistratus (Georgian: კალისტრატე, Kalistrate) (Kalistrate Tsintsadze) (April 24, 1866 – February 2, 1952) was Catholicos-Patriarch of All Georgia from June 21, 1932, until his death. His full title was His Holiness and Beatitude, Archbishop of Mtskheta-Tbilisi and Catholicos-Patriarch of All Georgia.

== Biography ==
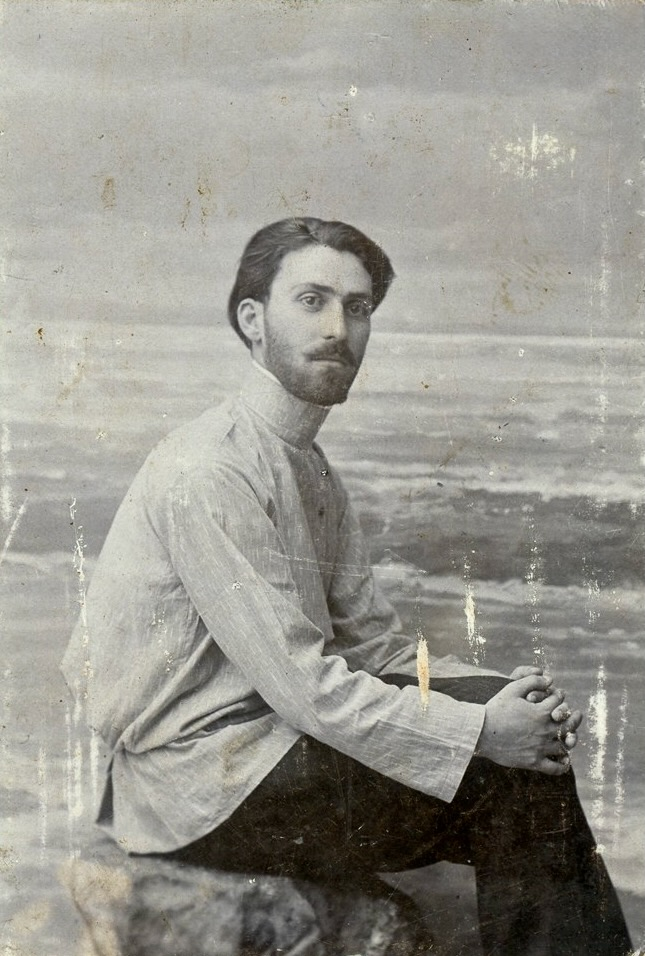
Callistratus as a young man

Saint Callistratus the Confessor

His Holiness and Beatitude the Catholicos-Patriarch of All Georgia
- Venerated in: Eastern Orthodox Church
- Canonized: December 22, 2016 by Georgian Orthodox Church
- Feast: May 21 (June 3 NS)

Educated at the theological seminaries of Tiflis and Kiev, he was ordained to the priesthood at the Didube Church in 1893. He then served at the Kashueti Church (1903) and was involved in the Georgian autocephalist movement in defense of which he produced, in 1905, a special study of the Georgian Orthodox Church, which had been under the Russian control since 1810.

After the reestablishment of the Georgian church in 1917, he was consecrated Metropolitan of Ninotsminda in 1925 at Tbilisi Sioni Cathedral. He was transferred to the Bishporic of Manglisi in 1927. Following the imprisonment of Catholicos Patriarch Ambrose by the Soviet government, Callistratus was a locum tenens from 1923 to 1926.

After his election to the patriarchate in 1932, following a brief reign of Christophorus III, Callistratus tried to pursue a conciliatory line with the Stalin's regime in order to ease the pressure from the authorities.

Through Stalin's mediation, Callistratus reconciled the Georgian church with its Russian counterpart, which in turn recognized the Georgian autocephaly in 1943. In 1948, he was appointed to the Soviet Peace Committee. Despite official Soviet atheist propaganda, Callistratus maintained that Christianity and Communism could coexist. He died in 1952 and was interred at the Tbilisi Sioni Cathedral.

He was canonized by the Georgian Orthodox Church on 22 December 2016, his feast day set for 3 June (NS 21 May).

== See also ==
- Patriarch Ambrose of Georgia
