= Christophorus III =

Catholicos-Patriarch of All Georgia (1927-1932)

His Holiness and Beatitude Christophorus III
- The Catholicos-Patriarch of All Georgia, Archbishop of Mtskheta-Tbilisi
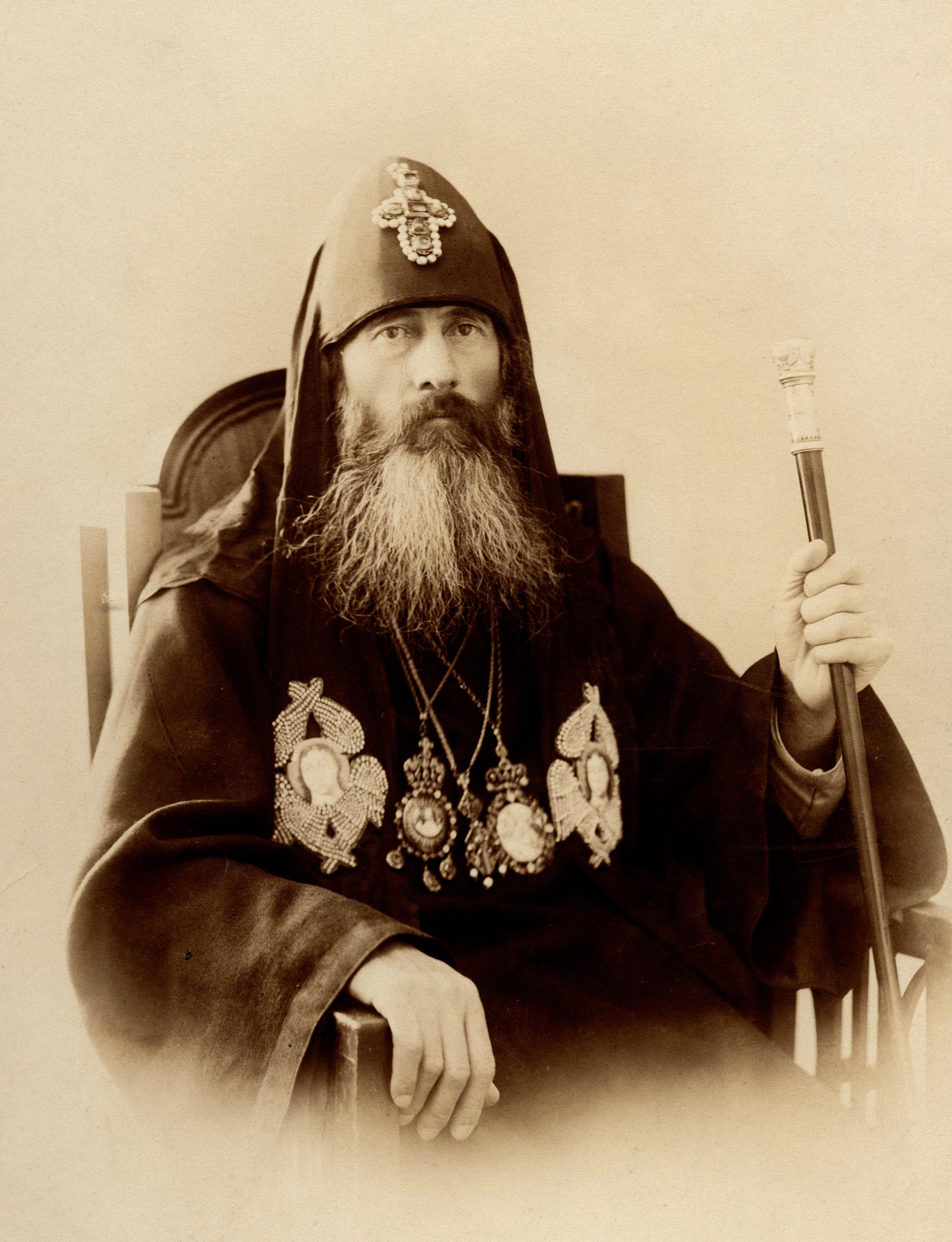
- Church: Georgian Orthodox Church
- Installed: June 4, 1927
- Term ended: January 10, 1932
- Predecessor: Ambrose
- Successor: Callistratus

Orders
- Ordination: 1895

Personal details
- Born: Kristefore Tsitskishvili; March 27, 1873 Kharagauli, Tiflis Governorate, Caucasus Viceroyalty, Russian Empire
- Died: January 10, 1932 (aged 58) Tbilisi, Georgian SSR, Soviet Union
- Denomination: Eastern Orthodox Church
- Occupation: Catholicos-Patriarch

Christophorus III (Georgian: ქრისტეფორე III, K'ristep'ore III) (27 March 1873 – 10 January 1932) was a Catholicos-Patriarch of All Georgia from 1927 until his death in 1932. His tenure coincided with the increasingly repressive Soviet rule in Georgia.

== Biography ==
He was born as Kristefore Tsitskishvili (ქრისტეფორე ციცქიშვილი) on 27 March, 1873, near the town of Kharagauli in the Imereti region of Georgia, then part of the Russian Empire.

In 1895, he graduated from the Tbilisi Spiritual Seminary and began service as a priest, first in the Trans-Caspian region, and later back in Georgia. At the same time, he taught theology and Georgian, and was energetically involved in the movement which led to the restoration of autocephaly of the Georgian Orthodox Church in 1917. Christophorus was consecrated as a bishop of Urbnisi (1921–1925) and metropolitan of Abkhazia (1925–1927).

Elected as the Catholicos-Patriarch on 4 June 1927, Christophorus had to lead the Georgian church in a difficult period under harsh pressure from the Soviet authorities.

He died on 10 January 1932 after a period of illness. Like some of his peers, he was interred at the Tbilisi Sioni Cathedral. Due to the Soviet rule, there was only one small announcement in newspapers, the kind that is usually made for a layperson: “Christopher Tsitskishvili has passed away.” Many people did not even know that this name and surname belonged to the Catholicos-Patriarch of All Georgia.

Eastern Orthodox Church titles
Preceded by Ambrose	Catholicos-Patriarch of All Georgia; 1927–1932	Succeeded by Callistratus
