= Agarak, Lori =

Agarak Ագարակ
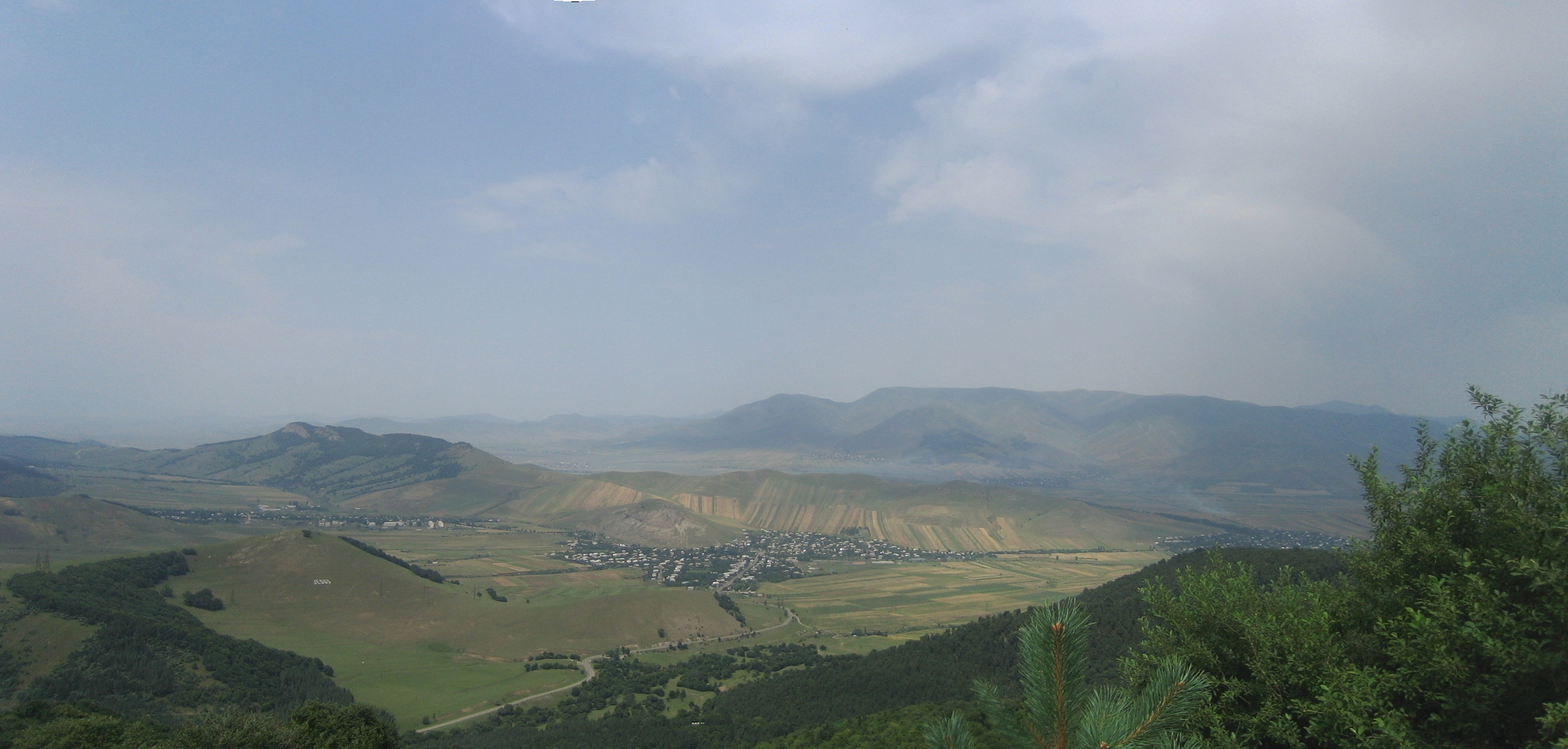
- The northern part of Armenia's northern province of Lori as seen from Pushkin Pass. Visible in this picture is the village of Agarak (background, right)

- Location within Armenia
- Coordinates: 41°00′38″N 44°28′03″E
- Country: Armenia
- Province: Lori

Area
  - Total: 19.31 km^{2} (7.46 sq mi)
- Elevation: 1,375 m (4,511 ft)

Population (2011)
  - Total: 1,155
- Time zone: UTC+4 (AMT)

Agarak (Armenian: Ագարակ) is a village in the Lori Province of Armenia.

== Geography ==
Agarak lies at the end of the H-33 highway. The area is dominated by agriculture.

== Demographics ==
The village had 1,155 inhabitants in 2011.

== Gallery ==
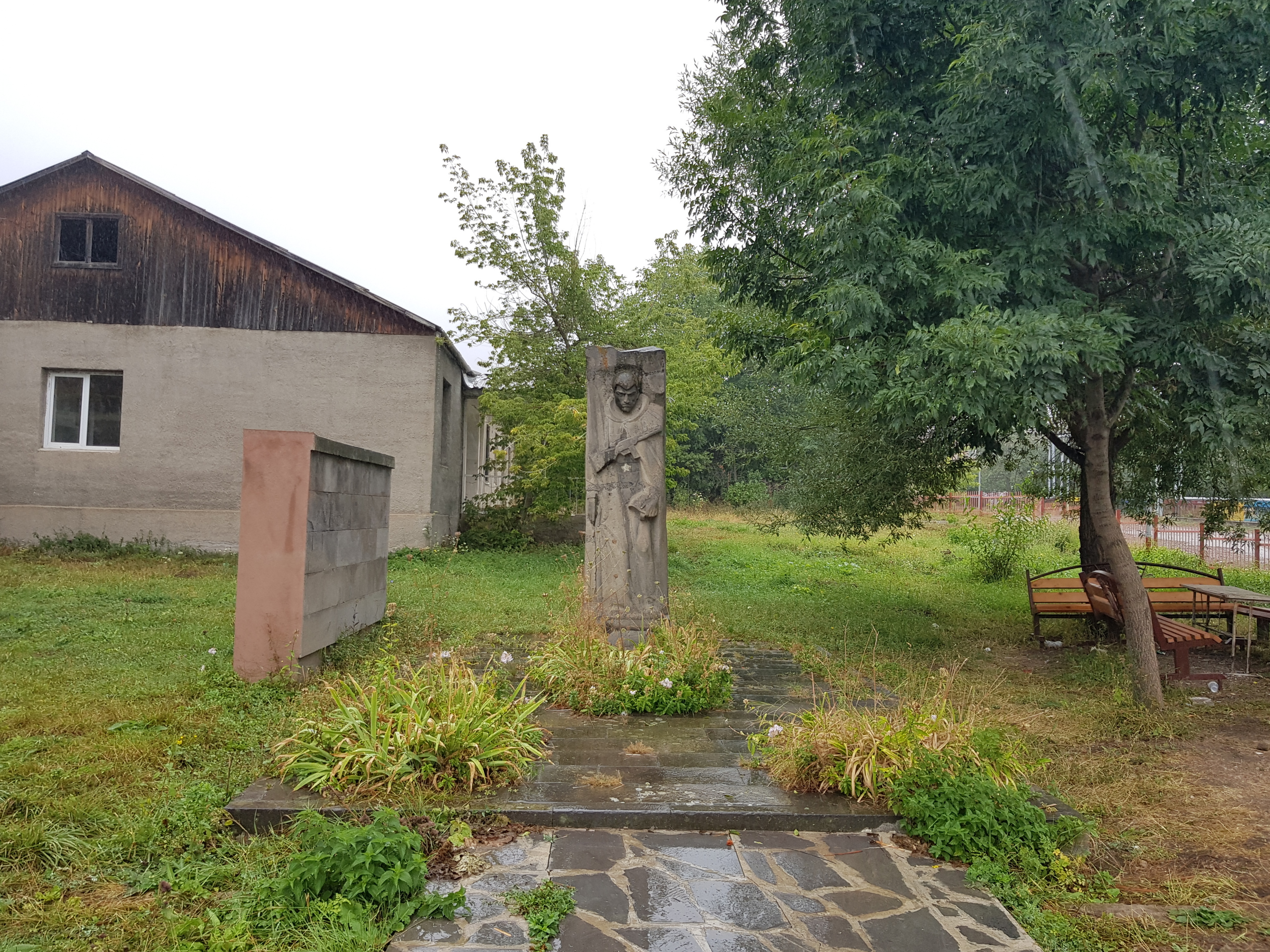

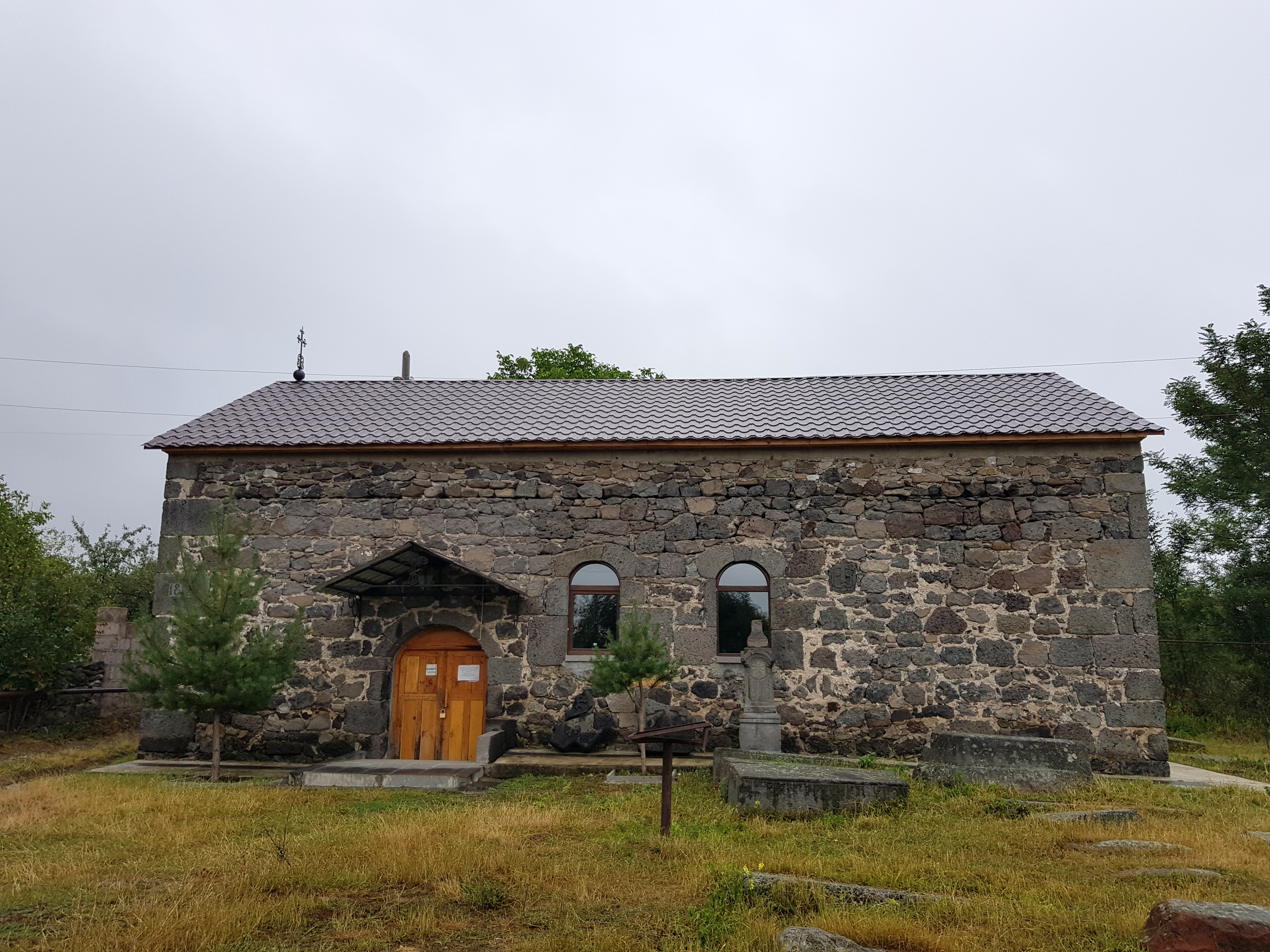

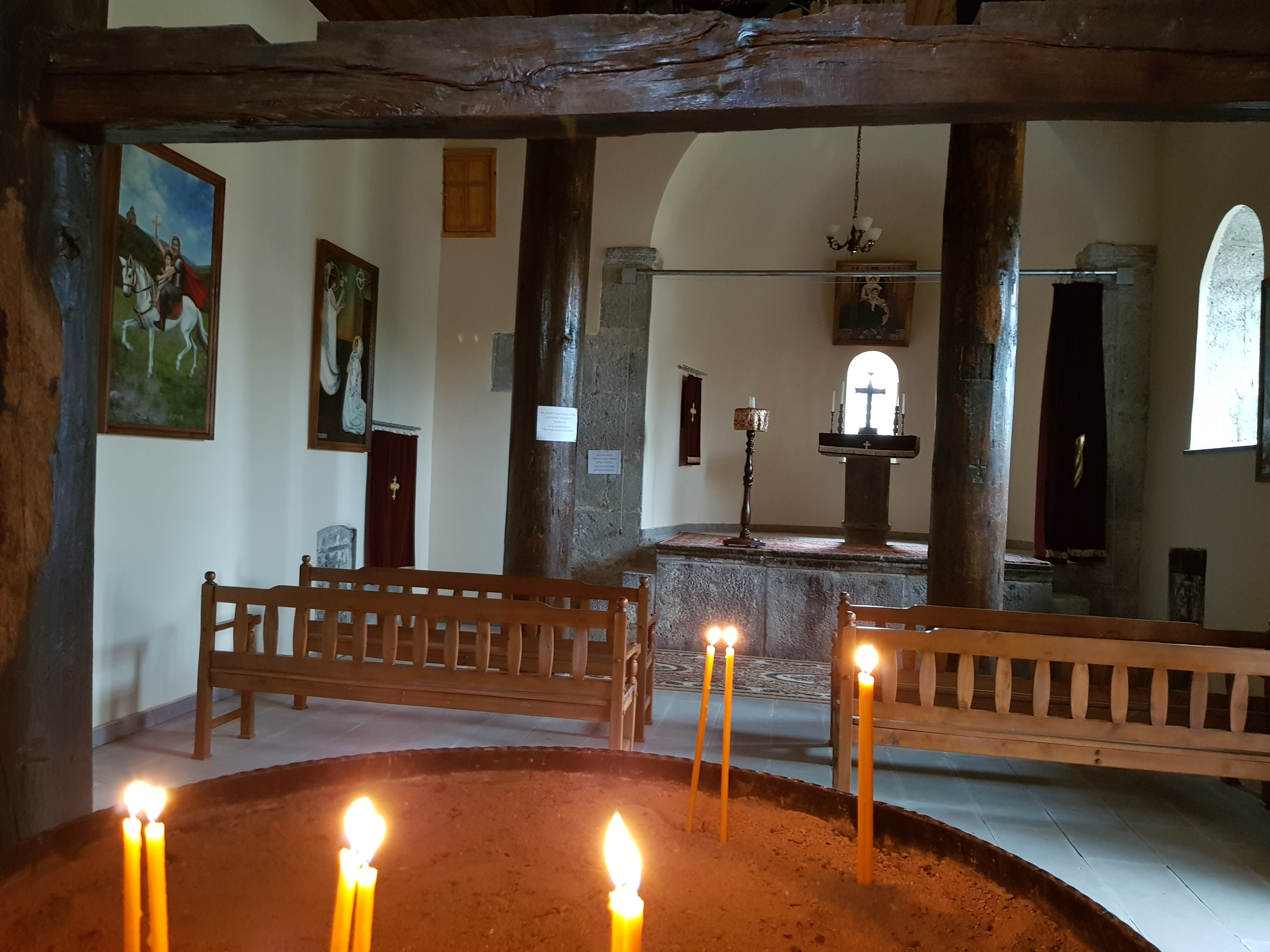

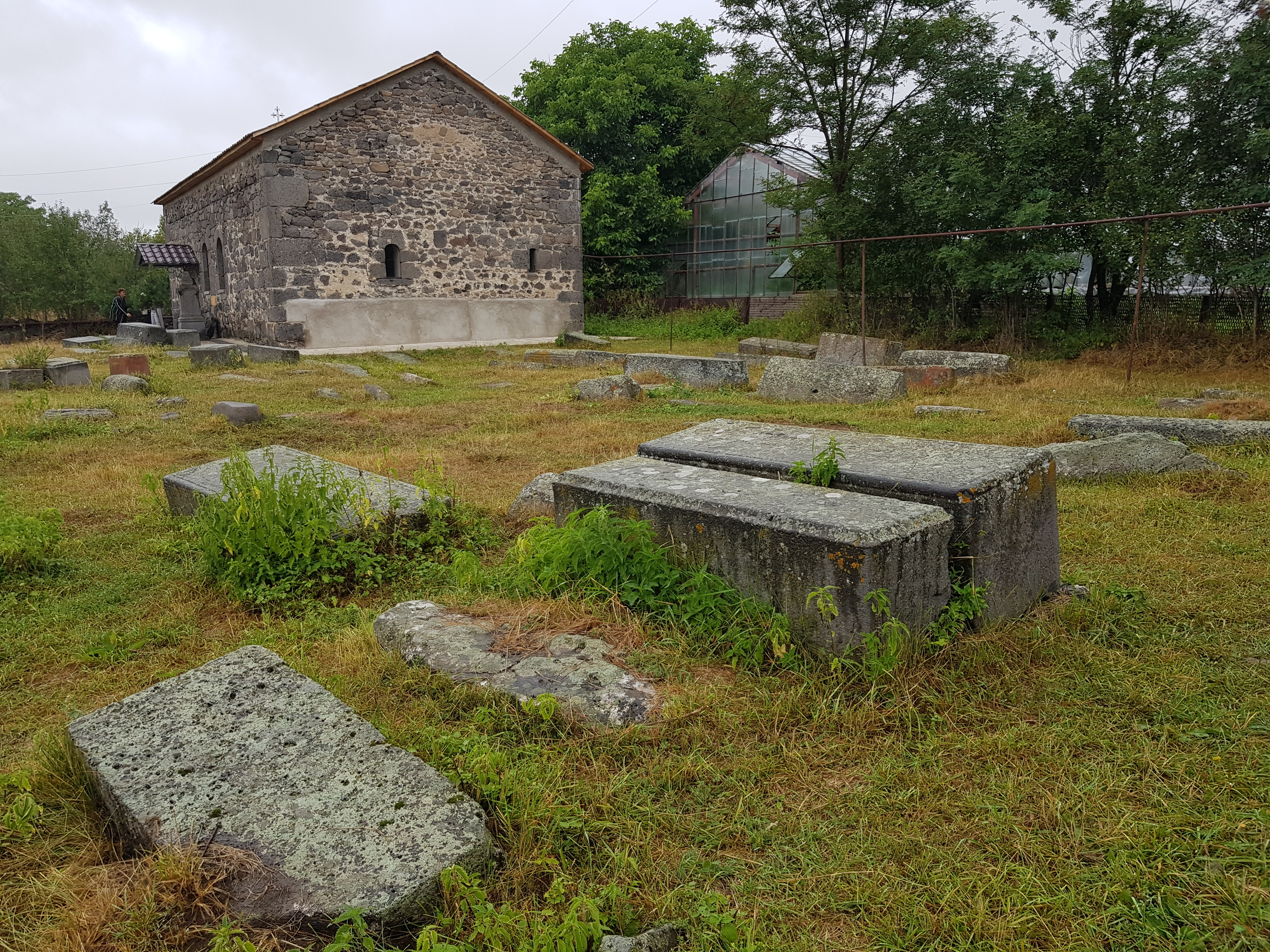

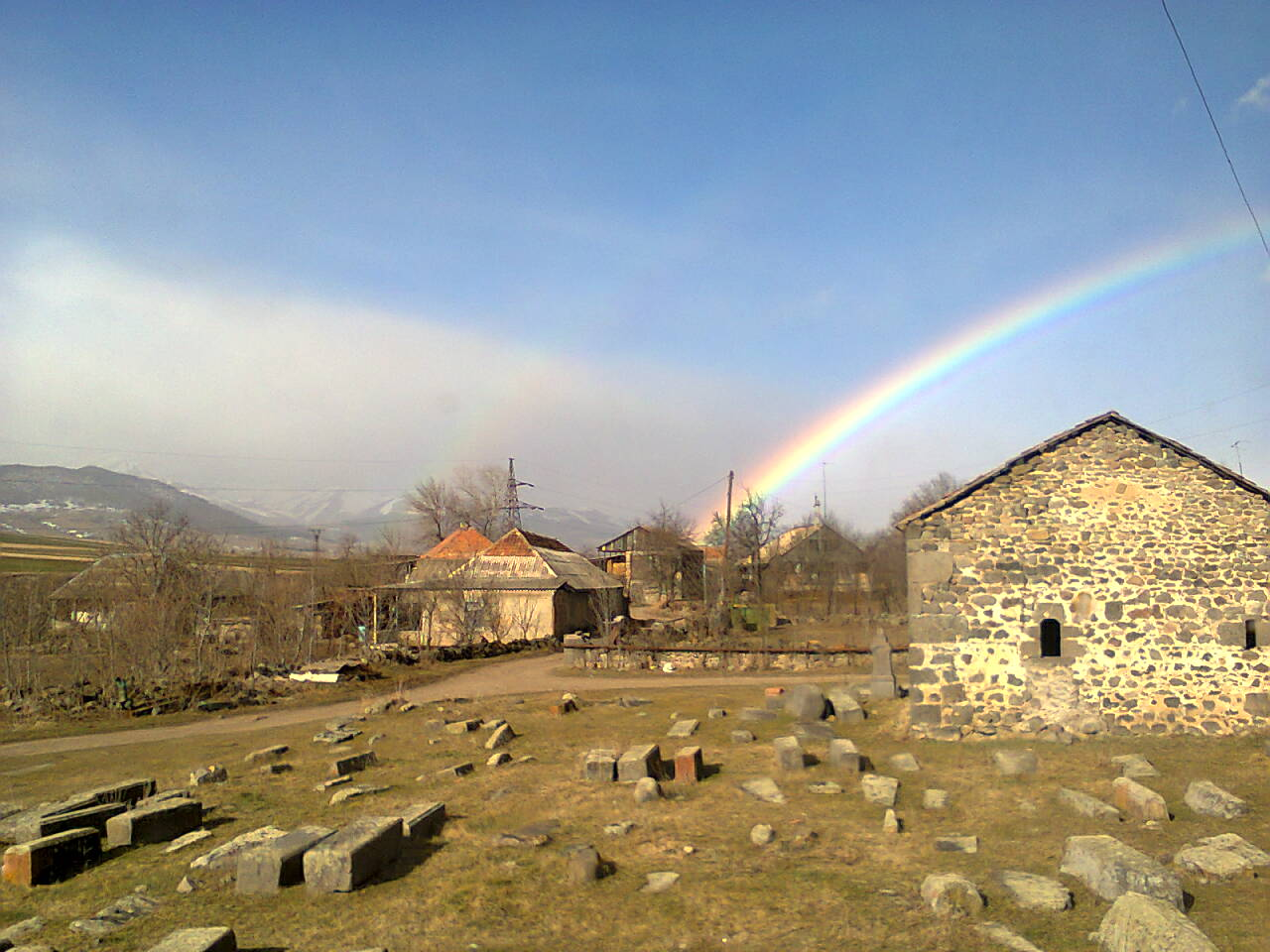

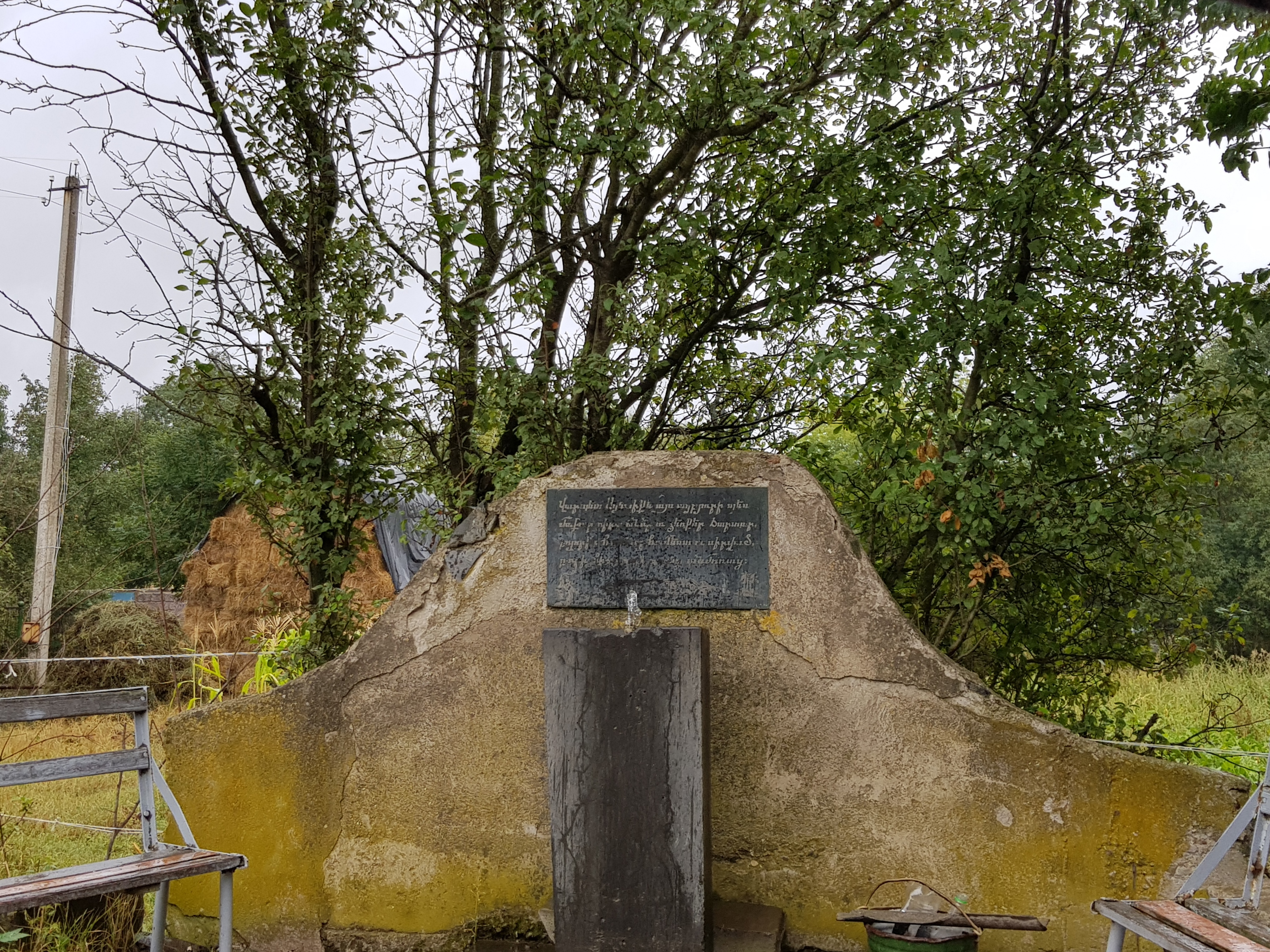

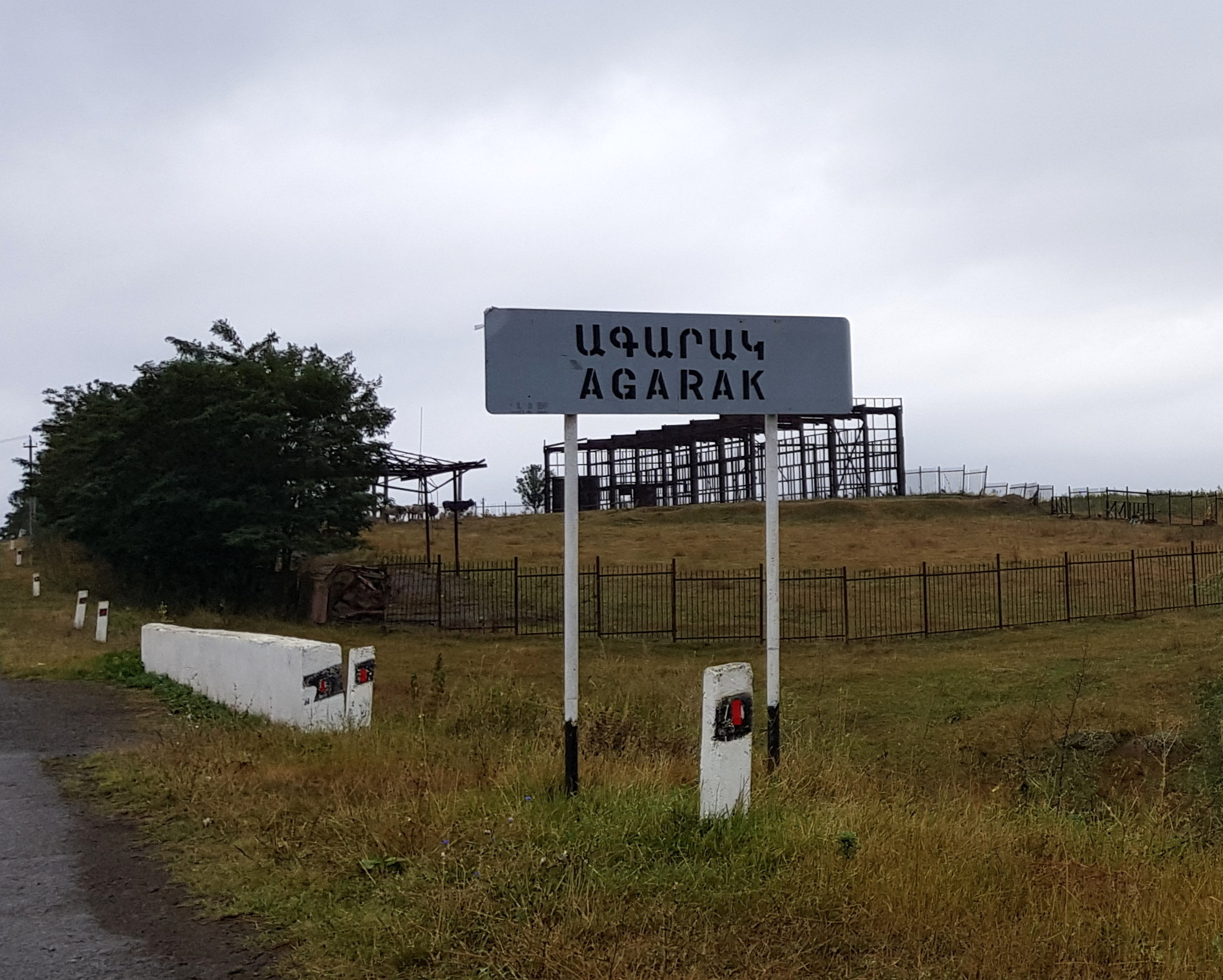
