= Georgian secularism =

Aspect of religious life in Georgia

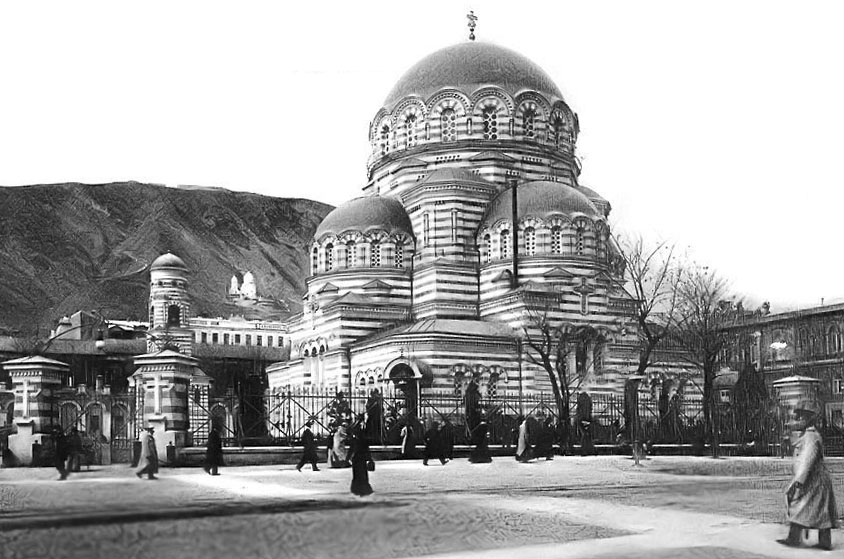
The Tbilisi Alexander Nevsky Orthodox Cathedral was demolished in 1930 to make way for the House of Government of the Georgian SSR.

Georgian secularism (Georgian: ქართული სეკულარიზმი, romanized: kartuli sek'ularizmi) refers to secularism in Georgia being most popular in the 20th century when the country was part of the Soviet Union. In the 21st century, secular and non-religious currents have seen a precipitous decline due to the rising number of people adhering to the Georgian Orthodox Church (GOC). Article 9 of the current Constitution of Georgia provides for complete freedom of belief and religion. It also recognizes the "special role ... in the history of Georgia" of the Georgian Orthodox Church, but stipulates that the GOC shall be independent of the state. A special Concordat (legal agreement) between the Georgian state and the GOC was ratified in 2002, giving the GOC a special legal status and rights not given to other religious groups—including legal immunity for the Georgian Orthodox Patriarch, exemption from military service for GOC clergy, and a consultative role in education and other aspects of the government.

== Sex and childbearing out of wedlock ==
According to a 2015 opinion survey, 37% of the Georgian population thought that childbearing by women outside of wedlock (a sin for most traditional faiths in Georgia) was sometimes or always justified. Georgian public opinion on the matter of pre-marital sex (also a sin for traditional faiths in Georgia), showed different levels of tolerance for women and men: 23% of the public thought that female pre-marital sex was sometimes or always justified, but a higher 55% thought the same about male pre-marital sex.

== Abortion ==
Although the Georgian Orthodox Church views abortion as a "terrible sin", and 69% of Georgians say they can never justify abortion, as of 2005 a Georgian woman was estimated to have an average of three abortions in her lifetime. In recent years, the abortion rates have been somewhat reduced, but due to the increase in the use of contraception among Georgians, which the Church also condemns.

== Homosexuality ==
Georgian population maintains negative views about homosexuality. However according to a 2013 statistically sampled survey of Tbilisi on the subject of anti-gay violence, 87% of residents said that violence is "always unacceptable" and 91% agreed that "everyone should be equal before the law - including the clergy". At the same time, 57% thought that clergy who participated in violence against LGBT persons should not face trial. 40% of respondents disagreed with the notion that church should be intolerant towards sexual minorities, 45% agreed with church intolerance of sexual minorities, while 15% were uncertain. 57% stated that the successful organization of a peaceful demonstration marking the annual IDAHOT would endanger Georgia in some way. According to 2011 social attitude questionnaires, homosexuals remained one of the most disliked groups in society – with most respondents preferring an alcoholic rather than homosexual colleague at work. According to the same questionnaires, an estimated 91.5 percent of Georgians think that homosexuality is "completely unacceptable".

== Challenges to secular governance ==
Article 9 of the current Constitution of Georgia guarantees "complete freedom of belief and religion". While recognizing the "special role ... in the history of Georgia" of the Georgian Orthodox Church (GOC), the Church remains separate from the State. A special Concordat (legal agreement) between the Georgian state and the GOC was ratified in 2002, giving the GOC special legal rights not given to other religious groups—including legal immunity for the Georgian Orthodox Patriarch, exemption from military service for GOC clergy, and a consultative role in education and other aspects of the government.

In December 2015, the head of the GOC Ilia II stated that he would like to have the power to grant pardons to individuals convicted of crimes, which is a power afforded by the Georgian Constitution only to the President. The proposal caused a backlash among Georgian civil society groups, who warned against creeping "theocracy". The Speaker of the Parliament David Usupashvili politely dismissed the Patriarch's idea, saying that issuing pardons and forgiving sins are two separate matters and that legal pardons are a prerogative of the Head of State. Following the backlash, the GOC backtracked on Patriarch's request for pardon powers, saying that it was made after meeting with prison inmates in a "very emotional" atmosphere and that the idea was to be taken as an expression of compassion towards the inmates, and "not as a demand to discuss this proposal at a legislative level".

In 2013, the GOC unsuccessfully lobbied the Georgian government to ban abortions, which it described as a "terrible sin" and "heinous murder", while blaming it for the supposed "grave demographic situation" in the country. Georgia's then Prime Minister Bidzina Ivanishvili brushed off the proposal, stating that solving demographic problems "first and foremost needs economic development".

== See also ==
- Religion in Georgia (country)
- Freedom of religion in Georgia (country)
- Christianity in Georgia (country)
- Islam in Georgia (country)
- Demographics of Georgia (country)
