= Christianity in Georgia (country) =

In 2020, 85.84% of the population in Georgia adhered to Christianity (mainly Georgian Orthodox, also Armenian, Catholic, Protestant, and others, such as Spiritual Christians, Jehovah's Witnesses, and Latter-day Saints), 11% were Muslim, 0.1% were Jewish, 0.04% were Baháʼí and 3% had no religious beliefs. Other religious groups include Yazidis. Orthodox churches serving other non-Georgian ethnic groups, such as Russians and Greeks, are subordinate to the Georgian Orthodox Church.

A Pew Research Center study on religion and education around the world in 2016 found that, among majority-Christian countries, Georgia ranked third in university degree attainment at 57%.

== History ==
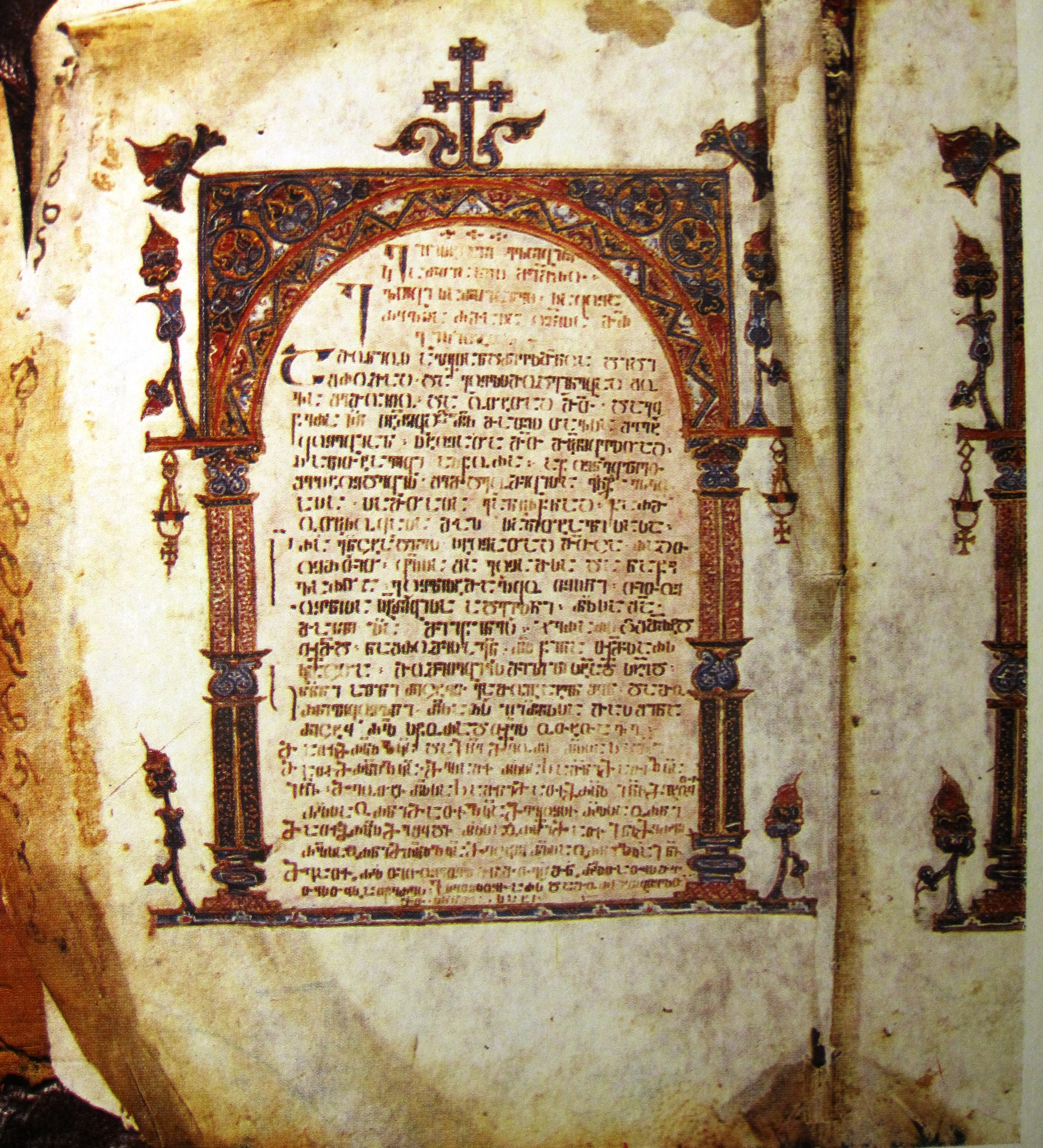
Alaverdi Gospels, an 11th-century Georgian illuminated manuscript Gospel Book

According to Orthodox tradition, Christianity was first preached in Georgia by the Apostles Simon and Andrew in the 1st century. It became the state religion of Kartli (Iberia) in 319. The conversion of Kartli to Christianity is credited to a Greek woman, St. Nino of Cappadocia. The Georgian Orthodox Church, originally part of the Church of Antioch, gained its autocephaly and developed its doctrinal specificity progressively between the 5th and 10th centuries. The Bible was also translated into Georgian in the 5th century, as the Georgian alphabet was developed for that purpose. As was true elsewhere, the Christian church in Georgia was crucial to the development of a written language, and most of the earliest written works were religious texts. Pre-Christian Georgia was religiously diverse, the religions practiced in ancient Georgia include local pagan beliefs, various Hellenistic cults (mainly in Colchis), Mithraism and Zoroastrianism. The adoption of Christianity was to place Georgia permanently on the front line of conflict between the Islamic and Christian worlds. Georgians remained mostly Christian despite repeated invasions by Muslim powers, and long episodes of foreign domination. After Georgia was annexed by the Russian Empire, the Russian Orthodox Church took over the Georgian church in 1811.

The Georgian church regained its autocephaly only when Russian rule ended in 1917. The Soviet regime, which ruled Georgia from 1921, did not consider revitalization of the Georgian church an important goal, however. Soviet rule brought severe purges of the Georgian church hierarchy and frequent repression of Orthodox worship. As elsewhere in the Soviet Union, many churches were destroyed or converted into secular buildings. The history of repression encouraged the incorporation of religious identity into the strong nationalist movement and the quest of Georgians for religious expression outside the official government-controlled church. In the late 1960s and the early 1970s, opposition leaders, especially Zviad Gamsakhurdia, criticized corruption in the church hierarchy. After Ilia II became the patriarch (catholicos) of the Georgian Orthodox Church in the late 1970s, Georgian Orthodoxy experienced a revival. In 1988, Moscow permitted the patriarch to begin consecrating and reopening closed churches, and a large-scale restoration process began. The Georgian Orthodox Church has regained much power and full independence from the state since the restoration of Georgia's independence in 1991.

== Georgian Orthodox Church ==
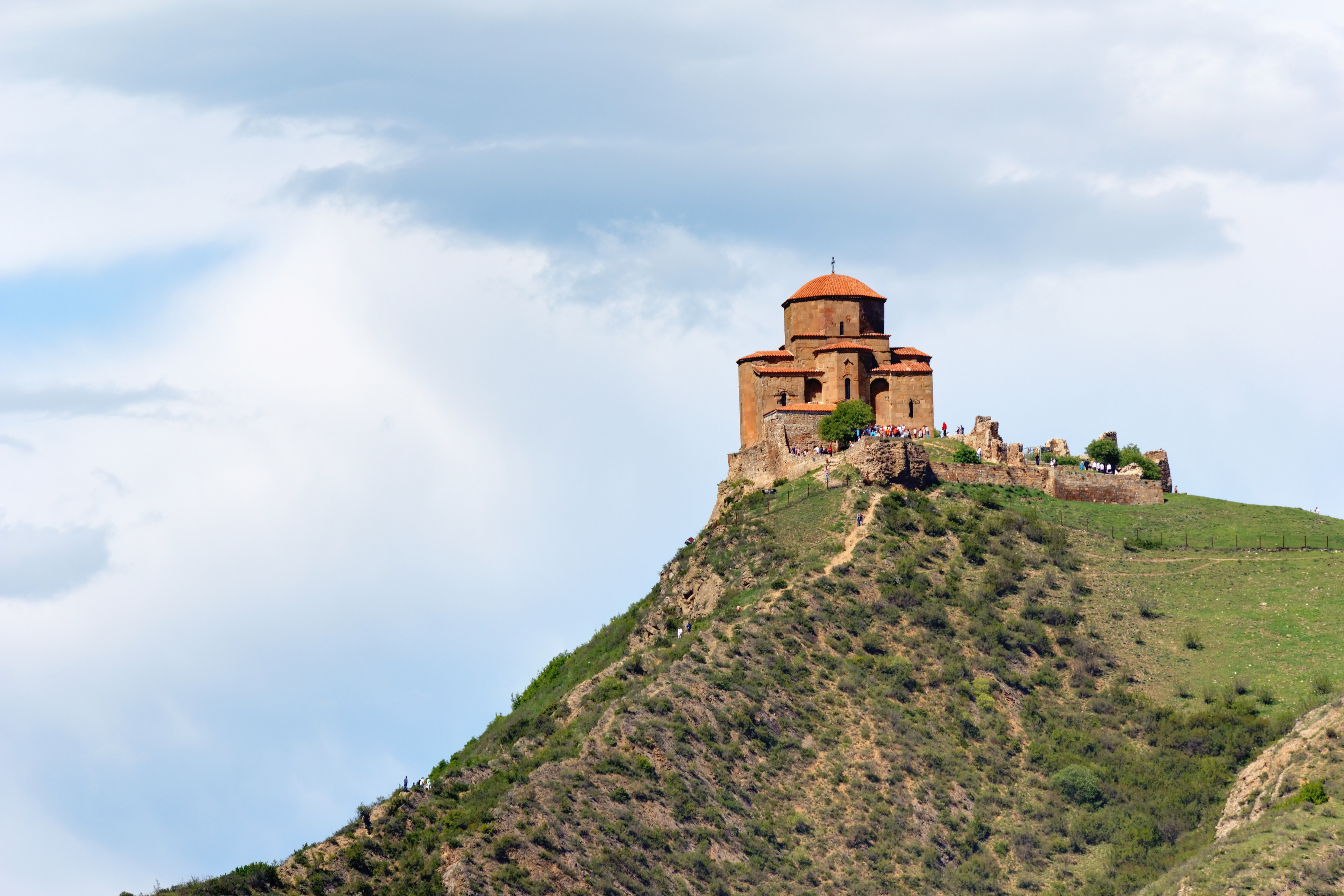
Jvari Monastery, near Mtskheta, one of Georgia's oldest surviving monasteries (6th century)

The Georgian Orthodox Church (full title "Georgian Apostolic Autocephalous Orthodox Church", or in the Georgian language, საქართველოს სამოციქულო მართლმადიდებელი ავტოკეფალური ეკლესია Sakartvelos Samocikulo Martlmadidebeli Avt'ok'epaluri Ek'lesia) is one of the world's oldest Christian Churches, and tradition traces its origins to the mission of Apostle Andrew in the 1st century. It is an autocephalous (self-headed) part of the Eastern Orthodox Church. Georgian Orthodoxy has been a state religion in parts of Georgia since the 4th century, and is the majority religion in that country.

The Constitution of Georgia recognizes the special role of the Georgian Orthodox Church in the country's history but also stipulates the independence of the church from the state. The relations between the State and the Church are regulated by the Constitutional Agreement of 2002.

=== Proposals to declare as state religion in the Republic of Georgia ===
In his inaugural speech in 1991, President Zviad Gamsakhurdia emphasized strengthening the role of religion and proposed declaring Orthodox Christianity the state religion.

During the 2024 Georgian parliamentary election campaign, Bidzina Ivanishvili, honorary chairman of Georgian Dream, proposed recognizing Orthodox Christianity as Georgia’s state religion, presenting it as part of protecting "national values and traditions" and promising to ban "LGBT propaganda". Ivanishvili stated that Christianity, together with homeland and language, is "one of the key foundations of our [Georgian] identity". Prime Minister Irakli Kobakhidze echoed this view at the Conservative Political Action Conference in Hungary, referencing Georgia’s adoption of Christianity in the 4th century and citing Ilia Chavchavadze’s slogan "Language, Homeland, Faith".

In contrast, the Georgian Orthodox Church has expressed skepticism, fearing that such a change could compromise its independence and increase government control. High-ranking clergy members, including Metropolitan Shio Mujiri and Metropolitan Nikoloz Pachuashvili, have raised concerns about the potential implications of this proposal, arguing that it could alter the traditionally independent yet cooperative relationship between the state and the Church, established by the 2002 Concordat.

After the Georgian Orthodox Church rejected the ruling party’s proposal to declare it the state religion, Bidzina Ivanishvili stated on 31 August, during a campaign rally in Ozurgeti, that discussions continued on the constitutional status of the Georgian Orthodox Church. He said a proposed constitutional amendment would define Orthodox Christianity as a "pillar of Georgian statehood" and emphasize its role in Georgia’s history and present.

== Oriental Orthodoxy ==
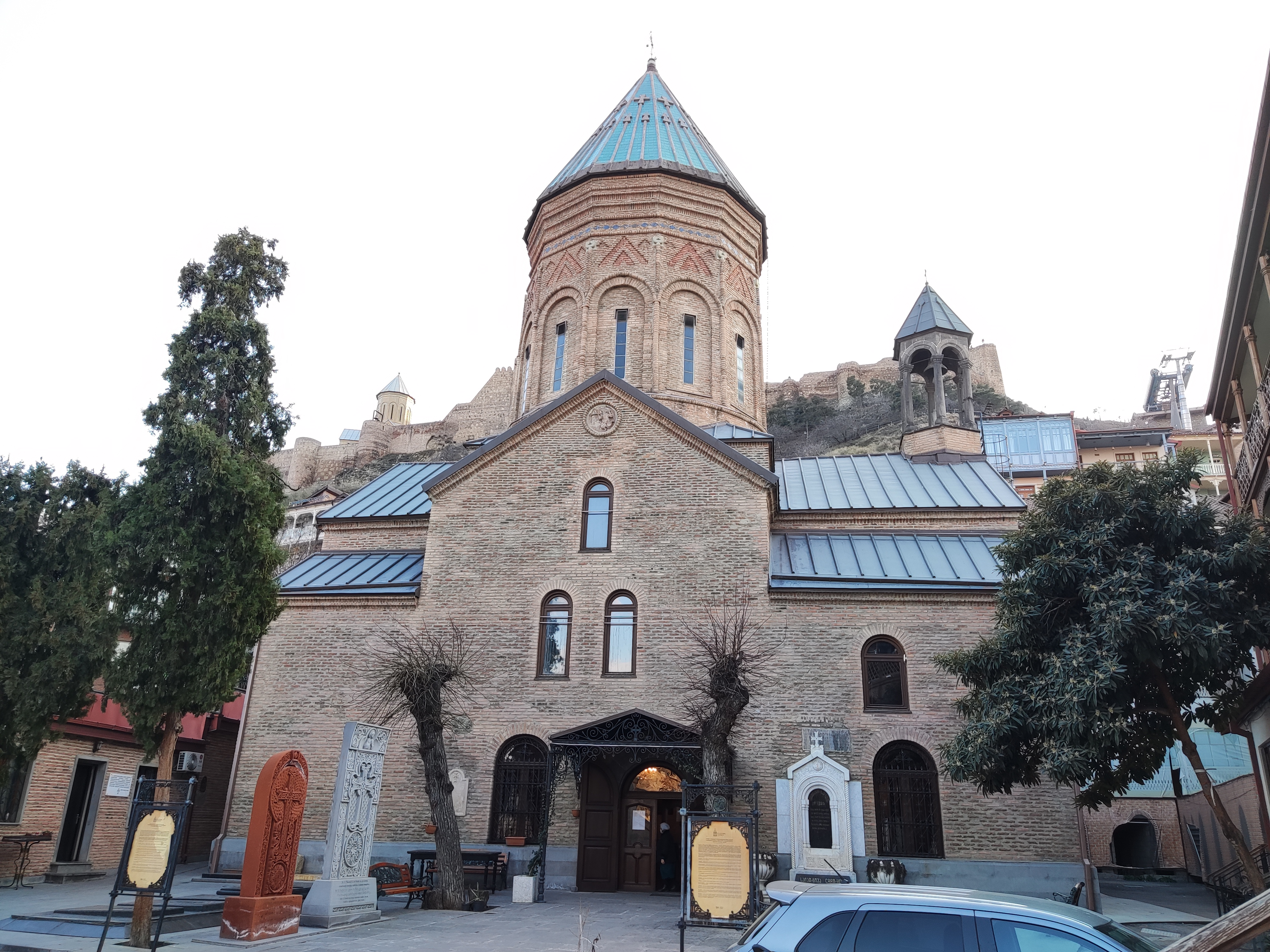
Armenian Cathedral Saint George's Church, Tbilisi

Adherents of Oriental Orthodox Christianity in Georgia are mainly ethnic Armenians. Communities of Armenian Apostolic Church in Georgia are under the ecclesiastical jurisdiction of the Mother See of Holy Etchmiadzin, and its eparchy (diocese), centered in the Saint George's Church, Tbilisi. In 2023, the head of the Armenian Apostolic Diocese in Georgia is the Very Reverend Archimandrite Father Kirakos Davtyan. He took over from bishop Vazgen Mirzakhanyan.

== Catholicism ==
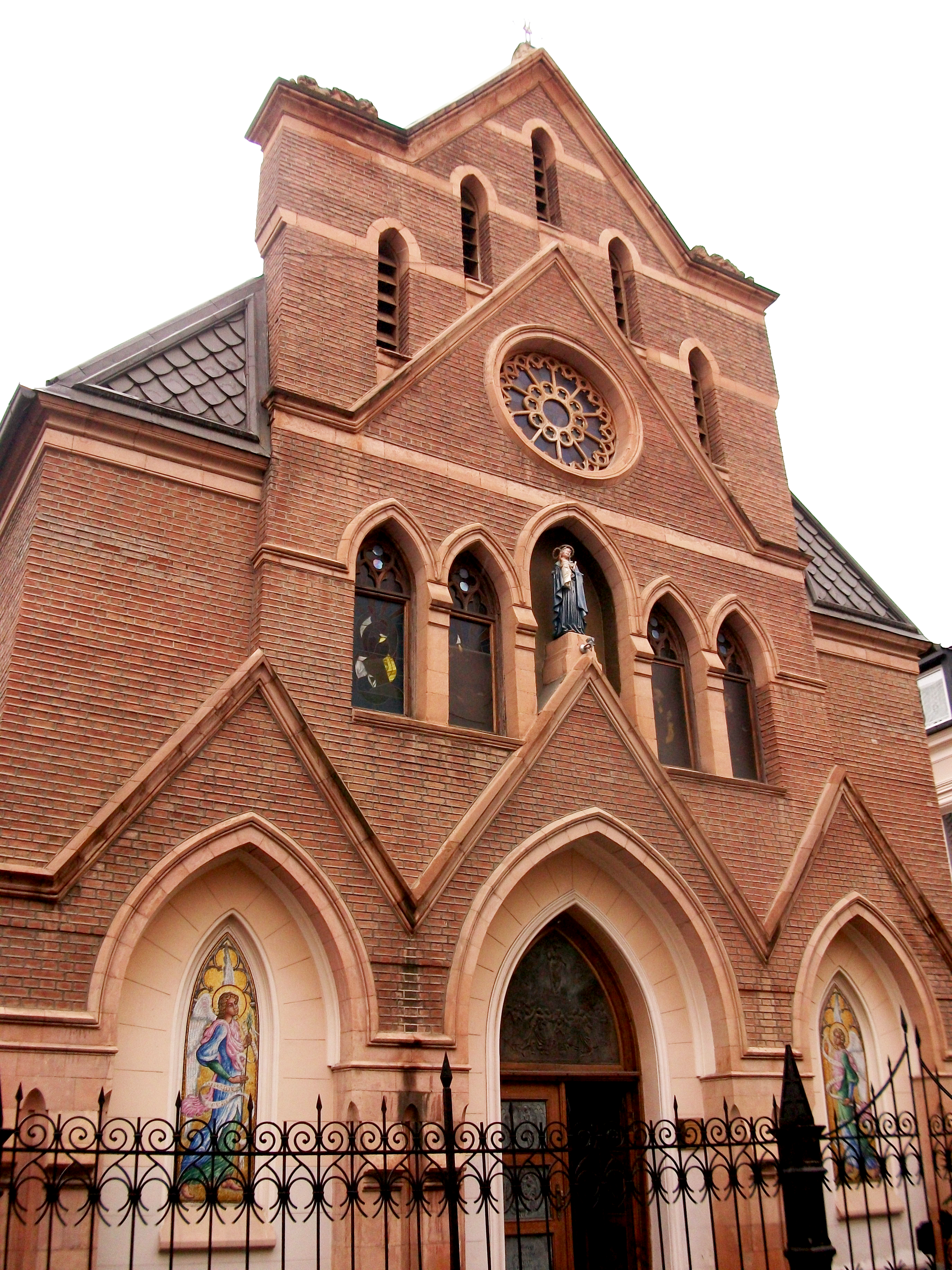
Cathedral of the Assumption of the Virgin, Tbilisi

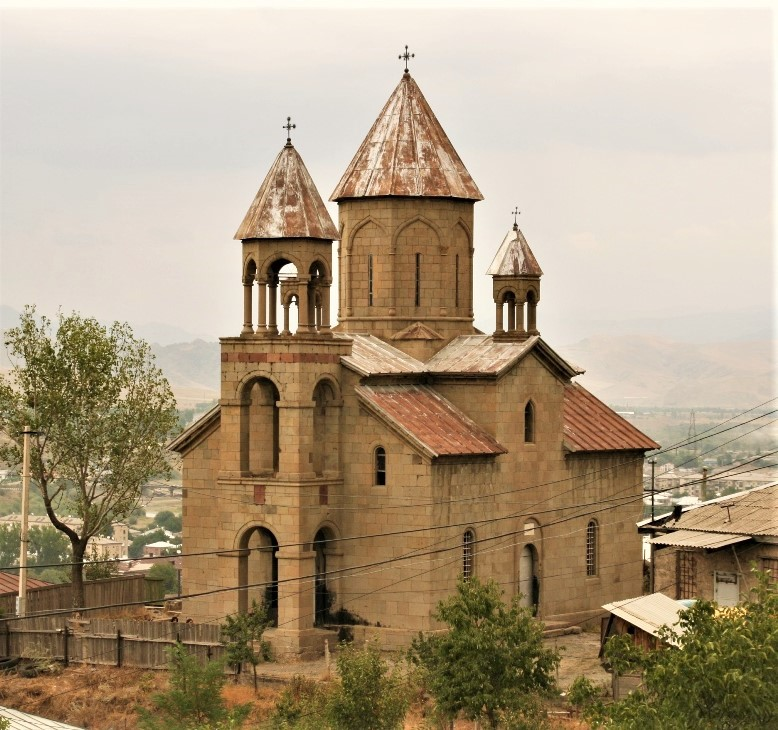
Surb-Nshan Armenian Catholic Church in Akhaltsikhe

The Georgian Catholic Church (or Catholic Church in Georgia) has always, since the East-West Schism, been composed mainly of Latin Church Catholics. Since the 18th century, there has also been a significant number of Armenian Rite Catholics. Georgian Byzantine-Rite Catholics have always been few, and do not constitute an autonomous ("sui iuris") Church, since canon 27 of the Code of Canons of the Eastern Churches defines these Churches as under a hierarchy of their own and recognized as autonomous by the supreme authority of the Church.

A small number, estimated at 500 worldwide, of Byzantine or "Greek" Rite Georgian Catholics do exist. However, "no organized Georgian Greek Catholic Church ever existed", though, outside of Georgia, "a small Georgian Byzantine Catholic parish has long existed in Istanbul. Twin male and female religious orders 'of the Immaculate Conception' were founded there in 1861, but have since died out." This was never established as a recognized particular Church of any level (exarchate, ordinariate etc.), within the communion of Catholic Churches, and accordingly has never appeared in the list of Eastern Catholic Churches published in the Annuario Pontificio.

There are also adherents to the Armenian Catholic Church.

== Protestantism ==
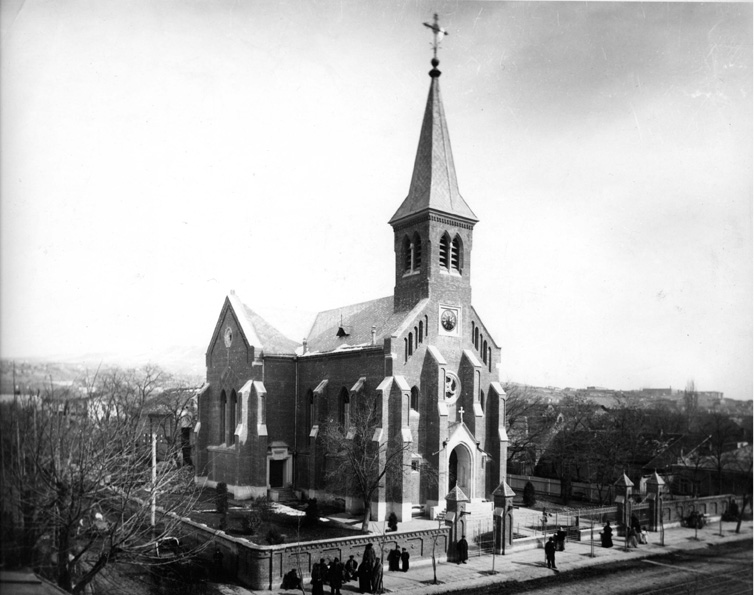
Peter-Paul Lutheran Church in Tbilisi was demolished in 1940

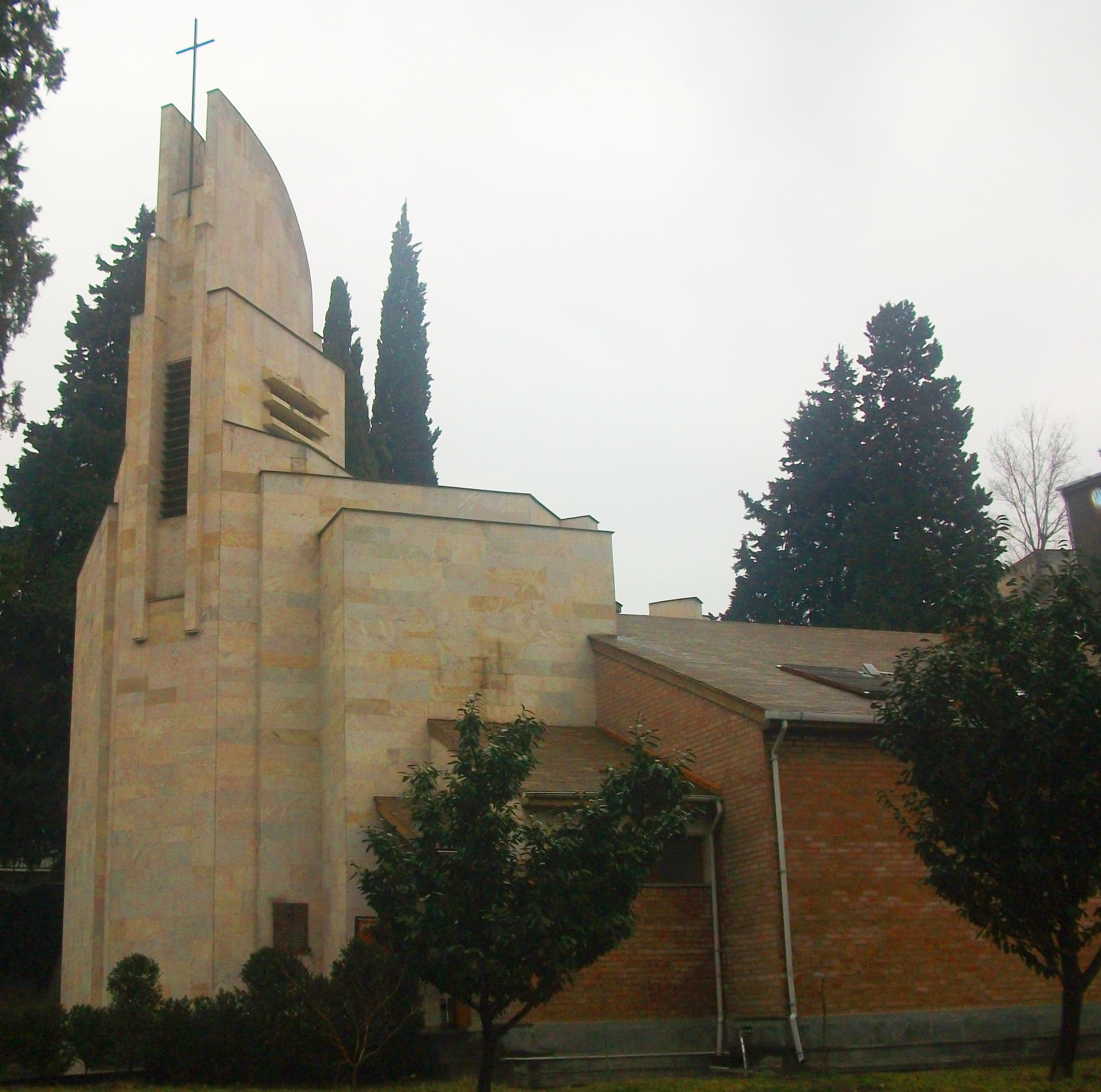
Tbilisi new Lutheran Church

The earliest traceable contact between Georgia and Protestantism took place in the mid-16th century. Shortly after 1574, a copy of the Augsburg Confession was translated into Georgian and sent to Georgia. In 1781, Theodor Grabsch, a German missionary of the Moravian Brethren, met with King Heraclius II of Georgia, who invited the Moravians to settle in Georgia. This planned Protestant settlement never took place, because of the Treaty of Georgievsk. Some German Radical Pietists did settle in Georgia under Russian rule, looking for religious freedom. These were mostly from Swabia and followed the Chiliastic theology of Heinrich Stilling. Many of these Pietist groups were brought into the mainstream Lutheranism by the 1860s. Little effort was made by these Protestants to proselytize native Georgians, since it was believed it would jeopardize their freedoms.

Caucasus Germans migrated to Georgia largely in the first half of the 19th century. Most of them were Lutherans or Baptists. On September 21, 1818, the first German settlement Marienfeld was established near Tbilisi, along the Kakheti highway, now part of Sartichala.

In the 1860s, the first Russian Baptist church was established in Tbilisi by German-origin Martin Klaweit and the local convert Nikita Voronin, who was first Russian baptized in 1867. It converted many Molokans. A. Z. Khutsishvili is considered the first ethnic Georgian to be baptized according to the Baptist rite; his baptism took place in Tbilisi in 1912. Starting in 1919, worship services for Georgians began to be held at the Tbilisi Baptist congregation. Subsequently, Armenian (1926) and Ossetian (1966) Baptist communities were formed in Tbilisi. Georgian Episcopal Baptists, namely the Evangelical Baptist Union of Georgia, have an episcopal polity, with an archbishop as the primate.

Estonians in Abkhazia settled mostly in the late 19th century. By 1887, the first Lutheran church-school had been completed in the village of Estonia which operated as a school and a prayer house. The St. John's Lutheran Church was built in Sukhumi in 1913–15 which attended to the local Estonians, Germans and Latvians.

The first Adventist missionary, Vagram Pampanyan, arrived in Sukhumi in 1904 and began his ministry among the Armenians.

The Holiness movement was represented by the Church of God (Anderson, Indiana). The Church established a missionary society in Riga in 1902 that specialized in preaching among Russian Germans. German-language literature was supplied by the church’s branch in Essen, Germany. Prior to the revolution, its activities extended beyond the Baltic region to the Volga area, southern Ukraine, and the Caucasus, including Georgia. During the 1920s and 30s, the mission’s headquarters was located in Tbilisi. Following the 1941 deportation of Germans to Kazakhstan, the Altai region, and Siberia, charismatic cults spread among the believers.

The first Pentecostal congregation in Georgia emerged around 1929. In modern-day Georgia, this movement represents a dynamically growing group. In 1995, there were 2,500 Pentecostals in the country across 30 congregations. By the beginning of the 21st century, their numbers had risen to 5,000. Their main association is the Georgian Pentecostal Union.

In 1993, during the civil war, the Salvation Army began its ministry and the provision of humanitarian aid to refugees and the needy in Georgia.

Among the Protestant movements new to Georgia are the Holy Trinity Protestant Church (Presbyterian in doctrine), the New Apostolic Church and non-denominational evangelical groups, such as the Georgian Evangelical-Protestant Church and the Georgian Evangelical Church.

A 2015 study estimates that there are some 1,300 Christian believers from a Muslim background in Georgia, most of them belonging to some form of Protestantism.

== Other Christians ==
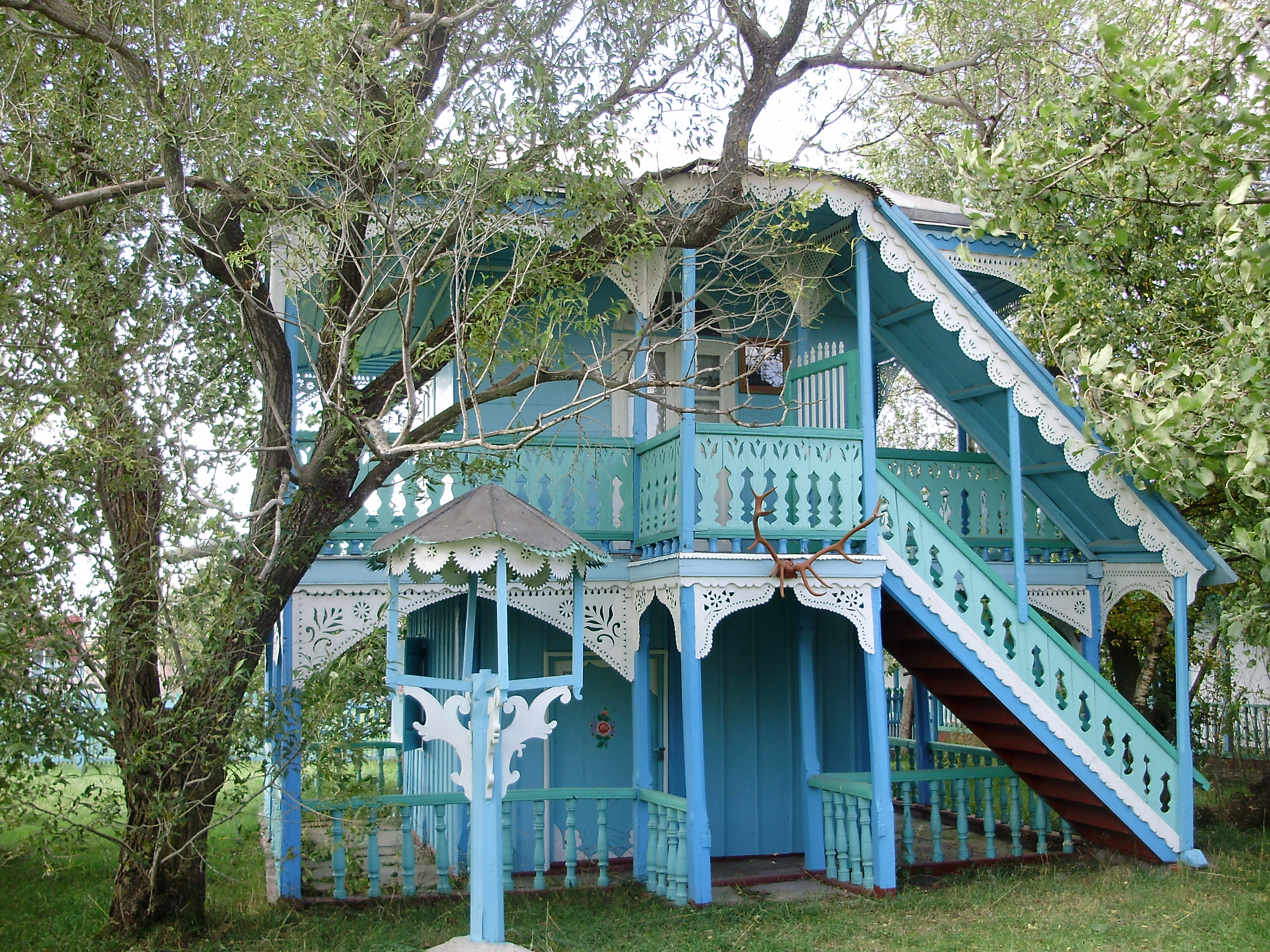
Doukhobor main house in Gorelovka

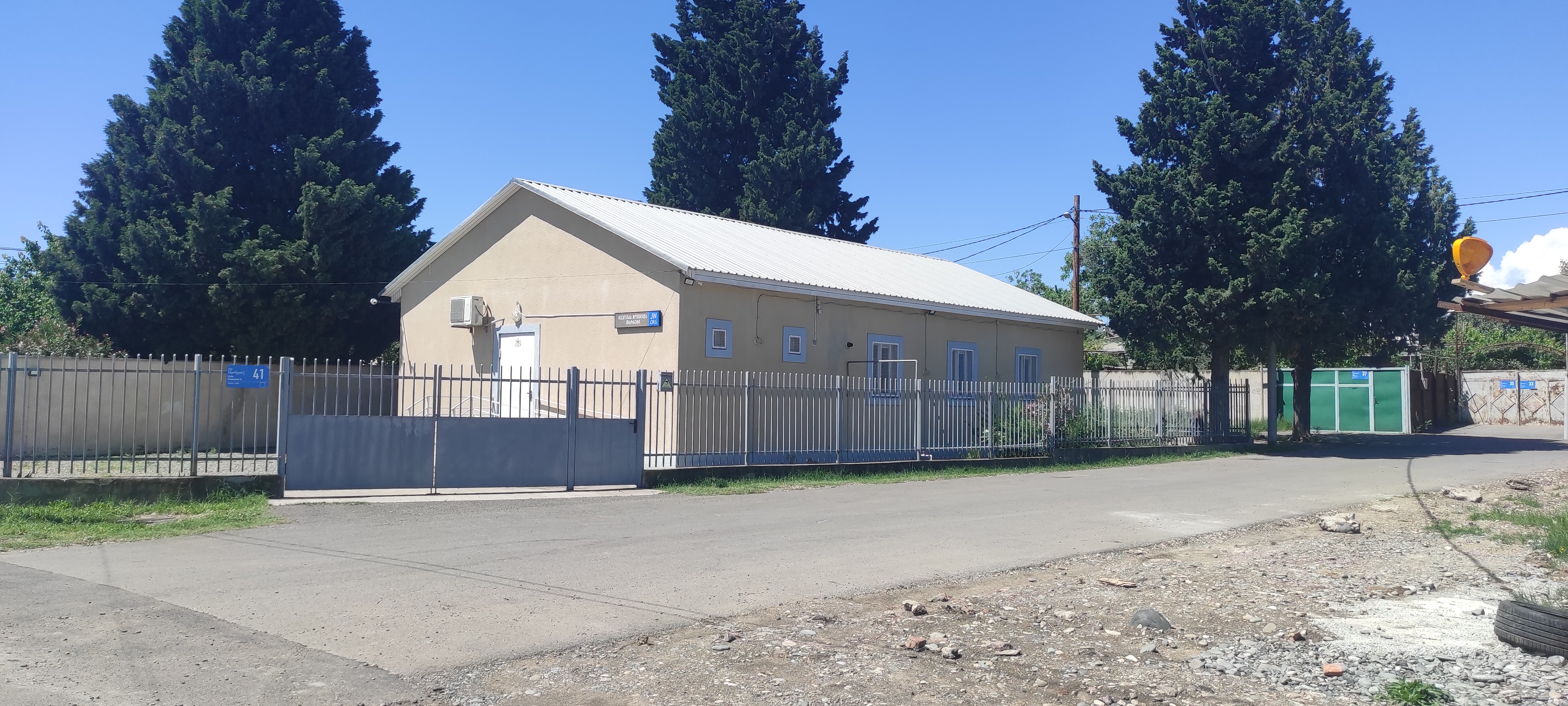
Jehovah's Witnesses Kingdom Hall in Orkhevi, Tbilisi

Among other Christian denominations whose teachings lie outside mainstream Christian traditions, the Spiritual Christians (Doukhobors and Molokans), Jehovah's Witnesses and Latter-day Saints are known in Georgia.

In 1833, by official imperial decree, the Transcaucasian provinces—including Georgia—were opened for settlement by Russian Doukhobors and Molokans. In 1834, Molokans were resettled by government and, between 1841 and 1845, around 5,000 Doukhobors with other dissenters. To this day, the name "Molokansky Bazar" (Molokan Market) is commonly used in Tbilisi to refer to a district of the city. Since the late 1980s, many of them started emigrating to Russia. According to various estimates, in Ninotsminda District, the Doukhobor population fell from around 4,000 in 1979 to between 3,000 and 3,500 in 1989, and around 700 in 2006. In Dmanisi district, it fell from around 700 Doukhobors in 1979 to no more than 50 by the mid-2000s. Most of those who remain in Georgia are older people; the younger generation found it easier to relocate to Russia. The Doukhobor community of Gorelovka in Ninotsminda District is thought to be the best-preserved. Currently, between 5,000 and 15,000 Molokans live in Georgia.

Latter-day Saints or Mormons started missionary work in Georgia in 1999 via Armenian Mission. And in 2005, the Church registered with the government.

== See also ==
- Religion in Georgia (country)
- Freedom of religion in Georgia (country)

== Bibliography ==
- Aleksidze, Nikoloz (2018). "Georgia, Christianity in". In Oliver Nicholson (ed.). The Oxford dictionary of Late Antiquity. Oxford; New York: Oxford University Press. pp. 656–57. ISBN 978-0-19-866277-8.
- Barrett, David B.; Kurian, George T.; Johnson, Todd M., eds. (2001). "Georgia". World Christian Encyclopedia: A Comparative Survey of Churches and Religions in The Modern World. Vol. 1. Oxford; New York: Oxford University Press. ISBN 0-19-510318-1.
- Brackney, William H. (2009). "Georgia". The A to Z of the Baptists. Lanham, Maryland: Scarecrow Press. ISBN 978-0810870710.
- Burgess, Stanley M.; Maas, Eduard M. van der, eds. (2002). "Georgia". The New International Dictionary of Pentecostal and Charismatic Movements (Rev. and exp. ed.). Grand Rapids, Mi: Zondervan. pp. 108–9. ISBN 978-0-310-22481-5.
- Chitanava, Ekaterine; Chabukiani, Nana (2014). "List of Religious Organizations in Georgia". In Beka Mindiashvili (ed.). Assessment of the Needs of Religious Organizations in Georgia (PDF). Tbilisi: Tolerance and Diversity Institute (TDI). pp. 91–101. ISBN 978-9941-0-7054-9. Archived from the original (PDF) on 2015-11-26.
- Grdzelidze, Tamara (2011). "Georgia, Patriarchal Orthodox Church of". In John Anthony McGuckin (ed.). The Encyclopedia of Eastern Orthodox Christianity. John Wiley & Sons. pp. 264–275. ISBN 978-1-4051-8539-4.
- Johnstone, Patrick; Miller, Duane (2015). "Believers in Christ from a Muslim Background: A Global Census". IJRR. 11. Archived from the original on 2021-03-13.
- Kiknadze, Zurab, ed. (2008). Religion in Georgia (PDF). Tbilisi: Public Defender of Georgia.
- Krindatch, Alexei D. (2010). "Georgia". In J. Gordon Melton; Martin Baumann (eds.). Religions of the world: a comprehensive encyclopedia of beliefs and practices (PDF). Vol. 3 (2nd ed.). Santa Barbara, Ca; Denver, Co; Oxford: ABC-Clio. pp. 536–39. ISBN 978-1-59884-203-6.
- Land, Gary (2005). "Georgia". Historical Dictionary of Seventh-Day Adventists. Lanham, Maryland: Scarecrow Press. ISBN 0810853450.
- Mandryk, Jason (2010). "Georgia". Operation World: The Definitive Prayer Guide to Every Nation (7th rev. ed.). Downers Grove, Illinois: InterVarsity Press. ISBN 978-0-8308-5724-1.
- Rapp, Stephen (2007). "Chap. 7. Georgian Christianity". In Ken Parry (ed.). The Blackwell Companion to Eastern Christianity. John Wiley & Sons. pp. 137–155. ISBN 978-1-4443-3361-9.
- Songulashvili, Malkhaz (2015). Evangelical Christian Baptists of Georgia: The History and Transformation of a Free Church Tradition. Baylor University Press.
- Toumanoff, Cyril (1963). "Iberia between Chosroid and Bagratid Rule", in Studies in Christian Caucasian History, Georgetown, pp. 374-377. | Accessible online at "Iberia between Chosroid and Bagratid Rule by Cyril Toumanoff. Eastern Asia Minor, Georgia, Georgian History, Armenia, Armenian History". Archived from the original on 2012-02-08.
