= Human rights in Georgia =

Human rights in Georgia are guaranteed by the country's constitution. The country maintains a human rights ombudsman, the Public Defender of Georgia, who is elected by the parliament to ensure such rights are enforced. However, it has been alleged by Amnesty International, Human Rights Watch, the United States Department of State and the Georgian opposition that these rights are often breached.

In addition, around 20% of the territory of what was the Georgian SSR is in dispute (seen as occupied in the view of the Georgian government in Tbilisi, and by many other countries); there have been frequent allegations of human rights abuses in these territories of Abkhazia and South Ossetia as well.

== Rights of minorities ==
The government of Georgia has taken positive steps towards protecting religious minorities. Attacks against those of different faiths have subsided since the revolution, and a leader of these attacks, Basil Mkalavishvili, was arrested and incarcerated by the authorities. Prime Minister Zurab Jvania was a key supporter of allowing religious organisations recognition from the state, but he faced considerable opposition from his own government: his own president said that the state should do what it can to 'protect Georgia from harmful alien influence.' Despite reforms allowing minority churches to register themselves in 2005, the Georgian Orthodox church has a considerable monopoly in Georgia, whilst minority groups find it hard to even build places of worship.

The 2002 concordat between the G.O.C. and the Georgian government is in place, which grants the Georgian Orthodox Church a privileged status in Georgia, and endows it with authority over all religious matters. It is the only church that has tax-free status, and it is often consulted in government matters. Together with being free of tax, Georgian Orthodox Church also gets some financing from the government as well. The main reason for this is that the church has always been very active in country's cultural development and just like in most Eastern Orthodox countries, the line between culture and religion is blurred.

Georgia has ratified the Framework Convention for the Protection of National Minorities (FCNM) in 2005. The NGO "Tolerance" points out in 2008 that several of the articles of the FCPNM have been exempted from full implementation by the Georgian parliament. Specifically, provisions regarding full expression in the minority's languages in cultural, educational and administrative matters have been compromised, Tolerance claims. For example, the number of Azerbaijani schools has decreased, and cases of appointing headmasters to Azerbaijani schools who do not speak Azerbaijani are cited.

A national strategy for human rights protection was adopted in March 2023.

== Freedom of expression and of the media ==
Freedom of speech, expression, and media is generally a given in Georgia but alas there are times where it is not especially during the 2007 Georgian demonstrations, the riot police attacked the headquarters of Imedi channel, leading it to off the airing of demonstrations.

In 2023, the country improved its position in the World Press Freedom Index from Number 89 to Number 77.

== Prisoner abuse ==
For years, human rights organizations urged President Saakashvili and his government to look into alleged atrocities in Georgian prisons. In 2010 the Human Rights Commission of the Council of Europe reported “The living conditions in prisons and prison camps of Georgia – also known under their euphemistic name as "correctional facilities" - are not conducive of improved outcomes for inmates. Quite the contrary: The system amounts to an offence against international standards for correctional facilities. Requests for help in order to stop torture in their prisons are common. As prisoners are afraid of aggravating the situation, they avoid naming individual torturers.

As of 2010, the availability of medical care in prisons and camps was totally inadequate leading to a very high mortality in Georgian prisons. The human rights of the inmates are simply being ignored." Many other organizations have warned the Saakashvili government, including the United States Department of State in 2008.

Despite the worldwide warnings to the Saakashvili government, the United National Movement Party regarding human rights in Georgian prisons, watchdog organizations reported little or no improvement.

The European Union strongly condemned the abuse of prisoners and urged the Georgian authorities to punish the culprits. EU foreign policy chief Catherine Ashton said she was "appalled by the shocking footage of abuses committed against inmates in Gldani prison. It is of vital importance that these and other incidents are thoroughly and transparently investigated and that those responsible are held to account," she said in a statement.

Rupert Colville, a spokesman for the United Nations human rights office in Geneva, urged Georgia to "promptly, impartially and effectively" investigate all cases of abuse and take steps "to ensure that prisons and detention centers are managed in line with international human rights law and standards."

The questions from human rights organizations worldwide come on the heels of international concerns about free and fair elections in Georgia in 2012.

== 2013 release of political prisoners ==
On January 13, 2013 190 people designated political prisoners by the Parliament of Georgia were released from prison under an amnesty law sponsored by Georgian Dream legislators which passed in 2012 over the veto of out-going President Mikheil Saakashvili.

== Anti-LGBT riots and counter protests ==
Georgians protesting against homophobia in front of parliament following anti-LGBT riots

During Pride Month of 2021, Georgian LGBTQ activists called off a scheduled Pride March after anti-LGBT protestors stormed the Tbilisi Pride headquarters and attacked approximately 50 journalists. The anti-LGBT protestors accused the journalists of going against traditional Georgian values. Tbilisi Pride accused the government and church of emboldening a "huge wave of hate" against the lesbian, gay, bisexual, and transgender (LGBT) community and failing to protect citizens' rights.

Following a day of outrage over violence, thousands gathered to protest homophobia in front of the Georgian Parliament, where they unfurled the Rainbow Flag as participants cheered and sang the Georgian national anthem.

In total, the Georgian government arrested 102 people in relation to the anti-LGBT riots; 68 of these were subsequently released on bail and the rest were left in custody pending trial. On 9 July 2021, Tbilisi City Court denied bail and ordered pre-trial detention of 4 additional members of the violent group. During a preliminary hearing, the judge determined that the actions of these anti-LGBT activists "in addition to being criminal, undermine the stability of the state. They are dark and shameful..."

Despite these episodes of violence and overall negative attitudes, in recent years the Georgian public has softened to some extent towards LGBT persons and there's been a notable increase in the number of people who believe in LGBT rights.

== Georgia proposed bill to remove all LGBT protections ==
A bill proposed in 2024 seeks to remove all protections on LGBT people, outlawing "alternative marriage unions," make being transgender illegal, removing all transgender recognition on identity documents, and banning all LGBT public displays. The bill was passed by the Georgian Parliament on September 4. The European Union, and various human rights organizations have condemned the ruling.

== Historical situation ==
The following chart shows Georgia's ratings since 1991 in the Freedom in the World reports, published annually by Freedom House. A rating of 1 is "free"; 7, "not free".^{1}

Historical ratings

Year	Political Rights	Civil Liberties	Status	President/Head of State^{2}
1991	6	5	Not Free	Zviad Gamsakhurdia
1992	4	5	Partly Free	Zviad Gamsakhurdia
1993	5	5	Partly Free	Eduard Shevardnadze
1994	5	5	Partly Free	Eduard Shevardnadze
1995	4	5	Partly Free	Eduard Shevardnadze
1996	4	4	Partly Free	Eduard Shevardnadze
1997	3	4	Partly Free	Eduard Shevardnadze
1998	3	4	Partly Free	Eduard Shevardnadze
1999	3	4	Partly Free	Eduard Shevardnadze
2000	4	4	Partly Free	Eduard Shevardnadze
2001	4	4	Partly Free	Eduard Shevardnadze
2002	4	4	Partly Free	Eduard Shevardnadze
2003	4	4	Partly Free	Eduard Shevardnadze
2004	3	4	Partly Free	Nino Burjanadze (acting)
2005	3	3	Partly Free	Mikheil Saakashvili
2006	3	3	Partly Free	Mikheil Saakashvili
2007	4	4	Partly Free	Mikheil Saakashvili
2008	4	4	Partly Free	Nino Burjanadze (acting)
2009	4	4	Partly Free	Mikheil Saakashvili
2010	4	3	Partly Free	Mikheil Saakashvili
2011	4	3	Partly Free	Mikheil Saakashvili
2012	3	3	Partly Free	Mikheil Saakashvili
2013	3	3	Partly Free	Mikheil Saakashvili
2014	3	3	Partly Free	Giorgi Margvelashvili
2015	3	3	Partly Free	Giorgi Margvelashvili
2016	3	3	Partly Free	Giorgi Margvelashvili
2017	3	3	Partly Free	Giorgi Margvelashvili
2018	3	3	Partly Free	Giorgi Margvelashvili
2019	3	3	Partly Free	Salome Zurabishvili
2020	4	3	Partly Free	Salome Zurabishvili
2021	4	3	Partly Free	Salome Zurabishvili
2022	4	3	Partly Free	Salome Zurabishvili
2023	4	3	Partly Free	Salome Zurabishvili

== See also ==
- Internet censorship and surveillance in Georgia
- LGBT rights in Georgia (country)
- 2021 attack on Tbilisi Pride
- Sandro Girgvliani Murder Case

== Notes ==
1.The "Year" signifies the year covered, e.g. information for the year marked 2008 is from the report published in 2009.
2.As of January 1.
