= Christianity in Georgia =

Christianity in Georgia may refer to:

- Christianity in Georgia (country)
- Christianity in Georgia (U.S. state)
