= Religion in Georgia =

Religion in Georgia may refer to:

- Religion in Georgia (country)
- Religion in Georgia (U.S. state)
