= The Church of Jesus Christ of Latter-day Saints in the Caucasus =

Latter-day Saints in the Caucasus

The Church of Jesus Christ of Latter-day Saints in Armenia
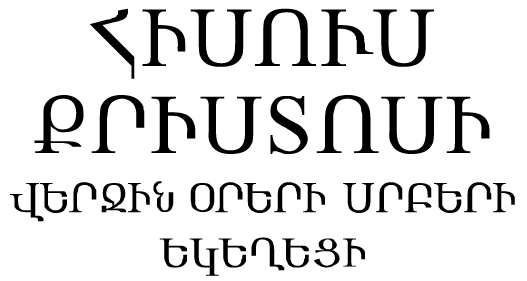
- Logo in Armenian

- Area: Eurasian
- Members: 3,579 (2025)
- Districts: 1
- Branches: 8
- Missions: 1
- FamilySearch Centers: 4

The Church of Jesus Christ of Latter-day Saints in Georgia
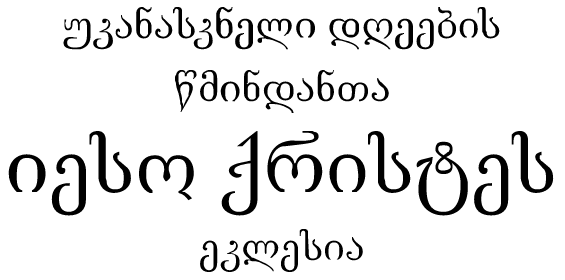
- Logo in Georgian

- Area: Eurasian
- Members: 498 (2025)
- Branches: 3
- FamilySearch Centers: 1

The Church of Jesus Christ of Latter-day Saints in Azerbaijan
- Area: Europe Central
- Branches: 1

The Church of Jesus Christ of Latter-day Saints in the Caucasus refers to the Church of Jesus Christ of Latter-day Saints (LDS Church) and its members in Armenia, Georgia, and Azerbaijan. When the Church was registered in Armenia in 1995, there were approximately 200 members in that country. In Georgia, converts were not allowed to be baptized until 2003. In 2024, there were 3,625 members in 8 congregations in Armenia, and 313 members in 2 congregations in Georgia. It's unclear how many members are in Azerbaijan as the LDS Church doesn't publish these numbers, but there was one branch which appeared to mostly serve expatriate members in 2025.

== History ==
=== Armenia ===
Membership in Armenia
Year	Membership
1995*	200
1999	656
2004	1,795
2009	2,833
2014	3,344
2019	3,579
2024	3,625
2025	3,579
*Membership was published as a rounded number. Source: Wendall J. Ashton; Jim M. Wall, Deseret News, various years, Church Almanac Country Information: Armenia

The first Armenians to join the church were Hagop T. Vartooguian and three members of his family in Constantinople, Turkey. They were baptized January 4, 1885. Missionary work commenced among Armenians outside Armenia in the late nineteenth century particularly in Turkey. As the Ottoman Empire began to decline, violence against Armenians began to increase. In 1909, the Turkish mission closed. The Armenian Latter-day Saints were driven from their homes. In 1921, church leaders encouraged Latter-day Saints in the United States and in Aintab to fast and pray for deliverance these Armenian Latter-day Saints. $115,000 were donated and used to move members south to Aleppo, Syria and some migrated to the United states. The branch formed in Aleppo had 59 members as of 1946. Members of this branch were forced to leave Syria between 1947 and 1950 because of threats against Armenians. In 1950, the Near East mission was closed.

On December 7, 1988, Elder Russell M. Nelson delivered a check for $100,000 to the Soviet Ambassador to provide relief for victims of the 1988 Armenian earthquake. The Church gained converts among American-Armenians by the late 1989. In 1989, the Church announced that it would begin long-term assistance in Armenia, rebuilding and distributing humanitarian aid following the severe earthquake. In June 1991, Elder Dallin H. Oaks dedicated Armenia for missionary work. The first Church-humanitarian missionary couples arrived in November 1991. The Yerevan branch was organized on January 20, 1994. In 1995, the Yerevan district was organized. Seminary and institute programs began in 1995. The Church was registered in Armenia on December 22, 1995. The translation of the Book of Mormon in Eastern Armenian was translated with selections published as early as 1991 and fully completed on December 28, 2000. In 2000, Armenia became part of the Europe East Area. On February 2, 2002 the Yerevan meetinghouse, Armenia's first, was dedicated. The first Church event broadcast via satellite into Armenia was the dedication of the Nauvoo Temple on June 30, 2002. Elder M. Russell Ballard visited the Armenian President Robert Kocharian in Yerevan in August 2006.

=== Georgia ===
Membership in Georgia
Year	Membership
2003	63
2004	81
2009	184
2014	274
2019	246
2024	313
2025	498
Source: Wendall J. Ashton; Jim M. Wall, Deseret News, various years, Church Almanac Country Information: Armenia

Elder Jeffrey R. Holland blessed the land in March 1999. He was accompanied by Elder Charles A. Didier, president of the Europe East Area, and their wives. Later that Georgia was assigned to the Armenia Yerevan Mission shortly thereafter. Nonproselyting, Humanitarian missionaries, Phillip and Betty Reber, arrived in June of that year. They began donating relief supplies to orphanages and taught English.In September, the first Georgians to join the Church were baptized in Armenia due to the Church’s unregistered status.

The first Primary was held Aug. 8, 1999; the first meeting in the Mitskevich Street building was held Sept. 15, 1999; the first priesthood and Relief Society meetings were held Feb. 22, 2000; and the first Young Women meeting was held March 5, 2000. In 2000, Georgia became part of the Europe East Area. Georgia had 14 members by March 2000. On August 9 2002 a branch, Georgia's first, was organized in Tbilisi having 6 humanitarian service missionaries and 50 members.

In August 2005, the Church registered with the government, allowing the first full-time proselytizing missionaries to be assigned with the first arriving March 31, 2006. In 2008, missionaries were withdrawn for a nearly three months period due to conflict with Russia. The seminary and institute programs were introduced in 2008 – the same year the first local member served a full-time mission. The Church translated General Conference talks into Georgian for the first time in October 2011. In 2012, a group was organized in Rustavi. In 2018, the Church reestablished a second branch in Tbilisi named the Temka Branch. The Temka Branch services northern areas of Tbilisi, whereas the Avlabari Branch services southern areas of Tbilisi. Both branches reported directly to the Armenia/Georgia Mission in 2019. In 2018 the translation of the Book of Mormon in Georgian was completed.

=== Azerbaijan ===
The Baku Branch, primarily serving members from outside the country living or staying in Azerbaijan, existed in the early to mid 2010s. In December 2011, the branch consisted of 37 members. Of the 37 members, most were Americans, a Brazilian, a Taiwanese, a Russian, and two Scots. The branch was later dissolved. It was reinstated in 2024 and is now administered by the Istanbul Türkiye District. The first LDS meetinghouse in Azerbaijan was dedicated in Baku in November 2025.

== Congregations ==
LDS Church Locations as of May 2025
Green = District center and meetinghouses*
Purple = meetinghouse
(FHC) = Family History Center
*One icon representing five branches that meet in multiple meetinghouses in Yerevan area

Congregations as of February 2026:

Yerevan Armenia District

- Artashat Branch
- Gyumri Branch
- Vanadzor Branch
- Yerevan Central Branch
- Yerevan Branch
LDS Church Locations as of May 2025
Purple = meetinghouse
(FHC) = Family History Center

Georgia Congregations

As of February 2026, Georgia had 2 congregations meeting in Tbilisi and one in Batumi. A Family History Center is also located in Tbilisi.

- Avlabari Branch
- Batumi Branch
- Temka Branch

The Armenia/Georgia Dispersed Members Unit serves individuals and families not in proximity to a meetinghouse. Congregations not part of a stake are called branches, regardless of size.

Azerbaijan Congregations

- Baku Branch (English)

== Missions ==
In November 1993, Armenia was assigned to the Bulgaria Sofia Mission. In July 1994, responsibility for Armenia shifted to the Russia Moscow Mission. The first two young missionaries, Dallas M. Woolf and Cade L. Rindfleisch, went to Yerevan from the mission in January 1995. Armenia was transferred to the Russia Rostov Mission in January 1997. Finally, the Armenia Yerevan Mission was organized on 1 July 1999, with Robert H. Sangster as president. In 2017, the mission was renamed the Armenia/Georgia Mission.

Challenges that limits LDS Church growth in Armenia include Moral and social challenges. Smoking, drinking and abortion were permissible under the Soviet Union and getting people to live church health standards is a struggle. Many see leaving the Apostolic Church as less Armenian, both individually and by social norms.

Azerbaijan is part of the Europe Central Turkic and Persian-speaking Mission.

== Temples ==
There are no temples in the Caucasus region. Prior to the 2022 Russia Ukraine Conflict, Armenia and Georgia were located within the Kyiv Ukraine Temple District. By 2026, Armenia and Georgia were reassigned to the Bangkok Thailand Temple.

== See also ==
- Religion in Armenia
- Religion in Georgia
