= Freedom of religion in Georgia (country) =

Freedom of religions in Georgia is provided for by the country's constitution, laws, and policies. In practice, the Georgian government generally respects religious freedom; however, the Georgian Orthodox Church enjoys a privileged status in terms of legal and tax matters, involvement in public schools, and property disputes. There have been efforts by private citizens, local government officials, and local Georgian Orthodox Church leaders to harass and persecute members of minority religious groups and interfere with their worship activities; despite calls for tolerance and respect for pluralism by government leaders, the Georgian central government has not been successful in preventing such incidents.

In 2023, the country was scored 2 out of 4 for religious freedom. It was noted that religious minorities have reported discrimination and that members of the clergy have been surveilled by the State Security Service.

== History ==
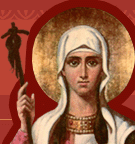
Nino of Cappadocia

Christianity has been the predominant religious influence in the territory comprising present-day Georgia since at least the fourth century A.D., when Nino of Cappadocia, the daughter of a Roman general, is said to have preached in Kartli (present-day eastern and southern Georgia; also known as Iberia) and to have been responsible for the conversion of the king and queen and their family. Christianity in Kartli was initially organized under the jurisdiction of the Church of Antioch, but in the late 5th century, a catholicos (chief bishop) was appointed for the city of Mtskheta, giving the church in the kingdom a degree of local autonomy. A united Georgian kingdom - comprising both Kartli and Colchis (present-day western Georgia) - had taken shape by 1008 under Bagrat III. In 1010, the church in the unified Kingdom of Georgia became autocephalous (self-governing), and its catholicos (Melchizedek I) was elevated to the rank of patriarch and obtained the official title of Catholicos-Patriarch of All Georgia.

Ketevan of Mukhrani

From the 13th through the 18th centuries, Georgia was invaded numerous times by Mongols, Ottomans (Turks), and Safavids (Persians), and the Kingdom of Georgia became fragmented by the end of the 15th century. A notable Christian martyr of this period was Ketevan of Mukhrani, a queen who was tortured to death in 1624 after refusing demands by the Safavid ruler (Abbas I) to renounce Christianity and convert to Islam.

In 1801, the kingdoms of present-day eastern and central Georgia were occupied and annexed by the Russian Empire. The Russian authorities abolished the independent status of the Georgian church and made the region subject to the Russian Orthodox Church; the use of the Georgian language in the liturgy was suppressed, and many church buildings in Georgia were defaced and fell into disrepair. The Georgian Orthodox Church (GOC) reasserted its autocephaly after the overthrow of Tsar Nicholas II in 1917, but the Georgian church was subjected to renewed harassment in the 1920s and 1930s by the newly created Soviet Union, during the rule of the Georgian-born Soviet leader, Joseph Stalin.

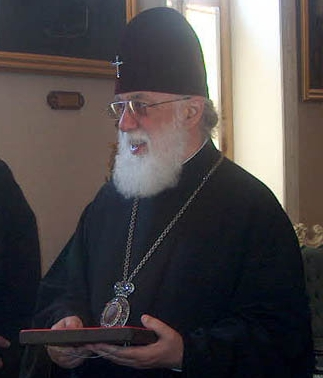
Ilia II

As part of Stalin's efforts to unite the Soviet citizenry against the Nazi threat during World War II, state-sponsored persecution of religion was somewhat eased, and the GOC's independence from the Russian church was once again formally recognized in 1943. Restrictions on religious organizations returned after the end of the war, and the general corruption which plagued the leadership of the Georgian SSR in the early 1970s affected church officials in Georgia. When Ilia II became patriarch of the GOC in 1977, he moved to rejuvenate the church, directing the renovation of derelict churches, as well as construction of new churches. The GOC joined the World Council of Churches (WCC) in 1962, and Ilia II served as president of the WCC between 1979 and 1983.

The GOC's power and prestige in Georgian society increased significantly after Ilia II's installation as patriarch in 1977. In 1990, the Ecumenical Patriarchate of Constantinople (the "first among equals" of the Eastern Orthodox prelates) formally recognized the autocephaly of the GOC and affirmed Ilia II's title of Catholicos-Patriarch of All Georgia.

== Law and policy ==
Article 9 of the current Constitution of Georgia provides for complete freedom of belief and religion. It also recognizes the "special role ... in the history of Georgia" of the Georgian Orthodox Church, but stipulates that the GOC shall be independent of the state. A special Concordat (legal agreement) between the Georgian state and the GOC was ratified in 2002, giving the GOC a special legal status and rights not given to other religious groups - including legal immunity for the Georgian Orthodox Patriarch, exemption from military service for GOC clergy, and a consultative role in education and other aspects of the government.

In 2003, an effort by the Roman Catholic Church to negotiate its own concordat with Georgia failed after the government yielded to pressure from the GOC leadership and public demonstrations said to have been organized by the GOC. In July 2011, the Georgian parliament enacted legislation allowing religious organizations to register as "legal entities of public law", a status closer to that held by the GOC; the leadership of the GOC criticized this proposed law and made an unsuccessful effort to influence the parliament not to adopt it, predicting that "the law will cause negative consequences soon, and the state will be responsible for it". Prior to this 2011 change, religious groups other than the GOC had only been allowed to register as "noncommercial legal entities of private law" - a status (similar to that of a charitable foundation or an NGO) which some churches considered unacceptable and refused to apply for. Public debate over the new law included concerns that the Armenian Apostolic Church (AAC) would use the new, improved status to renew challenges over the ownership of numerous churches claimed by both the GOC and the AAC.

Many churches other than the GOC have experienced difficulty in their attempts to regain property which was confiscated during the Soviet-era crackdown on religion - especially in cases where property disputes involved conflicting claims by the GOC and other religious groups. During 2012, Roman Catholic and Armenian Apostolic church officials suggested that Georgian government officials involved in resolving property disputes were fearful of offending Orthodox constituents if they ruled in favor of other churches and against the GOC. Cases were also reported in 2012 of Jehovah's Witnesses being denied alternatives to military service (which they had refused to perform on grounds of conscience); of Seventh-day Adventists being refused alternative dates for school examinations scheduled for Saturday; and Muslims and Jews being denied worship facilities or faith-specific dietary accommodations in prisons.

In 2012, Georgian president Mikheil Saakashvili made public statements recognizing the religious contributions of Roman Catholics, Armenian Apostolics, and Azeri Muslims, saying that he was "proud that we are making a unified state where representatives of all cultures, confessions, and ethnicity feel themselves as equal children of the country". Later in the same year, newly elected prime minister Bidzina Ivanishvili met with Jewish groups, celebrating Shabbat and Hanukkah and stating that he was "committed to making Georgia a place where all Georgians, regardless of their faith, are treated equally and with respect".

During the 2024 Georgian parliamentary election the Georgian Dream announced the prospect of a constitutional amendment designating Orthodox Christianity as the state religion. The ruling party branded this initiative as part of their commitment to uphold "national values and traditions," in line with their campaign promises to ban "LGBT propaganda" and reinforce the role of the Church.

In contrast, the Georgian Orthodox Church has expressed skepticism, fearing that such a change could compromise its independence and increase government control. High-ranking clergy members, including Metropolitan Shio Mujiri and Metropolitan Nikoloz Pachuashvili, have raised concerns about the potential implications of this proposal, arguing that it could alter the traditionally independent yet cooperative relationship between the state and the Church established by the 2002 Concordat.

=== Abkhazia ===
The disputed region of Abkhazia is claimed by Georgia as part of its sovereign territory, but it has been entirely outside Georgia's effective control (and ruled instead by a de facto separatist government) since the early 1990s. Following the 2008 Russia-Georgia war, Abkhazia gained formal recognition as an independent state by Russia and a small number of other nations, though the United Nations (UN) and most of the international community still consider it to be part of Georgia. As a consequence of a 1992-1993 war with Georgia, most ethnic Georgians originally living in Abkhazia were either expelled or killed.

Approximately 60% of Abkhazians identify themselves as Christians - most being either Eastern Orthodox or Armenian Apostolic adherents. The GOC has lost effective control over church operations in Abkhazia, and the organizational vacuum has been filled by a new Abkhazian Orthodox Church, which is recognized by the government of Abkhazia, but not by the GOC or the Russian Orthodox Church, which still consider the church in Abkhazia to be under the jurisdiction of the GOC. The GOC is not able to travel to Abkhazia and few GOC worshippers in Abkhazia are able to travel to Tbilisi as only a few ethnic Georgians had passports issued by the Abkhazia authorities.

Roman Catholics, Baptists, and Lutherans have been allowed to operate in Abkhazia. Jehovah's Witnesses are officially banned, although they are allowed to assemble in Akhalgori.

=== Samatchablo (Tskhinvali Region) ===
The disputed region of Tskhinvali is also claimed by Georgia, but much of South Ossetia came under the de facto control of a separatist government following a 1991-1992 war. Georgia's 2008 war with Russia left the territory completely under separatist control, and South Ossetia has subsequently been recognized as an independent state by Russia and a small number of other nations, but not by the UN or most of the international community.

Both Orthodox churches formally recognise the Orthodox churches in South Ossetia as belonging to the GOC; GOC representatives have reported that de facto authorities in South Ossetia continued to pressure the local GOC to merge with the ROC. Jehovah's Witnesses in the area are not officially recognized.

== Societal attitudes ==
The overwhelming majority of the modern Georgian population identifies with the Georgian Orthodox Church (GOC) - between 83 and 86 percent of the population, according to various polls. Muslims represent 9-10% of the population, and adherents of the Armenian Apostolic Church comprise about 4%. There are also much smaller numbers of followers of various other religions, including Roman Catholics, Jews, and numerous non-traditional recent arrivals to Georgia (such as Baptists, Pentecostals, Jehovah's Witnesses, Seventh-day Adventists, and Latter-day Saints). Religious affiliation is strongly correlated with ethnicity, with most ethnic Georgians affiliating with the GOC. In 2012, about 45% of the Georgian population attended some sort of religious services at least once a month.

Minority religious groups are viewed by some Georgians as a threat to Georgian national identity, cultural values, and the GOC. Between 1999 and 2002, followers of a defrocked former GOC priest, Basil Mkalavishvili, attacked congregations of Jehovah's Witnesses and Baptists in Tbilisi. In 2011, eight members of Orthodox fundamentalist groups were sentenced to prison for breaking into a television station and assaulting participants on a talk show on religious freedom; however, after the October 2012 parliamentary election and the transition to a new government, these individuals were reclassified as "prisoners of conscience" and were freed as part of a general amnesty. Across the country, there were 98 instances of religiously intolerant statements in the press in 2022 (mostly anti-Muslim), compared with 117 in 2021.

During 2012, some congregations of Muslims and Jehovah's Witnesses reported physical confrontations and verbal threats, some involving local GOC priests and their parishioners. In 2021, Jehovah’s Witnesses reported six criminal incidents against the group; in 2022, there were nine reported incidents.

In September 2013, Patriarch Ilia II - delivering his Sunday sermon in the Holy Trinity Cathedral of Tbilisi - said that although "rights are good and are needed and rights should be protected", it was less often recognized that "the majority too has to be protected", and that "often the majority is more oppressed than the minority".

=== Muslims ===
Ethnic Azeris, most of whom are Muslim, form the majority of the population in the southeastern Georgian region of Kvemo Kartli. Other Muslim groups include ethnic Georgians in Adjara (an autonomous region in the southwestern part of the country) and Chechens in the northeast.

In November 2012, Muslims in a western Georgian community were prevented from gathering for prayer by Orthodox priests and townspeople; the local priest said that the local residents "would not allow any minarets and mass prayers in this village", and the police did not intervene. In July 2013, Muslims in an eastern Georgian village had their services disrupted in spite of efforts at conciliation by government officials and a personal plea for tolerance by Patriarch Ilia II, head of the GOC, who denounced oppression of Muslims and said he himself had grown up in a household that included observant Muslims.

In August 2013, government authorities disassembled and removed a 24-metre (79-foot) minaret from a mosque in Chela (a village in southwestern Georgia) after objections were raised by members of the surrounding community. The minaret's confiscation was reportedly prompted by claims that the metal from which it was formed may not have been properly declared for customs purposes when it was imported from Turkey. Amidst protests against the action by Muslim residents of the village, police reportedly beat six residents and arrested eleven. Unlike in some other communities with a mixture of Muslim and Orthodox residents, there had not been any protests against the mosque or its minaret by residents of Chela. The minaret was eventually returned to the mosque and was reinstalled in late November 2013.

== Other controversies ==
=== Best Georgians television program ===
A controversy arose in January 2009 over a Georgian Public Broadcaster (GPB) television program, Sakartvelos Didi Ateuli (Georgian: საქართველოს დიდი ათეული; "Georgia's Great Ten", or "Best Georgians") - a show which invited viewers to pick Georgia's top historical personages through polling by telephone, text messaging, and a special web site (www.bestgeorgians.ge). The list of contenders included over a dozen individuals who are recognized as saints by the Georgian Orthodox Church (including, for example, King David the Builder); officials of the church publicly objected to the inclusion of both religious and secular figures in the competition, as well as to the idea of having viewers put saints in rank order.

On 16 January 2009, the regular airing of Didi Ateuli was replaced by a debate between church representatives, their supporters, and opponents of the church's position. During the show, the chairman of the GPB board of trustees, Levan Gakheladze, announced that a divided board had voted to suspend the show pending further consideration. Comments from trustees and critics revealed deep divisions between supporters and opponents of the church's stance - some decrying church interference, others saying they could not ignore insistences from church leaders, and one board member stating that "The opinion of the Patriarch [Ilia II] is more important for me than the law."

On 22 January, GPB announced that Didi Ateuli would proceed, with both saints and secular figures retained in the competition, but that the final list of ten would not be ranked but would be announced in alphabetical order. A statement released by the GOC attempted to downplay the controversy as "artificial", suggesting that "someone wants to portray the Church as a censor" in order to dissuade church officials from speaking out on future issues.

=== "Father Hemorrhoids" videos ===
In the autumn of 2009 there were street demonstrations and other signs of public anger after it was discovered that Tea Tutberidze, a former activist in the Kmara protest group at the time of the Rose Revolution and now a leading figure in the conservative Liberty Institute, had been distributing videos that insulted Patriarch Ilia II. Tutberidze did not claim to have made the videos—they were published by an unknown "Father Hemorrhoids" (Georgian: მამა ბუასილი, mama buasili; a rude pun on the common Georgian man's name Basili) - but she had promoted them via her Facebook page. The Ministry of Internal Affairs arrested two people over the videos but later admitted there was no crime. Tutberidze remained defiant and later accused the church of co-operation with the KGB under Soviet rule.

=== Violence at Kavkasia TV studio ===
On 7 May 2010, a live televised talk show on Kavkasia TV, involving leaders of hardline Orthodox Christian groups and their opponents, degenerated into name-calling and eventually broke down entirely after the participants decided to quit the debate and left the studio. After an unusually long commercial break, the host of the program announced that a fistfight between the opposing sides had occurred outside the studio. Some minutes later, several members of one of the hardline Orthodox groups - including priests - entered the studio and accused the program's host of having staged a provocation. Police arrived and arrested several people. One opposition politician in the studio suggested that the hardline groups "would not have dared to do things like this without having support of the authorities"; a member of one of the Orthodox groups, on the other hand, accused the Liberty Institute (a government-aligned think tank) of "promoting anti-religious ideology". The people arrested in this incident were later released from prison following a resolution by the Georgian parliament in January 2013 which declared them and many others to be political prisoners.

=== Anti-homosexuality violence ===
On 17 May 2013, a rally marking the International Day Against Homophobia, Biphobia and Transphobia was held in downtown Tbilisi. Despite the presence of over 2,000 police officers, participants in the event were attacked by thousands of counter-demonstrators - including GOC clergy - who broke through the police lines. Priests and members of the GOC, communicating via social networks, had protested the planned event and had announced plans to prevent it from taking place.

Debate over the incident extended beyond LGBT rights and grew into a broader discussion about the role of the GOC in Georgian society. On 24 May, several hundred demonstrators gathered in a downtown Tbilisi park with banners reading "No to Theocracy" and "No to Darkness"; a parallel counter-demonstration carried a banner calling for a ban on "propaganda of sexual wrongness and indecency".

Two priests of the GOC were amongst those arrested in connection with the attack on the 17 May rally. Charges against one of these were later dropped after the Tbilisi city court ruled that there was not enough evidence to prove his guilt.

Patriarch Ilia II, who had released a statement on 16 May calling on authorities to cancel the rally, criticized the gay rights movement and said homosexuality was a sin and "should not be propagandized". However, after the events of 17 May, the patriarch sought to distance himself and the GOC from the violence, said that priests opposing the demonstration had behaved "impolitely", and appealed for calm. The chairman of the Georgian parliament, Davit Usupashvili, suggested that Ilia II's call for authorities to ban the rally had served as encouragement to the counter-demonstrators.

Georgian president Mikheil Saakashvili and prime minister Bidzina Ivanishvili denounced the violence against the anti-homophobia rally. Ivanishvili said that the incident was neither Georgian nor Christian in character, that the authorities would bring to justice those "who were calling for violence and those resorting to violence", and that any member of the clergy who violated the law should be "held responsible before the law like any other citizen". Saakashvili said the 17 May violence showed that the Georgian state was facing a "threat of theocracy", but that Georgia would never have a "broad problem of religious fundamentalism" and that "not a single institution, including the Orthodox Church, is interested in violence".

== See also ==
- Religion in Georgia (country)
- Secularism and Irreligion in Georgia
