= The Church of Jesus Christ of Latter-day Saints in Turkey =

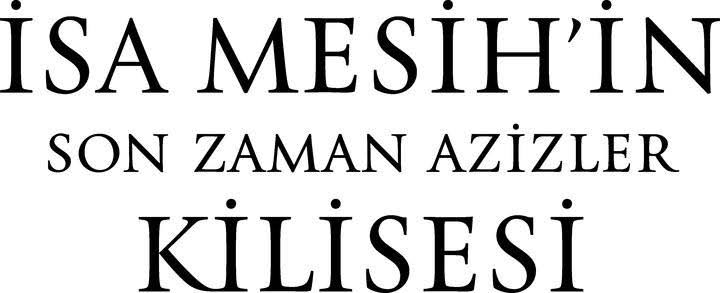
- (Logo in Turkish)

- Area: Europe Central
- Members: 808 (2025)
- Districts: 1
- Branches: 7

The Church of Jesus Christ of Latter-day Saints in Turkey refers to the Church of Jesus Christ of Latter-day Saints (LDS Church) and its members in Turkey. As of December 31, 2025, the Church has 808 members and 7 branches in Turkey.

== History ==
Membership in Turkey
Year	Membership
2003	151
2009	209
2014	397
2019	512
2024	698
2025	808
Source: Wendall J. Ashton; Jim M. Wall, Deseret News, various years, Church Almanac Country Information: Turkey and "Statistics and Church Facts | Total Church Membership". newsroom.churchofjesuschrist.org.

Latter-day saint British soldiers met in Turkey in May 1854. The first Latter-day Saint sent by the church was Jacob Spori who arrived in Istanbul on December 31, 1884. Shortly after, on January 4, 1885, Hadop and Philimae Vartooguain and their two children, Sisak and Armais, were baptized. The first group meeting was held on January 18, 1885.

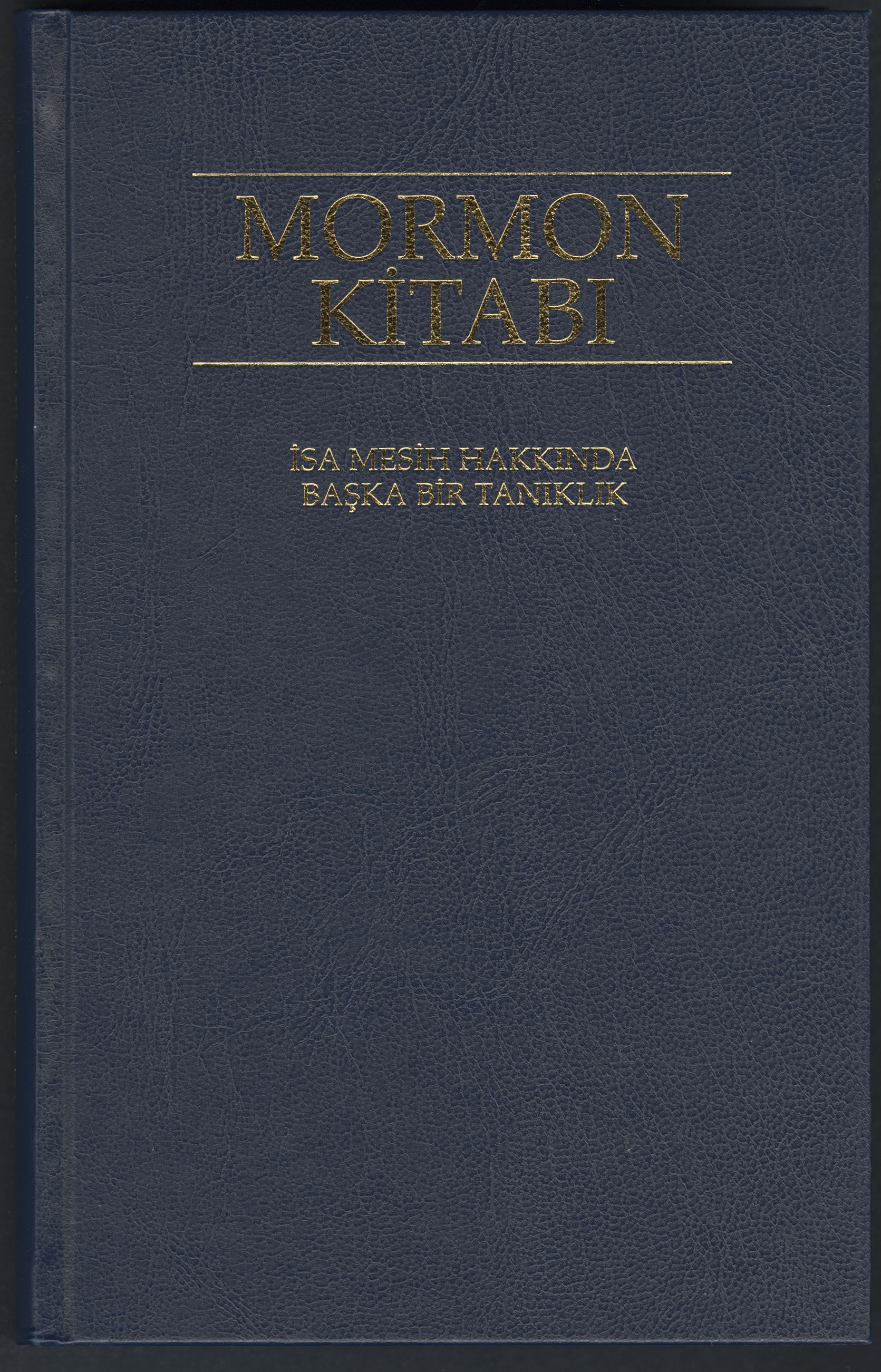
The Turkish translation of the Book of Mormon

Missionaries were sent to Antep in April 1889 with a branch being established soon after. A church school was established in Antep in the fall of 1898. The Book of Mormon was translated into Turkish in 1906. Due to hostilities, members were evacuated on September 16, 1921.

In the 1950s US military presence allowed serviceman's groups to meet throughout the country. The first congregation since the 1921 evacuation was organized in Ankara in October 1979. Some of the first native Turks to join the Church were baptized in the late 1980s in Germany. Turkey became part of the newly created Europe/Mediterranean Area in 1991. In 2000, Turkey became part of the Europe East Area.

The Church became legally recognized by the government in October 2011 and in February 2012 the church held its first church services and full-time missionaries from the Bulgaria Sofia Mission were assigned to Istanbul to begin proselyting. In 2014, there were 12 young missionaries (six in Ankara and six in Istanbul) and four missionary couples. Elder Dale G. Renlund visited Istanbul, Turkey in 2019.

=== Humanitarian Efforts ===
As of 2019, 633 humanitarian related projects were completed by the LDS Church, including 520 community projects, 74 wheelchair donation initiatives, 20 refugee response efforts, 12 emergency response initiatives, four maternal and newborn care projects, and three clean water initiatives. In 1991, 13,000 blankets, 80,000 pounds of clothing, and funds for medical supplies were sent by the church to Kurdish refugees in Turkey. The Church donated $50,000 to earthquake relief in 1999. In 2009, LDS Charities donated tables, chairs, and toys to a needy school in a village outside of Ankara and school supplies in other areas. The Church donated emergency supplies and hygiene kits to victims of a flash flood near Istanbul in 2009.

== District and Branches ==
On June 28, 2023, the Europe Central Area District was created comprising 7 branches in Turkey. In 2025 the district was reclassified and renamed Istanbul Türkiye District and administered by the newly created Europe Central Turkic and Persian-Speaking Mission. Congregations within the district include:

- Adana Branch
- Ankara Branch (English)
- Antalya Branch
- Baku Branch (Azerbaijan)
- Isparta Branch (Persian)
- Istanbul 1st Branch
- Istanbul 2nd Branch (English)
- Izmir Branch

Europe Central Turkic and Persian-Speaking Dispersed Members Unit is not part of a stake or district but serves families and individuals not in proximity to a meetinghouse, covering parts of Turkey as well as Kyrgyzstan, Tajikistan, Turkmenistan, and Uzbekistan.

In the February 2026 District Conference, the name of the district was changed from "Europe Central Turkic and Persian-speaking District" to "Istanbul Türkiye District".

== Missions ==
As of June 2023, Turkey is administered through the LDS Church's Europe Central Area and not by any mission.

On July 1, 2015, the Central Eurasian Mission was created from the Bulgaria Sofia and Russia Novosibirsk Missions with its mission office located in Istanbul, Turkey. In April 2018, Bulgaria was added to the mission and it was renamed the Bulgaria/Central Eurasian Mission. Its offices were moved to Sofia, Bulgaria. Boundaries for this mission included Azerbaijan, Bulgaria, Tajikistan, Turkey, Turkmenistan, and Uzbekistan. At the end of April 2018, all the missionaries were removed from Turkey and assigned elsewhere.

On July 1, 2025, the Europe Central Turkic and Persian-Speaking Mission was created. This mission includes the countries of Azerbaijan, Tajikistan, Turkey, Turkmenistan, and Uzbekistan.

== Temples ==
The closest temples to Turkey are the Rome Italy Temple and the Kyiv Ukraine Temple. Late Church President Russell M. Nelson has announced that temples will be built in Russia, Dubai and Hungary. Despite the closest temples being the ones above, the assigned temple for the current Istanbul Turkey District is the Bangkok Thailand Temple. The reason for this is that the Area Presidency does not think that the Kyiv Ukraine Temple is safe to take people to, and that the Turkish citizens need visas to go to the Rome Italy Temple.

== See also ==
- Christianity in Turkey
- Religion in Turkey
