= Alaverdi Gospels =

Beginning of the Gospel of Matthew from the Alaverdi Gospels

The Alaverdi Gospels (Alaverdi Four Gospels) is a Georgian gospel manuscript copied in the Georgian monastery of Black Mountain Kalipos in 1054 by the calligraphers Giorgi and John Dvali. It is the only Georgian manuscript to contain a mandylion, an impression of the face of the Savior on a shroud. The cover, composed of leather and metal, is adorned with a painted icon of Jesus Christ. This icon was subsequently set into a silver-chased frame embellished with precious stones and cloisonné enamel images of St. George, crafted in the 11th-12th century AD. Holy objects were traditionally stored in the sockets on the cover. The cover itself dates back to the late Middle Ages.

Ivane, the son of Liparit Bagvashi, brought the book to Georgia in 1059 as a sign of obedience to Bagrat IV.

High-quality parchment is used as writing material. contains 330 pages; The dimensions of the sheets are: 24X19 centimeters. It was written in both Nuskhuri and Asomatavruli scripts.
