= Basil Mkalavishvili =

Georgian former Orthodox priest

Basili Mkalavishvili (Georgian: ბასილ მკალავიშვილი) – also known as Vasili Mkalavishvili (Georgian: ვასილ მკალავიშვილი) – is an excommunicated Georgian Orthodox priest primarily known for having led a series of violent vigilante raids on people and buildings of other religious groups in Tbilisi and other towns in Georgia.

On October 17, 1999, Mkalavishvili led an attack on a meeting of 120 Jehovah's Witnesses at a meeting facility in the Tbilisi suburb of Gldani. Sixteen people required hospital treatment, including a mother of two who suffered permanent damage to one eye after being struck on the head. On March 24, 2001, a group of seven Assemblies of God pastors were meeting with three local missionaries to discuss the building of a Bible school to train local people for the pastorate, and were touring the property that had been set aside for that purpose, when they were attacked by approximately 100 individuals led by Mkalavishvili. He also had led attacks against Baptists, Roman Catholics, and other Eastern Orthodox people whom Mkalavishvili viewed as not holding to the faith as he interpreted it.

Mkalavishvili was released from prison in 2007 for health reasons, and kept a low profile, but in 2013 some Georgian Orthodox priests began rallying and sometimes physically attacking opponents over LGBT issues. The patriarch of the Georgia Orthodox Church called the attacks "impolite".
