= Religion in Georgia (country) =

Religion in Georgia (2024 census)
1. Georgian Orthodox Church (82.0%)
2. Armenian Apostolic Church (2.59%)
3. Other Christians (0.77%)
4. Islam (11.1%)
5. No religion (0.49%)
6. Other religions (0.30%)
7. Refused/Not specified (2.70%)

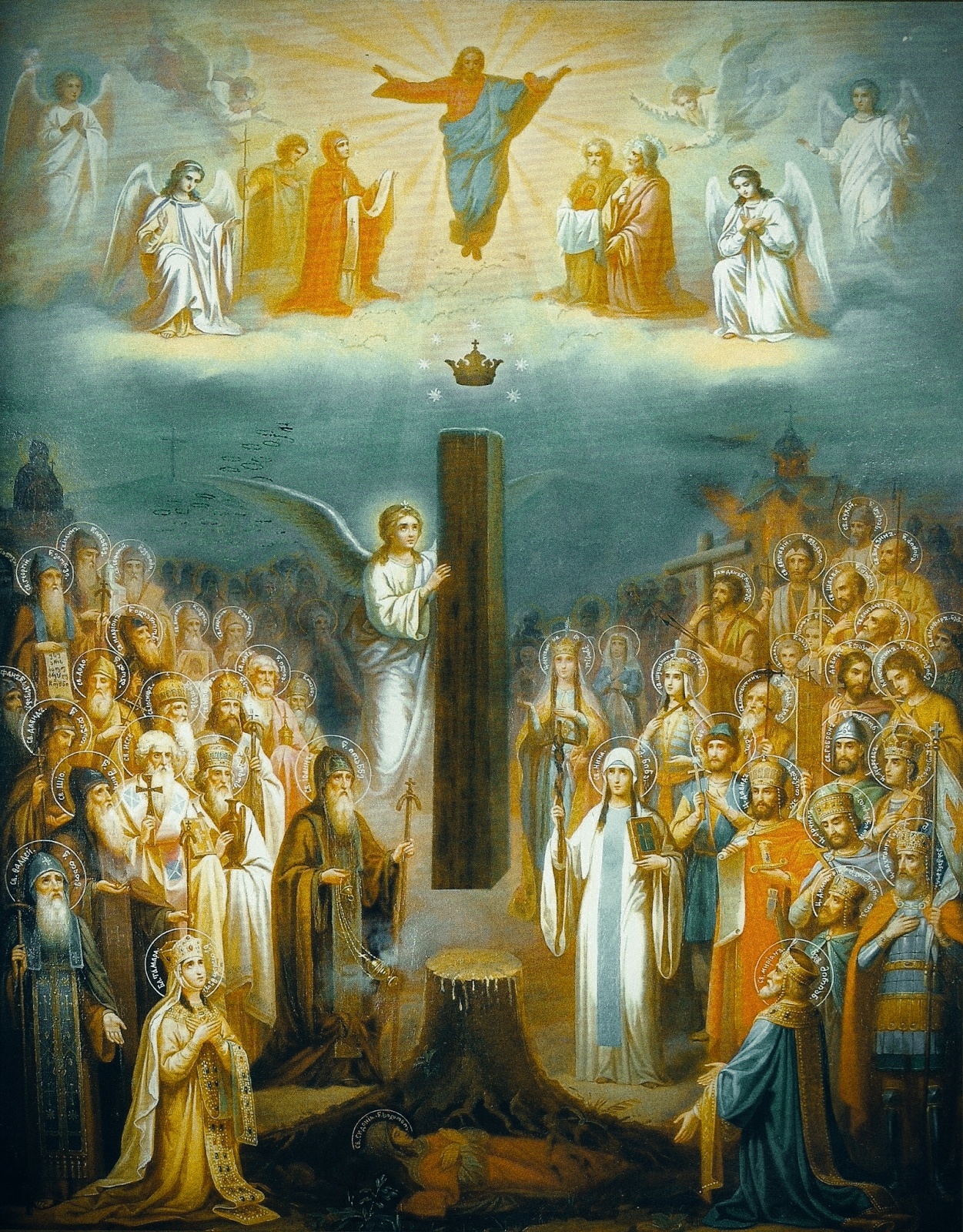
Eastern Orthodox Christianity is the main religion in Georgia. Here, the icon by Mikhail Sabinin depicts the history of the Georgian Orthodox Church, which, to this day, is recognized as the country's majority religion.

Christianity is the predominant religion in Georgia. The wide variety of peoples inhabiting Georgia has meant a correspondingly rich array of active religions in the country.

== Overview ==
The most recent census in 2024 showed that most of the population in Georgia practiced Eastern Orthodox Christianity, primarily in the Georgian Orthodox Church, whose adherents make up around 82% of the population. Around 2.6% of the population followed the Armenian Apostolic Church (Oriental Orthodoxy), almost all of which are ethnic Armenians. Adherents of Islam made up 11.1% of the population with are mainly found in the Adjara and Kvemo Kartli regions and as a sizeable minority in Tbilisi. Adherents of the Armenian Catholic Church and the Latin Church together made up approximately 0.5% of the population and were mostly located in southern Georgia, with a small number in Tbilisi. Protestants accounted for less than 1%. There was also a sizeable Jewish community in Tbilisi served by two synagogues.

The Georgian Apostolic Autocephalous Orthodox Church is one of the world's most ancient Christian churches, founded in the 1st century CE by the apostle Andrew. In the first half of the 4th century, Christianity was adopted as the state religion. This has provided a strong sense of national identity that has helped to preserve a national Georgian identity, despite repeated periods of foreign occupation and attempted cultural assimilation.

Georgia has a long history of religious harmony within its borders despite the historical conflicts with the surrounding nations. Different religious minorities have lived in Georgia for thousands of years, and religious discrimination is virtually unknown in the country. Jewish communities exist throughout the country, with major concentrations in the two largest cities, Tbilisi and Kutaisi. Azerbaijani groups have practiced Islam in Georgia for centuries, as have Adjarians and some of the Abkhazians concentrated in their respective autonomous republics.

== Religious demography ==
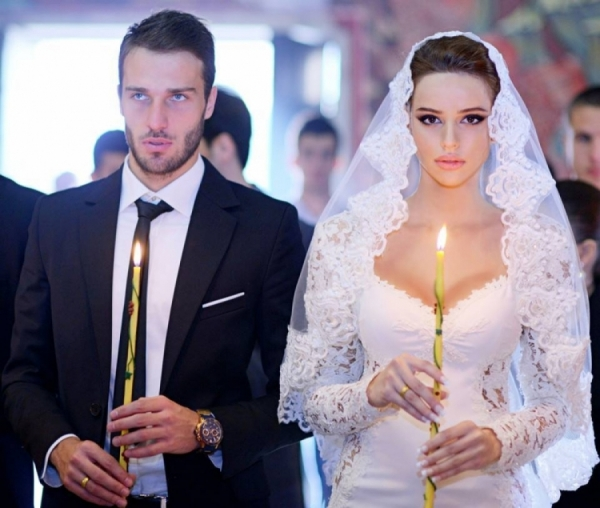
Georgian Orthodox Christian Wedding Ceremony.

The country has a total area of approximately 67,000 square kilometres (25,900 sq mi), and a population (as of 2024) of 3.9 million people.

In addition, there are a small number of mostly ethnic Russian believers from two dissenter Christian movements: the ultra-orthodox Old Believers, and the Spiritual Christians (i.e., the Molokans and the Doukhobors). The majority of these groups have left the country since the mid-1980s.

Under Soviet rule (1921–1990), the number of active churches and priests declined sharply, and religious education became nearly nonexistent. Membership in the Georgian Orthodox Church has increased markedly since independence in 1991. The church maintains 4 theological seminaries, 2 academies, several schools, and 27 church dioceses; it has 700 priests, 250 monks, and 150 nuns. The Catholicos-Patriarch of All Georgia, Ilia II, with his seat in Tbilisi, heads the church.

Several religions, including the Armenian Apostolic Church, the Catholic Church, Judaism, and Islam, have traditionally coexisted alongside Georgian Orthodoxy. A large number of Armenians live in the southern Javakheti region, in which they constitute a majority of the population. Islam is prevalent among Azerbaijani and the North Caucasian ethnic communities in the eastern part of the country, and is also found in the regions of Adjara and Abkhazia.

Judaism, which has been present since ancient times, is practiced in a number of communities throughout the country, especially in the largest cities, Tbilisi and Kutaisi. Approximately 3,200 Jews remained in the country as of 17 December 2017, according to a report in Vice, following two large waves of emigration: the first in the early 1970s and the second in the period of perestroika during the late 1980s. Before then, Jewish officials estimate, Georgia had as many as 100,000 Jews. There are also small numbers of Lutheran worshippers, mostly among descendants of German communities that first settled in the country from 1817. A small number of the ethno-religious group of the Yezidis have lived in the country for centuries.

== Christianity ==
The Georgian flag is formed by the Jerusalem Cross, symbol of Christianity.

Jvari Monastery, near Mtskheta, one of Georgia's oldest surviving monasteries (6th century).

According to Orthodox tradition, Christianity was first preached in Georgia by the Apostles Simon and Andrew in the 1st century. It became the state religion of Kartli (Iberia) in 326. The conversion of Kartli to Christianity is credited to St. Nino of Cappadocia. The Georgian Orthodox Church, originally part of the Church of Antioch, gained its autocephaly and developed its doctrinal specificity progressively between the 5th and 10th centuries. The Bible was also translated into Georgian in the 5th century, as the Georgian alphabet was developed for that purpose. As was true elsewhere, the Christian church in Georgia was crucial to the development of a written language, and most of the earliest written works were religious texts. From the first centuries A.D., the cult of Mithras, pagan beliefs, and Zoroastrianism were commonly practiced in Georgia.

Christianity gradually replaced all the former religions except Zoroastrianism, which became somewhat of a second established religion in Iberia after the Peace of Acilisene in 378, which placed Georgians permanently on the front line of conflict between the Islamic and Christian worlds. Georgians remained mostly Christian despite repeated invasions by Muslim powers, and long episodes of foreign domination. After Georgia was annexed by the Russian Empire, the Russian Orthodox Church took over the Georgian church in 1811.

The Georgian church regained its autocephaly only when Russian rule ended in 1917. The Soviet regime that ruled Georgia from 1921 did not consider revitalization of the Georgian church an important goal, however. Soviet rule brought severe purges of the Georgian church hierarchy and frequent repression of Orthodox worship. As elsewhere in the Soviet Union, many churches were destroyed or converted into secular buildings. This history of repression encouraged the incorporation of religious identity into the strong nationalist movement and the quest of Georgians for religious expression outside the official, government-controlled church. In the late 1960s and early 1970s, opposition leaders, especially Zviad Gamsakhurdia, criticized corruption in the church hierarchy. After Ilia II became the patriarch (catholicos) of the Georgian Orthodox Church in the late 1970s, Georgian Orthodoxy experienced a revival. In 1988 Moscow permitted the patriarch to begin consecrating and reopening closed churches, and a large-scale restoration process began. The Georgian Orthodox Church has regained much power and full independence from the state since the restoration of Georgia's independence in 1991. It is not a state religion, but its special status is recognized by the Concordat of 2002.

Holy Trinity Cathedral of Tbilisi, the third-tallest Eastern Orthodox cathedral in the world

Apart from the Georgian Orthodox Church, Christianity in Georgia is represented by followers of the Armenian Apostolic Church and the Russian Orthodox Church. There are also adherents to the Catholic Church in Georgia, with members of both the Latin Church and Armenian Catholic Church.

A 2015 study estimates some 1,300 Christian believers from a Muslim background in the country, most of them belonging to some form of Protestantism.

== Religious minorities ==
=== Islam ===
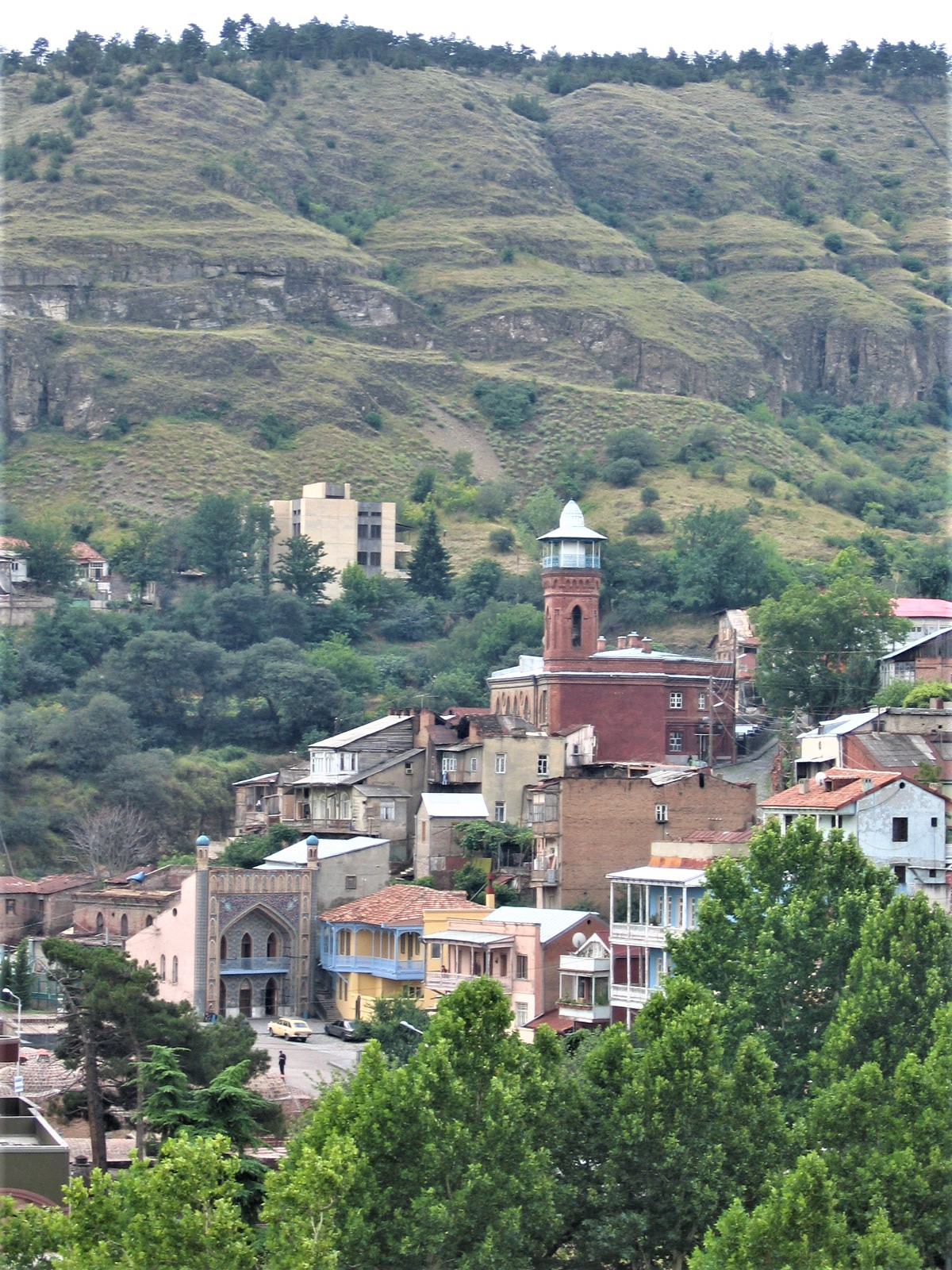
Mosque in Tbilisi

Islam in Georgia was introduced in 645 AD during the reign of third Caliph of Islam, Uthman. During this period, Tbilisi (al-Tefelis) grew into a center of trade between the Islamic world and northern Europe. Islam's history continued in Georgia throughout the late 14th and early 15th centuries with Timur's invasions of Georgia and during the 16th and early 19th centuries, the Iranians (Safavids, Afsharids, Qajars) and Ottomans commanded influence in the region until its annexation by Russia in 1801. In 1703, Vakhtang VI became the ruler of the kingdom of Kartli and he embraced Islam. Other notable Georgian Muslims from that era include David XI of Kartli, Jesse of Kakheti and Simon II of Kartli.

Muslims constitute 11.1%, or 437,458 of the Georgian population according to the 2024 census. The ethnic Georgian Muslims are predominantly Sunni and living in Adjara near the border with Turkey. The ethnic Azerbaijani Muslims are mostly Shia, and live near the border between Azerbaijan and Armenia. The Parliament of Georgia passed a law in July 2011 to allow religious minority groups with "historic ties to Georgia" to register with the government, with a focus on Islam and four other religions. The draft of the law specifically mentions Islam and four other religious communities.

=== Judaism ===
The Jews have a history in Georgia extending back over 2000 years. Today there is a small Jewish community in the country (3,541 according to the 2002 census and 1,013 according to the 2024 one), although the Jewish population was over 100,000 as recently as the 1970s. Especially following the collapse of the Soviet Union, almost all of the country's Jews have left, mainly to Israel. The majority of Georgia's remaining Jews today live in Tbilisi and are served by its two synagogues. Because the size of the community is now so small, and for economic reasons, the two congregations are now housed on two storeys of one of the formerly separate synagogues.

=== Baháʼí Faith ===
The history of the Baháʼí Faith in Georgia begins with its arrival in the region in 1850 through its association with the precursor religion the Bábí Faith during the lifetime of Bahá'u'lláh. During the period of Soviet policy of religious oppression, the Baháʼís in the Soviet Republics lost contact with the Baháʼís elsewhere. However, in 1963 an individual was identified in Tbilisi. Following Perestroika the first Baháʼí Local Spiritual Assembly in Georgia formed in 1991 and Georgian Baháʼís elected their first National Spiritual Assembly in 1995. The religion is noted as growing in Georgia.

=== International Society for Krishna Consciousness ===
The followers of the International Society for Krishna Consciousness (ISKCON) first appeared in Sukhumi in the early 1980s, where the first local group was formed. The initiator and organizer of the movement was Otar Nachkebia, who, after initiation, received the spiritual name Ambarisha Dasa. He established a Krishna temple in his own residence and began to propagate the teachings of the movement. Shortly thereafter, criminal proceedings were instituted against him and his associates, which resulted in their conviction and imprisonment. Following these events, the center of the movement shifted to Tbilisi, although Krishna devotees continued to reside in the same house in Sukhumi.

The Tbilisi branch, known as the Vedic Culture Center, was founded in 1986 and officially registered in 1992. The organization includes an Ashram (residential quarters for devotees) and a temple that serves as the principal site of worship.The Tbilisi ashram was established and constructed with the assistance of the Krishna community of Heidelberg, Germany, and is officially registered under the name Vedic Culture Center.

The organization reached its peak membership in the early 1990s, numbering approximately 500 adherents. During this period, in addition to religious, publishing, and literary activities, the movement carried out extensive charitable work, including the establishment of free dining facilities and the distribution of food to the front lines during the War in Abkhazia. As of the present, the number of ISKCON devotees who are citizens of Georgia does not exceed 200.

== Religious freedom ==
The Georgian Constitution provides for freedom of religion, and the Government generally respects this right in practice. Citizens generally do not interfere with traditional religious groups; however, there have been reports of violence and discrimination against nontraditional religious groups.

In 2023, the country was scored 2 out of 4 for religious freedom. It was noted that religious minorities have reported discrimination and that members of the clergy have been surveilled by the SSS.

During the 2024 Georgian parliamentary election the Georgian Dream announced the prospect of a constitutional amendment designating Orthodox Christianity as the state religion. The ruling party branded this initiative as part of their commitment to uphold "national values and traditions," in line with their campaign promises to ban "LGBT propaganda" and reinforce the role of the Church.

In contrast, the Georgian Orthodox Church has expressed skepticism, fearing that such a change could compromise its independence and increase government control. High-ranking clergy members, including Metropolitan Shio Mujiri and Metropolitan Nikoloz Pachuashvili, have raised concerns about the potential implications of this proposal, arguing that it could alter the traditionally independent yet cooperative relationship between the state and the Church established by the 2002 Concordat.

== See also ==
- Secularism and Irreligion in Georgia
- Religion in Abkhazia
- Religion in South Ossetia
