= Concordat of 2002 =

2002 agreement between the Georgian Orthodox Church and the government of Georgia

The Constitutional Agreement between the Georgian state and the Apostolic Autocephalous Orthodox Church of Georgia (Georgian: კონსტიტუციური შეთანხმება საქართველოს სახელმწიფოსა და საქართველოს სამოციქულო ავტოკეფალურ მართლმადიდებელ ეკლესიას შორის), informally referred to as the Concordat, is an agreement between the Georgian Orthodox Church (GOC) and the state that defines relations between the two entities. It was signed by President of Georgia Eduard Shevardnadze and Patriarch of Georgia Ilia II on 14 October 2002 at Svetitskhoveli Cathedral in Mtskheta, Georgia.

- The concordat confirms the Georgian Orthodox Church's ownership of all churches and monasteries on the territory of Georgia, including those in ruins or non-operating.
- The agreement recognizes the special role of the GOC in the history of Georgia and devolves authority over all religious matters to it.
- The concordat also gives the patriarch legal immunity, grants the GOC the exclusive right to staff the military chaplaincy, exempts GOC clergymen from military service, and gives the GOC a unique consultative role in government, especially in the sphere of education.
- The government of Georgia recognizes the legitimacy of the wedding ceremonies performed by the Georgian Orthodox Church, while maintaining that in legal matters government records must be used.
- As a partial owner of what had been confiscated from the church under Soviet rule (1921–1991), the State pledges to recompense, at least partially, for the damage.

Some of the concordat's provisions, including the consultative role of the church in education, require implementing legislation yet to be adopted by parliament.

Under the concordat, the Georgian Orthodox Church was the only officially recognized religious denomination in Georgia. Although other minorities such as Catholics and Muslims had freedom to exercise their religion, they could officially register their religious groups only as unions or foundations, and not as churches. Under the concordat, smaller branches of Eastern Orthodoxy in Georgia such as the Russian Orthodox Church were also subject to the jurisdiction of the GOC on all territory within the Georgian state. However, since July 2011 religious organizations in Georgia can be registered as legal entities under public law.
